= Mannheim =

City in Baden-Württemberg, Germany

Mannheim Mannem / Monnem (Palatine German)
- City
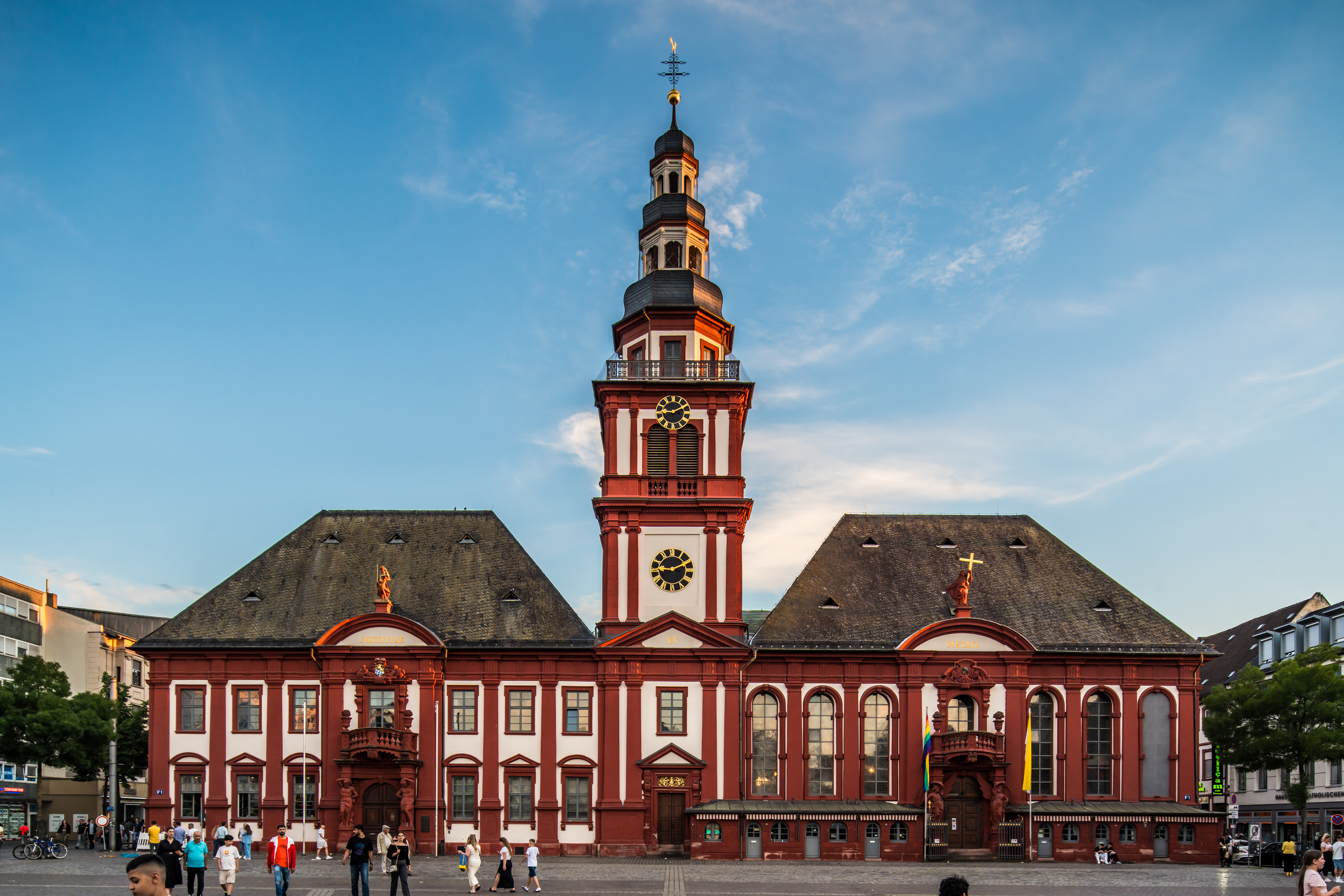
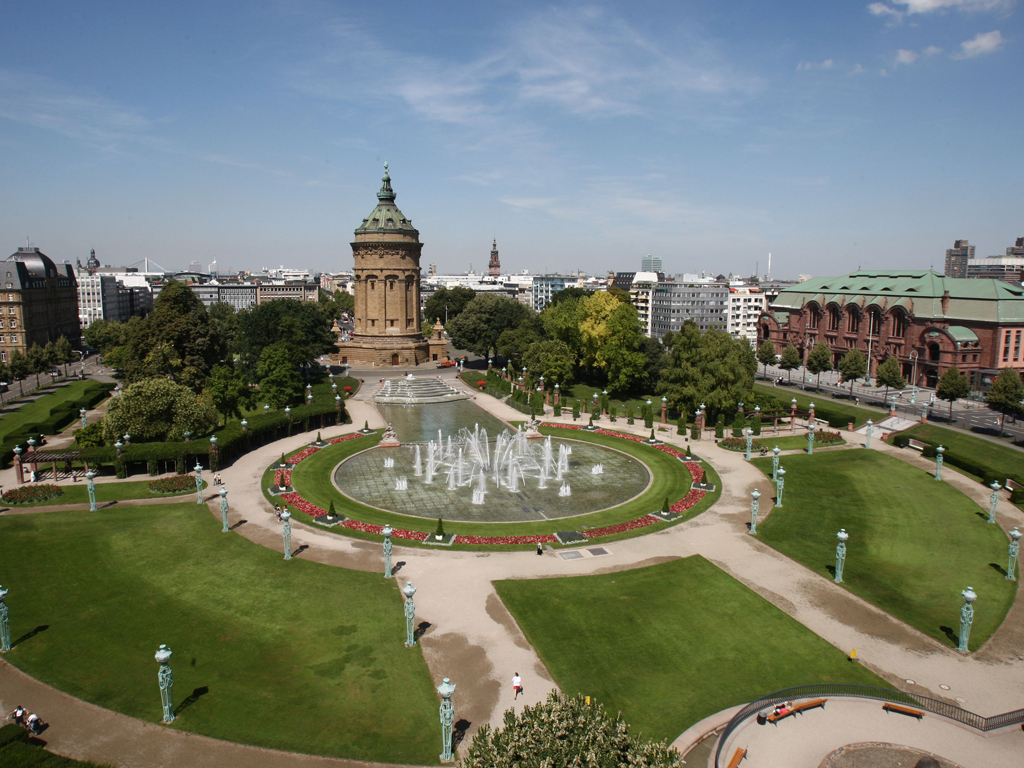
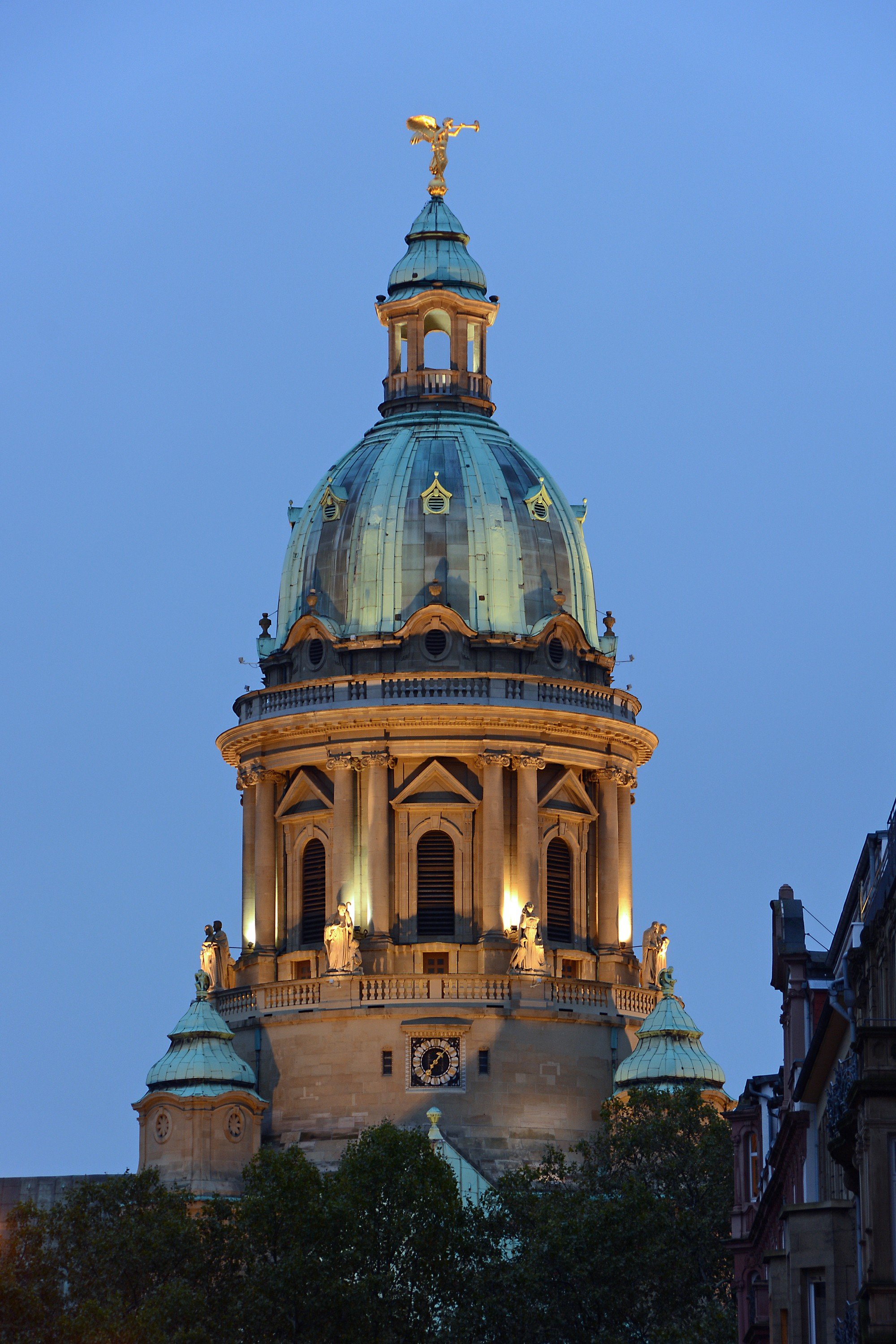
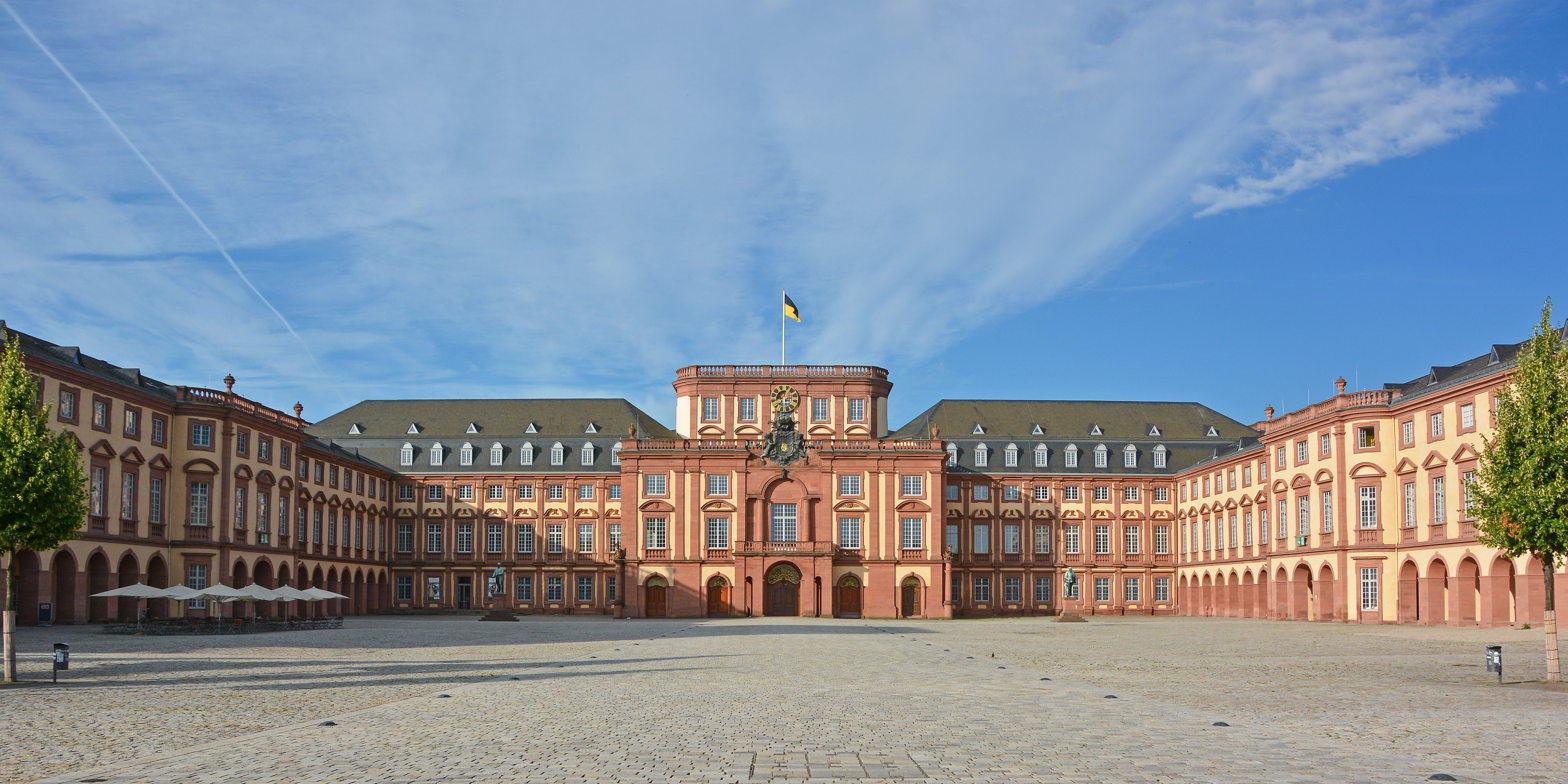
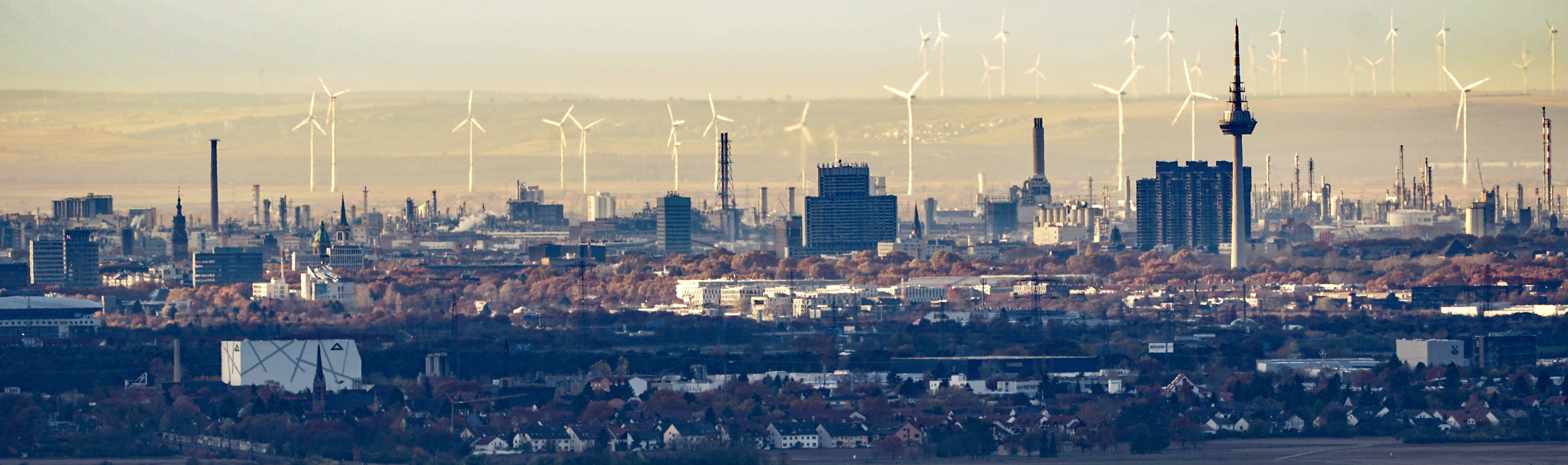
- Old City Hall and St. Sebastian Friedrichsplatz Christ Church Mannheim Palace View of Mannheim from Heidelberg with wind turbines in the Palatine Forest in the background

- Flag Coat of arms

- Location of Mannheim in Baden-Württemberg
- Interactive map of Mannheim
- Location within Germany Location within Baden-Württemberg
- Coordinates: 49°29′16″N 08°27′58″E
- Country: Germany
- State: Baden-Württemberg
- Admin. region: Karlsruhe
- District: Urban district
- Founded: 1607
- Subdivisions: 17 Stadtbezirke

Government
  - Mayor (2023–31): Christian Specht (CDU)

Area
  - City: 144.96 km^{2} (55.97 sq mi)
- Elevation: 97 m (318 ft)

Population (2025-12-31)
  - City: 319,536
  - Density: 2,204.3/km^{2} (5,709.1/sq mi)
  - Metro: 2,362,046 (2,012)
- Demonym: Mannheimer
- Time zone: UTC+01:00 (CET)
  - Summer (DST): UTC+02:00 (CEST)
- Postal codes: 68001–68309
- Dialling codes: 0621
- Vehicle registration: MA
- Website: www.mannheim.de

Mannheim (German: [ˈmanhaɪm]; Palatine German: Mannem or Monnem), officially the University City of Mannheim (German: Universitätsstadt Mannheim), is the second-largest city in Baden-Württemberg after Stuttgart, the state capital, and Germany's 21st-largest city, with a population of over 315,000. It is located at the border with Rhineland-Palatinate. The city is the cultural and economic centre of the Rhine-Neckar, Germany's seventh-largest metropolitan region, with nearly 2.4 million inhabitants.

Mannheim is located at the confluence of the Upper Rhine and the Neckar in the Kurpfalz (Electoral Palatinate) region of northwestern Baden-Württemberg. The city lies in the Upper Rhine Plain, Germany's warmest region, between the Palatine Forest and the Oden Forest. Mannheim forms a continuous urban zone of around 500,000 inhabitants with Ludwigshafen am Rhein in the Rhineland-Palatinate, while some northern suburbs lie in Hesse; Hamburg is the only other German city with a presence in two states other than its own.

Unusually for a German city, central Mannheim's streets and avenues are laid out in a grid pattern, leading to its nickname as the Quadratestadt (Square City) and the tourism slogan "Leben im Quadrat" ("Life in the Square"). Also, most of the streets in central Mannheim do not have street names; the city blocks are instead referred to by letter and number. At the southern base of this system is Mannheim Palace. It was the former home of the Prince-elector of the Electoral Palatinate, and now houses the University of Mannheim. The civic symbol of the city is the Mannheim Water Tower, completed in 1886 and rising to 60 metres (200 feet) above the art nouveau area Friedrichsplatz. Held annually, Mannheim's May Market is the largest regional consumer exhibition of Germany.

Mannheim is well-known for its inventions, including the automobile, the bicycle, and the tractor, leading to a nickname of the "city of inventions". The city is the starting and finishing point of the Bertha Benz Memorial Route, which follows the tracks of the first long-distance automobile trip in history.

A Großstadt (major city with more than 100,000 inhabitants) since 1896, Mannheim is an important industrial and commercial city, a university town, and a major transportation hub between Frankfurt and Stuttgart, including an ICE interchange (the Mannheim Hauptbahnhof), Germany's second-largest marshalling yard (the Mannheim Rangierbahnhof), and Germany's largest inland port (the Mannheim Harbour). The city is home to factories, offices and headquarters of major corporations such as Roche, ABB, IBM, Siemens and Unilever. Mannheim's SAP Arena is home to German ice hockey record champions Adler Mannheim as well as the popular handball team Rhein-Neckar Löwen. Since 2014, Mannheim has been a member of UNESCO's Creative Cities Network and holds the title of "UNESCO City of Music". In 2020, Mannheim was classified as a global city with 'Sufficiency' status by the Globalization and World Cities Research Network (GaWC). Mannheim is a smart city; the city's electrical grid is installed with a power-line communication network.

== History ==
=== Early history ===
A brick kiln excavated in 1929 in the Seckenheim district, which operated from 74 AD to the early second century, attests to settlement in Roman times.

The name of the city was first recorded as Mannenheim in a legal transaction in 766, surviving in a twelfth-century copy in the Codex Laureshamensis from Lorsch Abbey. The name is interpreted as "the home of Manno", a short form of a Germanic name such as Hartmann or Hermann. Mannheim remained a village throughout the Middle Ages.

=== Early Modern Age ===
In 1606, Frederick IV, Elector Palatine started building the fortress of Friedrichsburg and the adjacent city centre with its grid of streets and avenues. On 24 January 1607, Frederick IV gave Mannheim the official status of a "city".

Mannheim was mostly levelled during the Thirty Years' War around 1622 by the forces of Johan Tilly. After being rebuilt, it was again severely damaged by the French Army in 1689 during the Nine Years' War (also called "The War of Palatinate Succession" as Philippe I, Duke of Orléans, a younger brother of Louis XIV made a competing claim to the electorate of the Palatinate).

After the rebuilding of Mannheim from 1698 onwards, the capital of the Electorate of the Palatinate was moved from Heidelberg to Mannheim in 1720 when Karl III Philip, Elector Palatine began construction of Mannheim Palace and the Jesuit Church; they were completed in 1760.

=== 18th and 19th centuries ===
In 1819, Norwich Duff wrote of Mannheim:

Mannheim is in the Duchy of Baden and situated at the confluence of the Rhine and Neckar over both of which there is a bridge of boats. This is the third town of this name having been twice burnt. The houses are large, and the streets are broad and at right angles to each other, and is one of the most airy clean towns I have seen in Germany. It was formerly fortified, but the fortifications were razed in 1806 and gardens fill their places. There is a large château here belonging to the Grand Duke and a very good garden; part of the château was destroyed when the town was bombarded and has never since been repaired, the other part is occupied by the Grand Duchess, widow of the late Grand Duke who was succeeded by his uncle having left only three daughters. She is the sister of Eugene Beauharnais [sic; in fact, she was his second cousin]. There is a cathedral, a theatre which is considered good, an observatory, a gallery of pictures at the château, and some private collections. About two kilometres (one point two miles) below the town the Russian Army crossed the Rhine in 1813. Population 18,300.

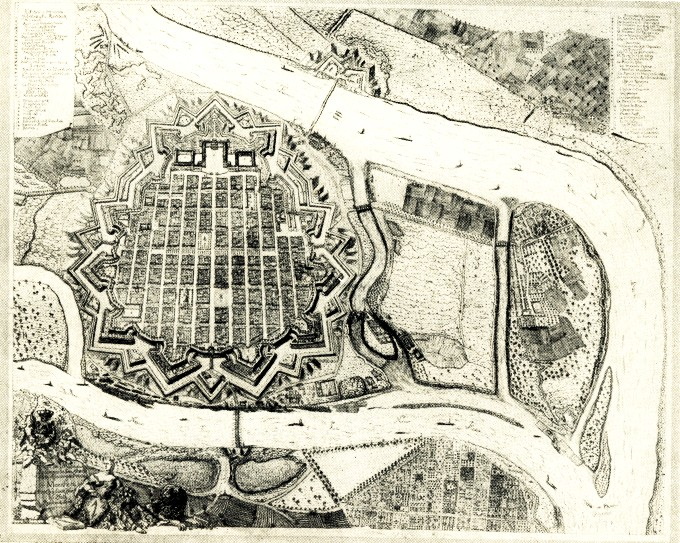
Mannheim in 1758

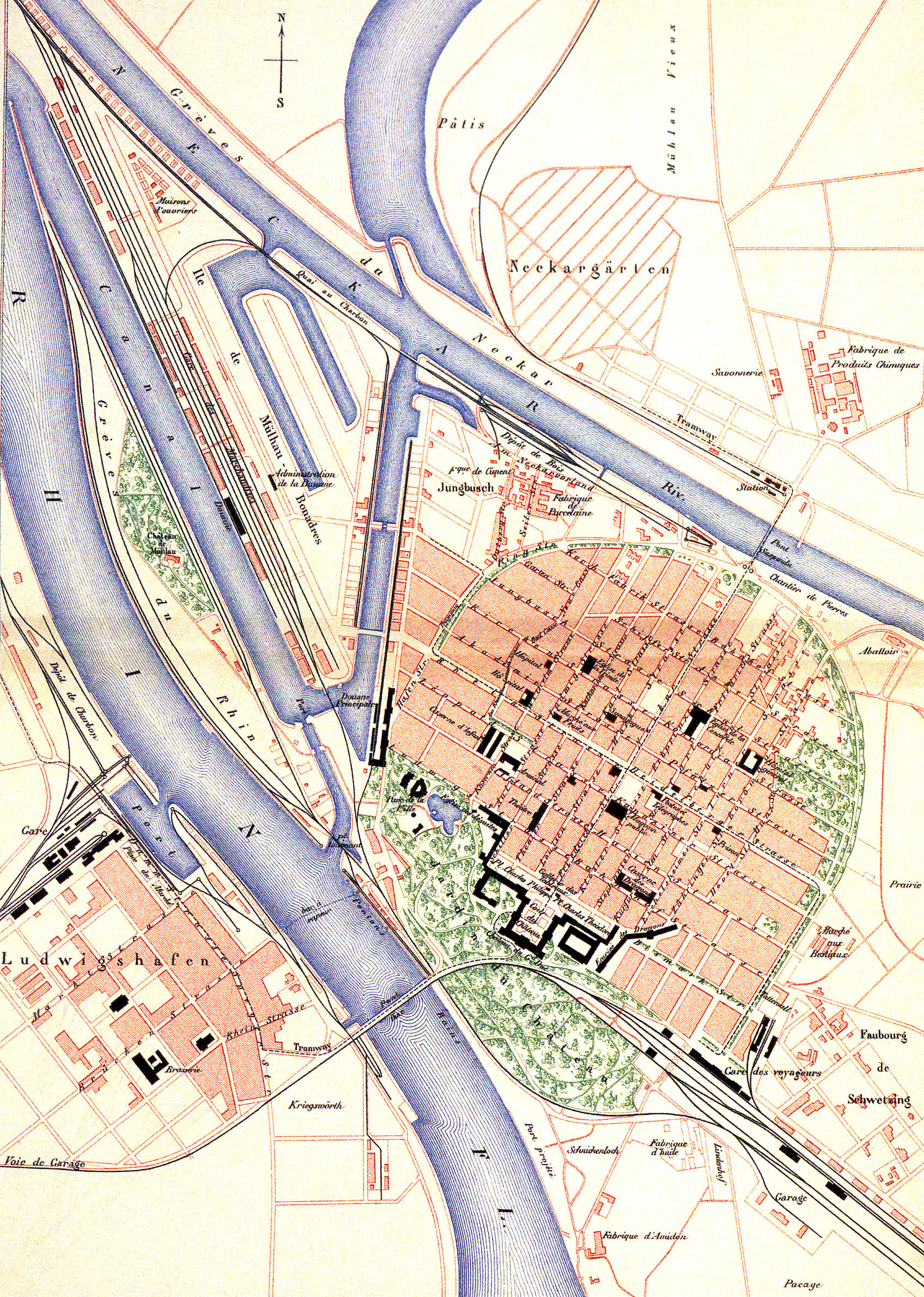
Historical map of Mannheim in 1880

During the eighteenth century, Mannheim was the home of the "Mannheim School" of classical music composers. Mannheim was said to have one of the best court orchestras in Europe under the leadership of the conductor Carlo Grua. The royal court of the Palatinate left Mannheim in 1778, as Charles Theodore had become Elector of Bavaria and moved to Munich. Two decades later, in 1802, Mannheim was removed from the Palatinate and given to the Grand Duchy of Baden.

The climate crisis of 1816–17 caused famine and the death of many horses in Mannheim. That same year Karl Drais invented the first bicycle.

In 1819, August von Kotzebue was assassinated in Mannheim.

Infrastructure improvements included the establishment of Rhine Harbour in 1828 and the construction of the first Baden railway, which opened from Mannheim to Heidelberg in 1840. Influenced by the economic rise of the middle class, another golden age of Mannheim gradually began. In the March Revolution of 1848, the city was a centre for political and revolutionary activity.

In 1865, Friedrich Engelhorn founded the Badische Anilin- und Soda-Fabrik (Baden Aniline and Soda Factory, BASF) in Mannheim, but the factory was constructed across the Rhine in Ludwigshafen because Mannheim residents feared air pollution from its operations. From this dye factory, BASF has developed into the largest chemical company in the world. After opening a workshop in Mannheim in 1871 and patenting engines from 1878, Karl Benz patented the first motor car in 1886. He was born in Mühlburg (now part of Karlsruhe).

=== Early 20th century and World War I ===
The Schütte-Lanz company, founded by Karl Lanz and Johann Schütte in 1909, built 22 airships. The company's main competitor was the Zeppelin works.

When World War I broke out in 1914, Mannheim's industrial plants played a key role in Germany's war economy. This contributed to the fact that, on 27 May 1915, Ludwigshafen was the world's first civilian settlement behind the battle lines to be bombed from the air. French aircraft attacked the BASF plants, thereby killing twelve people. The precedent was set for this attack by Germany's repeated air raids against British civilian populations throughout southeastern Britain during the first half of 1915.

When Germany lost the war in 1918, according to the peace terms, the left bank of the Rhine was occupied by French troops. The French occupation lasted until 1930, and some of Ludwigshafen's most elegant houses were erected for the officers of the French garrison.

=== Inter-war period ===
After the First World War, the Heinrich Lanz Company built the Bulldog, an advanced tractor, powered by heavy oil. As a result of the invention of the pre-combustion chamber by Prosper L'Orange, Benz & Cie. developed the world's first compact diesel-powered car at its motor works in Mannheim in 1923. In 1922, the Grosskraftwerk Mannheim (Mannheim large power station) was opened. By 1930, the city, along with its sister city of Ludwigshafen, which had developed out of the old Mannheim Rheinschanze, had a population of 385,000.

=== World War II ===
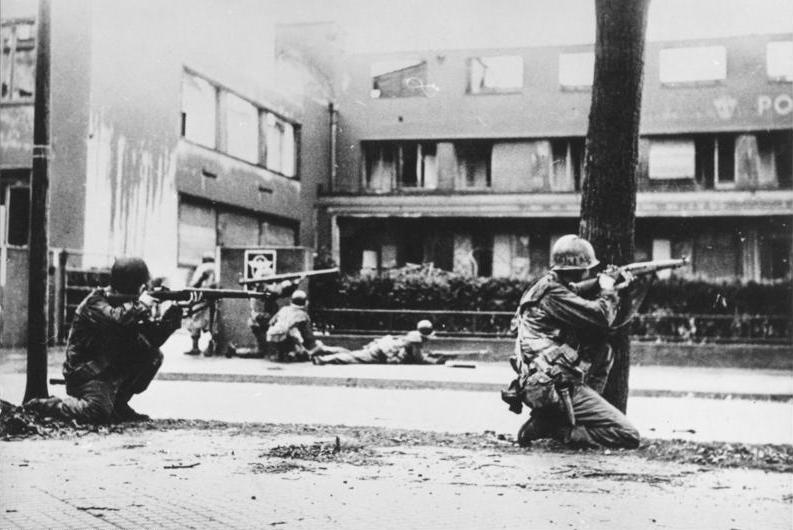
US troops in street fighting in Mannheim, 1945

During World War II, air raids on Mannheim completely destroyed the city centre. Mannheim was heavily damaged during aerial bombing by the Royal Air Force (RAF) and the United States Army Air Forces (USAAF). Allied bombing raids razed the city centre of Mannheim at night-time area bombing, killing thousands of civilians. In the meantime, 2,262 of Mannheim's Jews were sent to Nazi concentration camps. Some sources state that the first deliberate strategic bombing of the war occurred at Mannheim during a Royal Air Force night raid on 16 December 1940. Today around one third of the city consists of buildings from before 1950.

In late March 1945, the Allied ground advance into Germany reached Mannheim, which was potentially well-defended by German forces. However, the German forces abandoned the city and the U.S. 44th Infantry Division entered unopposed on 29 March 1945. There was later a large American military occupation presence in the Mannheim area with up to 10 barracks. The first one was closed in 2007 and the last in 2013 (see United States military installations below).

=== 1950s to 1980s ===
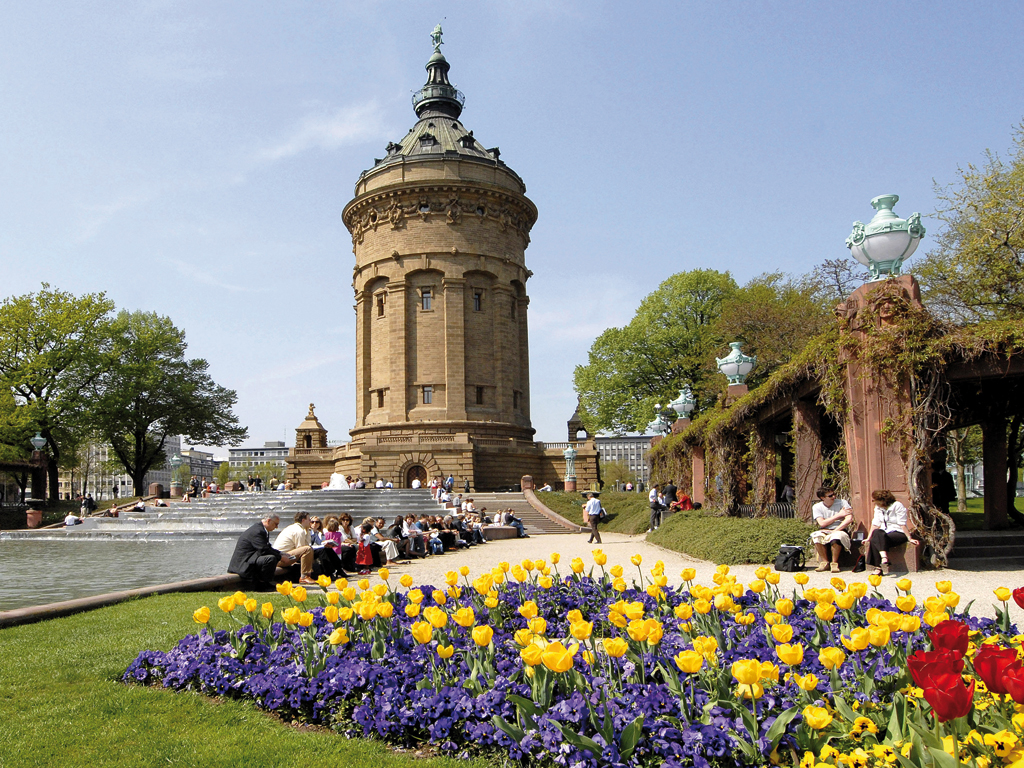
The Wasserturm Garden

After the war, large portions of the city required rebuilding. The Mannheim Palace and the water tower (Wasserturm) were reconstructed, whilst the National Theatre was replaced in a new location. At the old location, there is now a park with a monument to Friedrich Schiller. The housing shortage led to the development of many new residential areas.

In 1964, the City Hospital (Städtisches Krankenhaus) became part of the Heidelberg University for Clinical Medicine in Mannheim. In 1967, the University of Mannheim was established in the city.

In 1975, the Bundesgartenschau (Federal horticulture show) was celebrated in the Luisen and Herzogenried parks. A number of pieces of infrastructure were developed for the show: the telecommunications tower and a second bridge across the Rhine (the Kurt Schumacher Bridge) were built, the pedestrian zone in the city centre was established, the new Rosengarten conference centre was opened and the Aerobus was installed as a temporary transport system.

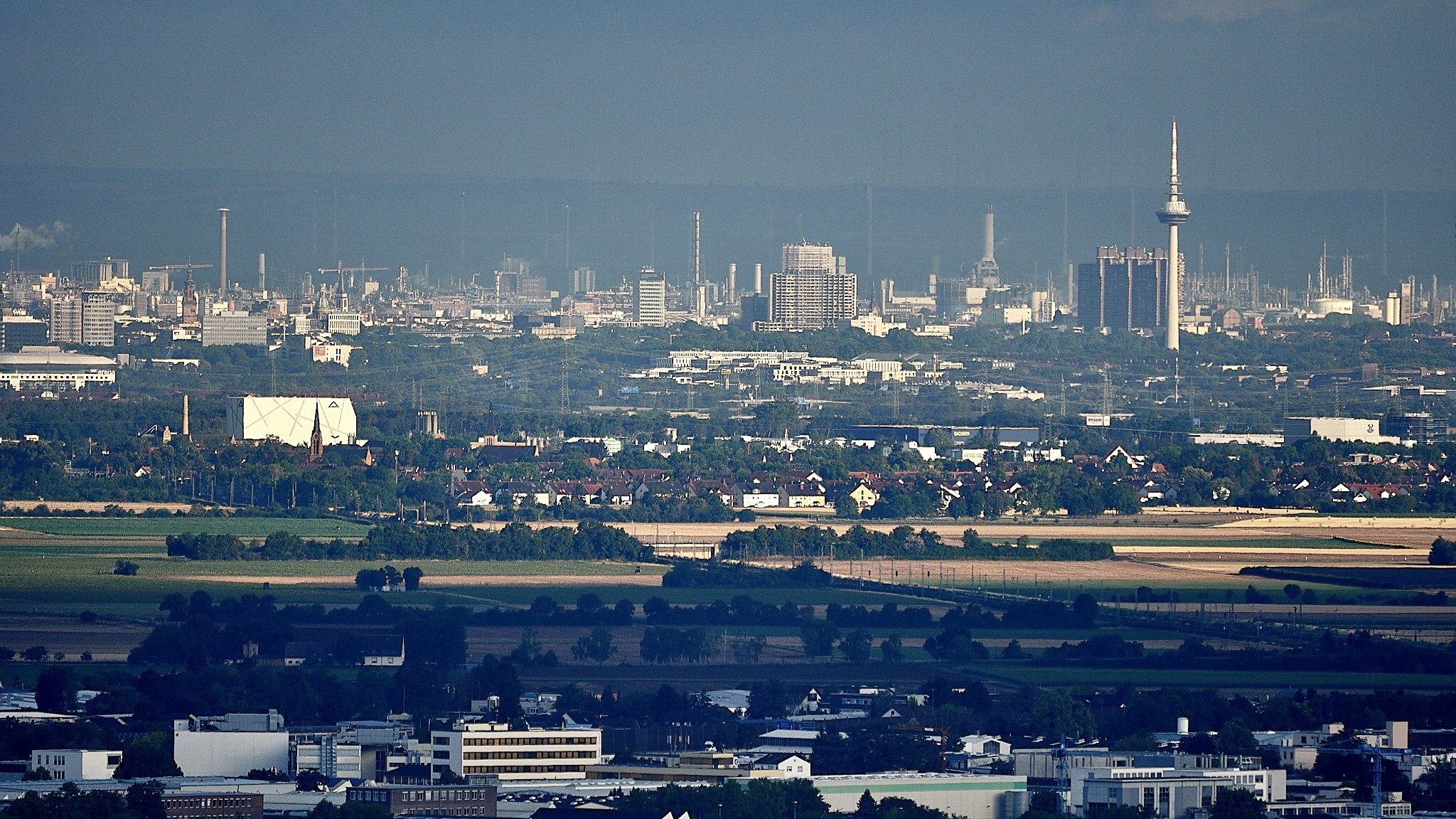
Mannheim skyline viewed from Heidelberg

A number of major projects were completed in the 1980s and 1990s: a planetarium, an extension to the art gallery, the Reiß Museum, the Stadthaus, new May Market grounds, a synagogue, a mosque, the State Museum for Technology and Work, the Carl-Benz stadium and the Fahrlach tunnel were opened.

Mannheim has lost many industrial jobs where previously the city was economically dominated by manufacturing. The city previously tried to prevent the establishment of service providers by designating some locations as industrial areas. A prime example of the current trend is the construction of the Victoria Tower (Victoria-Turm) in 2001, one of the tallest buildings in the city, on railway land.

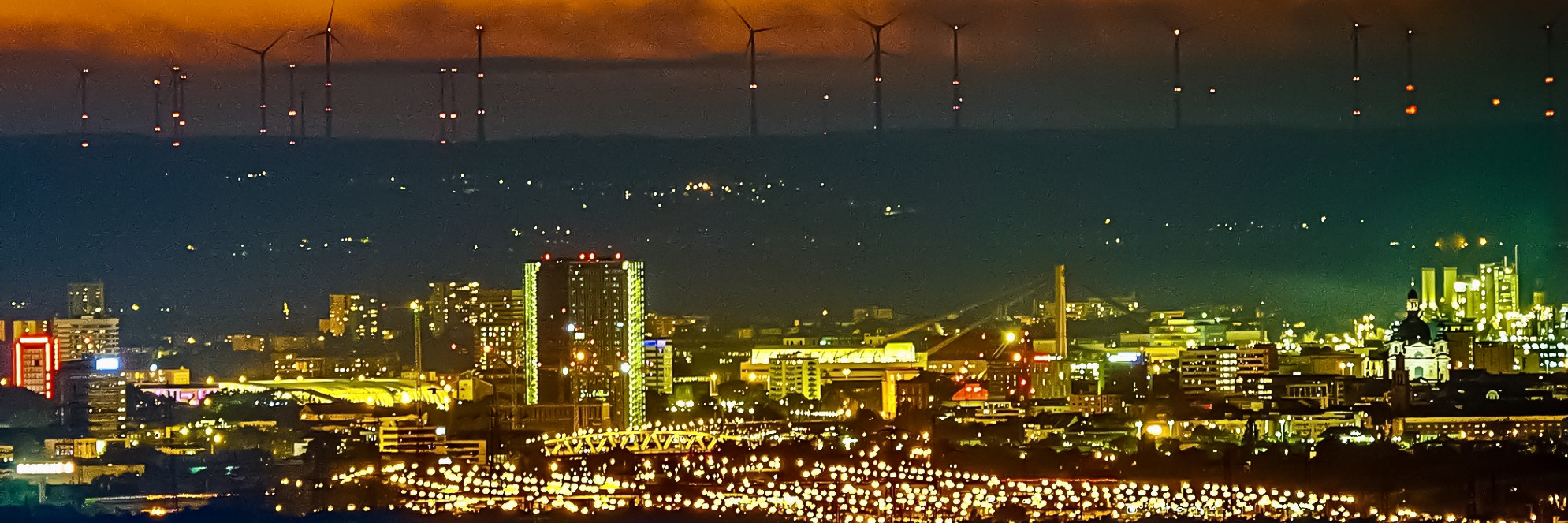
Victoria Turm Mannheim at the marshalling yard at night

=== Post-reunification ===
In 2001, the city hospital was officially and legally renamed to the University Hospital Mannheim.

The 400th anniversary of the city was in 2006, since Frederick IV, Elector Palatine laid the foundations of Mannheim citadel on 17 March 1606. Mannheim instead celebrated its 400th anniversary with a series of cultural and other events throughout 2007. In preparation for the anniversary, some urban activities were implemented, beginning in 2000: the building of the SAP Arena with access to the city's new eastern ring road, the rehabilitation of the pedestrian zone in Breite Straße, the arsenal and the palace, the complete transformation of the old fairground, and the new Schafweide tram line. The concept of the anniversary of the city was for a diverse range of events rather than a single central event.

In 2023, Mannheim again hosted the Bundesgartenschau 2023 (Federal Garden Show); after first hosting in 1975.

On 31 May 2024, a mass stabbing took place at a counter-jihad BPE rally in the market square. A police officer was killed and six others, including guest speaker Michael Stürzenberger, were injured. The suspect confessed to having Islamist motivations behind the attack, which was meant to be an assassination attempt on Stürzenberger for his criticism of Islam.

On 3 March 2025, a car was intentionally driven into a crowd at Paradeplatz. Two pedestrians were killed and 14 were injured. The suspect, who had a history of mental health issues, as well as previous convictions for assault and hate speech, refused to give motivations for the attack.

== Geography ==
=== Climate ===
Mannheim features a temperate oceanic climate (Köppen: Cfb, Trewartha: Dobk). The city is located in Germany's warmest summer region, the "Rhine shift". The highest recorded temperature was 40.0 °C (104 °F) on 27 June 2026.

In comparison to other regions of Germany, Mannheim has a higher humidity in summer, causing a higher heat index. Snow is rare, even in the cold months. Precipitation occurs mostly during afternoon thunderstorms during warmer weather (average days with thunderstorms annually is 40–50). The climate in this area has mild differences between highs and lows, and there is adequate rainfall year-round. The city is one of the warmest in Germany in winter.

Climate data for Mannheim (1991–2020 normals)
| Month | Jan | Feb | Mar | Apr | May | Jun | Jul | Aug | Sep | Oct | Nov | Dec | Year |
|---|---|---|---|---|---|---|---|---|---|---|---|---|---|
| Record high °C (°F) | 16.9 (62.4) | 20.2 (68.4) | 26.1 (79.0) | 32.0 (89.6) | 33.2 (91.8) | 40.0 (104.0) | 39.0 (102.2) | 39.8 (103.6) | 34.3 (93.7) | 28.5 (83.3) | 22.6 (72.7) | 17.5 (63.5) | 40.0 (104.0) |
| Mean daily maximum °C (°F) | 5.3 (41.5) | 7.3 (45.1) | 12.2 (54.0) | 17.2 (63.0) | 21.0 (69.8) | 24.5 (76.1) | 26.7 (80.1) | 26.5 (79.7) | 21.6 (70.9) | 15.5 (59.9) | 9.3 (48.7) | 6.1 (43.0) | 16.1 (61.0) |
| Daily mean °C (°F) | 2.7 (36.9) | 3.9 (39.0) | 7.1 (44.8) | 11.3 (52.3) | 15.3 (59.5) | 18.8 (65.8) | 20.7 (69.3) | 20.3 (68.5) | 15.8 (60.4) | 10.9 (51.6) | 6.2 (43.2) | 3.4 (38.1) | 11.3 (52.3) |
| Mean daily minimum °C (°F) | 0.2 (32.4) | 0.5 (32.9) | 2.1 (35.8) | 5.1 (41.2) | 9.2 (48.6) | 12.7 (54.9) | 14.6 (58.3) | 14.4 (57.9) | 10.6 (51.1) | 6.7 (44.1) | 2.8 (37.0) | 0.7 (33.3) | 6.5 (43.7) |
| Record low °C (°F) | −18.7 (−1.7) | −21.1 (−6.0) | −13.6 (7.5) | −6.4 (20.5) | −0.1 (31.8) | 4.0 (39.2) | 4.7 (40.5) | 5.3 (41.5) | 2.5 (36.5) | −5.0 (23.0) | −8.7 (16.3) | −18.3 (−0.9) | −21.1 (−6.0) |
| Average precipitation mm (inches) | 41.9 (1.65) | 40.6 (1.60) | 42.3 (1.67) | 40.5 (1.59) | 67.6 (2.66) | 63.8 (2.51) | 71.2 (2.80) | 61.7 (2.43) | 50.0 (1.97) | 53.0 (2.09) | 52.9 (2.08) | 55.0 (2.17) | 640.5 (25.22) |
| Average precipitation days (≥ 1.0 mm) | 15.1 | 13.9 | 13.5 | 12.0 | 14.4 | 13.0 | 14.4 | 13.5 | 11.8 | 13.8 | 15.5 | 17.2 | 168.3 |
| Average snowy days (≥ 1.0 cm) | 5.7 | 3.1 | 1.0 | 0 | 0 | 0 | 0 | 0 | 0 | 0 | 0.6 | 3.0 | 13.4 |
| Average relative humidity (%) | 82.4 | 77.8 | 70.7 | 64.8 | 67.0 | 66.0 | 65.2 | 66.6 | 72.9 | 81.3 | 85.4 | 84.9 | 73.7 |
| Mean monthly sunshine hours | 56.0 | 82.1 | 135.9 | 190.8 | 216.9 | 225.6 | 235.6 | 224.2 | 169.7 | 108.1 | 56.1 | 44.1 | 1,733.7 |
Source 1: World Meteorological Organization
Source 2: Data derived from Deutscher Wetterdienst

Climate data for Mannheim 2019–present
| Month | Jan | Feb | Mar | Apr | May | Jun | Jul | Aug | Sep | Oct | Nov | Dec | Year |
|---|---|---|---|---|---|---|---|---|---|---|---|---|---|
| Mean daily maximum °C (°F) | 7.2 (45.0) | 11.3 (52.3) | 13.0 (55.4) | 19.1 (66.4) | 19.3 (66.7) | 25.9 (78.6) | 27.5 (81.5) | 27.6 (81.7) | 21.4 (70.5) | 16.6 (61.9) | 8.7 (47.7) | 7.6 (45.7) | 17.1 (62.8) |
| Daily mean °C (°F) | 4.4 (39.9) | 6.1 (43.0) | 8.2 (46.8) | 12.3 (54.1) | 13.7 (56.7) | 19.9 (67.8) | 21.0 (69.8) | 20.9 (69.6) | 16.0 (60.8) | 12.6 (54.7) | 6.0 (42.8) | 4.8 (40.6) | 12.2 (53.9) |
| Mean daily minimum °C (°F) | 1.0 (33.8) | 1.6 (34.9) | 3.1 (37.6) | 4.8 (40.6) | 7.0 (44.6) | 12.9 (55.2) | 13.8 (56.8) | 14.8 (58.6) | 10.2 (50.4) | 9.0 (48.2) | 3.0 (37.4) | 1.9 (35.4) | 6.9 (44.5) |
| Average precipitation mm (inches) | 15.6 (0.61) | 49.3 (1.94) | 35.7 (1.41) | 22.6 (0.89) | 55.4 (2.18) | 81.4 (3.20) | 38.3 (1.51) | 63.3 (2.49) | 77.1 (3.04) | 89.9 (3.54) | 48.6 (1.91) | 52.3 (2.06) | 629.5 (24.78) |
| Average snowfall cm (inches) | 4.0 (1.6) | 1.6 (0.6) | 1.2 (0.5) | 0 (0) | 0 (0) | 0 (0) | 0 (0) | 0 (0) | 0 (0) | 1.0 (0.4) | 2.0 (0.8) | 5.6 (2.2) | 2.6 (1.0) |
| Mean monthly sunshine hours | 57.3 | 116.2 | 164.0 | 251.2 | 247.9 | 268.1 | 286.1 | 248.9 | 199.1 | 97.5 | 38.2 | 53.4 | 2,027.9 |
Source: Deutscher Wetterdienst

== Demographics ==
=== Population ===
Historical population
| Year | Pop. | ±% |
|---|---|---|
| 1450 | 570 | — |
| 1663 | 3,000 | +426.3% |
| 1729 | 15,760 | +425.3% |
| 1777 | 25,353 | +60.9% |
| 1802 | 18,818 | −25.8% |
| 1852 | 24,316 | +29.2% |
| 1871 | 39,606 | +62.9% |
| 1890 | 79,058 | +99.6% |
| 1895 | 97,780 | +23.7% |
| 1900 | 141,131 | +44.3% |
| 1919 | 229,576 | +62.7% |
| 1925 | 247,486 | +7.8% |
| 1933 | 275,162 | +11.2% |
| 1939 | 284,957 | +3.6% |
| 1945 | 186,310 | −34.6% |
| 1950 | 245,634 | +31.8% |
| 1956 | 287,210 | +16.9% |
| 1961 | 313,890 | +9.3% |
| 1966 | 329,301 | +4.9% |
| 1971 | 332,378 | +0.9% |
| 1976 | 309,059 | −7.0% |
| 1981 | 304,219 | −1.6% |
| 1986 | 294,648 | −3.1% |
| 1990 | 310,411 | +5.3% |
| 2001 | 308,385 | −0.7% |
| 2011 | 290,117 | −5.9% |
| 2022 | 313,693 | +8.1% |
Population size may be affected by changes in administrative divisions.

Mannheim, with a population of 315,000, is the 2nd largest city in Baden-Württemberg. Its location near the Rhine and Neckar rivers spurred Mannheim's industrialization and transition into a major city in the early 19th century. The city was heavily damaged during WWII but soon regained prominence as an industrial centre, causing rapid population growth in the 1950s. Many motor, electronic and power plant companies came to Mannheim and other cities in the Rhine-Neckar Region, including Ludwigshafen and Heidelberg. The population of Mannheim started to decline in the 1980s but began to rebound in the 2010s, partially due to its large university population.

==== Nationalities ====
The following list shows the most significant groups of foreigners in the city of Mannheim by nationalities. In total 49.4% of all Mannheim inhabitants have descent from 168 nationalities. The Neckarstadt-West district has the biggest foreign population with 68.9%, while the Wallstadt district has the smallest with 23.1%. A large proportion of the immigrants are from the Balkans and European countries.

| Rank | Nationality | Population (31 December 2024) |
|---|---|---|
| 1 | Turkey | 29.054 |
| 2 | Poland | 15.072 |
| 3 | Italy | 10.920 |
| 4 | Romania | 8.990 |
| 5 | Bulgaria | 8.260 |
| 6 | Ukraine | 5.888 |
| 7 | Croatia | 5.546 |
| 8 | Russia | 4.507 |
| 9 | Greece | 4.357 |
| 10 | Syria | 3.685 |
| 11 | India | 3.435 |
| 12 | Kazakhstan | 3.276 |
| 13 | Bosnia and Herzegovina | 2.768 |
| 14 | Spain | 2.532 |
| 15 | Iraq | 2.481 |

==== Religion ====
The distribution of Mannheim's population by religious affiliation (as of 31 December 2020) is Roman Catholic 25.4%, Protestant 20.0%, and other/none 54.6%.

== Culture ==
=== Theatre ===
The National Theatre Mannheim was founded in 1779 and is the oldest "Stage" in Germany. In 1782 the premiere of Die Räuber, written by Friedrich Schiller, was given.

Recently, smaller stages have opened, such as the Oststadt-Theater, the TIG7 (Theater im Quadrat G7), the Theater Oliv, the Freilichtbühne, the Theater31, the Theater ImPuls, the Theater Felina-Areal, the Mannheimer Puppenspiele, the Kleinkunstbühne Klapsmühl', Schatzkistl, and zeitraumexit.

=== Sport ===
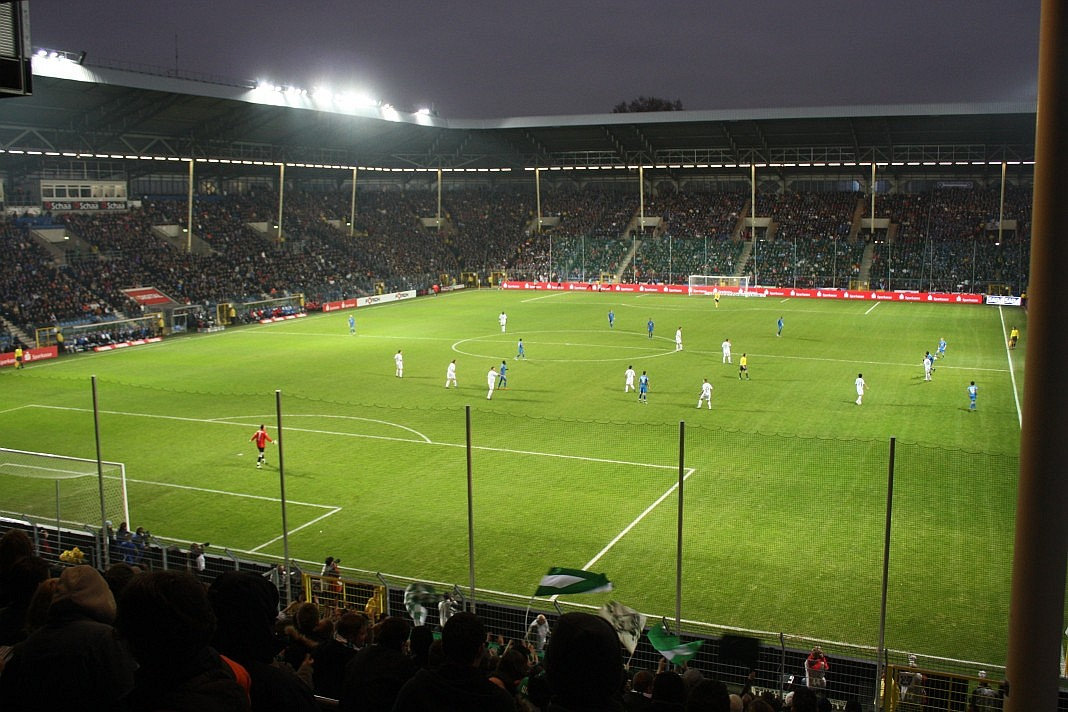
Carl-Benz-Stadion, the home stadium of SV Waldhof Mannheim

There are two nationally renowned football clubs in Mannheim. SV Waldhof Mannheim currently play in the third tier 3. Liga, but previously appeared in the top tier Bundesliga. VfR Mannheim, winners of the German championship in 1949, now play in the sixth tier Verbandsliga Baden.

Adler Mannheim (formerly MERC, Mannheimer Eis- und Rollsport-Club) is an ice hockey team that plays in the professional Deutsche Eishockey Liga. They have won the German championship a total of eight times (7 times the Deutsche Eishockey Liga and once the former Bundesliga).

The city is home to the Mannheim Tornados, the oldest operational baseball and softball club in Germany. The Tornados play in the first division of the Baseball Bundesliga and have won the championship 11 times, more than any other club.

In 2003, the American football club Rhein-Neckar Bandits was founded. They play in the first German Football League (also known as GFL1). As of 2018, between 500 and 900 people watch each game.

Rhein-Neckar Löwen are a handball team who play in the professional German Handball League and have won the German Championship twice.

The WWE visited Mannheim in 2008 where around 10,000 fans attended the event.

UFC fighter Dennis Siver lives and trains in Mannheim.

The Maimarkt-Turnier Mannheim is an annual international horse show held during the Mannheimer Maimarkt since 1964. Mannheim hosted the European Show Jumping Championships in 1997, and the FEI European Jumping Championships in 2007.

In 2002, Hobby horse polo was invented in Mannheim.

=== Inventions ===
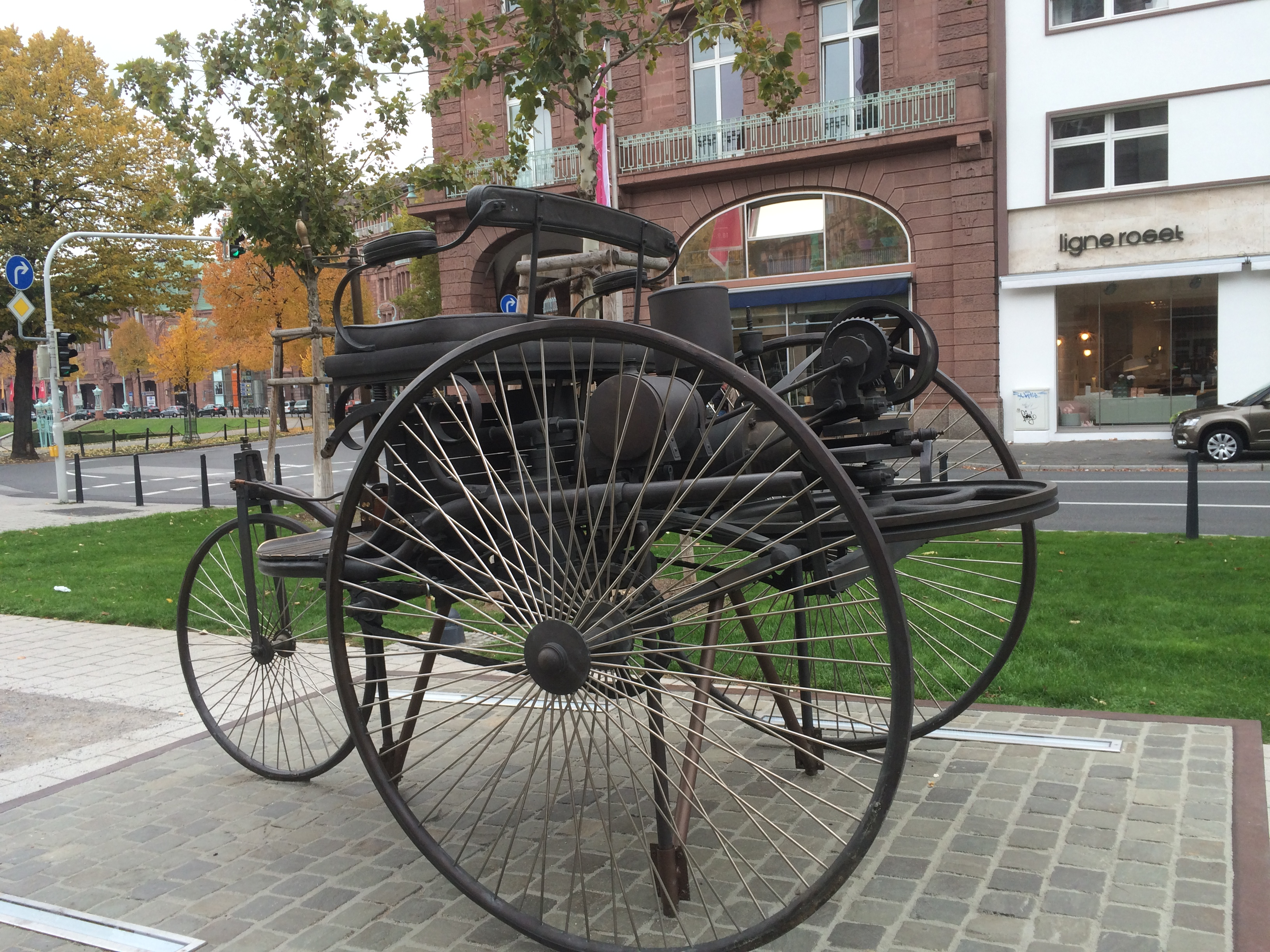
Monument of first car, in Mannheim

Many significant inventions originate from Mannheim:

- Karl Drais built the first two-wheeled draisine in 1817, the first bicycle in history.
- Karl Benz drove the first automobile in history on the streets of Mannheim in 1886. He had produced a three-wheeled vehicle powered by a single cylinder petrol/gasoline-fueled engine. In August 1888, Karl's wife Bertha Benz undertook the world's first road trip by automobile from Mannheim to Pforzheim and back, a journey of roughly 65 miles.
- The Lanz Bulldog, a popular tractor with a rugged, simple Diesel engine was developed in 1921.
- Karl Benz developed the world's first compact diesel-powered car at the Benz & Cie. motor works in Mannheim in 1923.
- Julius Hatry built the world's first rocket plane in 1929.
- Dario Fontanella, an Italian guest worker, invented Spaghettieis (spaghetti ice cream) in 1969.
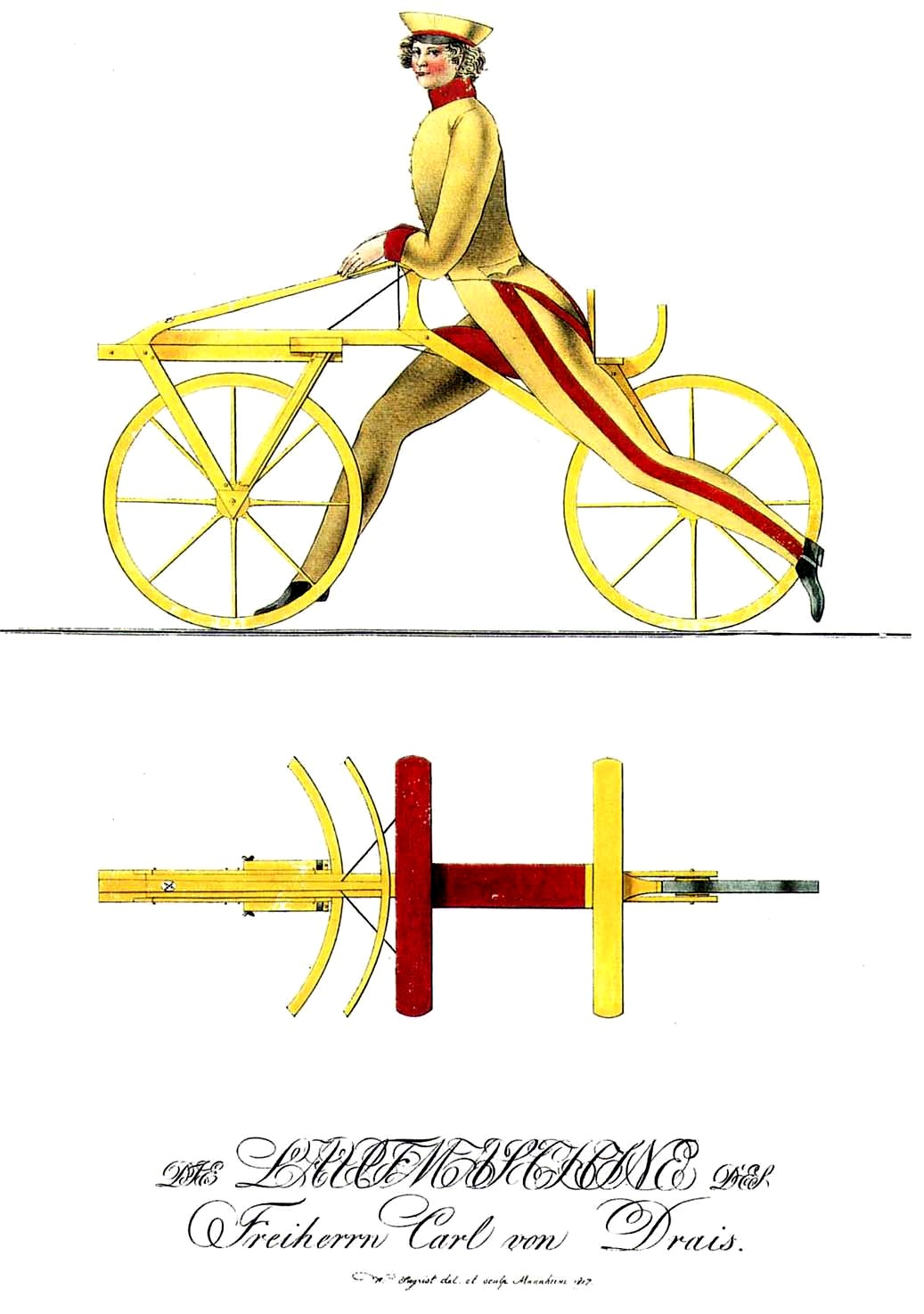
The world's first bicycle, built in Mannheim by Karl Freiherr von Drais in 1817

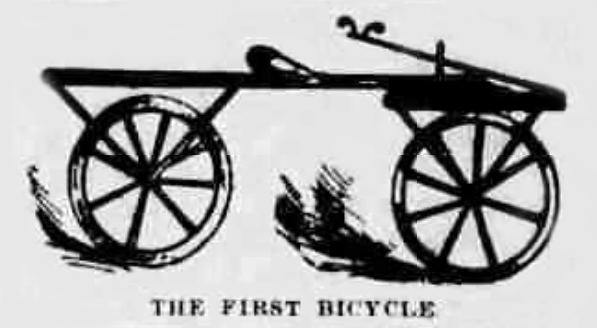
The first bicycle by Von Drais

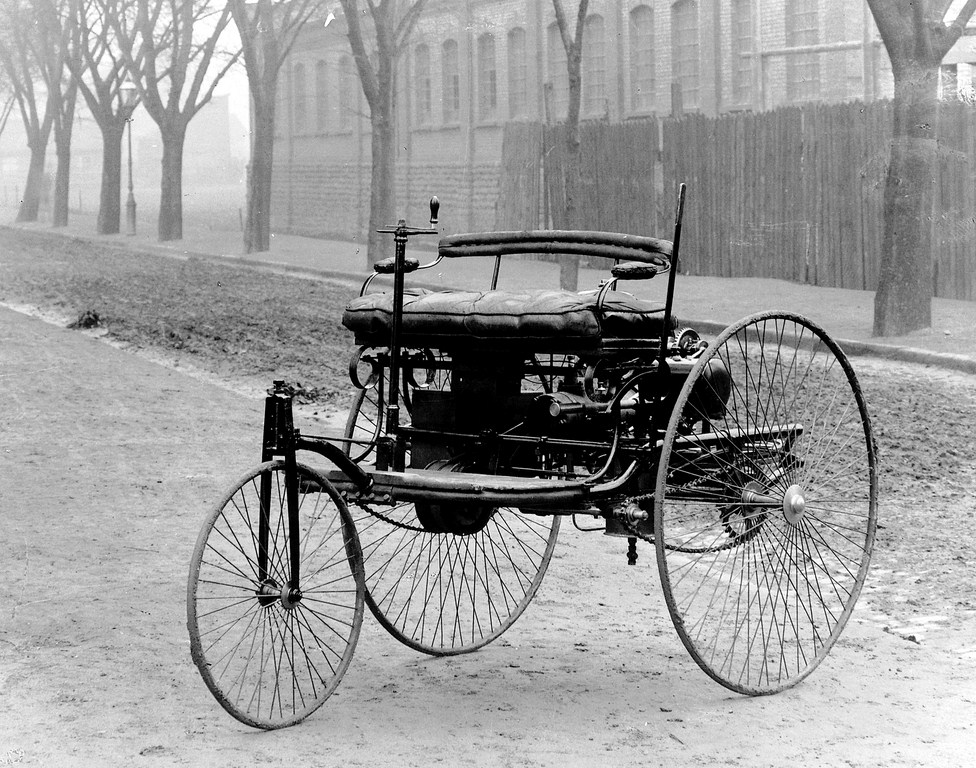
The world's first automobile, built in Mannheim by Karl Benz in 1885

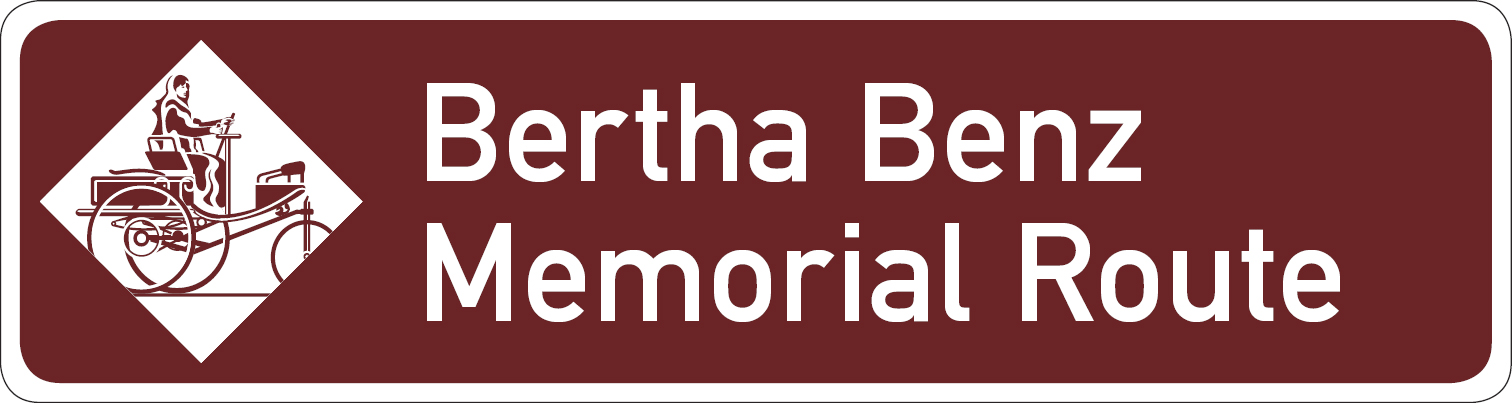
Official sign of Bertha Benz Memorial Route, commemorating the world's first long-distance journey by automobile from Mannheim to Pforzheim in 1888 104 km (65 mi)

== Education ==
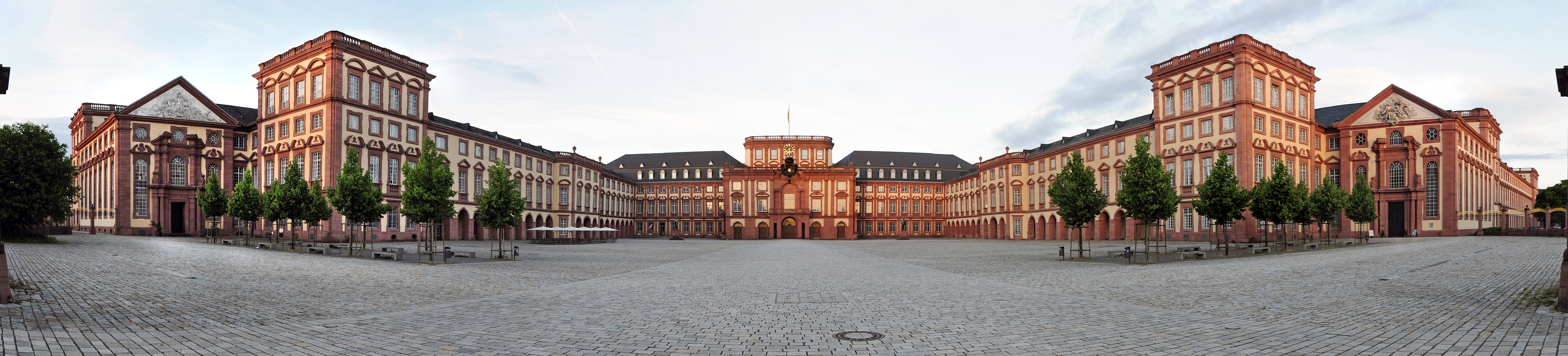
The University of Mannheim's main campus – the Palace in a 180-degree panoramic view

The University of Mannheim is one of Germany's younger universities. Although founded in 1967, it has its origins in the Palatine Academy of Sciences, established in 1763, and the former Handelshochschule (Commercial College), founded in 1907. Situated in Mannheim Palace, it is Germany's leading university in the fields of business and economics and attracts students from around the world. Described by Die Zeit as the 'Harvard of Germany', it is seen as the training grounds of German business leaders. Just under 12,000 students were enrolled at the end of 2024.

The university town also houses one of the medical schools of Heidelberg University (at the University Hospital Mannheim), the Hochschule Mannheim, a branch of the Duale Hochschule of the State of Baden-Württemberg and several musical and theatrical academies, including the Pop Academy Mannheim, the Musikhochschule and the Theaterakademie. These institutions draw a large and diverse student body.

Dependents of U.S. military personnel attended Mannheim Elementary School until it closed in June 2012. In the 1980s the school had 2,200 students.

== Government and politics ==
=== Mayor ===
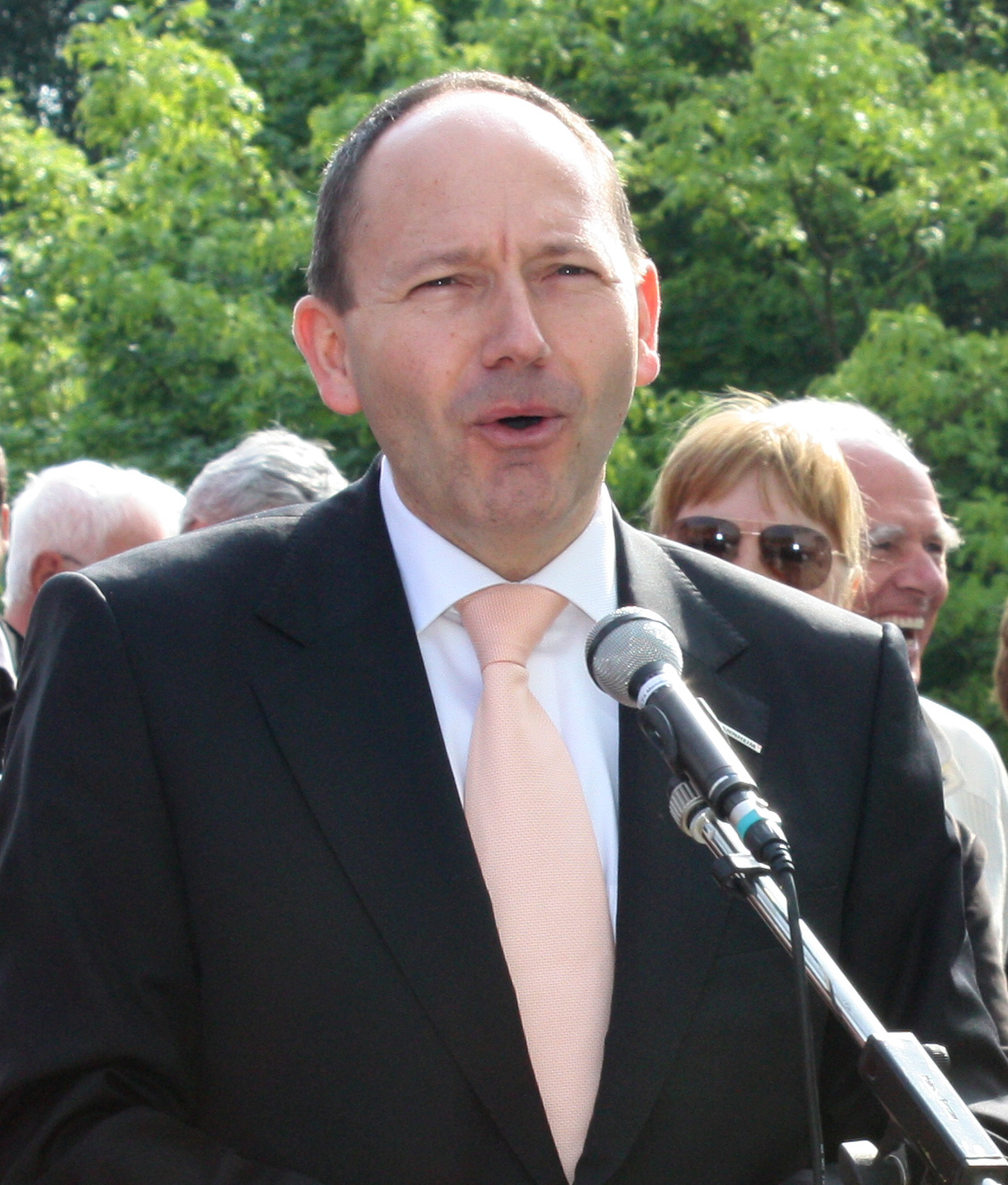
Christian Specht in 2011

The mayor is the head of the city council and chairman of the council, being selected by direct suffrage for a term of eight years. The current mayor is Christian Specht from the Christian Democratic Union (CDU).

In 2023, Specht ran in the election for mayor of Mannheim, in which incumbent Peter Kurz (SPD) did not contest the election, and was supported by the CDU Mannheim, the Mannheimer Liste and the FDP Mannheim. In the first round of voting, on 18 June 2023, he received 45.64% of the vote. On 9 July 2023 he won the second round of voting with 49.9% of the vote, ahead of SPD candidate Thorsten Riehle (48.7%) and independent candidate Uğur Çakir (1.3%). Due to an objection to the election results, Specht was initially elected as appointed mayor by the city council. The objection was rejected by the Karlsruhe Regional Council on 2 August 2023, making Specht's election valid. He took office on August 4, 2023, making him the first CDU mayor in Mannheim since Josef Braun (1945–1948).

| Candidate | Party | First round | | Second round | |
| Candidate | Party | Votes | % | Votes | % |
|---|---|---|---|---|---|
| Christian Specht | Christian Democratic Union | 34,329 | 45.6 | 35,981 | 49.9 |
| Thorsten Riehle | Social Democratic Party | 22,748 | 30.2 | 35,122 | 48.7 |
| Raymond Fojkar | Alliance 90/The Greens | 10,379 | 13.8 | Withdrew | |
| Thomas Bischoff | Die PARTEI | 2,327 | 3.3 | Withdrew | |
| David Frey | Independent | 1,081 | 1.4 | Withdrew | |
| Tanja Krone | Independent | 903 | 1.2 | Withdrew | |
| Uğur Çakir | Independent | 638 | 0.85 | 947 | 1.3 |
| Others | | 41 | 0.1 | 70 | 0.1 |
| Valid votes | | 75,222 | 99.4 | 72,120 | 99.4 |
| Invalid votes | | 467 | 0.6 | 415 | 0.6 |
| Total | | 75,689 | 100.0 | 72,535 | 100.0 |
| Electorate/voter turnout | | 234,942 | 32.2 | 234,861 | 30.9 |
Source: City of Mannheim

The city leaders since 1810 are:

- 1810–1820: Johann Wilhelm Reinhardt
- 1820–1832: Valentin Möhl
- 1833–1835: Heinrich Andriano
- 1836–1849: Ludwig Jolly
- 1849–1852: Friedrich Reiß
- 1852–1861: Heinrich Christian Diffené
- 1861–1870: Ludwig Achenbach
- 1870–1891: Eduard Moll
- 1891–1908: Otto Beck
- 1908–1913: Paul Martin
- 1914–1928: Theodor Kutzer
- 1928–1933: Hermann Heimerich (SPD)
- 1933–1945: Carl Renninger (NSDAP)
- 1945–1948: Josef Braun (CDU)
- 1948–1949: Fritz Cahn-Garnier (SPD)
- 1949–1955: Hermann Heimerich (SPD)
- 1956–1972: Hans Reschke (independent)
- 1972–1980: Ludwig Ratzel (SPD)
- 1980–1983: Wilhelm Varnholt (SPD)
- 1983–2007: Gerhard Widder (SPD)
- 2007–2023: Peter Kurz (SPD)
- 2023–present: Christian Specht (CDU)

=== City council ===
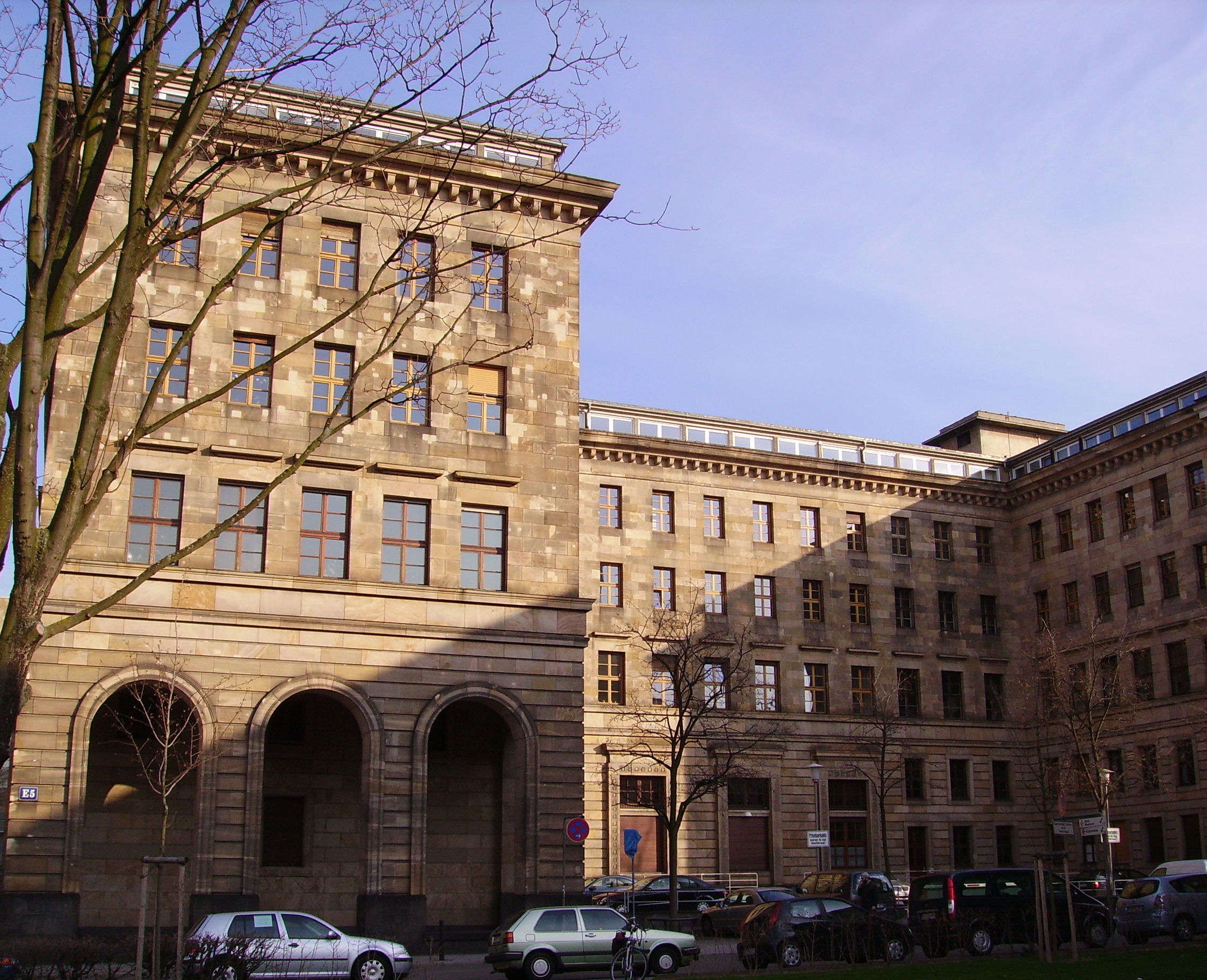
Town hall in E 5

The council has 48 seats and is elected by direct suffrage every five years. In the local elections in Baden-Württemberg, voters are allowed to take advantage of cumulative voting and vote splitting. Since the Second World War, the SPD has received more votes than the CDU in all elections except for 1999, 2004, and 2024. In the 2019 election, the Greens received the most votes for the first time.

The most recent city council election was held on 9 June 2024, and the results were as follows:

| Party | Votes | % | +/- | Seats | +/- |
|---|---|---|---|---|---|
| Christian Democratic Union (CDU) | 1,110,883 | 21.6 | ▲2.5 | 10 | ▲1 |
| Alliance 90/The Greens (Grüne) | 1,035,384 | 20.1 | ▼4.3 | 9 | ▼3 |
| Social Democratic Party (SPD) | 952,919 | 18.5 | ▼2.7 | 9 | ▼1 |
| Alternative for Germany (AfD) | 731,679 | 14.2 | ▲5.0 | 7 | ▲3 |
| Free Voters/Mannheimer List (ML) | 346,759 | 6.7 | ▼0.7 | 3 | ▼1 |
| Free Democratic Party (FDP) | 276,672 | 5.4 | ▼0.7 | 3 | 0 |
| The Left (Die Linke) | 254,373 | 4.9 | ▼1.1 | 2 | ▼1 |
| Animal Protection Party (Tierschutz) | 112,496 | 2.2 | ▲1.1 | 1 | 0 |
| Die PARTEI (PARTEI) | 108,638 | 2.1 | ▼0.9 | 1 | 0 |
| Middle-Class for Mannheim (MfM) | 76,555 | 1.5 | ▲0.2 | 1 | 0 |
| The Mannheimers | 64,393 | 1.3 | New | 1 | New |
| Climate List Baden-Württemberg (Klima) | 59,228 | 1.2 | New | 1 | New |
| Protect the Cars | 12,632 | 0.2 | New | 0 | New |
| Valid votes | 5,142,611 | 100.0 | | | |
| Invalid ballots | 2,479 | 2.1 | | | |
| Total ballots | 120,729 | 100.0 | | 48 | ±0 |
| Electorate/voter turnout | 238,394 | 51.5 | ▲1.7 | | |
Source: City of Mannheim

== United States military installations ==
A number of U.S. Army Europe installations were located in and near to Mannheim during the Cold War. The following locations provided services to and housed the "U.S. Army Garrison Mannheim" and other units of the U.S. Army. The U.S. Army Garrison Mannheim was formally deactivated on 31 May 2011.

- Coleman Barracks and Coleman Army Airfield (Mannheim-Sandhofen): the headquarters of the American Forces Network-Europe, and the location of the United States Army Corrections Facility-Europe.
- Funari Barracks (Mannheim-Käfertal), vacated in 2014.
- Spinelli Barracks (Mannheim-Feudenheim), vacated in 2015, the home of the Army's 28th Transportation Battalion.
- Sullivan Barracks (Mannheim-Käfertal): formerly the headquarters of the U.S. Army's 7th Signal Brigade and the 529th Military Police Honor Guard Company's 2nd Platoon; vacated in 2014.
- Taylor Barracks (Mannheim-Vogelstang): formerly the headquarters of the U.S. Army's 2nd Signal Brigade; vacated in 2011.
- Turley Barracks (Mannheim-Käfertal): in the early 1990s was home to the 181st Transportation Bn, with companies of 40th, 41st, 51st, 590th, TTP, and HHC transportation companies and also the headquarters of the NATO ACE Mobile Force (Land) (AMFL).
- The Benjamin Franklin Village (Mannheim-Käfertal), housing. Also home to the Mannheim American High School and the Middle School, which closed on 9 June 2011 before the last soldier and his family moved out in 2012.

The following locations were part of the "U.S. Army Garrison Heidelberg" but were within the area of the city of Mannheim until they were vacated in 2010 and 2011:

- Friedrichsfeld Service Center (Mannheim-Friedrichsfeld)
- Hammonds Barracks (formerly Loretto Kaserne) (Mannheim-Seckenheim)
- Stem Kaserne (Mannheim-Seckenheim)

All personnel of the U.S. Army military community left Mannheim by 2015, some of them moving to Wiesbaden. With the exception of four barracks, all other barracks formerly occupied by the U.S. military had been returned to the German state for conversion to civilian use in 2011.

== Main sights ==
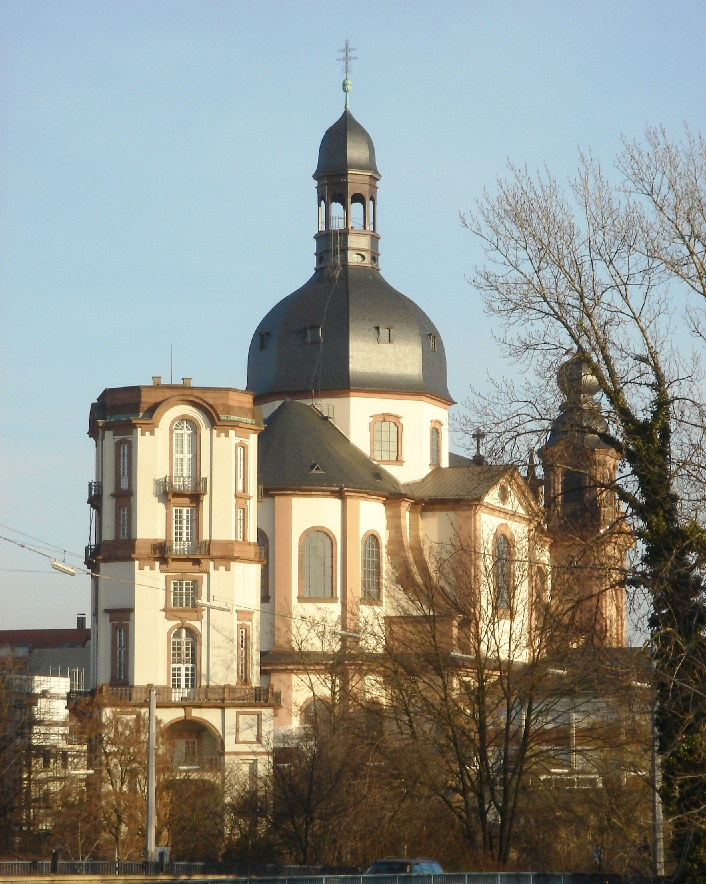
Jesuit Church (background) and Sternwarte (defunct observatory; in the foreground)

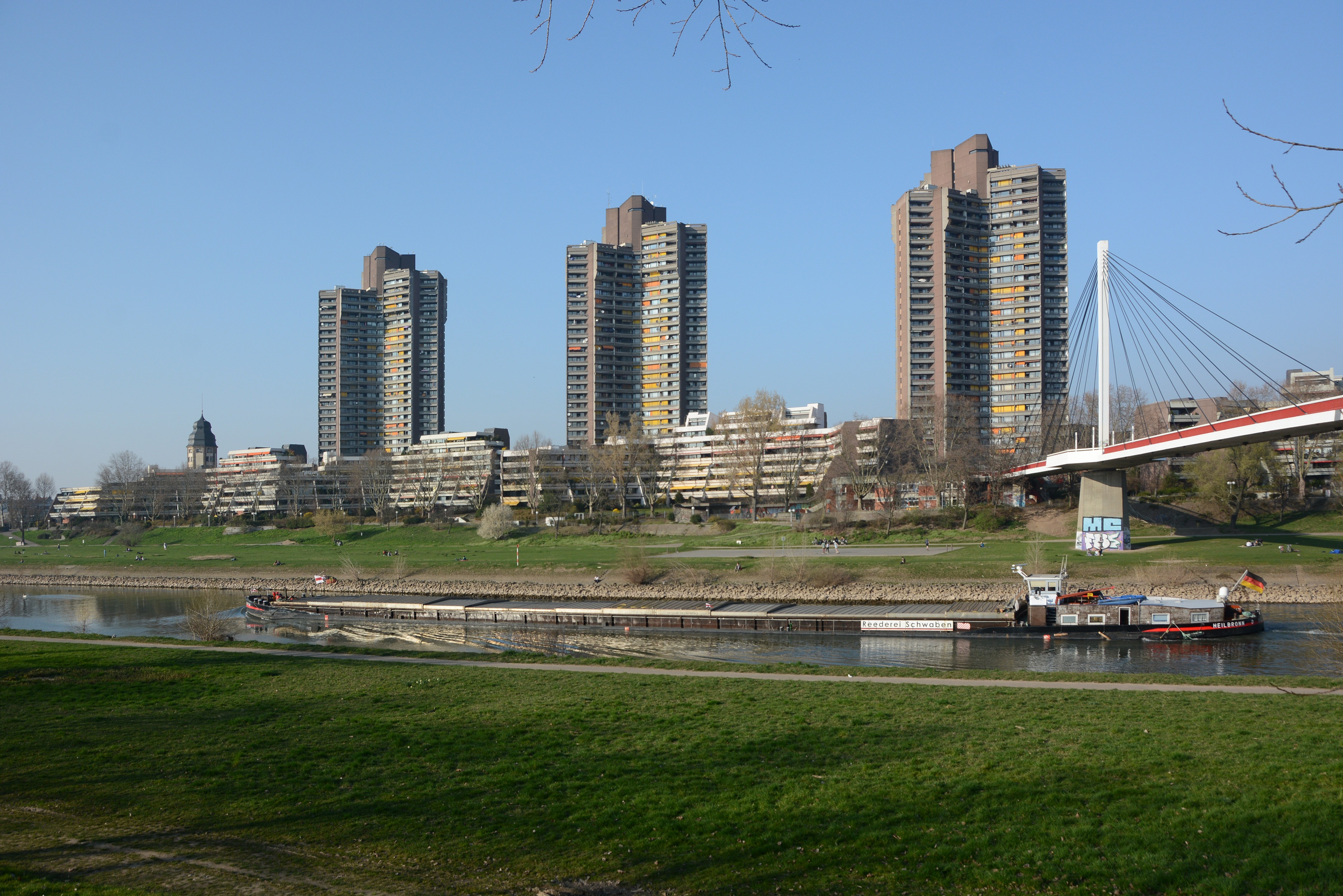
Neckaruferbebauung Nord in 2014

- Fernmeldeturm Mannheim – 217.8-metre-high telecommunication tower, landmark of Mannheim
- Synagoge (Mannheim) – post World War II synagogue
- Yavuz Sultan Selim Mosque
- Luisenpark – named one of the most beautiful parks in Europe with around 1.2 million visitors annually
- Mannheim Palace (Mannheimer Schloss) – the city castle, main building of the University of Mannheim and second-largest palace complex in Baroque style after Versailles
- Wasserturm (Mannheim) – the town's landmark water tower
- Jesuit Church
- SAP Arena – multifunctional indoor arena, home of Mannheim's ice-hockey team "Die Adler" ("The Eagles")
- Breite Strasse, Kunststrasse, and Kapuzinerplanken – Mannheim's main shopping destinations
- International Filmfestival Mannheim-Heidelberg
- Kunsthalle Mannheim – museum of modern and contemporary art
- Technoseum – technology museum
- Multihalle – multi-purpose hall in Mannheim's Herzogenriedpark, the world's largest self-supporting wooden lattice-shell construction
- Wildpark and Waldvogelpark am Karlstern
- The city centre – designed in squares (Quadratestadt)
- Reißinsel – a natural area bequeathed to the residents of Mannheim by honorary citizen Carl Reiß
- Reiss Engelhorn Museum – museum with four exhibition halls presenting exhibits in archaeology, world cultures, history of art and culture, photography, and history of theater and music
- Maimarkt – largest regional trade fair in Germany
- Marktplatz (Market square) – hosts a farmers' market every Tuesday, Thursday, and Saturday. Fresh fruit, vegetables, and flowers are sold.
- Mannheimer Mess (Mannheim Fair) – twice a year (spring & autumn), a big fair that takes place on Neuer Messplatz-square

== Economy ==
With a gross domestic product (GDP) of €20.921 billion, Mannheim ranks 17th on the list of German cities by GDP as of 2018.

In the 2019 edition of the Zukunftsatlas, the independent city of Mannheim ranked 35th out of 401 counties and independent cities in Germany, making it one of the places with "high future opportunities".

Mannheim is among the most attractive business locations in Germany thanks to its competitive business environment and growth opportunities and is considered the economic centre of the Rhine-Neckar Metropolitan Region, which is one of Germany's most important business locations.

The New Economy Magazine elected Mannheim under the 20 cities that best represent the world of tomorrow, emphasizing Mannheim's positive economic and innovative environment.

The unemployment rate of Mannheim is 7.2% as of 2020.

The successor to the Karl Benz automobile manufacturing companies begun in Mannheim, Daimler AG, has had a large presence in Mannheim. Today, diesel engines and buses are assembled there. The Swiss Hoffmann–La Roche diagnostic group (formerly known as Boehringer Mannheim) has its division headquarters in Mannheim. Additionally, the city hosts large factories, headquarters and/or offices of ABB, IBM, Alstom, BASF (Ludwigshafen), Bilfinger Berger, Reckitt Benckiser, Unilever, Essity, Phoenix Group, Bombardier, Pepperl+Fuchs, Caterpillar, Fuchs Petrolub, John Deere, Siemens, SCA, Südzucker, and other companies. The University Hospital Mannheim provides health care to the inhabitants of Mannheim and the Rhine-Neckar Metropolitan Region.

With a market value of €4.5 billion for its DAX, TecDAX and MDAX companies, Mannheim ranks 22nd on the list of German cities.

Alugha is a Mannheim-based multilingual video-hosting platform offering AI-powered transcription, translation, and dubbing.

MVV Energie based in Mannheim is the largest municipal energy supplier in Germany.

== Media ==
The regional public broadcaster, SWR, has a broadcast centre and studios in Mannheim.

In addition to the only local daily newspaper Mannheimer Morgen; the Ludwigshafen newspaper Die Rheinpfalz, the Heidelberg newspaper Rhein-Neckar-Zeitung and the Bild Rhein-Neckar offer a local section for Mannheim. The Wochenblatt Mannheim is also published weekly whilst the Kommunal-Info Mannheim is published fortnightly. Free district newspapers are distributed in almost all parts of the city.

== Transport ==
=== Road transport ===
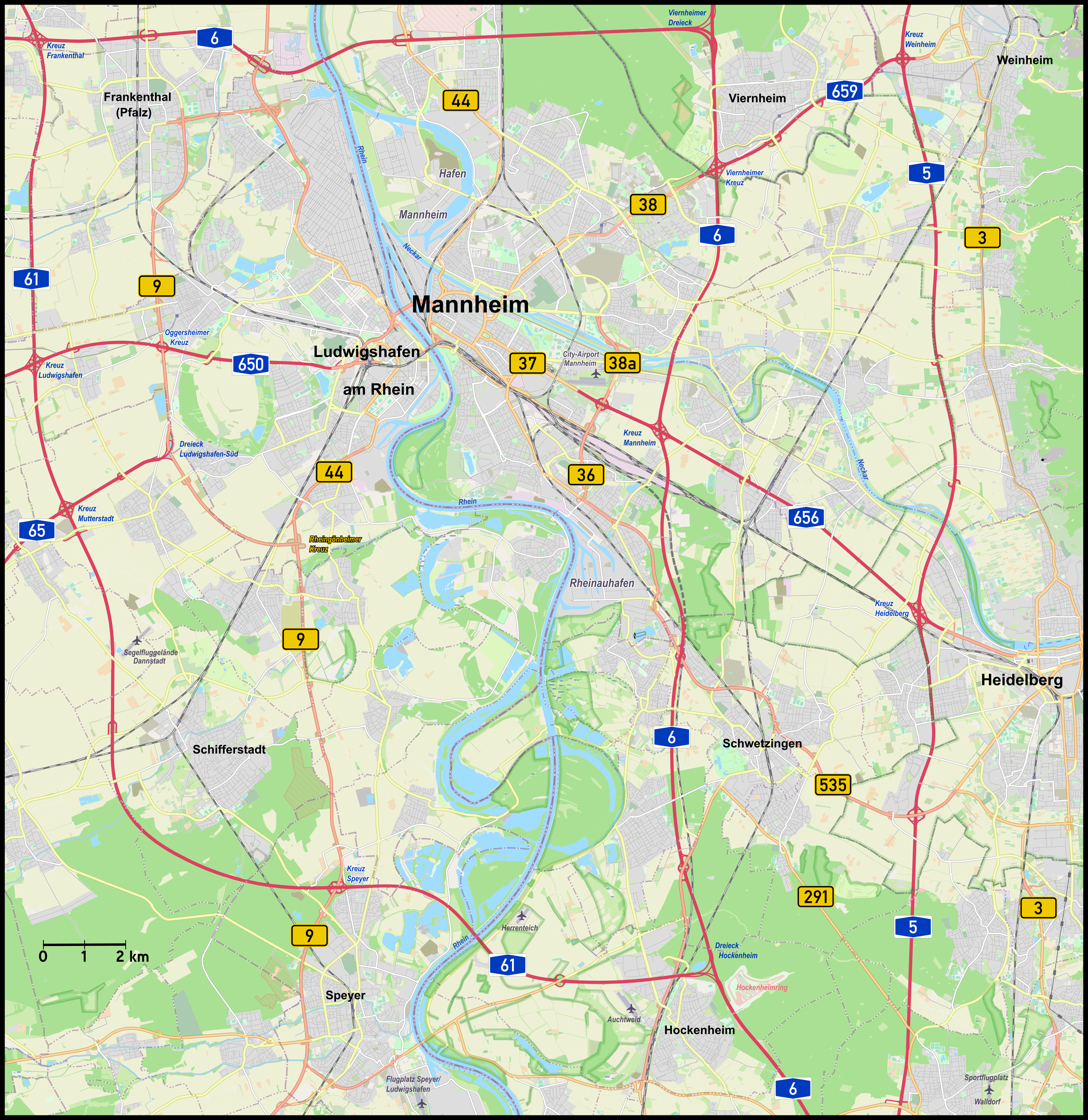
Roadmap of Mannheim

The Mannheim/Ludwigshafen area is surrounded by a ring of motorways connecting it to Frankfurt in the north, Karlsruhe in the south, Saarbrücken in the west and Nuremberg in the east.

=== Railway transport ===
Mannheim Hauptbahnhof (central station) is the terminal of the Mannheim-Stuttgart high-speed rail line and the most important railway junction in southwestern Germany. It is served by the ICE high-speed train system via the routes Frankfurt am Main–Berlin, Karlsruhe–Basel, and Stuttgart–Munich. A new high speed line to Frankfurt is also planned to relieve the existing Mannheim–Frankfurt railway.

=== River transport ===
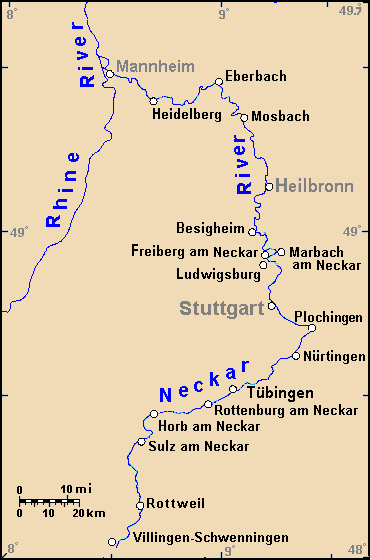
Mannheim on the Rivers Rhine and Neckar

Mannheim Harbour is the second-largest river port in Germany and is 1131 hectares. In 2016, 6.9 million tons of goods were handled on the water side. Around 500 companies, with about 20,000 employees, work in the harbour.

=== Air transport ===
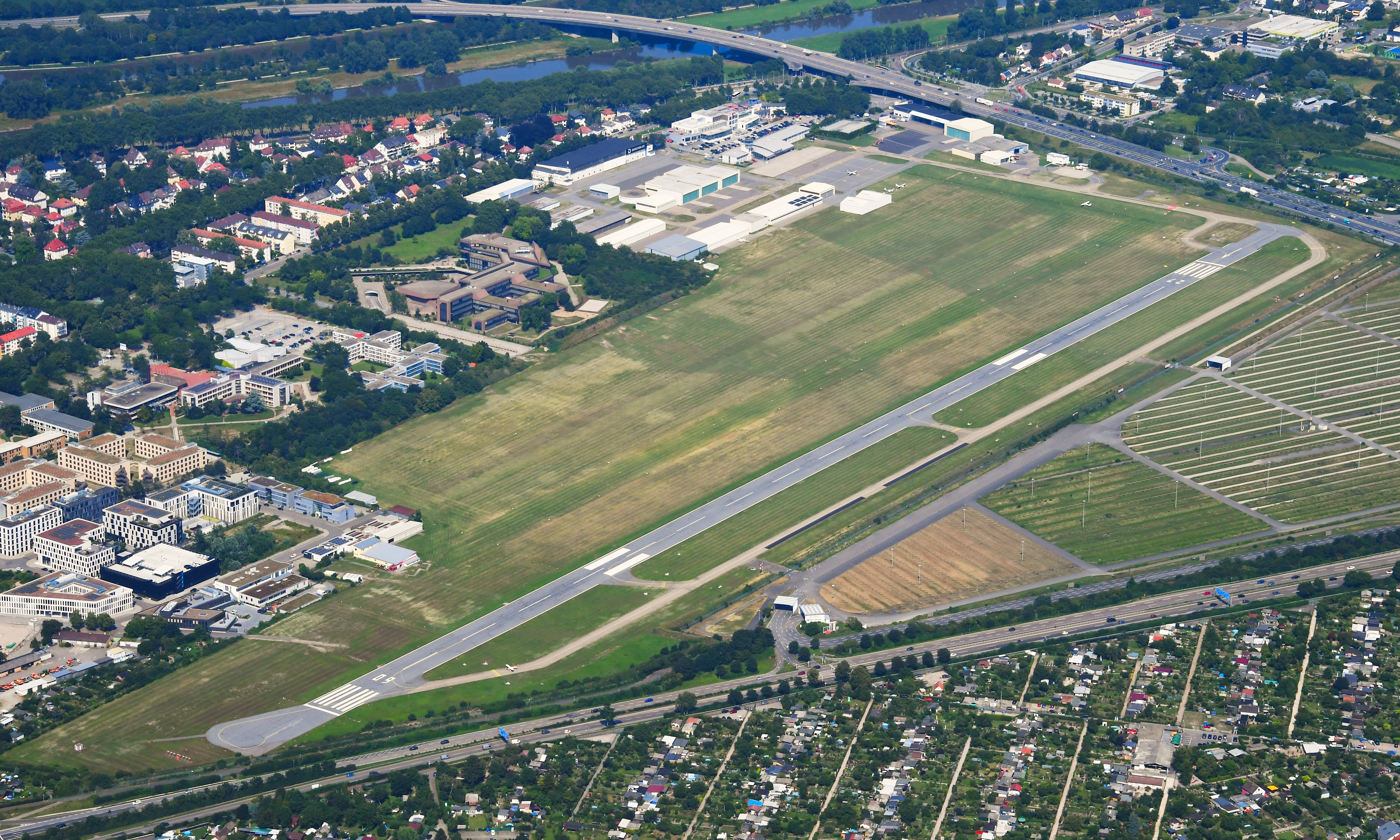
Mannheim City Airport

Although Frankfurt International Airport is only 65 km (40 mi) to the north, at various times over the years there were daily passenger flights from Mannheim City Airport (IATA code MHG) to London, Dresden, Berlin, Hamburg, Munich, and Saarbrücken. Currently, commercial passenger flights serve Sylt.

=== Local public transport ===
Local public transport in Mannheim includes the RheinNeckar S-Bahn, eleven tram lines, and numerous bus lines operated by Rhein-Neckar-Verkehr (Rhine-Neckar transport) (RNV).

The RheinNeckar S-Bahn, established in 2003, connects most of the Rhine-Neckar area, including lines into the Palatinate, Odenwald and southern Hesse. All S-Bahn lines run through Mannheim Hauptbahnhof except S5. Other S-Bahn stations are Mannheim-Rangierbahnhof, Mannheim-Seckenheim, and Mannheim-Friedrichsfeld-Süd.

The 1,000 mm (3 ft 3 3/8 in) metre gauge integrated Mannheim/Ludwigshafen tramway network also extends to Heidelberg. It is operated by RNV, a company that is owned by these three cities and some further municipalities in the Palatinate. RNV is the result of a merger on 1 October 2009 between the region's five former municipal transportation companies. Interurban trams are operated by RNV on a triangular route between Mannheim, Heidelberg, and Weinheim which was originally established by the Upper Rhine Railway Company (Oberrheinische Eisenbahn, OEG), and the company also operates interurban trams between Bad Dürkheim, Ludwigshafen, and Mannheim. In the 1970s a proposal to build a U-Bahn out of the Mannheim and Ludwigshafen tramways was begun, but only small sections were built due to lack of funds. The only underground station in Mannheim is the Haltestelle Dalbergstraße and U-Bahn planning has now ceased. All public transport is offered at uniform prices set by the Verkehrsverbund Rhein-Neckar (Rhine-Neckar Transport Union, VRN).

== Block numbering ==
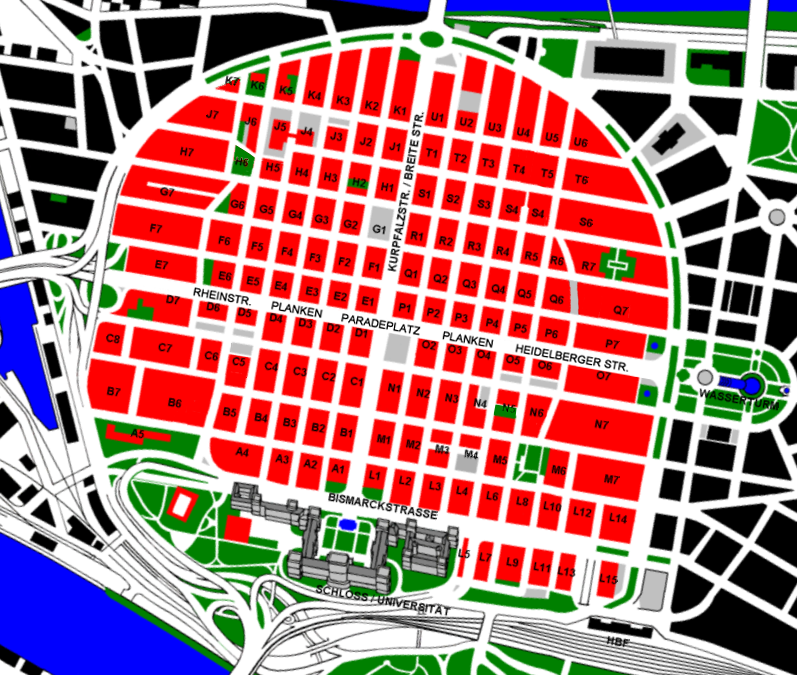
The squares with their numbers

The city centre uses an address system seen nowhere else in Germany. The grid system is given addresses based on letters and numbers rather than street names. The practice dates back centuries and is a result of the original use of the city centre as a fort, with the fort's internal system being retained when the streets became public.

The codes are laid out in a systematic pattern. The historical Breite Straße passes through the centre of the grid system from north to south and divides the centre into east and west. Rows A–K are found on the west side and L–U on the east, with letters progressing alphabetically going northwards. Intersecting roads divide rows into blocks numbered from 1 to 7 based on the distance from Breite Straße. Thus, C3 is between C2 and C4 when moving west and B3 and D3 when moving north. Further, a number is given to each building: C3, 17 is block C3, building 17. House numbers begin on the south corner nearest Breite Straße and go counterclockwise for A–K and clockwise for L–U.

This system causes major issues for most mapping software as each apparent street name references the four pieces of road encompassing a block. A variety of fixes have been tried, none with a high level of success. Attempts to fix the issue by giving the roads false names within the database have often failed to give accurate results, but such can still be seen on some platforms like Google Maps. Finding an address in the area thus generally requires resorting to asking directions or using one of the many posted public maps.

== Twin towns – sister cities ==
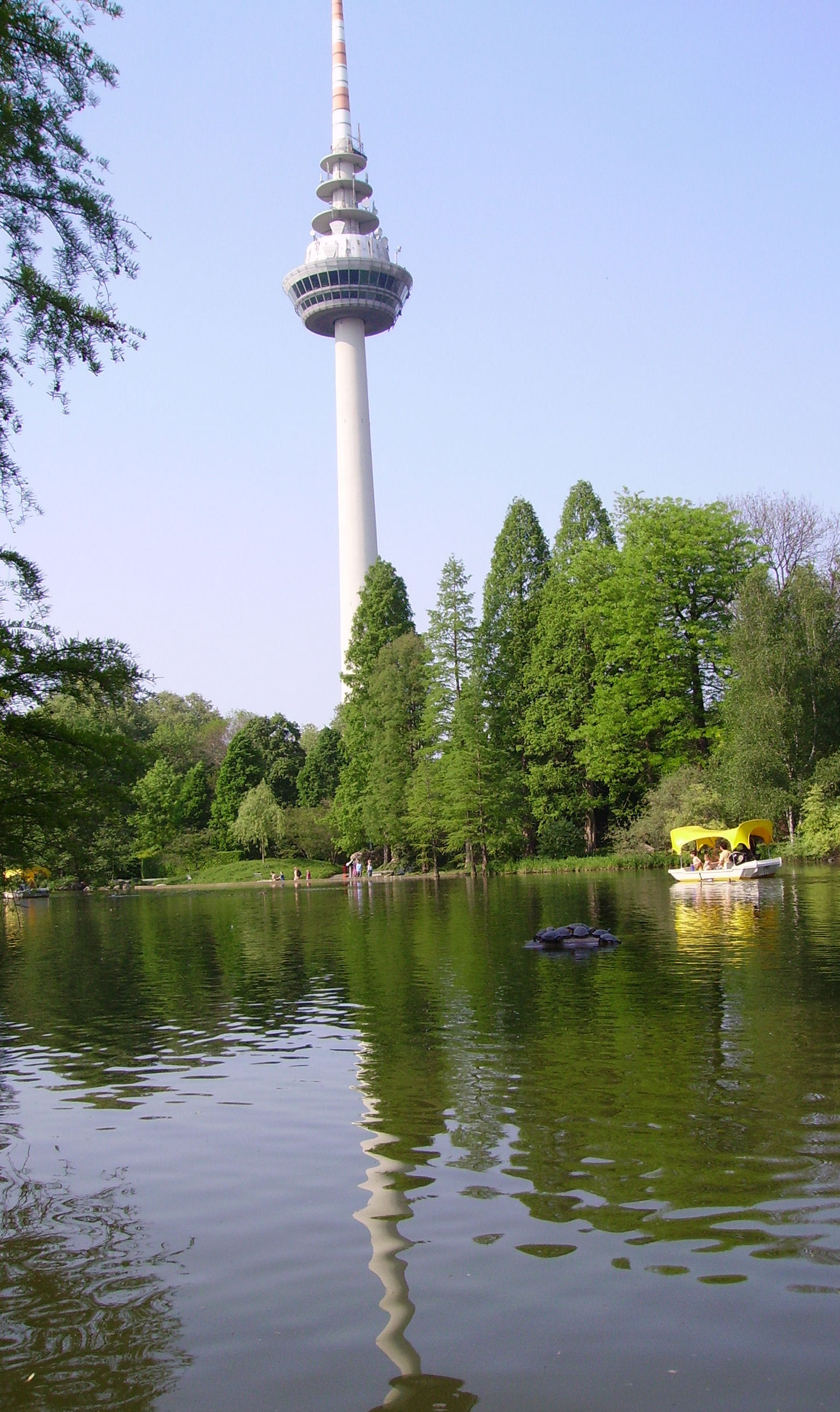
Telecommunication tower and Luisenpark

Mannheim is twinned with:

- Swansea, Wales, United Kingdom (1957)
- Toulon, France (1959)
- Charlottenburg-Wilmersdorf (Berlin), Germany (1961)
- Windsor, Canada (1980)
- Riesa, Germany (1988)
- Chișinău, Moldova (1989)
- Bydgoszcz, Poland (1991)
- Klaipėda, Lithuania (2002)
- Zhenjiang, China (2004)
- Haifa, Israel (2009)
- Qingdao, China (2016)
- Chernivtsi, Ukraine (2022)

== Notable people ==
- Francesco Cetti (1726–1778), Italian Jesuit priest, zoologist and mathematician
- Josepha von Heydeck (1748–1771), mistress of Charles Theodore, Elector of Bavaria
- Johann Baptist Cramer (1771–1858), English pianist and composer
- Friedrich Engelhorn (1821–1902), industrialist, founder of BASF
- Marcus Otterbourg (1827–1893), American diplomat, lawyer, and judge
- Richard von Krafft-Ebing (1840–1902), Austro-German psychiatrist
- Carl Benz (1844–1929), engine designer and automotive engineer. He built the first practical motorcar.
- Henry Morgenthau Sr. (1856–1946), American politician and real estate investor
- Robert Kahn (1865–1951), composer and pianist
- Otto Hermann Kahn (1867–1934), investment banker, collector and philanthropist
- Emmy Wehlen (1887–1977), musical comedy actress and silent screen star
- Sepp Herberger (1897–1977), football player and manager
- Wilhelm Fuchs (1898–1947), Nazi SS officer and Holocaust perpetrator executed for war crimes
- Hedwig Hillengaß (1902–1970), operatic soprano
- Albert Speer (1905–1981), Nazi architect, Minister for Armaments and Munitions during World War II
- Julius Hatry (1906–2000), aircraft designer and builder. He created the world's first purpose-built rocket plane.
- Hans Filbinger (1913–2007), politician
- Samuel Hans Adler (born 1928), German-American composer, conductor and professor
- Claus Leininger (1931–2005), theatre director and manager
- Wolf Wolfensberger (1934–2011), German-American psychologist
- Claus Wellenreuther (1935–2026), entrepreneur
- Roger Fritz (1936–2021), actor
- Rudi Altig (1937–2016), cyclist
- Christiane Schmidtmer (1939–2003), actress
- Fred Breinersdorfer (born 1946), writer
- Karl W Schweizer (born 1946), historian and author
- Kurt Fleckenstein (born 1949), artist/sculptor
- Peter Dani (1956–2002), American footballer
- Norbert Schwefel (1960–2015), musician
- Juergen Adams (born 1961), ice hockey player
- Uwe Rahn (born 1962), footballer
- Christine Lambrecht (born 1965), politician (SPD)
- Franz Jung (born 1966), Roman Catholic bishop
- Steffi Graf (born 1969), tennis player
- Xavier Naidoo (born 1971), pop singer
- Christian Wörns (born 1972), footballer
- Lexi Alexander (born 1974), director
- Bülent Ceylan (born 1976), German-Turkish comedian
- Jochen Hecht (born 1977), ice hockey player
- Uwe Gensheimer (born 1989), handball player
- Giulia Enders (born 1990), writer and medical researcher
- Pascal Groß (born 1991), footballer
- Hakan Çalhanoğlu (born 1994), Turkish footballer
- Paulina Krumbiegel (born 2000), footballer
- Leo Sauvage, journalist, writer, and arts critic.
- Alisa Datsenko (born 2010), rhythmic gymnast who represents Germany internationally
