= Schwefel (surname) =

Schwefel (German for sulfur) is a German surname. Notable people with the surname include:

- Hans-Paul Schwefel (born 1940), German computer scientist and professor emeritus at University of Dortmund
- Harald Schwefel, German physicist
- Norbert Schwefel (born 1960), German musician
