= Heidelberg University Faculty of Medicine in Mannheim =

Faculty at the University of Heidelberg

Coordinates: 49.4925701°N 8.4773404°E

The Faculty of Medicine in Mannheim is one of twelve faculties at the University of Heidelberg and is located at University Hospital Mannheim. It was founded in 1964 with a purely clinical focus but in 2006, the Medical Faculty Mannheim was transformed into a comprehensive medical faculty covering both pre-clinical and clinical training. It comprises 11 institutes.

The Faculty of Medicine in Mannheim has a particular research interest in medical technology. It thus works in close association with the Mannheim University of Applied Sciences. Major concerns are the development of optical measuring techniques, the simulation of operative and diagnostic procedures, the development of operation support systems, the advancement of minimally invasive surgical techniques, and software development.
