= Kapuzinerplanken =

Coordinates: 49.486°N 8.470°E

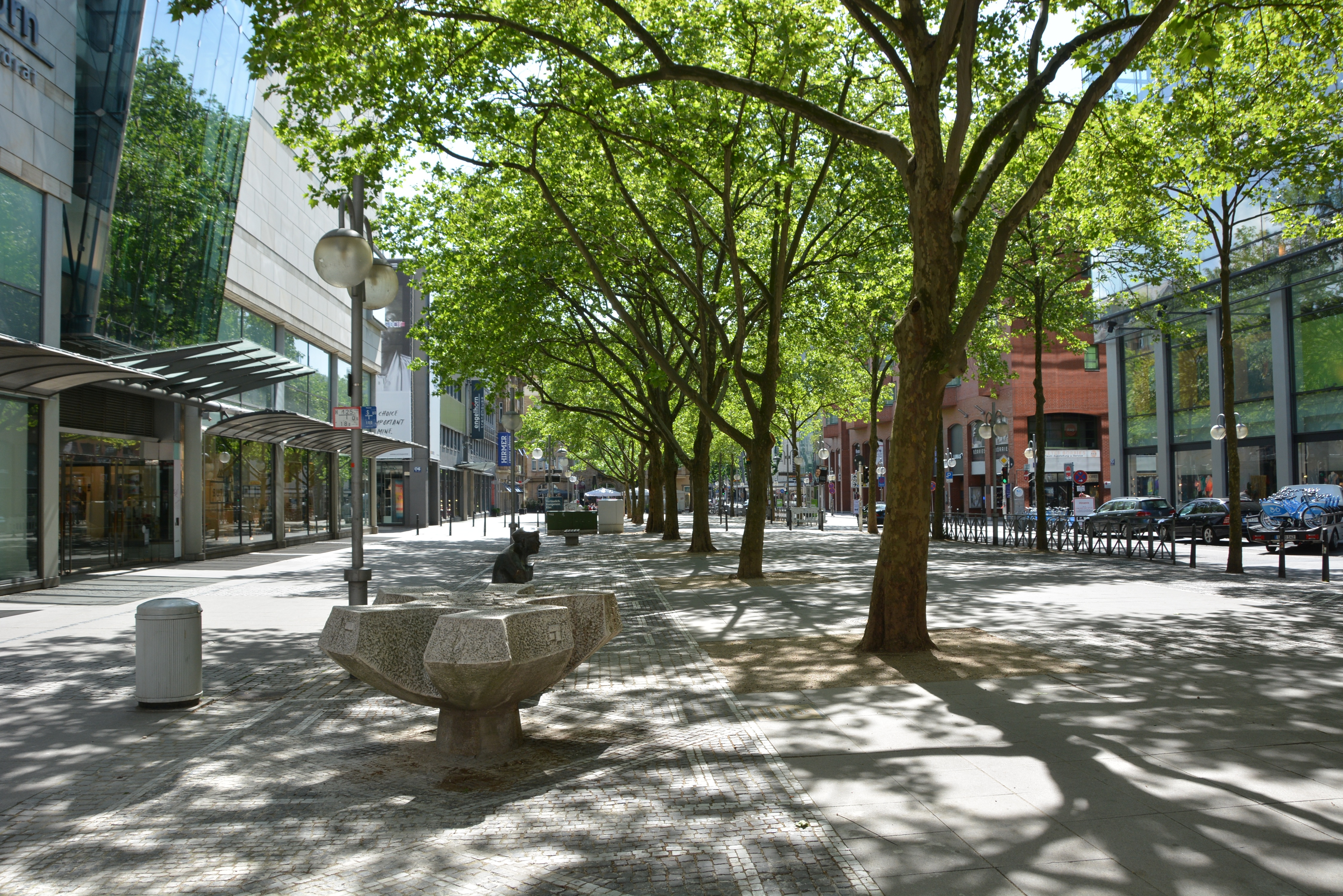

Kapuzinerplanken is a part of the street Kunststrasse in Mannheim, Germany. It is used only by pedestrians.

The Kapuzinerplanken runs parallel to the large planks, the part of the Mannheimer pedestrian precinct, which leads from the water tower to parade square.

From 1701 to 1839/40 there had been a monastery, a Kapuzinerkloster, on the road.
