= Alugha =

German video-hosting platform

- Company type: GmbH (Private company)
- Founded: 2014
- Headquarters: Mannheim, Germany
- Founders: Gregor Greinert, Bernd Korz, Niklas Korz, Ithamar Adema
- Key people: Bernd Korz (CEO/CVO), Gregor Greinert (CEO), Niklas Korz (CTO), Ithamar Adema (CTO)
- Services: Multilingual cloud-based video hosting platform
- Website: alugha.com
- Registration: Optional (Required to upload and to comment on videos)
- Launched: April 22, 2014
- Current status: Active

Alugha with headquarters in Mannheim, Germany is Germany's only open video portal and the first multilingual cloud-based video hosting platform on which online videos can be converted into multilingual formats.

== History ==
Alugha GmbH was founded in 2014 by the families of Bernd Korz and the chairman of the supervisory board of Duravit and shareholder of the Röchling Group, Gregor Greinert. The beginnings of Alugha (Arabic "A" and Swahili "lugha") go back to the year 2012. At that time, Korz had a YouTube channel on which he published tutorial videos on how to remodel a farmhouse and later videos on computer topics. As the demand for multilingual videos increased, Korz decided to use subtitles, as no video portal offered the option to change the language while watching the video. But this solution was not optimal and he came up with the idea to implement the option to change the language while the video is playing. Since the development of a prototype would have cost 800,000 euros, Korz's then 15-year-old son Niklas developed the prototype. In March 2015, Alugha released the first version of the platform.

== Features ==
Alugha enables the distribution of videos in multiple languages. In addition to allowing users to select different audio tracks, the platform offers AI-powered features for automatic transcription, translation, and dubbing of video content. Synthetic voices can be used to reproduce the translated audio versions. An integrated editor allows users to review and correct translations.

== Awards ==
- Innovation Hub Tata Communications, Winner 2020
