= Juergen Adams =

German ice hockey player

- Born: February 13, 1961 (age 64); Mannheim, West Germany
- Height: 5 ft 11 in (180 cm)
- Weight: 174 lb (79 kg; 12 st 6 lb)
- Position: Forward
- Played for: Mannheimer ERC; Eintracht Frankfurt
- NHL draft: Undrafted
- Playing career: 1980–1990

Juergen Adams (born February 13, 1961) is a retired German professional ice hockey player.

Adams began his career in the school and youth teams of the Mannheimer ERC. In 1980, he came as a student to the professional team and was immediately with this German Hockey champion under coach Heinz Weisenbach. After another seven seasons for the Mannheimer ERC, he spent two years with the Eintracht Frankfurt before he ended his career as a professional after a year at EC Bad Nauheim in the 2nd Bundesliga . During his professional career Adams scored a total of 161 points, including 81 goals, in 356 games.
