= Theaterakademie Mannheim =

German theater school

Coordinates: 49°29′54″N 8°28′34″E

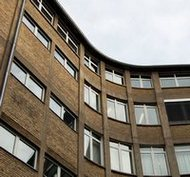
Premises of the school

Theaterakademie Mannheim is a state-recognized vocational school (staatlich anerkannte Berufsfachschule) for acting and directing located in Mannheim, Baden-Württemberg, Germany.

As a private vocational school, the academy does not receive state subsidies and is financed primarily through tuition fees and revenue from ticket sales.

Founded in 1994, it offers a three-and-a-half-year training program eligible for BAföG funding. The academy regularly produces public performances, such as adaptations of classic fairy tales.
