= Hedwig Hillengaß =

German operatic soprano (1902–1970)

- Born: 5 October 1902; Mannheim, German Empire
- Died: 21 May 1970 (aged 67); Mannheim, West Germany
- Occupation: Operatic soprano
- Organizations: Nationaltheater Mannheim; Badisches Staatstheater Karlsruhe; Krakow Opera
- Title: Kammersängerin

Hedwig Hillengaß (5 October 1902 – 22 May 1970) was a German operatic soprano, who appeared in leading roles, first operetta, later opera, in Germany. In May 1936, Bizet's Carmen was broadcast with her in the title role. Besides the standard repertoire, she performed in the world premiere of Egk's Peer Gynt, and the German premiere of Jakov Gotovac's Ero s onoga svijeta.

== Life ==
Hillengaß was born in Mannheim and grew up there. After her Mittlere Reife, she first worked at the Mannheim telegraph office. She studied singing in Mannheim with Jane Freund-Nauen.

She had her first stage engagement in the 1925/26 season at the Stadttheater Pforzheim where she was then engaged as a "beginner" with extra duties until 1927. From 1928 to 1931, she was engaged at the Stadttheater Heilbronn. Her roles with a focus on operetta included Sonja in Lèhar's Der Zarewitsch, Lisa in Das Land des Lächelns, the title role in Abraham's Viktoria und ihr Husar and Rosalinde in Die Fledermaus by Johann Strauss. From 1931 to 1933, she was engaged for operetta at the Stadttheater Plauen. She appeared in operettas such as Heuberger's Der Opernball, Benatzky's Im weißen Rößl, the title role of Offenbach's La belle Hélène, as Angèle Didier in Léhar's Der Graf von Luxemburg, Fiametta in Suppè's Boccaccio, and Saffi in Der Zigeunerbaron by J. Strauss.

Fraom 1933, Hillengaß was 1st operetta singer at the Nationaltheater Mannheim, where she appeared in opera for the first time the following year. She remained with the theatre until 1935. Her roles there included Saffi, Julia de Weert in Der Vetter aus Dingsda, and operatic roles such as the title role in Schilling's Mona Lisa and Minnie in Puccini's Das Mädchen aus dem goldenen Westen.

In 1935, she moved on to the Badisches Staatstheater Karlsruhe as a spinto soprano, with roles including Baroness Freimann in Lortzing's Der Wildschütz, Ninabella in Egk's Die Zaubergeige, Pamina in Mozart's Die Zauberflöte, and the title roles in Smetana's Die verkaufte Braut and Bizet's Carmen. She also played more operetta roles such as Kurfürstin Marie in Der Vogelhändler and Komtesse Laura in Der Bettelstudent. In May 1936, Bizet's Carmen was broadcast on Reichssender Stuttgart with her in the title role. In 1937, Hillengaß was appointed Kammersängerin. In 1938, she sang the role of Djula in the German premiere of Jakov Gotovac's Ero s onoga svijeta (Ero der Schelm).

While still in Karlsruhe, she was engaged for the world premiere of Egk's Peer Gynt as Die Rothaarige at the Opernhaus Düsseldorf, alongside Josef Greindl, leading to her engagement there for the following two seasons. She appeared there as Freia in Wagner's Das Rheingold, in Mussorgsky's Boris Godunov, as Pamina, as Venus in Wagner's Tannhäuser, in the title role of Puccini's Manon Lescaut, as Countess Almaviva in Mozart's Die Hochzeit des Figaro and in Don Giovanni, and in the title role of Janacek's Jenůfa.

She then moved to the Krakow Opera, then in the Reichsgouvernement of Poland, where she remained until the closure of all opera houses after the 1943/44 season due to World War II.

In 1946, she was engaged at the Theater Heidelberg in 1946, where she was 1st soprano until the 1952/53 season. She also appeared as a guest at the Karlsruhe State Theatre, worked with the broadcaster Süddeutscher Rundfunk, and appeared at the Schwetzingen Festival.

Her operatic roles also included Ramiro in Mozart's La finta giardiniera, Senta in Wagner's Der fliegende Holländer, both Octavian and Marschallin in Der Rosenkavalier by Richard Strauss, the title role in Verdi's Aida, Desdemona in Otello, the title role in Puccini's Tosca and Dolly in Sly.

Hillengaß died from an accident in Mannheim at age 68.
