= Mannheim University of Applied Sciences =

Public higher education institute in Germany

- Technische Hochschule Mannheim
- Type: Public University of Applied Sciences
- Established: 1898
- Budget: EUR 39.8 million
- Rector: Prof. Dr. Angelika Altmann-Dieses
- Academic staff: 368
- Administrative staff: 119
- Students: 5,300
- Location: Mannheim, Baden-Württemberg, Germany; 49°28′10.40″N 8°28′55.95″E
- Campus: Urban
- Website: http://www.hs-mannheim.de/

The Mannheim University of Applied Sciences is a public higher education institute located in Mannheim, Germany. Referred to as Technische Hochschule Mannheim in German and previously known as Fachhochschule Mannheim, it offers degree programs at bachelor's and master's level in the fields of engineering, informatics, biotechnology, design, and social affairs.

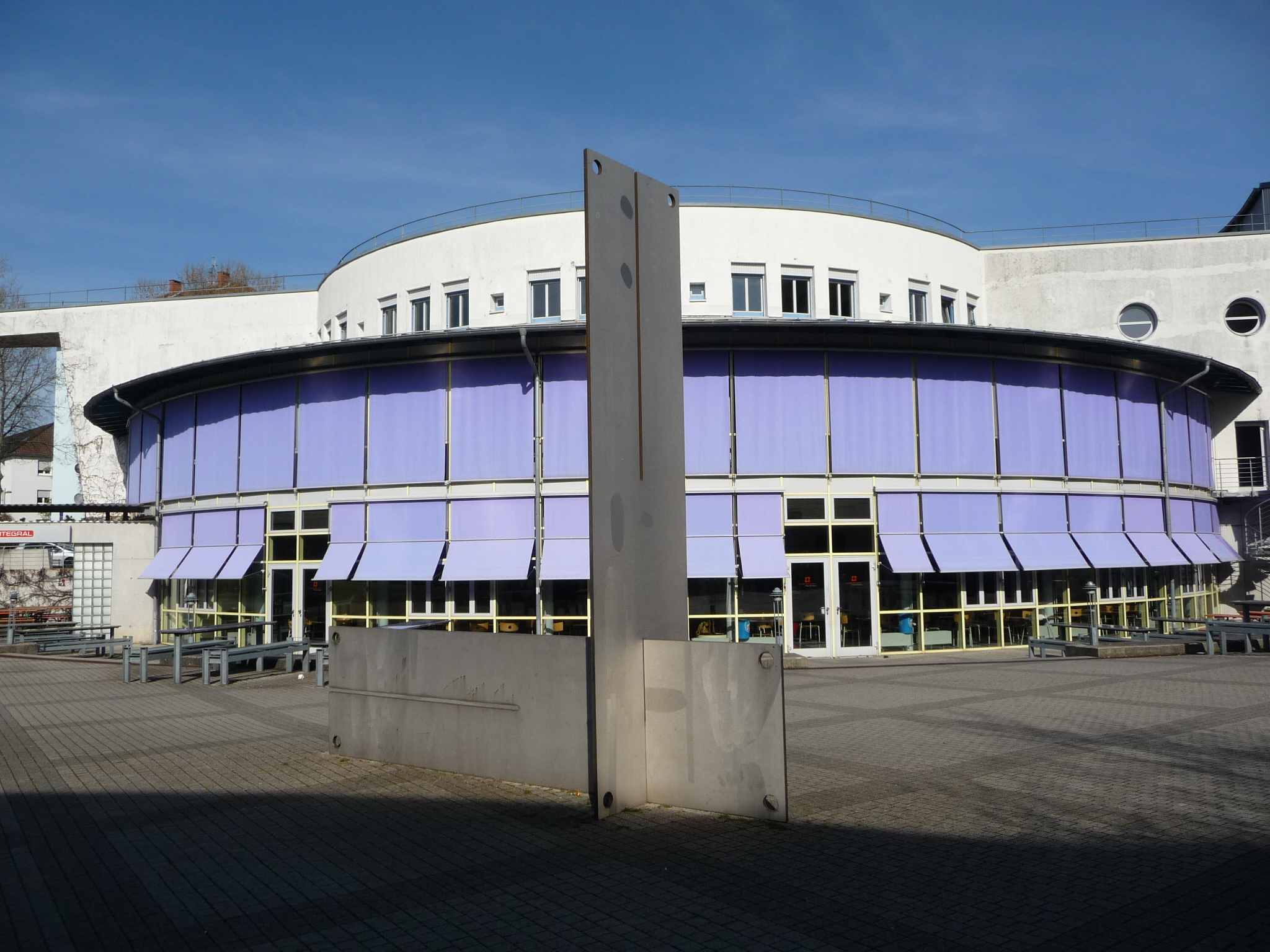
Cafeteria of Technical University of Applied Sciences Mannheim

== History ==
The Mannheim University of Applied Sciences was founded in 1898 as a private school of engineering for the disciplines of mechanical and electrical engineering, subsidized by the city of Mannheim. In 1939, it was taken over by the city and named Mannheim School of Engineering. In 1969 finally, it was taken over again by the State of Baden-Württemberg and renamed State School of Engineering. As a consequence, the curriculum was broadened by adding, among others, the subjects chemical engineering, process engineering, and informatics. In 1971, the School of Engineering was officially promoted to the status of a University of Applied Sciences.

In 1995, the City College of Design was integrated into the university as the Faculty of Design, comprising institutes for interactive media, print media, time based media, photography, and design sciences. When the Mannheim School of Social Affairs joined the university in a merger in 2006, the university was renamed to Hochschule Mannheim. The university was one of the first German universities of applied sciences offering a degree program in biotechnology.

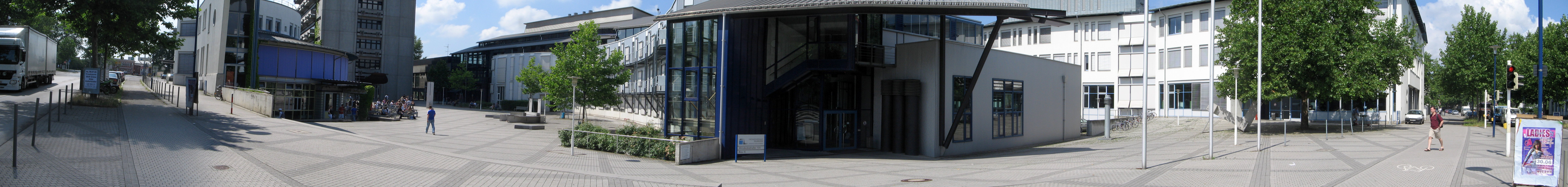
Panorama picture of the Campus in July 2006

== Faculties ==
The university has the following faculties:

- Faculty of Biotechnology
- Faculty of Electronic Engineering
- Faculty of Design
- Faculty of Informatics
- Faculty of Information Technology
- Faculty of Mechanical Engineering
- Faculty of Process Engineering and Chemical Engineering
- Faculty of Engineering Management
- Faculty of Social Affairs

== See also ==
- List of universities in Germany
- Rhine Neckar Metropolitan Area
