= University Hospital Mannheim =

Geography
- Location: Mannheim, Germany
- Coordinates: 49°29′31″N 8°29′17″E

Organisation
- Type: Teaching
- Affiliated university: Universität Heidelberg

Services
- Beds: 1,352 (2021)

History
- Opened: 1701

Links
- Website: www.umm.de

University Hospital Mannheim is a maximum care hospital with many specialisations. It currently consists of 21 specialised clinics, all situated on a historic campus in the centre of Mannheim and focuses on interdisciplinary and interprofessional cooperation of its physicians in the treatment of its patients.

Unlike most German university hospitals, the University Hospital Mannheim is not owned by the state but by the municipality of Mannheim. The Mannheim medical faculty is part of the renowned Heidelberg University.

== Patient care ==
Around 230,000 patients per year are treated at the University Hospital Mannheim. In addition to general university-level maximum care, it offers highly specialized services in cancer treatment (e.g. allogene stem cell transplant, radiation therapy with Gamma Knife, extremity perfusion), fetal surgery, neurology and neurosurgery as well as urology. The hospital has a nationally renowned children's centre with highly specialized units for fetal surgery, neonatology, paediatric medicine, paediatric surgery, as well as paediatric urology.

Specialized centres of the hospital deal with the interdisciplinary treatment of diseases, including, for example, the Mannheim Cancer Centre (MCC), the Interdisciplinary Centre for Vascular Anomalies, the Transplant Centre Mannheim, the University Vascular Centre Mannheim, the German Centre for Foetal Surgery and Minimally Invasive Therapy, and the Centre for Metastasis and Tumour Recurrence Surgery. The paediatric section is renowned for the treatment of CDH (congenital diaphragmatic hernia): Patients with CDH come from all over Germany, German speaking and further European countries for treatment to Mannheim. National and international rankings place the University Hospital Mannheim among the best hospitals in Germany.

== History ==
The history of the University Medical Centre Mannheim dates back to 1701, when an almshouse was founded in Mannheim that cared for poor, foreign or sick people. As from 1806, the municipality operated a small hospital in block R 5 in the city center. Unlike the almshouse, it earned the title of "hospital". Documentation exists on an inventory of around 330 beds dating from 1860. By this time, the institution had wards for internal medicine, surgery, childbirth, babies, scabies and sexually transmitted diseases.

Patient numbers increased continually. Therefore, in 1913, building work began on a new site for the hospital – right on the banks of the river Neckar. The planners modelled the layout on baroque palace grounds. The new buildings started operation in 1924 after construction work was heavily delayed during World War I. Over the course of the years, more modern extensions were added.

Following the rising student numbers in medical science in the 1960s, a decision was made to involve municipal hospitals in the training of medical students. As a result, Mannheim Medical Faculty of Heidelberg University was founded in 1964 with a purely clinical focus. In 2001, the municipal hospital Mannheim was officially and legally awarded with the title University Hospital Mannheim. In 2006, Mannheim Medical Faculty was transformed into a comprehensive medical faculty covering both pre-clinical and clinical training.

== University Hospital Clinics ==
All of the University Hospital Clinics are located on the central historic campus in the centre of Mannheim on the banks of the River Neckar. In total, there are 21 University Hospital Clinics:

- I. Medical Clinic (Cardiology, Angiology, Pneumology)
- II. Medical Clinic (Gastroenterology, Hepatology, Infectiology, Nutritional Medicine)
- III. Medical Clinic (Haematology and Internal Oncology)
- IV. Medical Clinic (Geriatrics)
- V. Medical Clinic (Nephrology, Hypertensiology, Endocrinology, Diabetology, Rheumatology)
- Department of Neuroradiology
- Eye Clinic (Ophtalmology)
- Gynaecological Clinic
- Paediatric Surgery Clinic
- Clinic for Anaesthesiology and Surgical Intensive Care Medicine
- Clinic for Dermatology, Venereology, and Allergology
- Clinic for Otorhinolaryngology, Head and Neck Surgery
- Clinic for Paediatrics and Adolescent Medicine
- Clinic for Neonatology
- Clinic for Radiology and Nuclear Medicine
- Clinic for Radiotherapy and Radiation Oncology
- Clinic for Urology and Uro-Surgery
- Clinic for Visceral, Vascular, and Thoracic Surgery
- Neurosurgical Clinic
- Neurological Clinic
- Orthopaedic Trauma Surgery Centre

Other medical facilities:

- Interdisciplinary Tumour Centre Mannheim (ITM)
- Short-Term Therapy Centre
- LASIK Centre Mannheim
- German Centre for Foetal Surgery & Minimally Invasive Therapy

== Areas of research ==
Research at the University Hospital Mannheim focuses mainly on four areas:

- Oncology: interdisciplinary cooperation via the Interdisciplinary Tumour Centre Mannheim
- Translational Neurosciences: brain tumors, psychiatric disorders, chronic pain, stroke, epileptic seizures, Parkinson's disease and multiple sclerosis
- Vascular Biology and Medicine: Focus on structural and functional analysis of the vessel walls
- Medical technology: application-oriented research in imaging and image analysis

== Notable researchers and physicians affiliated with the University Medical Centre Mannheim ==
- Franz Volhard (1872–1950), internist, is considered one of the founders of modern nephrology
- Ernst Josef Lesser, physiologist, is regarded as one of the discoverers of the blood sugar hormone insulin
- Thomas Kohl, foetal surgeon, professor of medicine at Medical Faculty Mannheim of Heidelberg University, is considered a pioneer of minimally invasive foetal surgery and developer of numerous minimally invasive surgical procedures, e.g., for the treatment of spina bifida or diaphragmatic hernias in foetuses in the womb
- Michael Platten, neurologist, neuroimmunologist, and brain tumour immunologist, professor of medicine at Medical Faculty Mannheim of Heidelberg University, awarded the German Cancer Prize 2019
- Nicole Rotter, Ear, Nose and Throat Surgeon, Professor of Medicine at Medical Faculty Mannheim of Heidelberg University, researches cartilage and salivary gland tissue regeneration and robot-assisted (onco) surgery, member of the National Academy of Sciences Leopoldina

== Medical training ==
The Mannheim Medical Faculty, which has been a part of the hospital since 1969, is a branch of the University of Heidelberg.

Mannheim Medical Faculty offers an innovative curriculum for medical students from year one – known as MareCuM – with an interdisciplinary and integrative approach to teaching. MareCuM has proved successful right from the start: Its students regularly achieve high scores in M1 (the first stage of the nationwide state examination for medicine), ranking on top positions among the 34 medical faculties in Germany every year.

== Trivia ==
The original blueprints of Mannheim University Hospital served as plans for a model of Reading Hospital, Reading, Pennsylvania.

== See also ==
- List of university hospitals
- Heidelberg University
