= Schwefel =

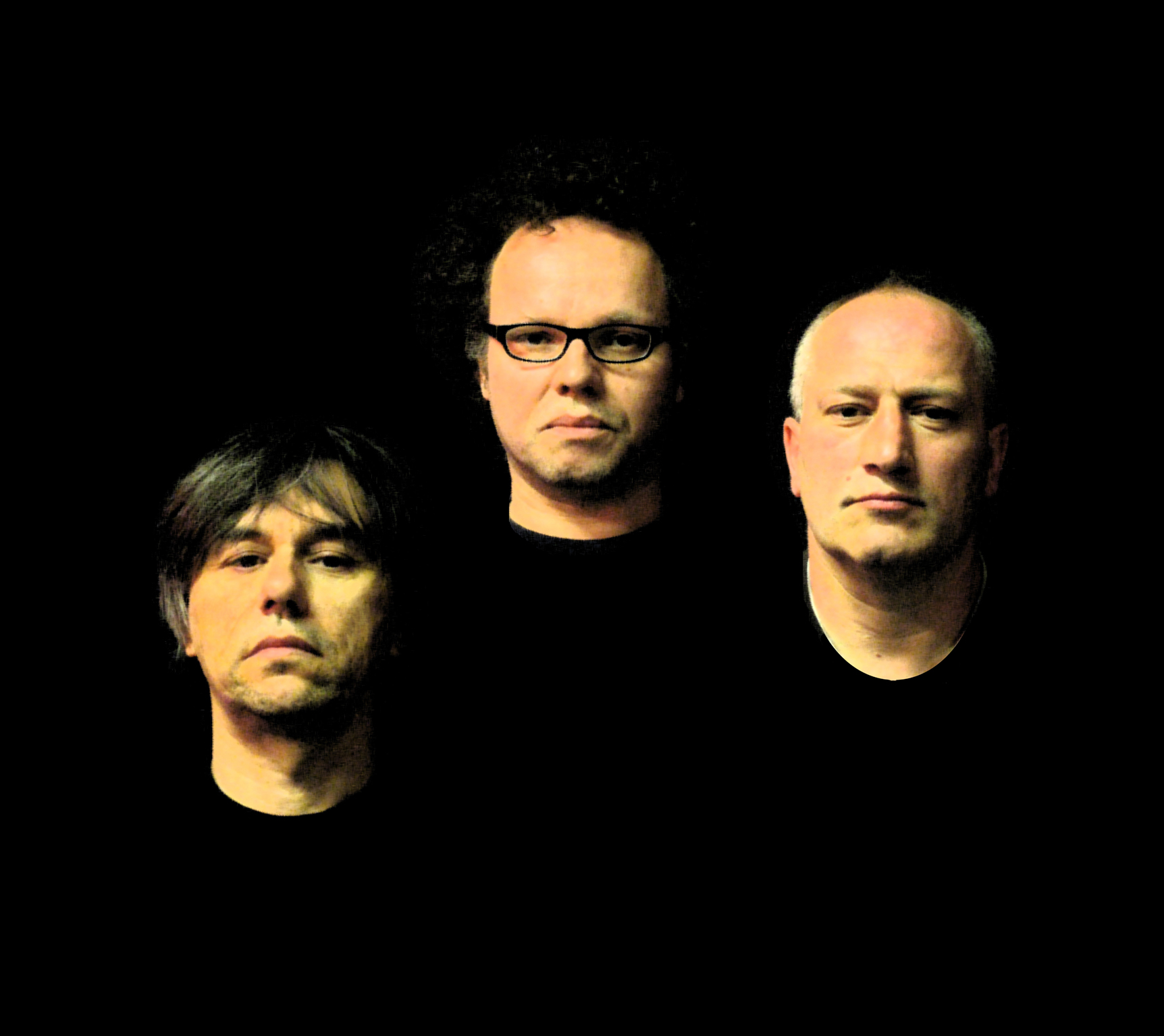
(2008 line-up), from left to right: Norbert Schwefel, Thomas Hinkel, Thomas Nelliste

Schwefel was a German independent band, founded in 1984 by Norbert Schwefel (22 August 1960 – 23 July 2015).

== History ==
In 1984, musician and producer Norbert Schwefel started recording tapes and records, in the beginning all by himself, later in collaboration with several musicians. Schwefel were commended by the press and many fanzines in the early 1980s and often described as the forthcoming stars of the independent scene. Since they did not reach any big commercial success, the band stopped releasing albums from 1992 to 1999. Then the career was continued by a compilation album and a number of new releases.

== Musical style ==
Schwefel were an indie rock group mainly influenced by glam rock, electronic body music and psychedelic rock.

== Discography ==
- Strange Orchestras (1984; MC)
- Second (1985; MC)
- The Dancing Partner (1985; MC; Amigo)
- Nervous Tract (1985; MC)
- Schizophrenic Party (1986; Mini-LP; Schuldige Scheitel Records)
- Metropolis (1987; EP; Amigo)
- Detailed (1988; MC; Amigo)
- Champagne, Champagne and the Golden Rain (1988; EP, Amigo)
- Hot in Hongkong (1988; LP, CD; Amigo)
- Luna Messalina (1990; LP, CD; Vielklang)
- All Shook Up (1990; EP; Vielklang)
- Psycho IV (1991; Video; Vielklang)
- Motor Psycho (1992; LP, CD; Vielklang)
- Photosynthese (1999; CD; Sulphur Sonic Records)
- Unlimited Years (1999; CD; Sulphur Sonic Records; Compilation of the period 1984–1992)
- Center Of Love (2001; Maxi CD; Sulphur Sonic Records)
- Edge City (2001; CD; Apollyon/EFA)
- Mystifier (2003; CD; Sulphur Sonic Records)
- What’s Your Blow (2008; CD; Parergon; Compilation of the period 1987–1992)
- Weinheim Tea Party (2008; CD; Parergon)
- Best (2016; CD; Sulphur Sonic Records)
