= St. Sebastian (Mannheim) =

Catholic Church in Mannheim, Germany

Coordinates: 49°29′21″N 8°28′00″E

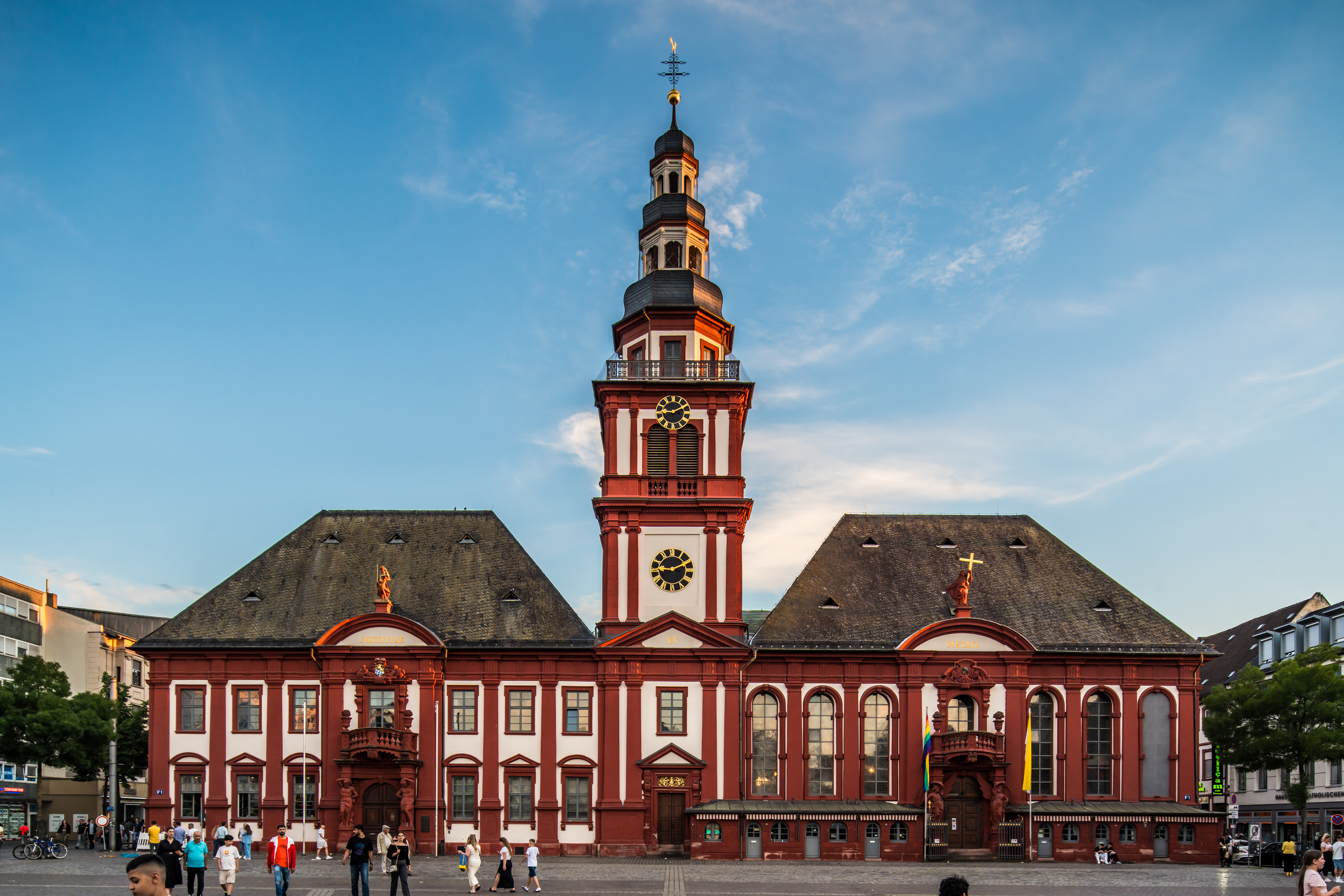
Old City Hall and St. Sebastian

St. Sebastian is the oldest Catholic parish church in the city of Mannheim and one of the three churches of the Mannheim city pastoral unit in the city center. In Electoral Palatine times it was used by the Elector as a court church and received a magnificent interior by artists such as Bibiena, Verschaffelt and Egell. The furnishings were impaired by remodeling in the 19th century and damaged during World War II. Together with the Old Town Hall, St. Sebastian's Church forms a Baroque double building erected at the beginning of the 18th century, which is the oldest preserved structure in the city.

== History ==
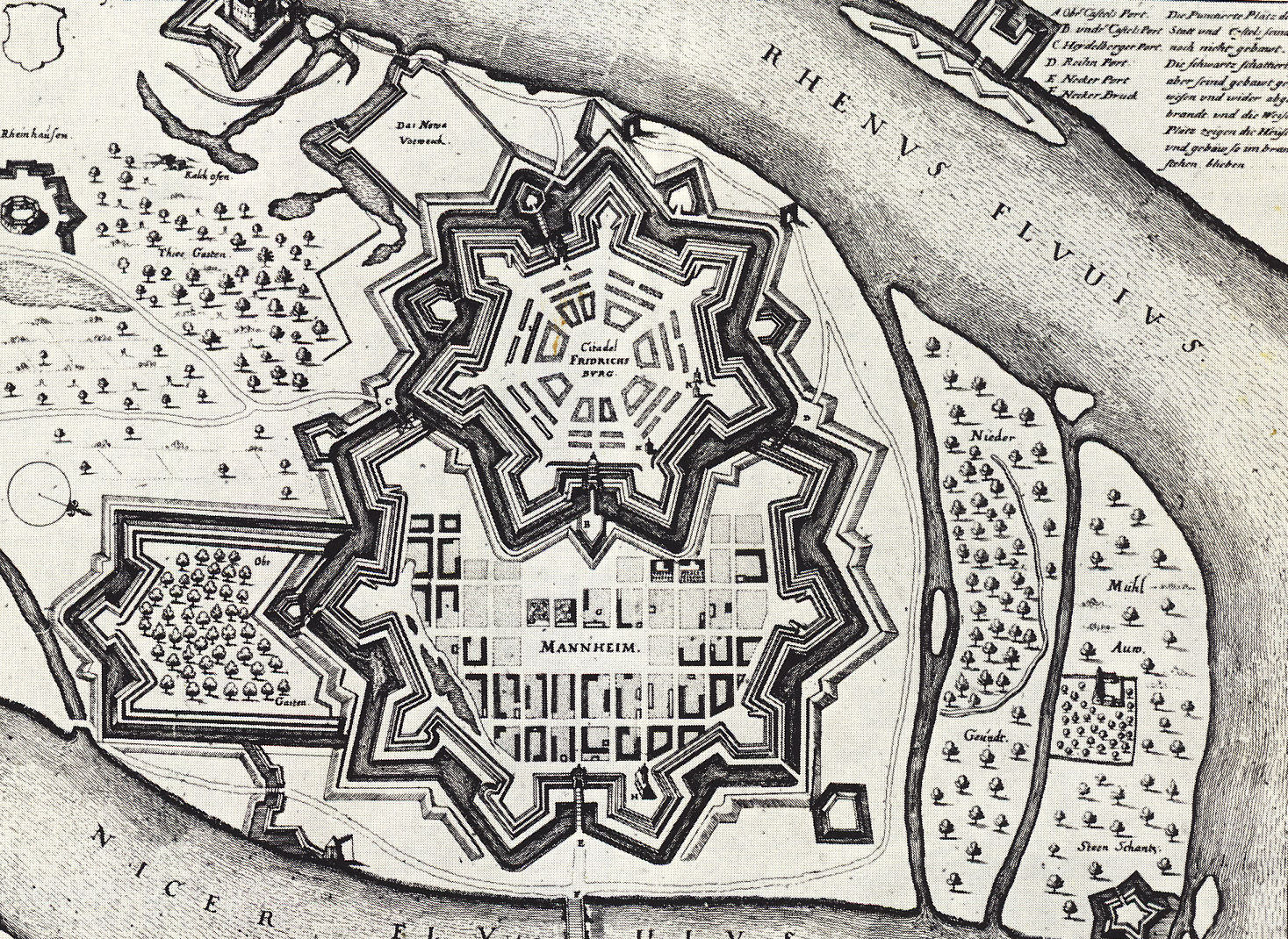
Mannheim in the 17th century, above the Friedrichsburg, below the "new" Mannheim (Matthäus Merian 1645)

=== First church in Mannheim ===
Mannheim was first mentioned in the Lorsch Codex in 766. Since when there was a church in Mannheim is not known, a parish priest was first attested in 1309. In the Worms synodale of 1496, a visitation protocol of the parishes of the Worms diocese, the Mannheim parish church was described and it was recorded for the first time that St. Sebastian was the patron of the church and village. In 1556, Elector Ottheinrich introduced the Reformation in the Electoral Palatinate.

Nothing is known about the further fate of the old St. Sebastian's Church. However, it was probably demolished at the beginning of the 17th century, when Friedrichsburg Castle was built in place of the old village as a bulwark to protect the Protestant Electoral Palatinate and the Mannheim villagers had to move north of it to what is now the lower town of the squares. With the exception of a few years during the Thirty Years' War, Mannheim subsequently remained Protestant. The few Catholics were forbidden to practice the freedom of religion in public, so services were secretly attended in Seckenheim's St. Aegidius Church.

=== New construction of the church ===
In 1685, a Catholic branch of the Wittelsbach dynasty took over the Electoral Palatinate inheritance under Philipp Wilhelm, who decreed that the Catholics could share the use of the Reformed and Lutheran churches, and in 1701 Mannheim once again received its own Catholic parish. After the destruction of the Nine Years' War, however, only a simultaneum used emergency church and, from 1704, also the church of the Capuchin Abbey were available. In the meantime, the foundation stone for a town hall on the central Marktplatz had been laid in 1700 in the town of square F 1, on the west wing of which the municipality planned a weighing house with representation rooms on the upper floor. The Catholics, with the support of the city director, proposed that the main Catholic church be built on this site instead. Elector Johann Wilhelm approved the proposal in 1706 and the foundation stone was laid that same year on November 25. Auxiliary Bishop Peter Cornelius Beyweg consecrated it in honor of the Holy Trinity and the Beata Maria Virgo Assumpta (Assumption of Mary). The plans met with resistance from the representatives of the majority Protestant town, partly because they were to pay for most of the costs and the building was to be symmetrically based on the representative style of the town hall. Instead, they proposed to build the church in square N 1 near the Paradeplatz. This, in turn, was rejected by the Catholics because the building site was too poor and the regular cattle market was held there, so that in 1707 the Elector ordered the church to be built on the Marktplatz.

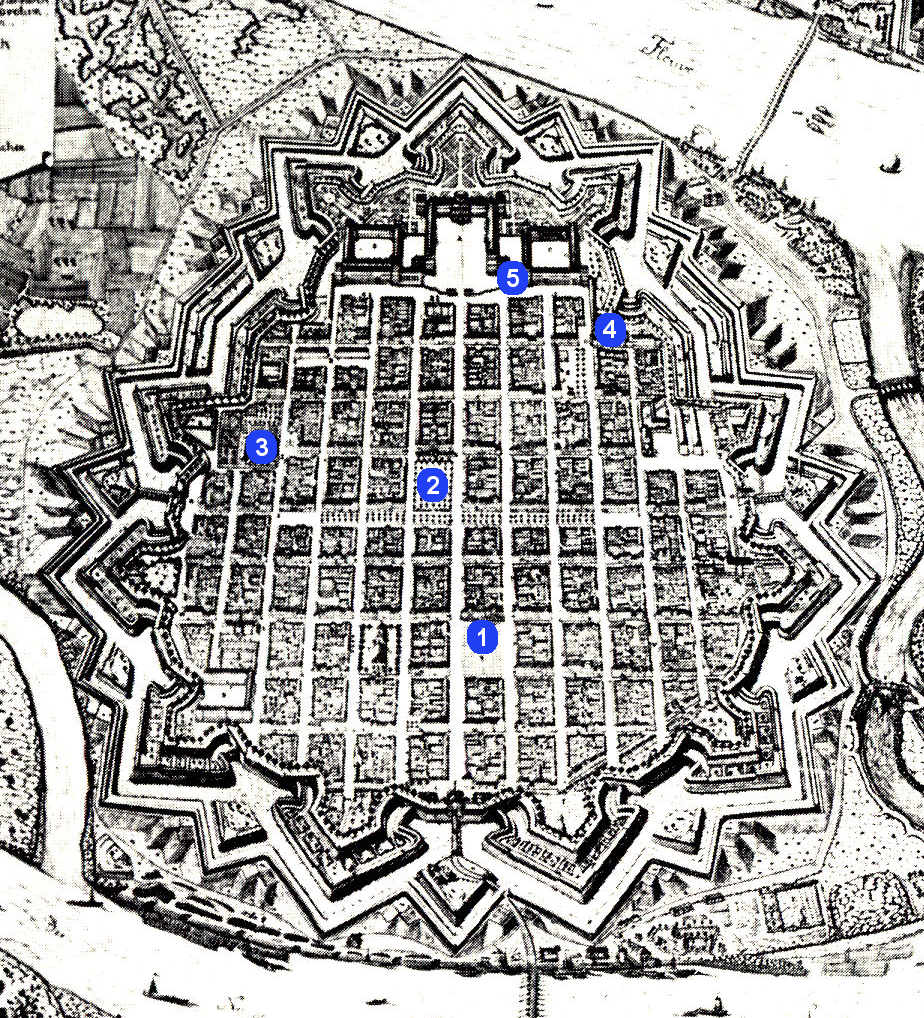
Mannheim 1758 (Josef Anton Baertels) 1. St. Sebastian 2. Paradeplatz 3. Capuchin Abbey 4. Jesuit Church 5. Schlosskirche

According to the plans of the Vorarlberg master builder Johann Jakob Rischer (1662-1755), the church was built under the direction of the engineers William Cour and Johann W. Nottum. Contrary to Rischer's original plan, the Elector ordered all parts of the building to be raised 10 feet, round-arched windows for the church, and that no dome be placed over the church. Instead, the church was given a high hipped roof, as was the town hall before it. It was consecrated on 12 December 1709, and probably consecrated episcopally on 1 May 1710. By tradition, Sebastian was adopted as the patron saint for the town church. After that, construction on the church continued until 1723, especially on the facade decoration and interior decoration.

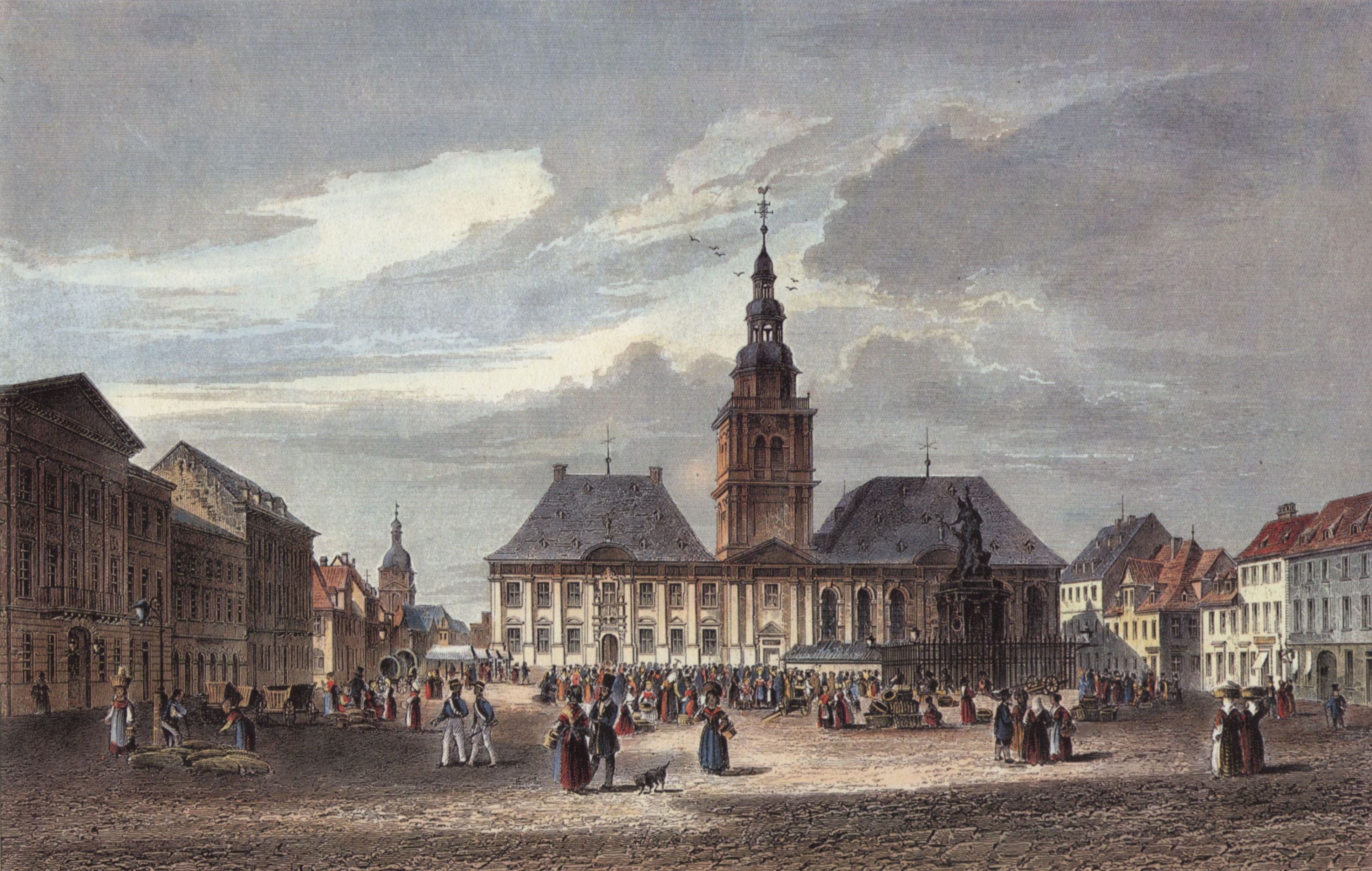
View around 1840 (Joseph Maximilian Kolb)

In 1720, Elector Carl Philipp moved the residence of the Electoral Palatinate from Heidelberg to Mannheim and used St. Sebastian's as the court church until the construction of the Mannheim Palace Church in 1731. Even after that, the Elector regularly attended services in the church once a year on January 20 - the feast of St. Sebastian. As early as 1742, the church had to be renovated under the direction of Alessandro Galli da Bibiena. The church on the Marktplatz was soon too small for the growing number of Catholics. As early as 1744, the need for a second parish was established, but it was not built due to lack of money. In 1804, the new sovereign Charles Frederick von Baden ordered the transfer of the parish to the Jesuit church, because it was larger and in better condition. It was not until December 1824 that a separate parish was again established at St. Sebastian. Since then, the names Upper (Jesuit Church) and Lower Parish (St. Sebastian) became common.

=== After 1827 ===
Within the Catholic Church, after the dissolution of the Diocese of Worms, St. Sebastian belonged to the Heidelberg Deanery in the Archdiocese of Freiburg from 1827 until the Mannheim City Deanery was founded in 1902. Due to the population explosion at the end of the 19th century in Mannheim - the city's population increased from 39,606 to 141,147 between 1871 and 1900 - more churches were built and parishes were founded and separated from the two original parishes, such as the Liebfrauenkirche and the Heilig-Geist-Kirche in 1903, the Herz-Jesu-Kirche in 1904 and St. Josef in 1907.

The interior of the church underwent some drastic changes during this period. First, in 1875, the high altar in the rococo style was demolished and replaced by a historicist ciboria altar. In addition, the antependium went on loan to Berlin in 1934. The remains of the high altar, the chancel barrier and four figures preserved after the destruction of the Second World War are now exhibited in the Bode Museum.

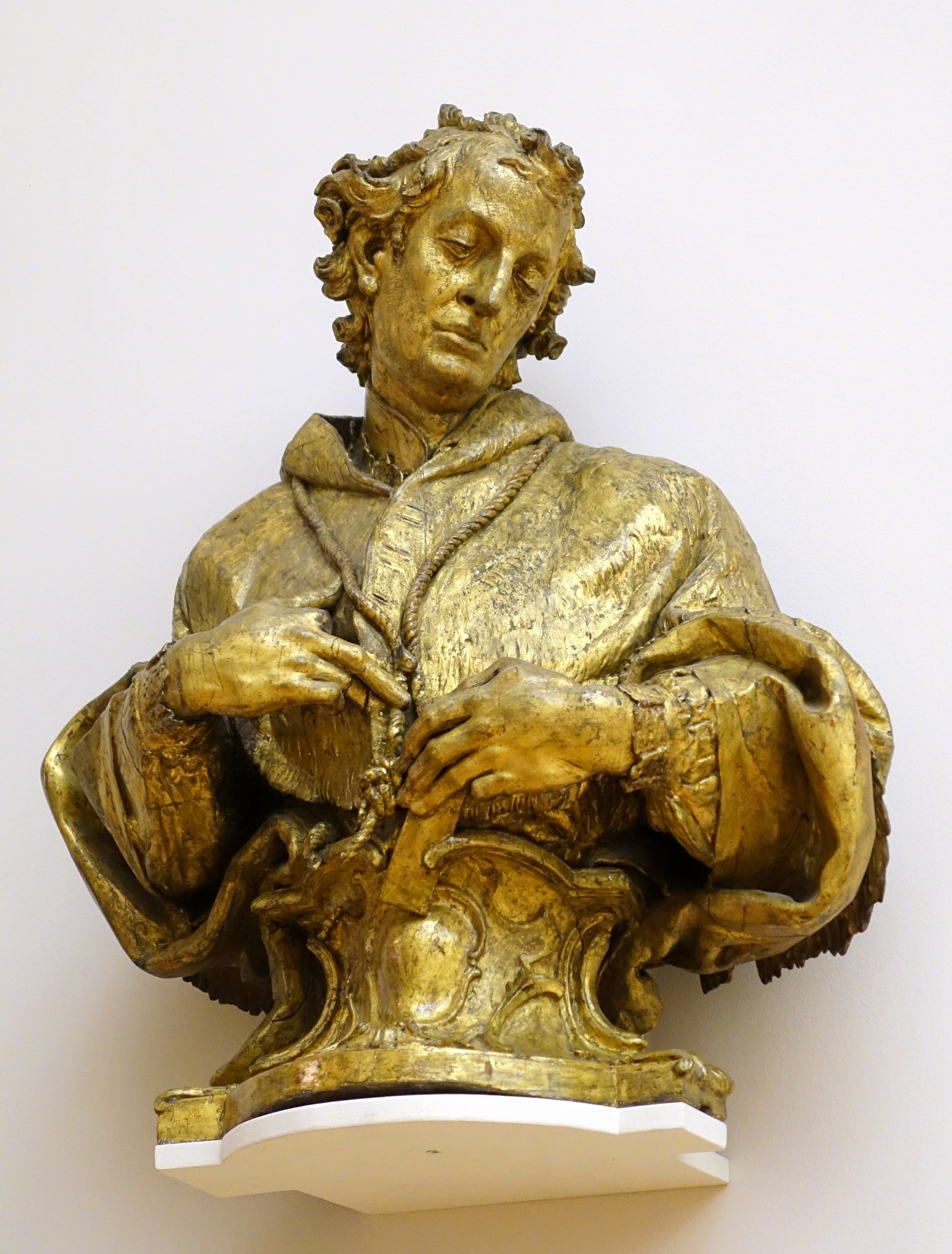
Bode Museum, figure of the former high altar

During the renovation in 1906/07, among other things, the apse was painted and windows in the choir were bricked up. In 1936 the church was restored. Previously, Joseph Sauer had drawn up an expert report in which he criticized the church for being "unspeakably disfigured in terms of color and embarrassingly overgrown by a magazine-like accumulation of products of artistic unculture". The 1906 stuccowork and two "pseudo altars" were removed and, as far as could be determined, the original color scheme was restored.

During World War II, more than three quarters of the buildings in Mannheim were destroyed. St. Sebastian's Church, on the other hand, suffered comparatively little destruction. In a bombing raid in April 1943, the Marktplatz facade, the roof and parts of the interior were damaged. Afterwards, an emergency church was set up under the organ loft. After the war, the whole church - provided with an emergency roof - could be used again already at the end of 1945. Between 1952 and 1954, St. Sebastian's was extensively renovated and some of the lost furnishings were replaced. The new high altar was consecrated on 28 March 1954. In 1973 and 1999, the church was renovated.

Due to the migration of the population from the inner city and the dwindling number of faithful, a consolidation was initiated towards the end of the 20th century. The three inner-city parishes of the Upper and Lower Parishes and the Liebfrauenkirche were combined into a pastoral unit on 1 September 2005. Since 2003, the Mannheim Evangelization Team has celebrated its services in St. Sebastian's, and since 2009, the Catholic university community has done so as well. The parish used the jubilee year 2007 - the city celebrated the 400th anniversary of the granting of city rights - to revive an old tradition. Since then, it again celebrates the Sebastianus festival on January 20, the anniversary of the death of the church and former village patron. In 2009, in view of the 98th German Catholic Day, which took place in Mannheim in 2012, it was decided to renovate the exterior of the church.

== Description ==
=== Exterior design ===
The church, together with the Old Town Hall, forms the dominant southern edge of the Marktplatz. On the other edges of the square stood old houses until the Second World War, both two-story buildings from the Baroque period, as well as three- and four-story buildings in the style of classicism and historicism, because especially in the 19th century the houses on the Marktplatz were a preferred residential area of the upper middle class. During the war, almost all the buildings were destroyed and then replaced by residential and commercial buildings in the functional style of the time, creating a strong contrast with the Baroque double building of the town hall and the church, as well as the Marktplatzbrunnen, which was built in 1767.

The exterior appearance of the building, which is characterized by the striking interplay between lightly plastered surfaces and red sandstone, is typical of buildings from the Baroque period in Mannheim. The ensemble of town hall, bell tower and church follows the Mannheim architectural scheme of public buildings with almost symmetrical components and the tower in the center. The connection between the secular power of order and religion is made clear by the inscription in large golden letters that runs across the gables of the three parts of the building: "Iustitiae et Pietati" (Justice and Piety). The facades are crowned by corresponding female figures symbolizing the two virtues. The bell tower terminates in a multi-stepped helmet. The symmetry is reinforced by the portals to both buildings. The portal of the town hall is decorated with atlases, that of the church with angels. The balcony above the church portal is only ornamental and cannot be entered.

The Marktplatz facade of the church is divided into seven axes. Between the six large, round-arched windows are pilasters supporting a triglyph frieze. The base is concealed by small clapboard shutters that reach up to the windows. The round-arched portal in the center is lined by two caryatids designed as angels, supporting a shell-shaped entablature with the balcony above. The inscription in the cartouche above the portal refers to the year 1713 with a chronogram. The balcony portal is crowned with a broken pediment decorated with acanthus foliage and volutes.

The facade on the street side has a similar external appearance to the marketplace facade. Here, the pilasters at the base are connected with a cornice in a five-axis design. Above the round-arched portal there is an ornamental cover. It is framed by two Corinthian columns. In the pair of pilasters behind it there are two small figure niches, which are empty today. The facade on the courtyard side is simpler, so the main cornice has only one link and the windows have a simple framing. The church is covered by a high hipped roof.

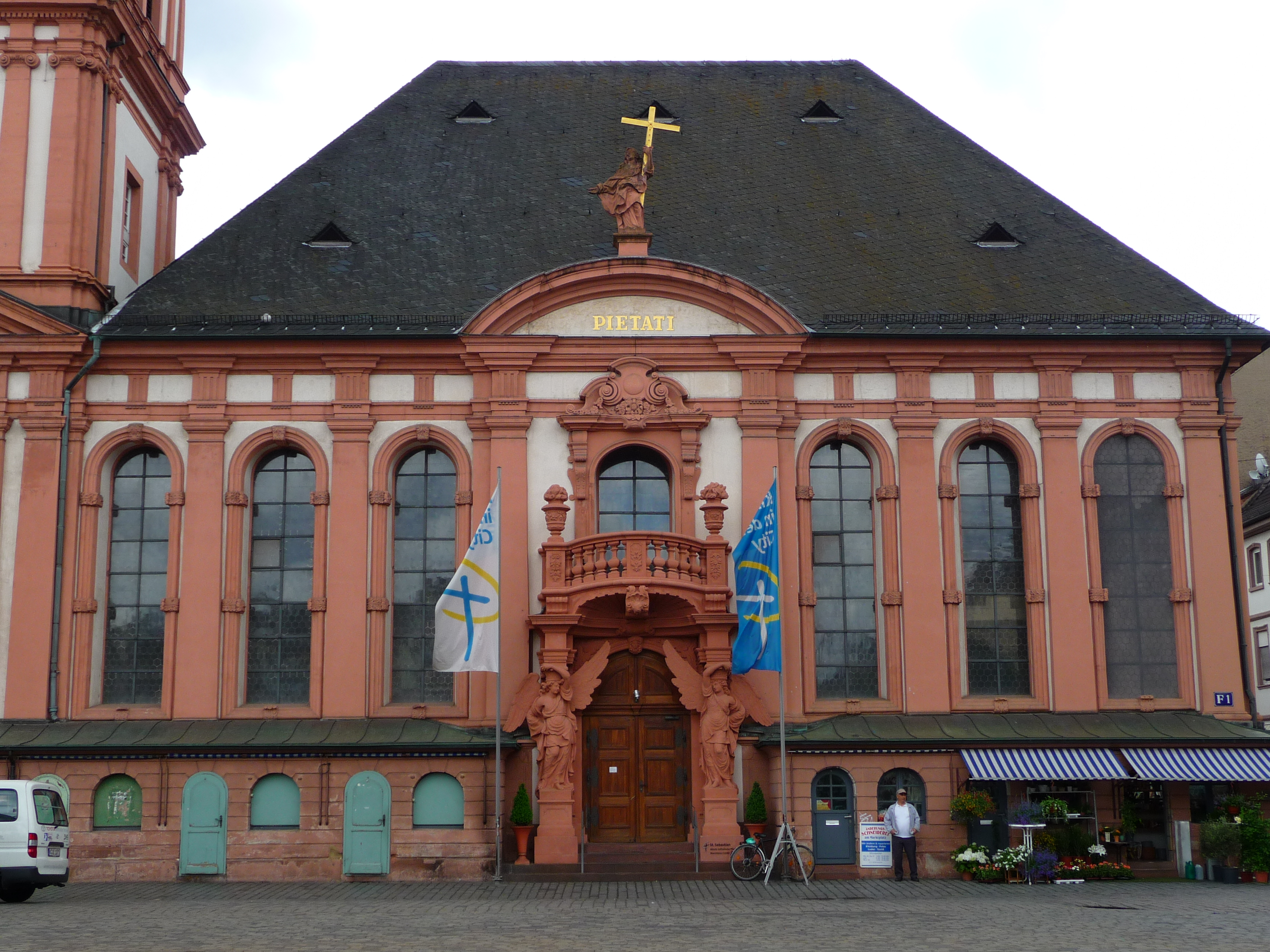
St. Sebastian

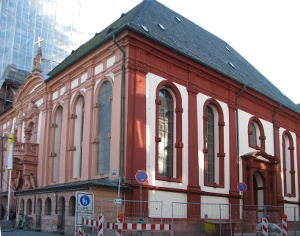
View at the beginning of 2011: the street front on the right has already received a strong red tone

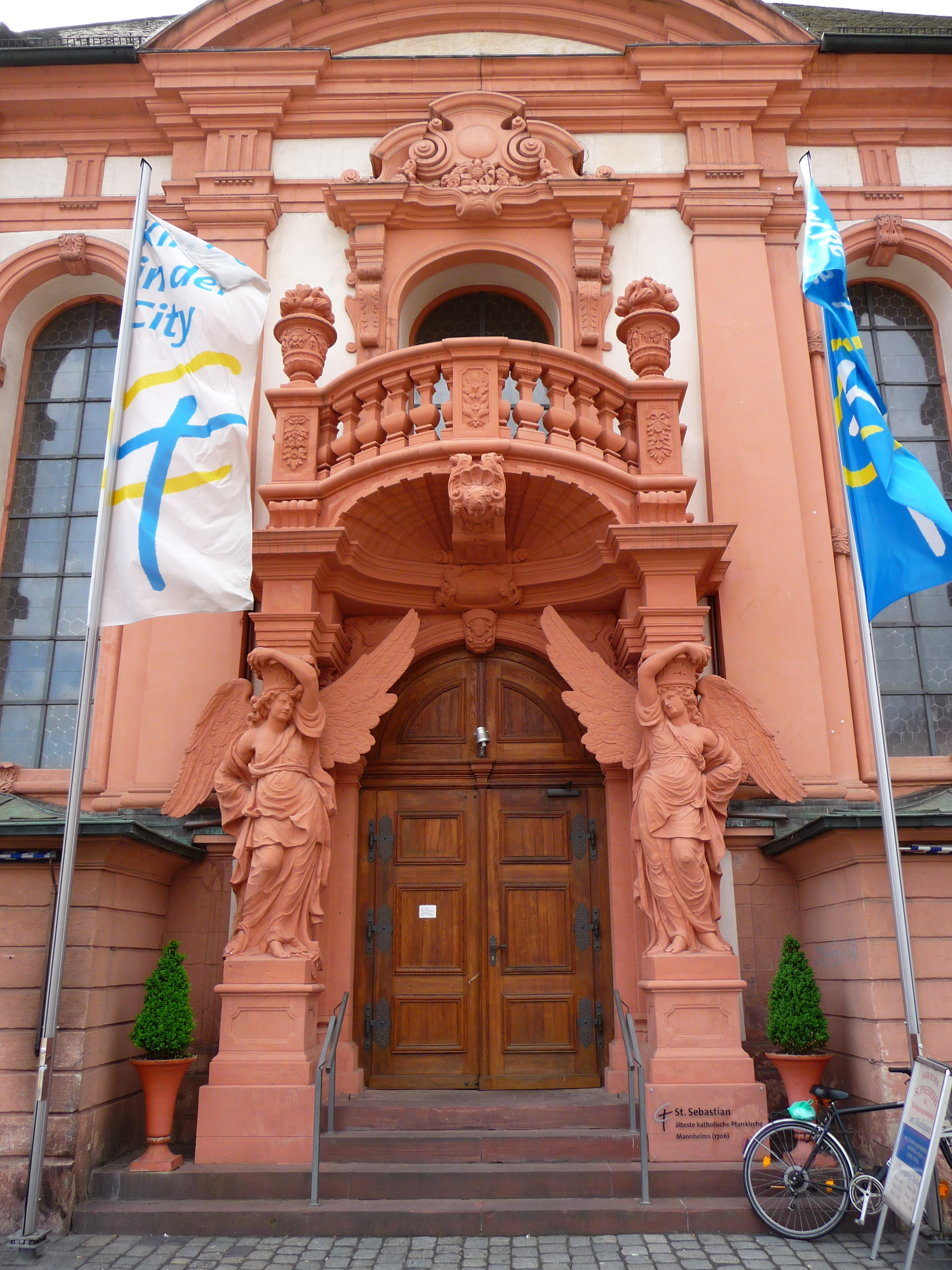
Marktplatzportal

=== Bell tower ===
Ringing for Sunday service

According to a settlement of 1908, the tower belongs to the city of Mannheim and the bells are jointly owned by the political and parish communities. In the mighty bell tower hangs a relatively small peal, but it is a completely preserved four-part baroque peal from the 18th century. The large bell is probably a semitone too high, because in the Baroque period many bells were built on triads (it should be the four-part E minor seventh chord e1-g1-h1-d2). The bell is a complete baroque bell.

No.	Sound	Casting year	Founder, casting location	Ø (mm)
1	f^{1}	1761	Johann Michael Steiger, Mannheim	1210
2	g^{1}	1720	Heinrich Ludwig Gosman, Landau	1010
3	h^{1}	1709	Johann Adam Roth, Mainz	820
4	d^{2}	1747	Johann Michael Steiger, Mannheim	650

Carillon: "Ein Jäger aus Kurpfalz"

In 1956, Friedrich Wilhelm Schilling cast a 23-voice carillon with a range of d2-d4, which is housed in the tower lantern and plays daily at 7:45, 11:45 and 17:45. It has six rolls, each with six songs. Each roll is used for one month and then changed by hand.

=== Interior ===
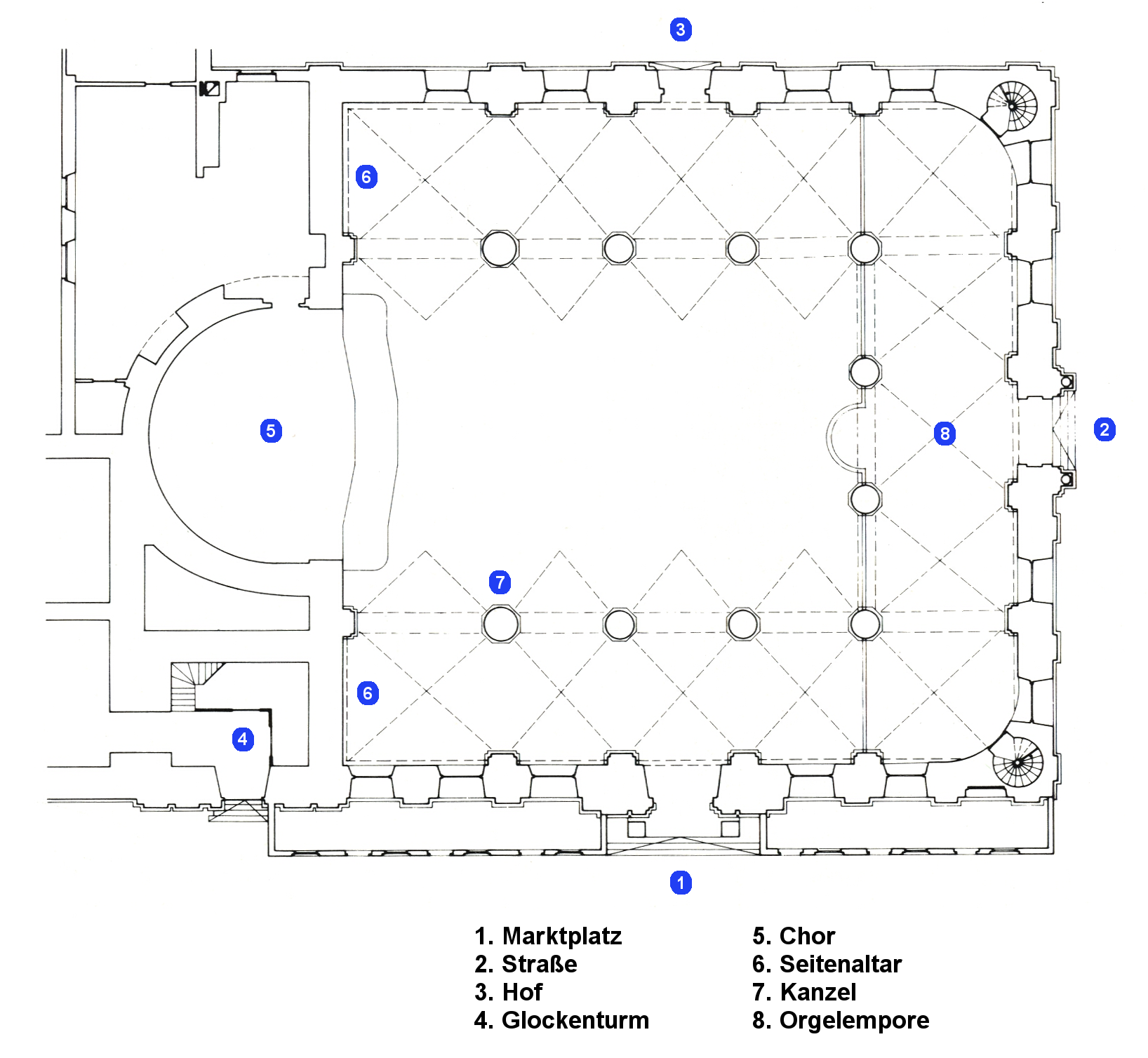
Church floor plan

The nave of the three-nave relay church rises above a roughly square ground plan. The semi-circular choir adjoins to the east. The edge length of the interior without the choir is about 26 meters. Ten strong columns provide the subdivision: Two times four columns delimit the central nave and the two side aisles from each other; the last pair of columns and two columns set between them support the organ loft. Each column stands on an octagonal base and has an attic base and a Corinthian capital. The room height in the barrel-vaulted central nave is a good 15 meters, in the groin vault side naves just under 12 meters. The choir is vaulted by a half-dome with stitch caps and originally had eight round-arched windows (two mock windows on the left, two shades in the center, and two real windows on the right); the pilasters between them were probably stuccoed. The communion bench, built in 1741, separating the nave and the choir, is made of marbled sandstone.

==== High altar ====
The first high altar, now lost, was based on a 1739 design by the court architect Alessandro Galli da Bibiena. The work was executed by Franz Zeller (carpenter), Paul Egell (sculptor), and Ferdinandus de Flans (gilder), and completed in 1741. In retrospect, the work of art was a "masterpiece of the rococo period."

The wood-carved altar showed (executed in half relief) the crucified Jesus Christ, to the left of the cross Mary, John and Mary Magdalene, to the right of the cross two putti, flanking the saints Roch and Sebastian. All the figures were painted in white. The composition was surrounded by a gilded baldachin at the top and gilded passages at the sides. Inside, next to the passages, two angels knelt, worshipping the cross and the tabernacle incorporated below; above the passages were busts of Saints Philip Neri and Charles Borromeo.

Because it was a "regrettable sign of worldly un-spirit and obtrusive un-art", the rococo altar was demolished in 1875 and sold in 1879 for 500 marks to the Berlin Museum of Decorative Arts, where it burned - except for a few parts now in the Bode Museum - in 1945. It was replaced in 1877/1878 by a historicized ciborium executed in stuccolustro. This in turn was damaged in a bombing raid in April 1943 and subsequently replaced by a new high altar consecrated on 28 March 1954 - a wooden relief of the coronation of Mary created in 1954 by Karl Baur (1881-1968). By the same artist are the carved figures of the saints John, Paul, Peter, and Sebastian, placed to the side of the wooden relief in 1956, and the tabernacle. The celebration altar was moved away from the wall toward the people after the liturgical reform of the Second Vatican Council, losing the relationship between the mensa and the relief.

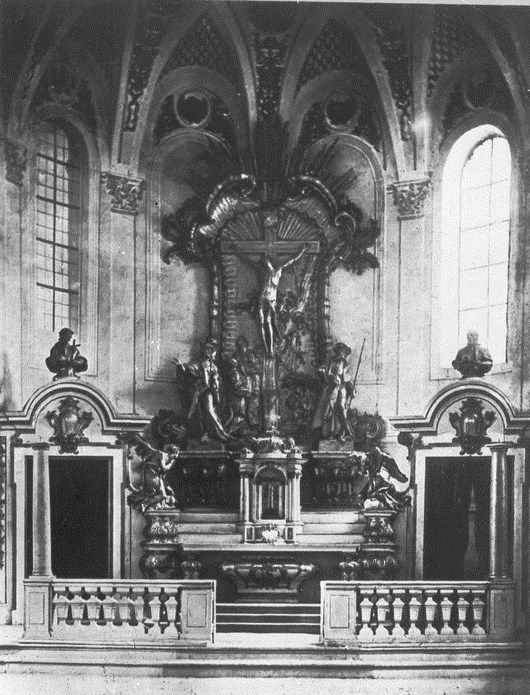
Nave, view of the choir with high altar (as of 1875)

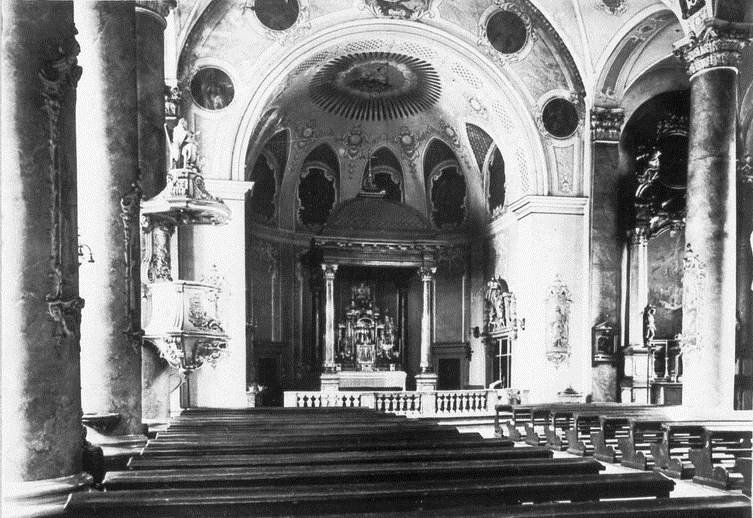
Nave, view of the choir with high altar (as of 1920)

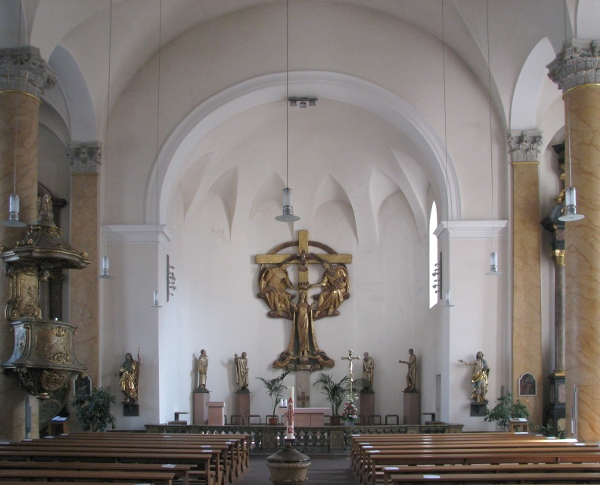
Nave, view of the choir with high altar (as of 2009)

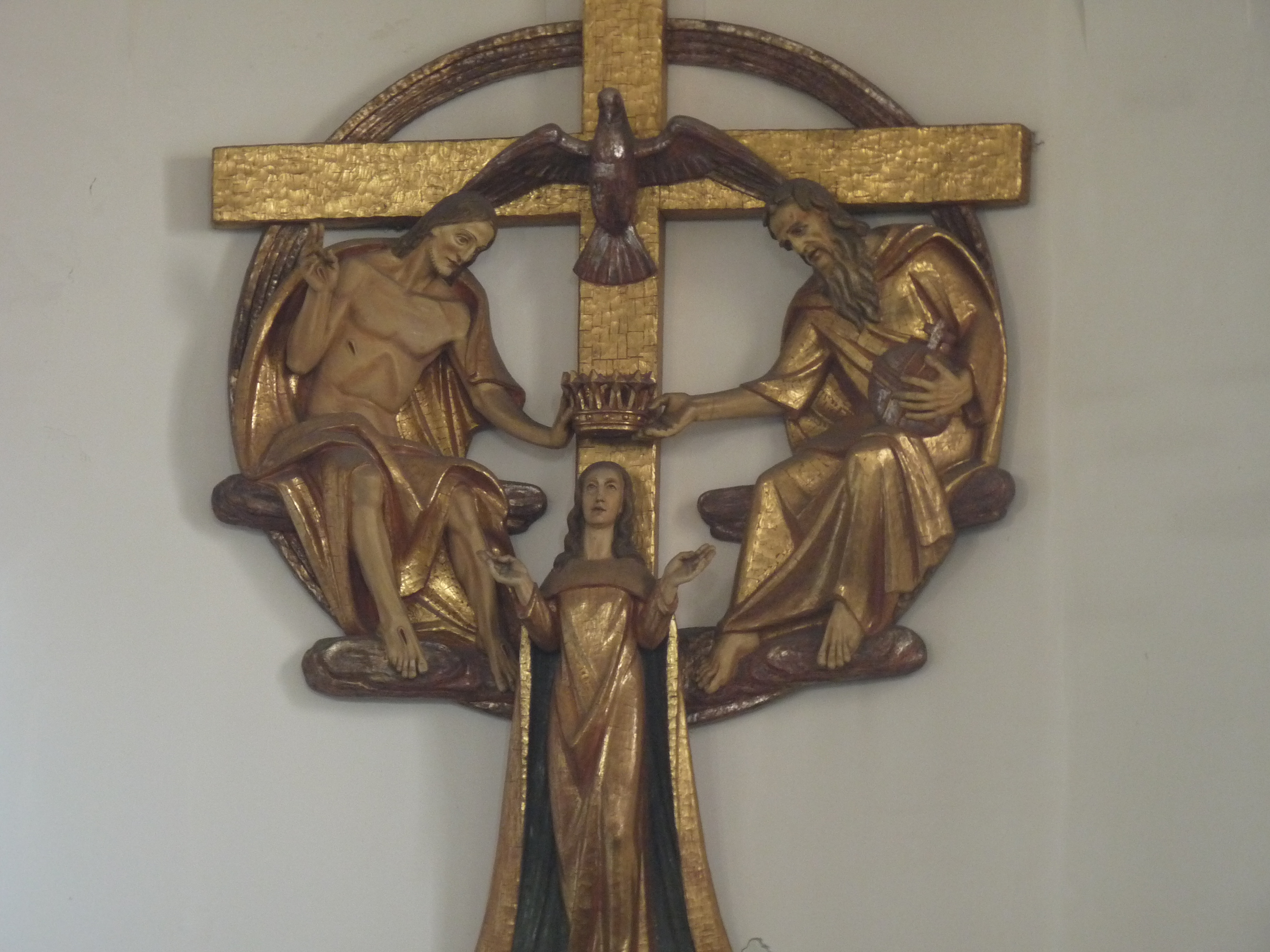
High altar, detail

==== Side altars ====
The side altars date back to the 18th century. The left side altar, dedicated to St. Theodore, is the work of the sculptor Peter Anton von Verschaffelt. In 1778, Elector Charles Theodore had acquired relics of his namesake in Rome and donated the altar. In the figure niche there is - in the style of classicism - a group of Madonnas, a plaster study for Verschaffelt's marble sculpture in St. Bavo's Cathedral in Ghent, which in turn is based on Michelangelo's Madonna in the Church of Our Lady in Bruges. In the transverse oval pediment there has been a relief of St. Anne since 1925. It comes from an old chapel in Kappelrodeck, where it may have come from the abbey of Allerheiligen.

The right side altar, like the left, made of reddish marble, is dominated by an altarpiece painted on oil with a depiction of the Last Supper. The excerpt image shows the archangel Michael. The flanking statues of St. John Nepomuk and St. Sebastian were once originally positioned in the reverse order.

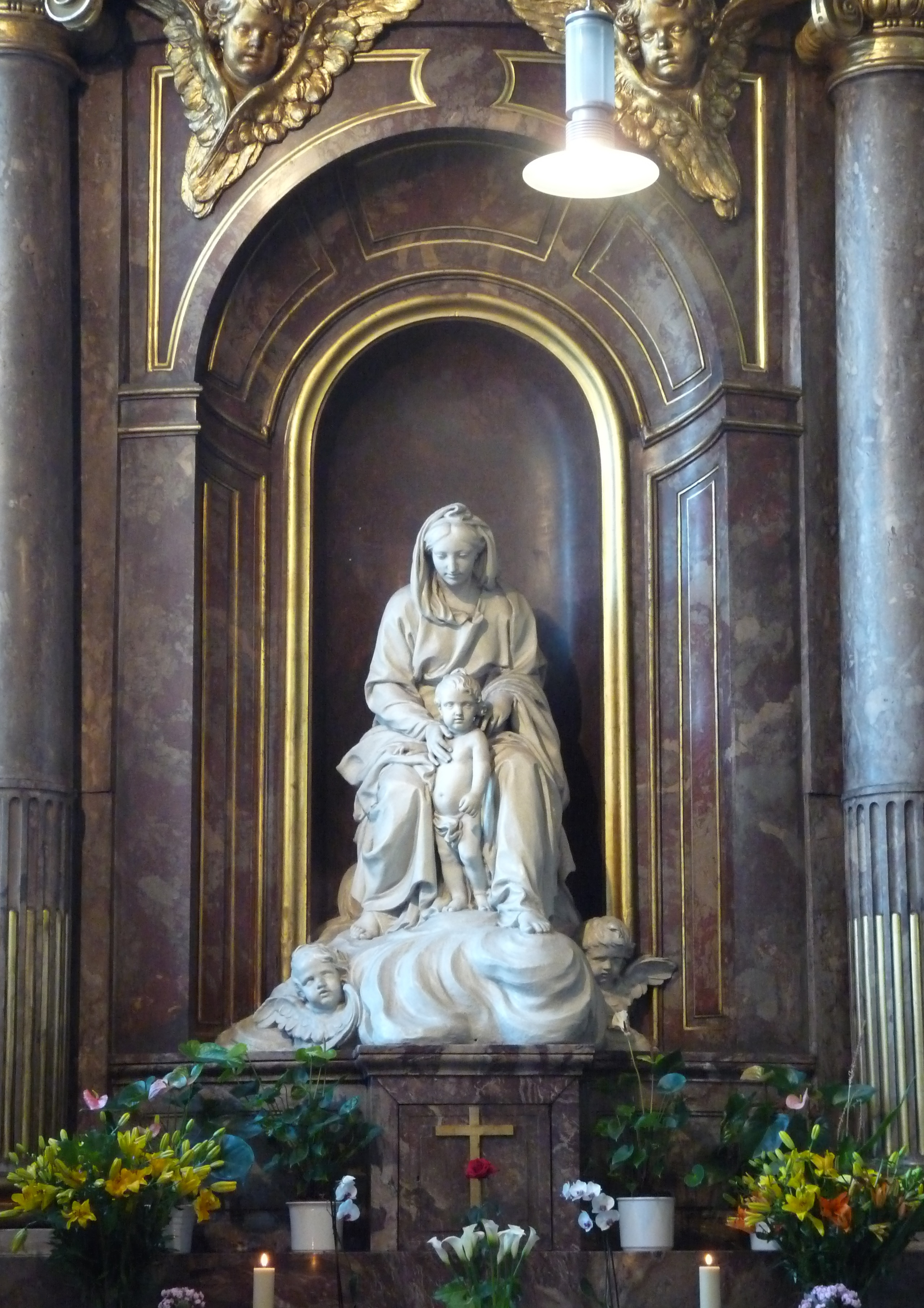
Left side altar

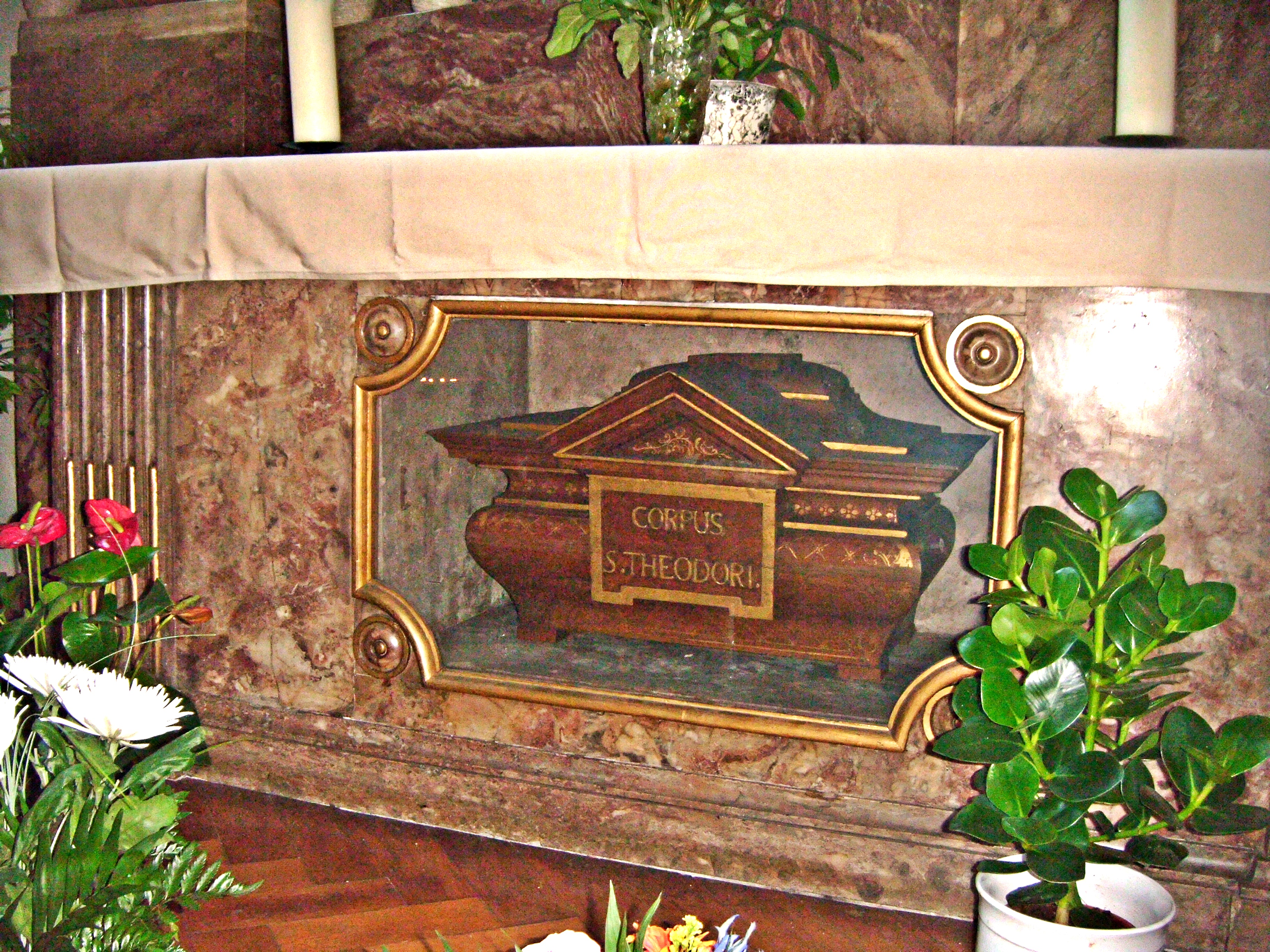
Reliquary of St. Theodore in the left side altar

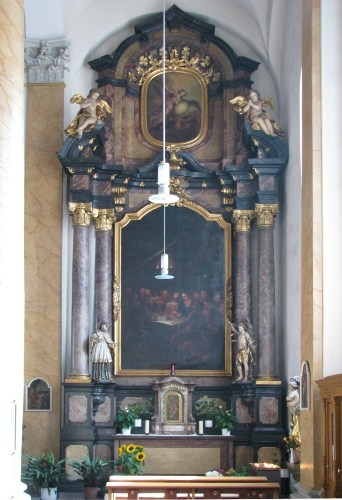
Right side altar

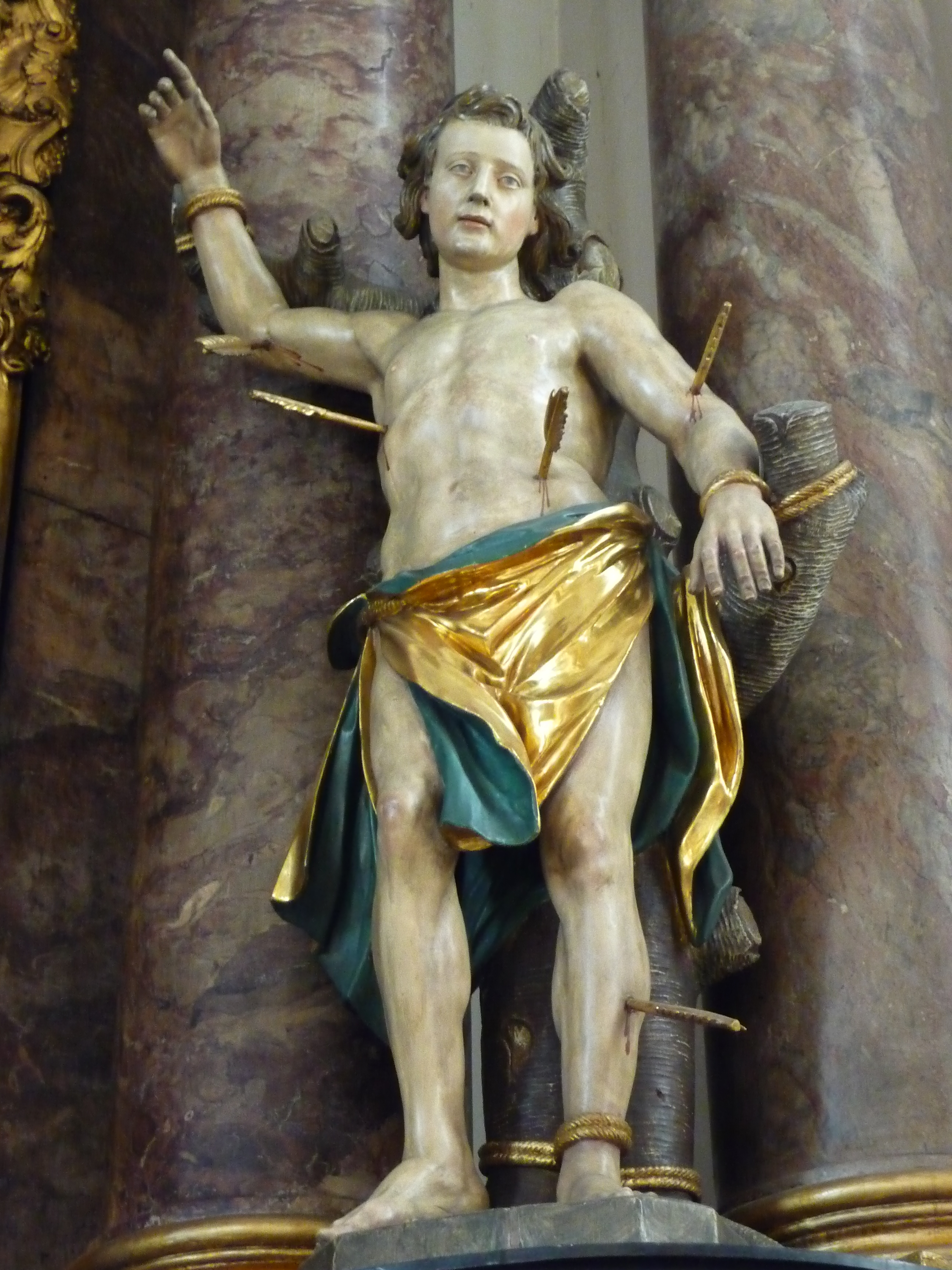
Representation of St. Sebastian on the right side altar

==== Pulpit ====
The design for the pulpit, created in 1742, came - like the design for the original high altar - from Alessandro Galli da Bibiena. The work of art is considered "exemplary for the art at the Electoral Palatine court of the forties of the 18th century. The elegantly curved staircase is decorated with strapwork, the pulpit basket and sound cover are decorated with volutes and rocailles. The gilded relief on the pulpit basket depicts the Adoration of the Lamb according to the Book of Revelation. On the volutes of the pulpit basket there used to be four figures of evangelists. These were removed in 1873 because they were "exuberantly pompous". The figure of Moses with the tablets of the law, which once stood on the sound cover, was removed during the restoration in 1936 and replaced by a knob. In 1954, the 83-centimeter sculpture was found in construction debris and given to the Reiß Engelhorn Museum. The carved pelican with its young, which has crowned the sound lid since 1952, comes from the tabernacle of the Catholic church in Landshausen. At the base of the pulpit are the coats of arms of the donor couple, Count Andreas Ehrenreich von Polheim, who died in 1735, and his wife, Countess Therese Wilhelmine von Polheim-Winkelhausen. Therese Wilhelmine served as prince abbess of Lindau from 1743 to 1757 and financed, among other things, the new construction of the collegiate church of Our Lady, whose choir arch bears the same coats of arms.

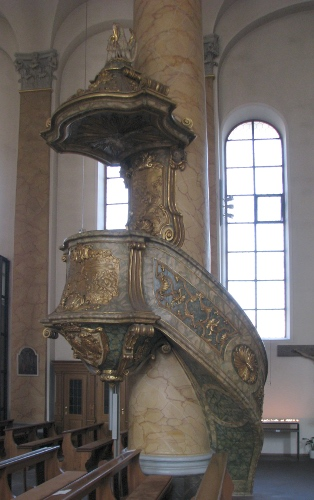
Pulpit

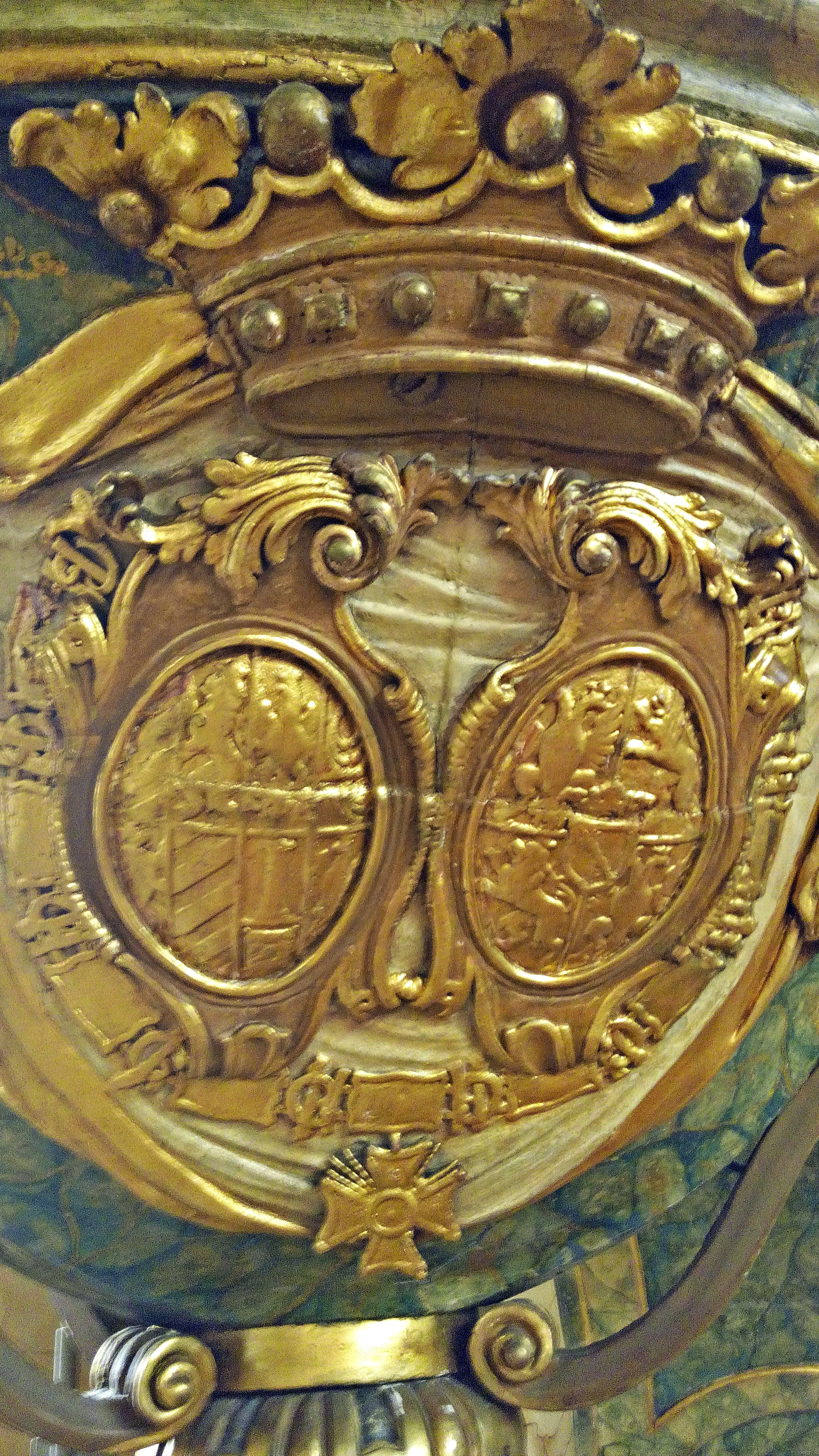
Pulpit, coat of arms

==== Baptismal font and organ ====
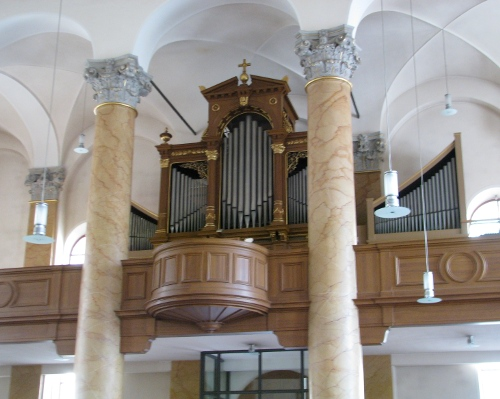
Organ

The baptismal font was donated in 1843. It is made of marbled sandstone and decorated with acanthus ornaments. At the two entrances from the marketplace and from the street there are two shell-shaped holy water font each, made of gray-reddish marble, which were created around 1720.

The organ is located in the matroneum opposite the choir. The first organ in the church was built in 1715 by the Frankfurt organ builder Johann Friedrich Macrander and used until 1872. Based on a design by the architect Bender, Voit constructed a new organ, which was shown at the exhibition "Kunst und Gewerbe" in Karlsruhe in 1875 and installed in St. Sebastian two years later. The present three-manual organ was built by the Klais company in 1961. For this, Klais took over the old organ prospect and added two side wings. The wooden pipes of the Voit organ were also taken over.

==== More artworks ====
Oil paintings by an unknown artist make up the Stations of the Cross. They were created in the second quarter of the 19th century for the parish church in Kappelrodeck and brought to Mannheim in 1955.

== Burial ground ==
According to Jakob Baroggio Die Geschichte Mannheims von dessen Entstehung bis 1861, the church has a crypt in which a large number of people of local historical importance are buried. Partially their epitaphs have been preserved, they are located in the wall under the organ gallery. Several of them are qualitative marble works by Franz Conrad Linck (1730-1793). Some memorial stones were lost due to the destruction of the Second World War.

Noch vorhandene Epitaphien sind für:

- Alois Anton Joseph Georg Cochem (1711-1783), Electoral Palatine court councillor and government secretary, and his brother Franz Ignatius Valentin Cochem (1718-1759), government chancellor
- Karl Anton Hyacinth von Gallean (1737-1778); Obersthofmeister of the Palatine Elector Karl Theodor and grandfather of Bishop Charles Auguste Marie Joseph de Forbin-Janson (1785-1844), founder of the Pontifical Association of the Holy Childhood
- Lubentius Huben († 1740), Electoral Palatine Geheimrat and benefactor of the parish
- Johann Leonhard Lippe (1671-1737), Electoral Palatine Geheimrat, count palatine and city director of Mannheim
- Adam Heinrich Peter von Riaucour (1761-1762), son of Andreas von Riaucour (1722-1794); Imperial Count and diplomat in the service of the Elector of Saxony
- Franz Joseph von Stengel (1683-1759) Electoral Palatine Geheimrat, knight of the Order of St. Hubert and founder of the noble family von Stengel, with wife Maria Anna Dorothea née. Flender (1689-1758) and the son Paul Heinrich Joseph Xaver von Stengel (1717-1754), Electoral Palatine country recorder in Neustadt an der Weinstraße, father of the French general Heinrich Christian Michael von Stengel (1744-1796), who is listed on the epitaph as one of the donors.

Disappeared epitaphs still surviving in Jakob Baroggio or in the Thesaurus Palatinus of the regional historian Johann Franz Capellini von Wickenburg:

- Johann Bartholomäus von Busch (1680-1739), professor of Roman law, chief appellate court director, Electoral Palatine vice chancellor
- Jakob Friedrich Joseph Gabrieli (1713-1745), court counselor
- Franz Joseph (1727-1733), Gustav Wilhelm (1727-1739) and Johann Christian (1730-1735), sons of the Electoral Palatine government president and minister, respectively, Franz Wilhelm Caspar von Hillesheim (1673-1748)
- Joseph Anton von Kageneck (1701-1747), Electoral Palatine chamberlain, assessor of the Further Austrian knighthood, burgomaster at Friedberg
- Maria Magdalena Lippe née Bencard († 1723), wife of the city director Johann Leonhard Lippe (1671-1737)
- Johannes Franz Eugen von Savoyen (1714-1734); general, grandnephew of Prince Eugen von Savoyen
- Christoph Adam Vöhlin von Frickenhausen (1668-1730), imperial chamberlain, Electoral Palatine privy councilor and chief equerry
- Johann Philipp Georg Dominikus Vöhlin von Frickenhausen (1705-1736), Electoral Palatine chamberlain and Hauptmann of the Royal Guard
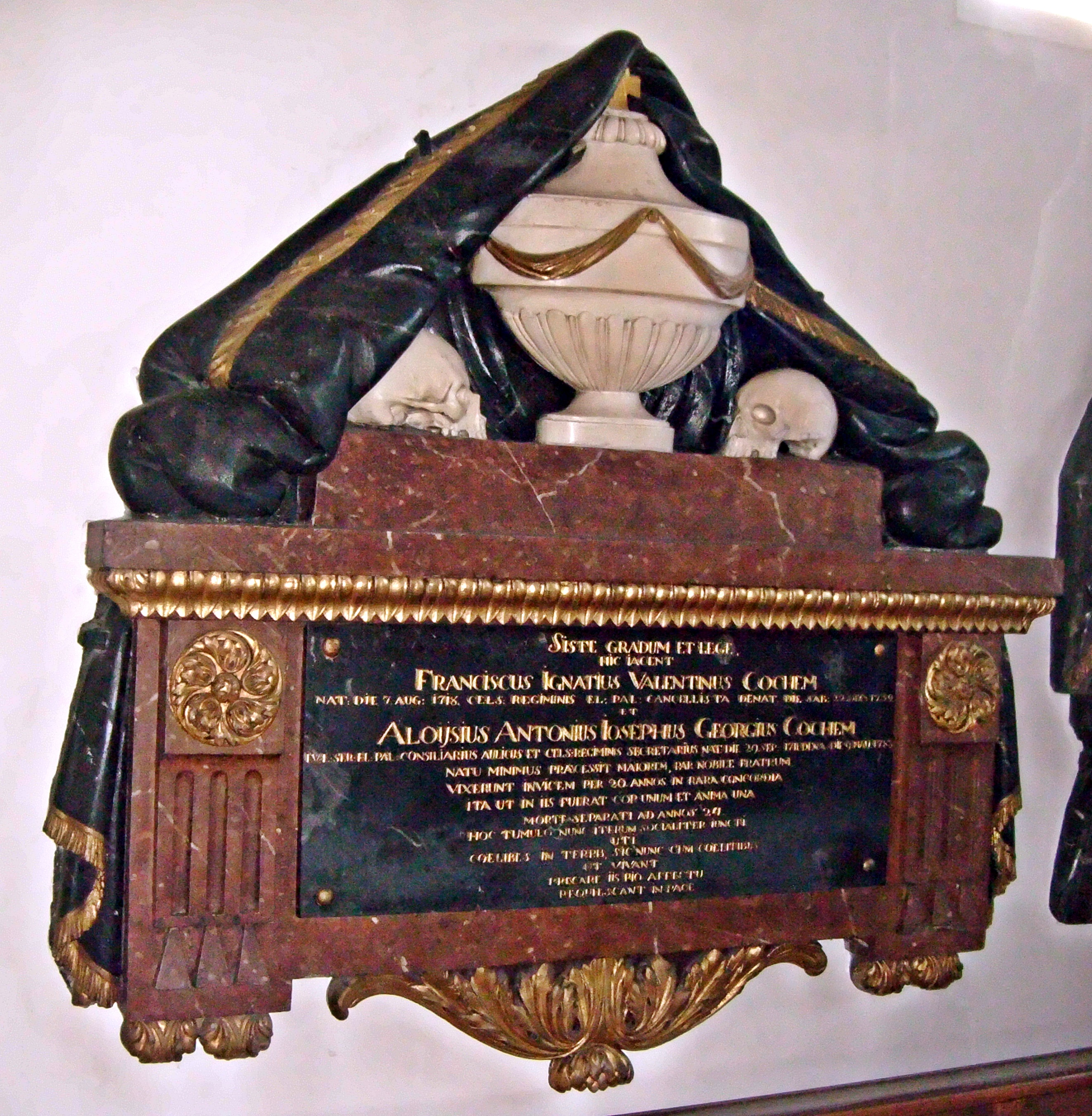
Epitaph of the Cochem brothers

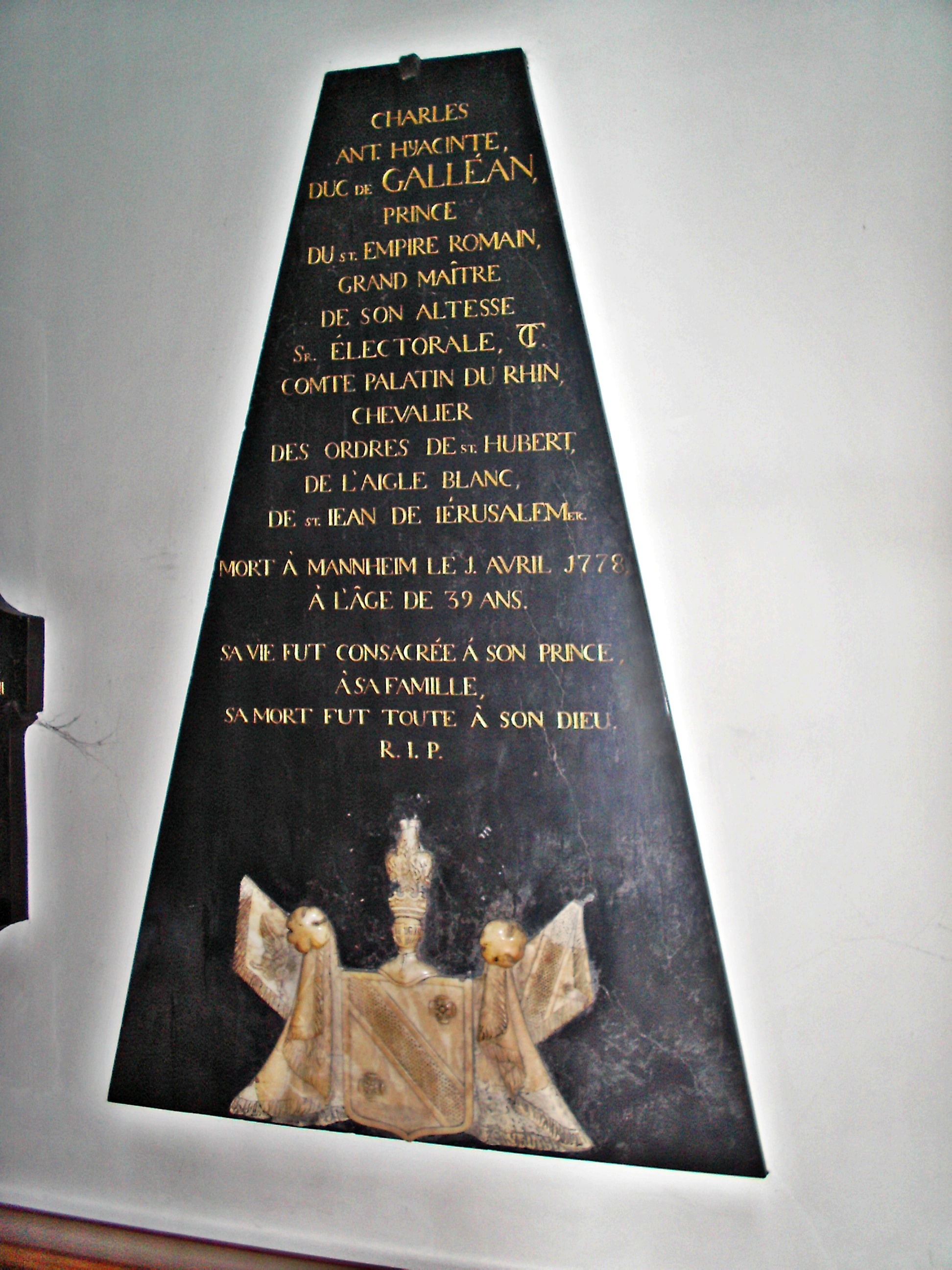
Epitaph Karl Anton Hyacinth of Gallean

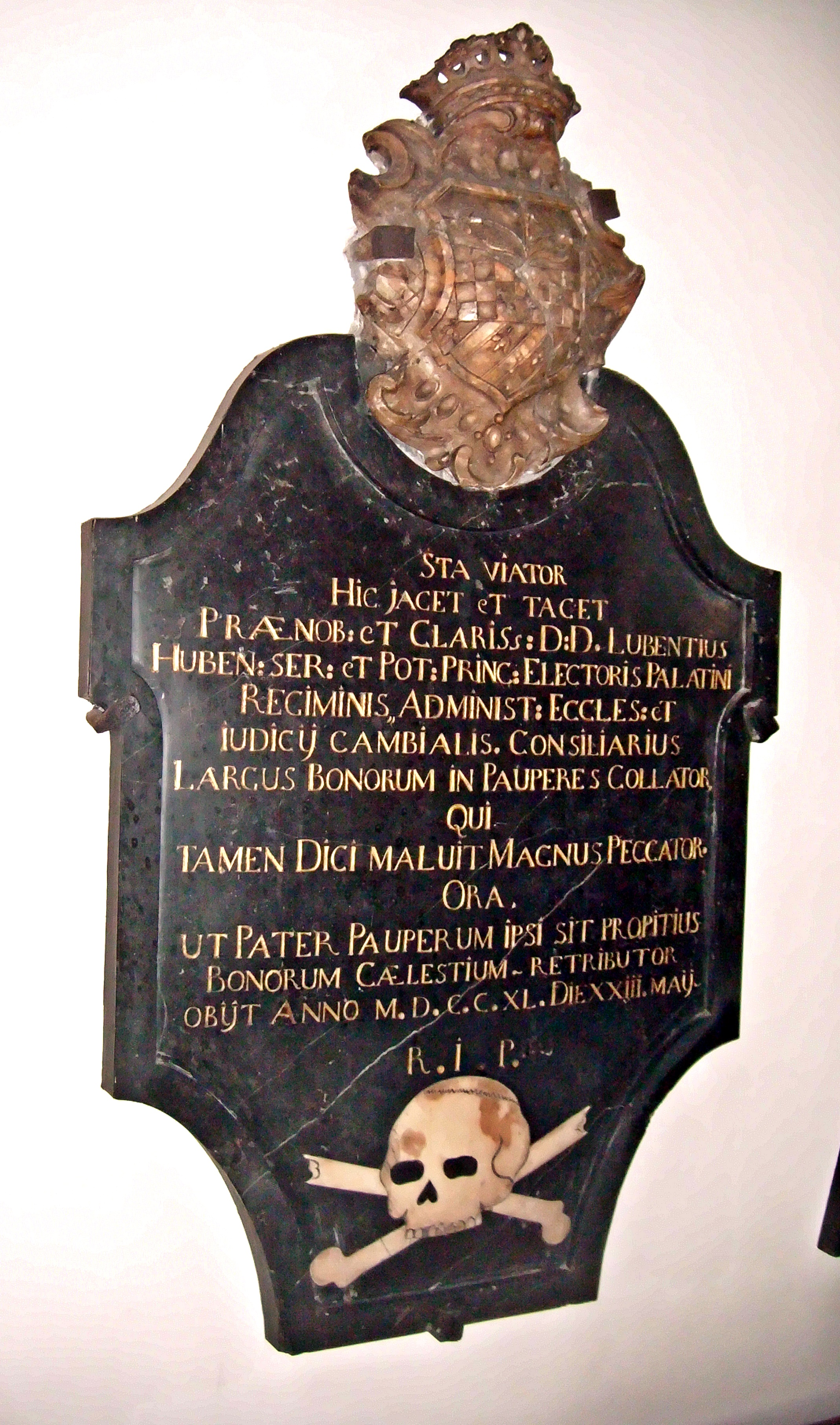
Epitaph Lubentius Huben

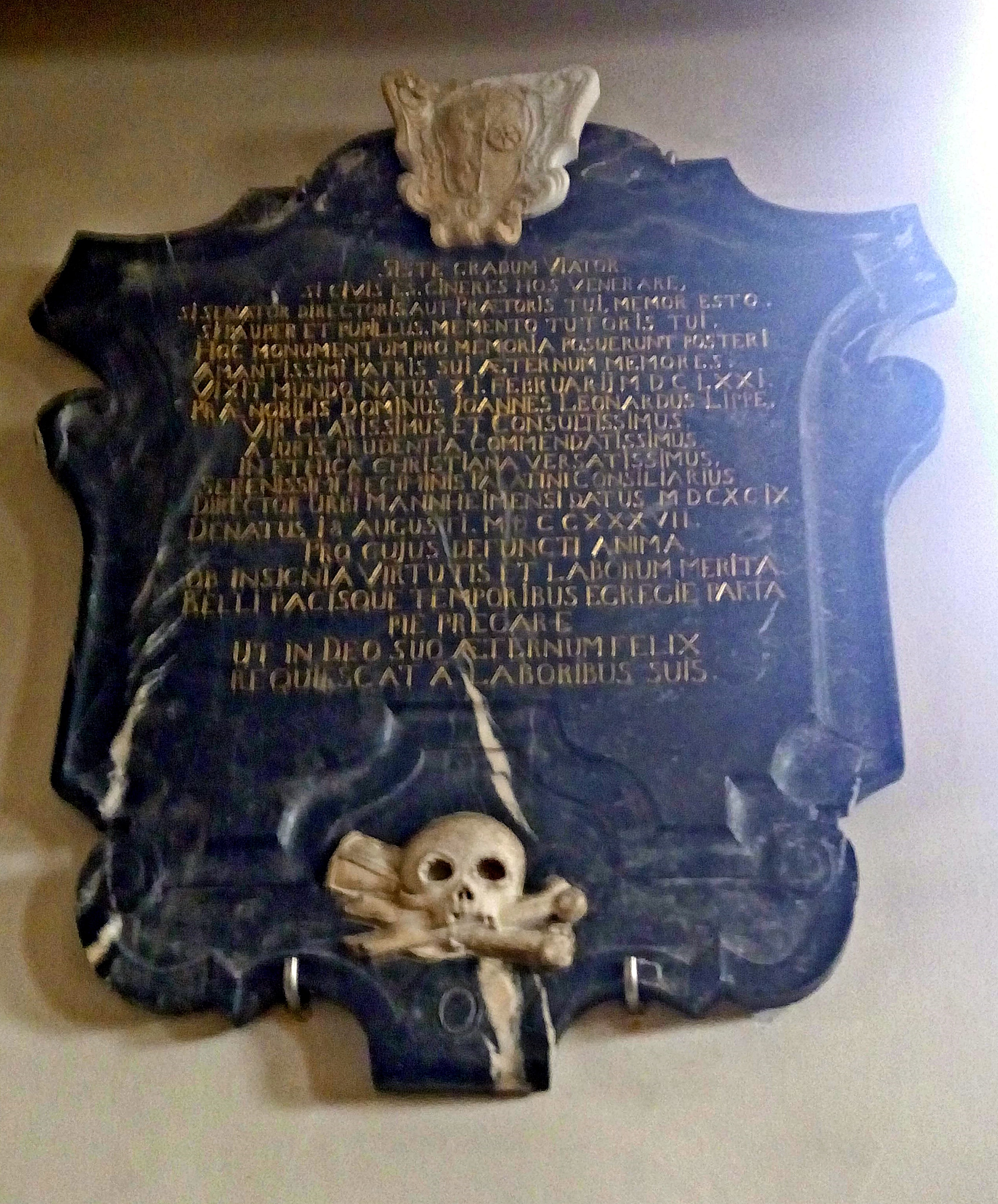
Epitaph Johann Leonhard Lippe

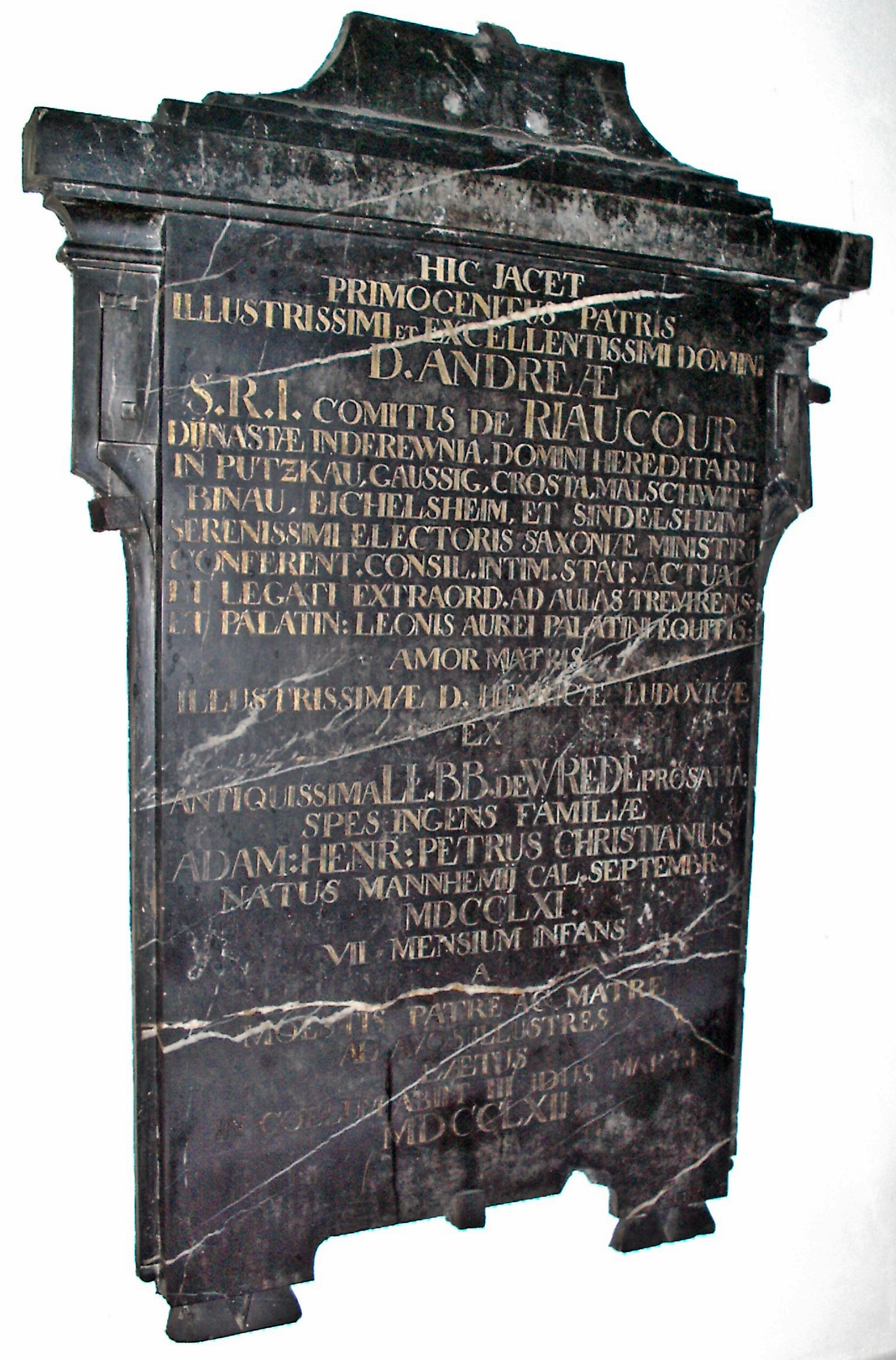
Epitaph Riaucour

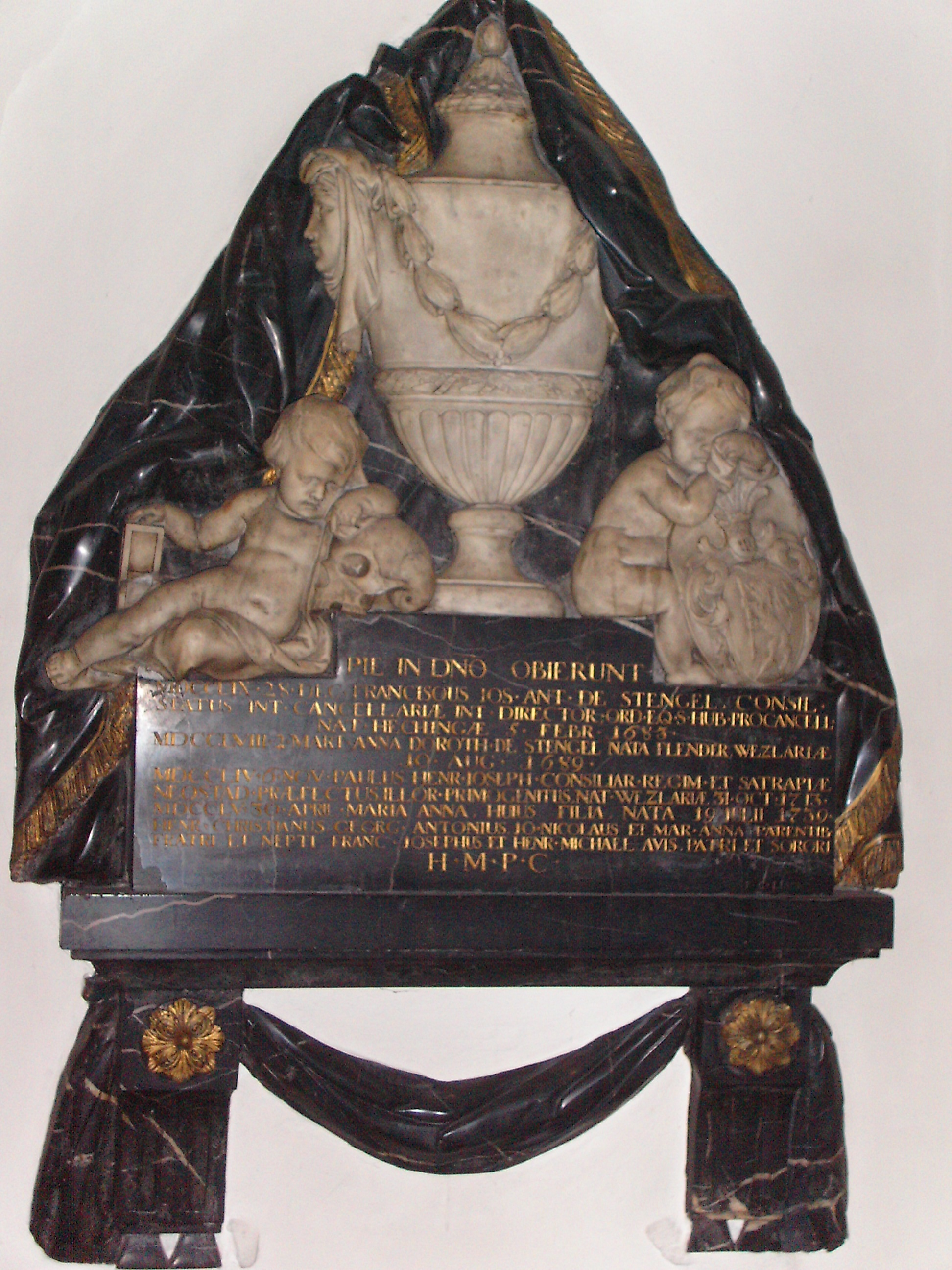
Epitaph family of Stengel

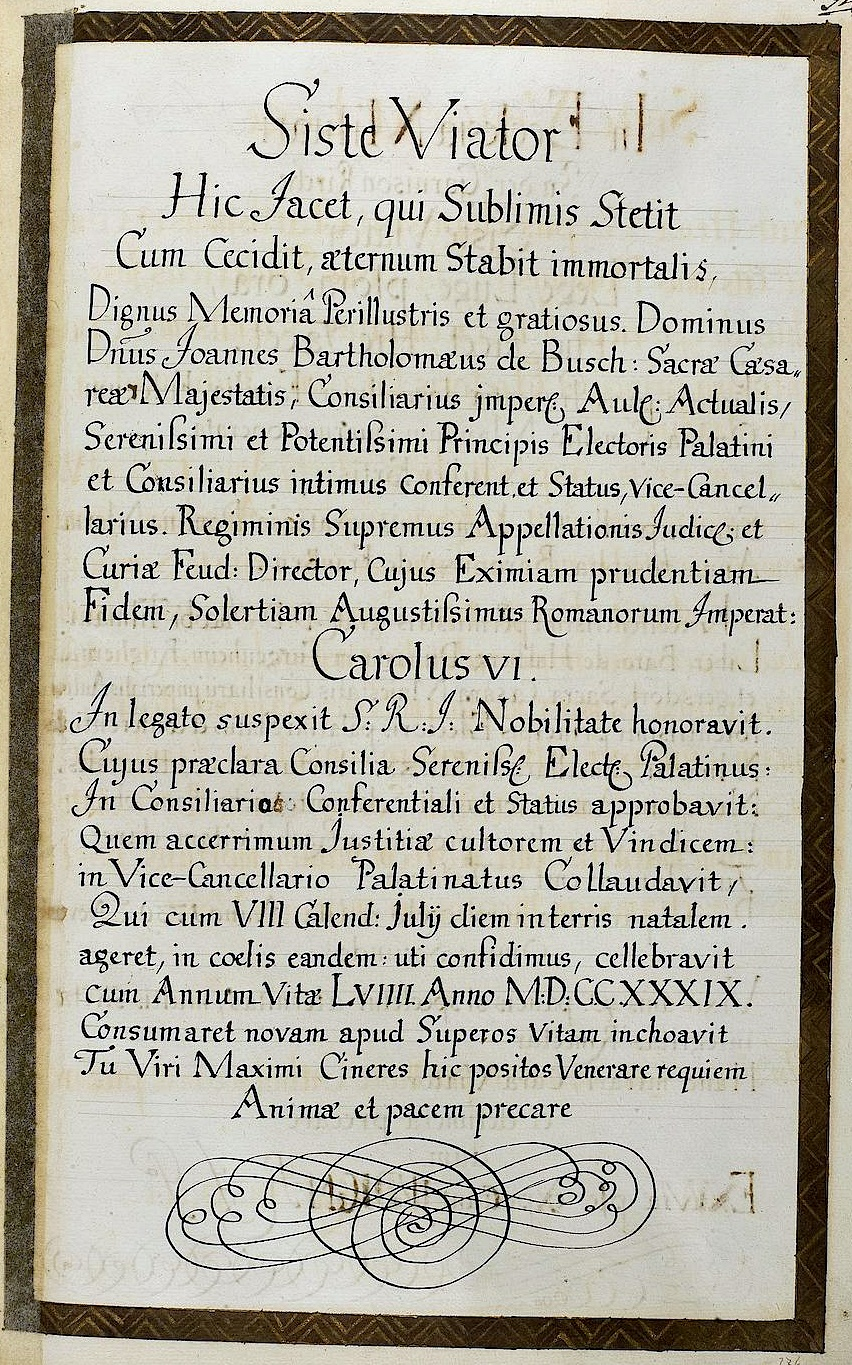
Epitaph Johann Bartholomäus of Busch, from the Thesaurus Palatinus

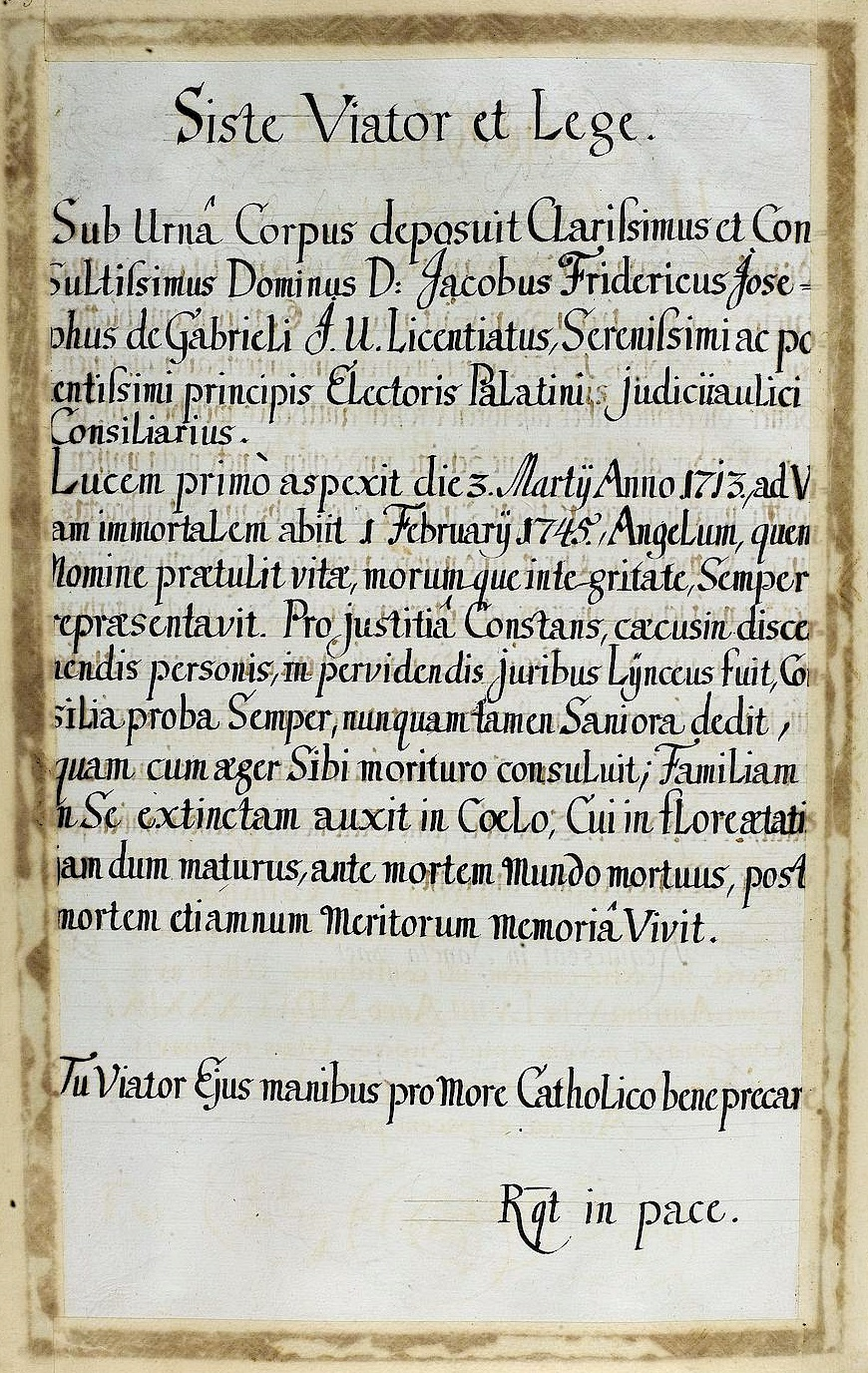
Epitaph Jakob Friedrich Joseph Gabrieli, from the Thesaurus Palatinus

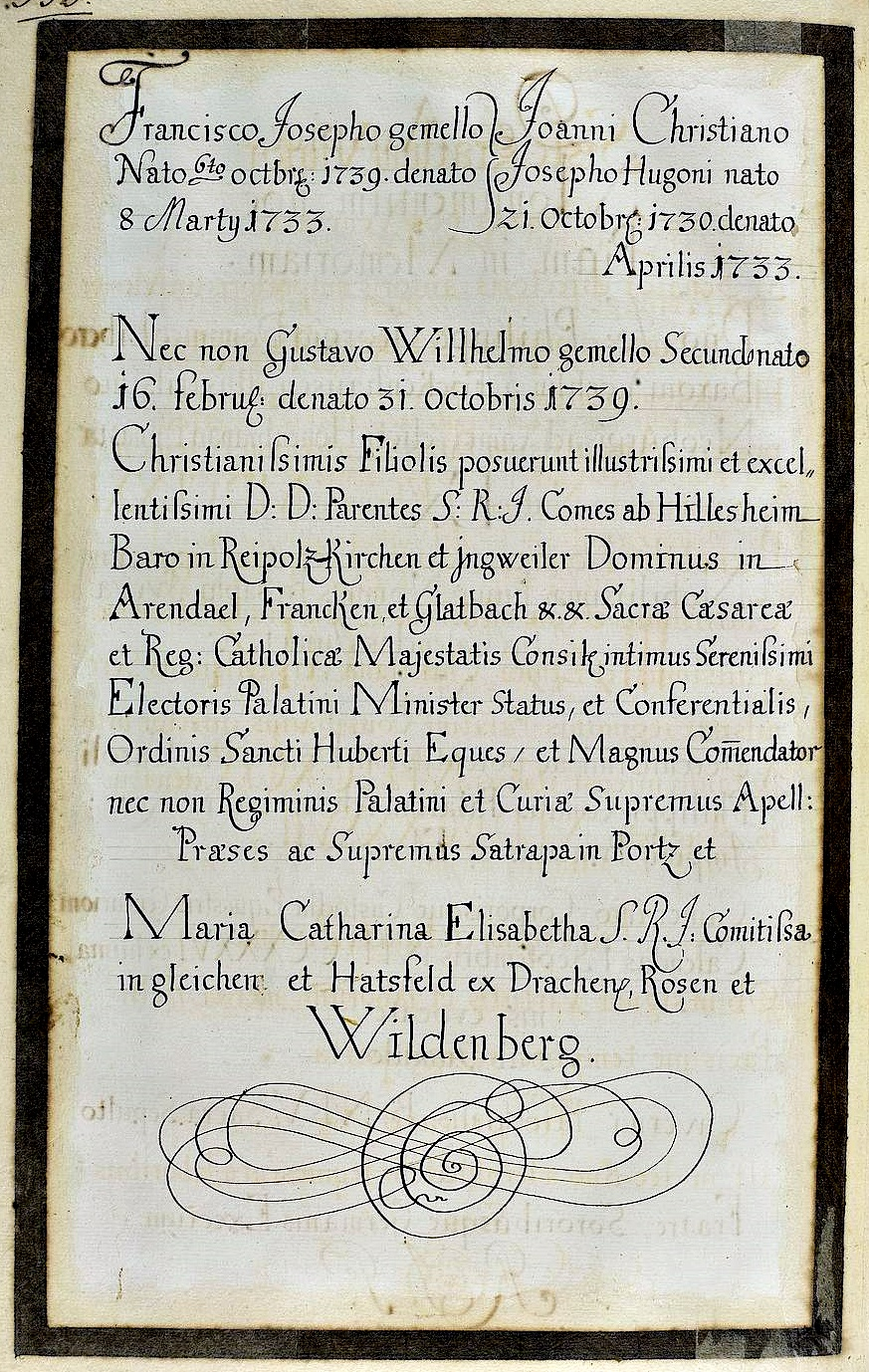
Epitaph inscription "von Hillesheim", from the Thesaurus Palatinus

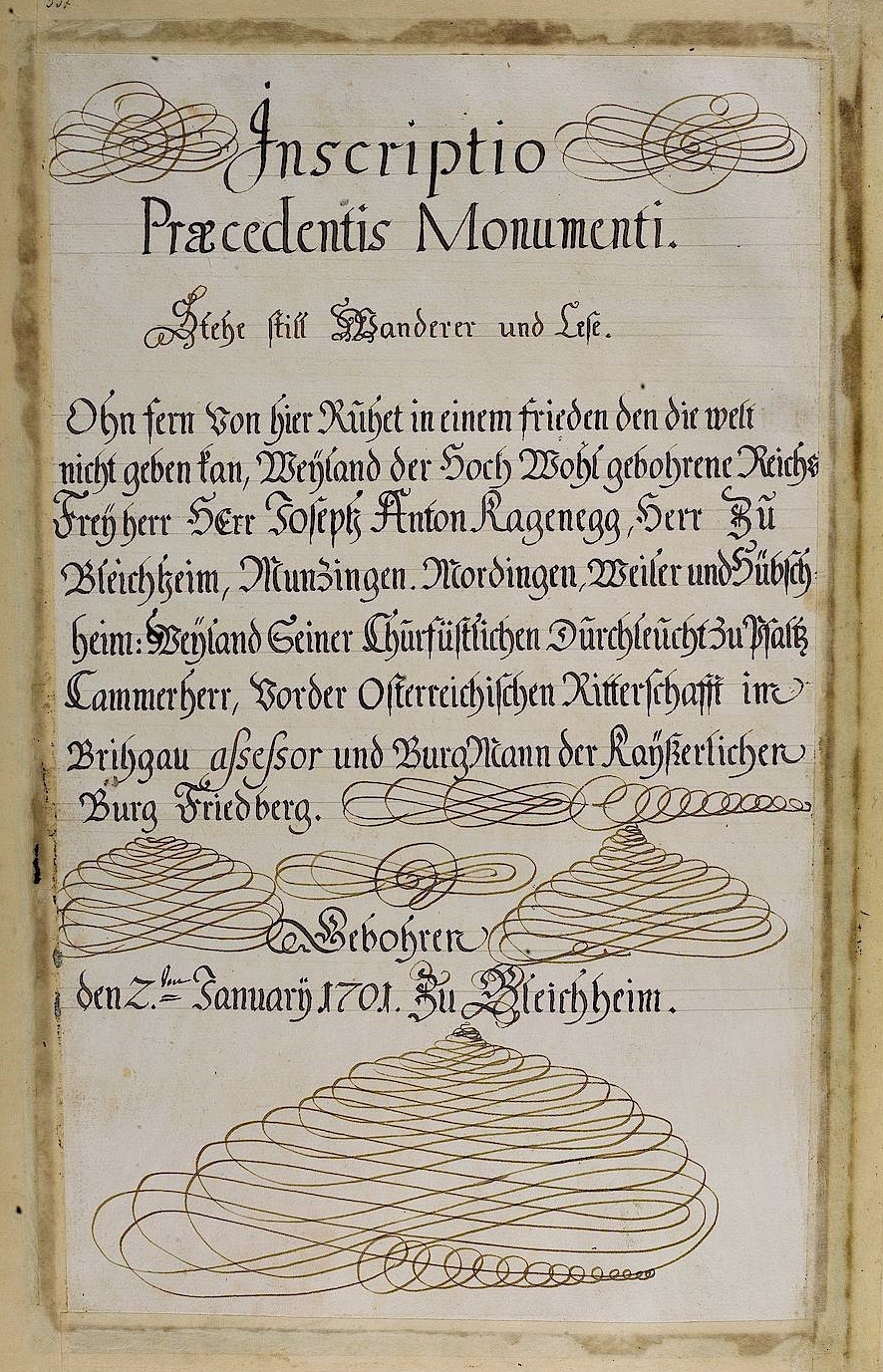
Epitaph Joseph Anton von Kageneck, from the Thesaurus Palatinus

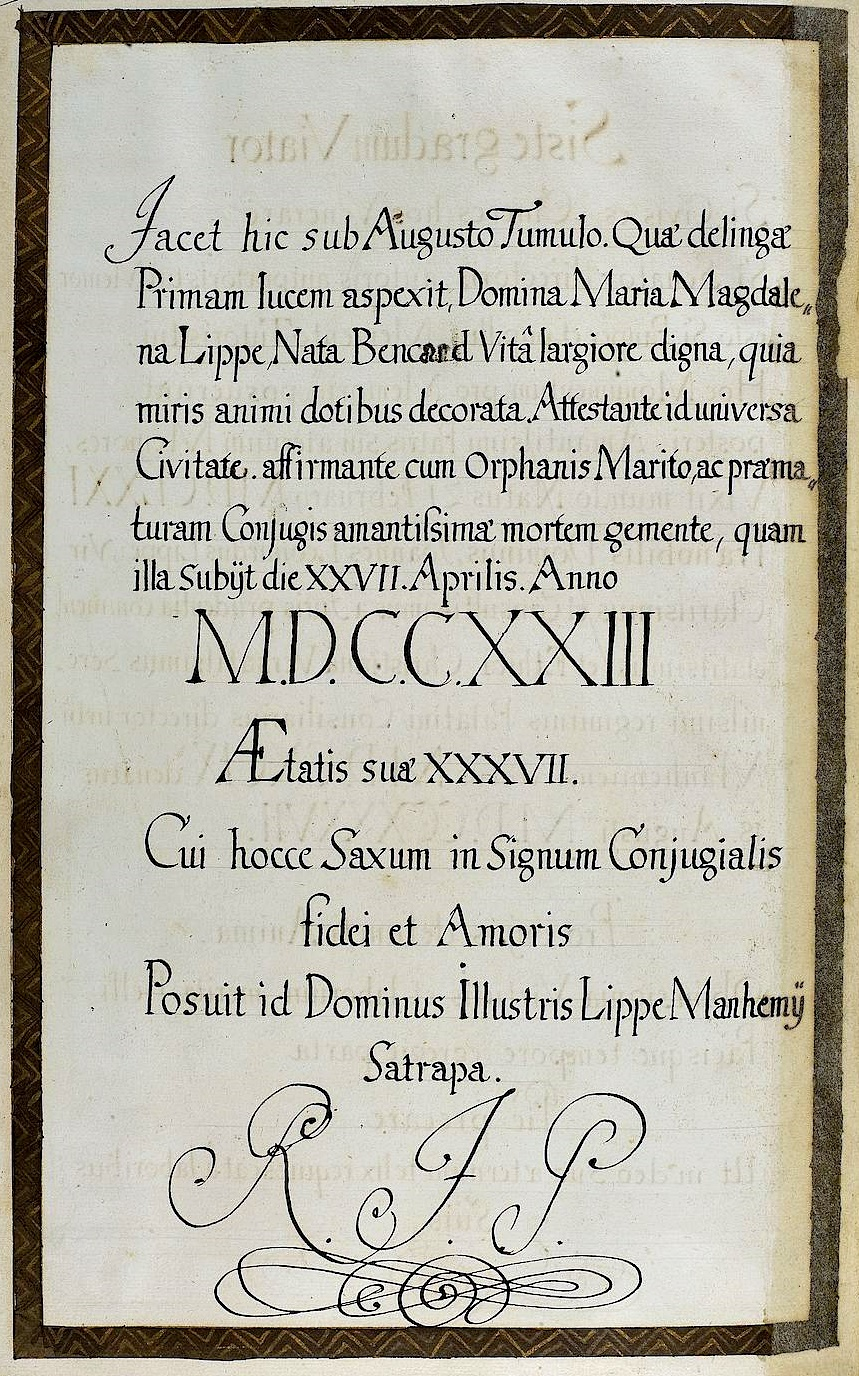
Epitaph inscription Maria Magdalena Lippe née Bencard, from the Thesaurus Palatinus

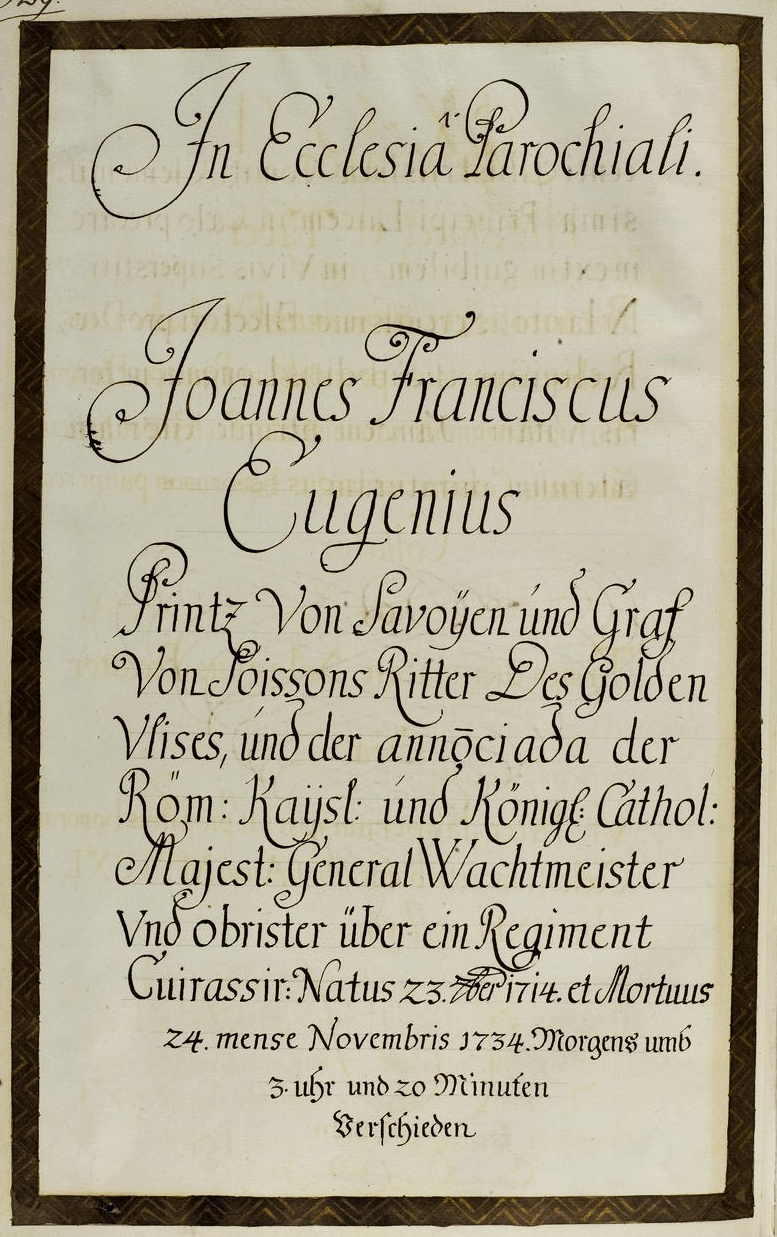
Epitaph John Francis Eugene of Savoy, from the Thesaurus Palatinus

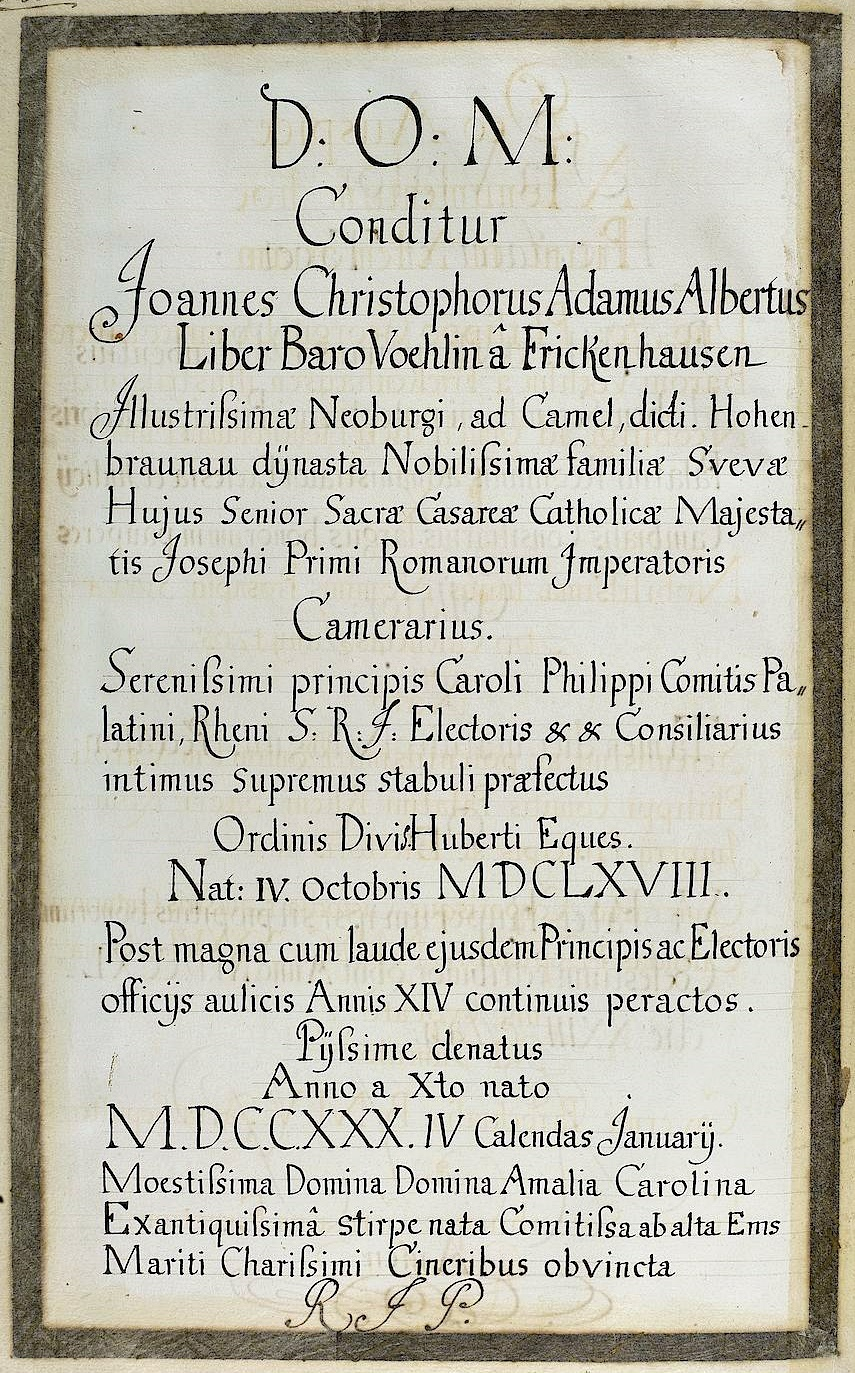
Epitaph Christoph Adam Vöhlin of Frickenhausen, from the Thesaurus Palatinus

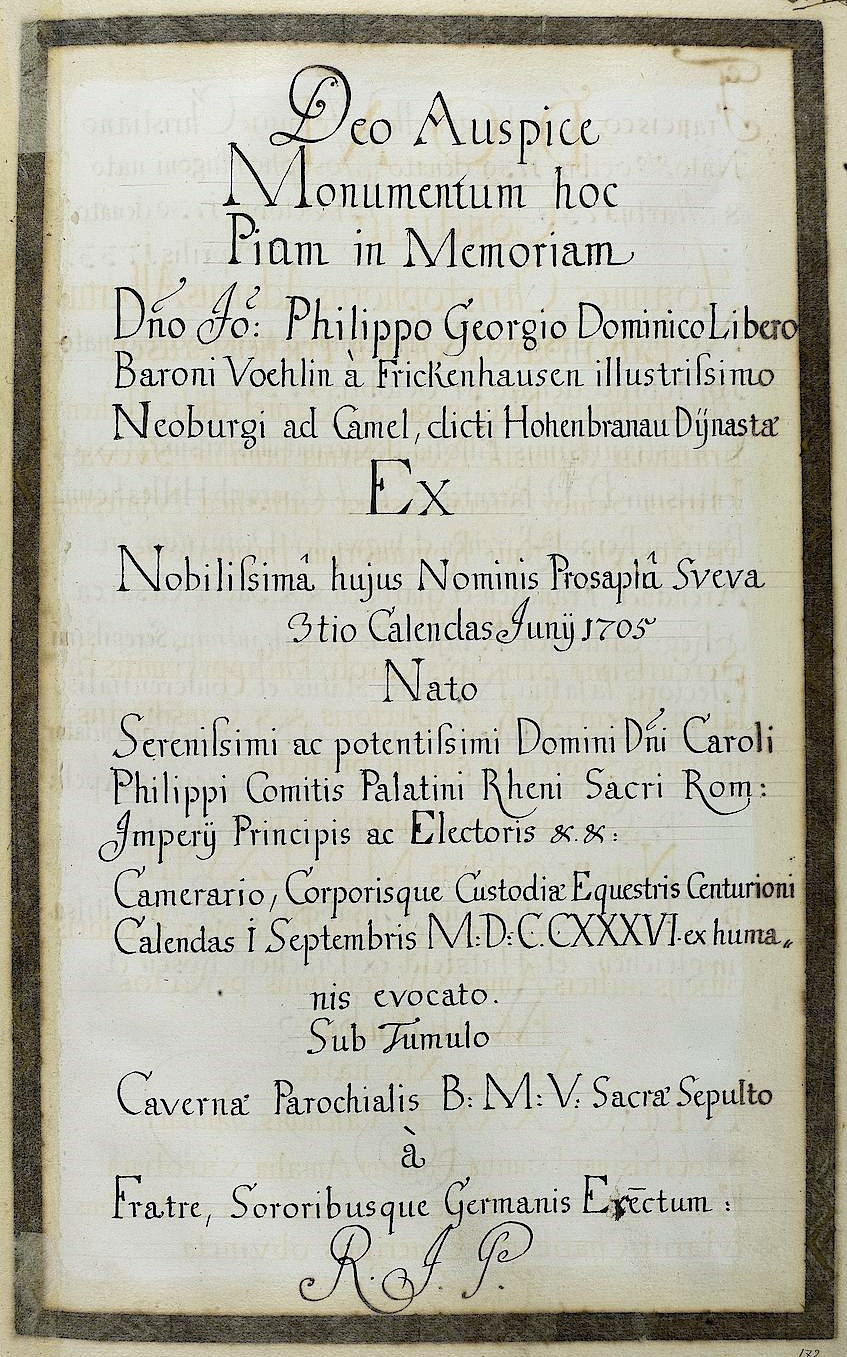
Epitaph inscription Johann Philipp Georg Dominikus Vöhlin of Frickenhausen, from the Thesaurus Palatinus

== Bibliography ==
- Willy Oeser: Um das Schicksal einer alten Pfarrkirche: Grundsätzliche Gedanken zur Wiederherstellung der Unteren Pfarrkirche zum hl. Sebastian in Mannheim. J. Gremm, Mannheim 1934.
- Hans Huth: Die Kunstdenkmäler des Stadtkreises Mannheim I. München 1982, ISBN 3-422-00556-0.
- Clemens Jöckle, Franz-Xaver Portenlänger: Untere Pfarrkirche St. Sebastian Mannheim. 2. Auflage. Regensburg 2005, ISBN 3-7954-4805-0.
- Ulrich Nieß: Das Dorf Mannheim von der urkundlichen Ersterwähnung bis zur Stadtgründung (766 bis 1607). In: Hansjörg Probst (Hrsg.): Mannheim vor der Stadtgründung. Teil II Band 1. Regensburg 2006, ISBN 3-7917-2019-8.
- Stadt Mannheim, Michael Caroli, Ulrich Nieß (Hrsg.): Geschichte der Stadt Mannheim. Band 1: 1607–1801. Ubstadt-Weiher 2007, ISBN 978-3-89735-470-8.
- Reiner Albert, Günther Saltin: Katholisches Leben in Mannheim. Band 1: Von den Anfängen bis zur Säkularisation (1803). Ostfildern 2009, ISBN 978-3-7995-0908-4.
- Stefanie Krause: Der Mannheimer Hochaltar von Paul Egell. Überlegungen zur Rezeption römischer Basreliefs und Wandretabel im frühen 18. Jahrhundert, in: Jahrbuch der Berliner Museen, N. F., Bd. 48, Berlin 2006, pp. 55–71.
- Stefanie Leibetseder: Johann Paul Egell (1691–1752). Der kurpfälzische Hofbildhauer und die Hofkunst seiner Zeit. Skulptur – Ornament – Relief (=Studien zur internationalen Architektur- und Kunstgeschichte, 96), Diss. phil. Petersberg 2013.
- Stefanie Leibetseder: „Schmuck der Kurpfalz“: Neue Quellen zur Herkunft und Genealogie von Paul Egell (1691–1752), in: Kunstchronik, 67 (2014), H. 5, pp. 227–230.
