= Paul Egell =

German sculptor and plasterer

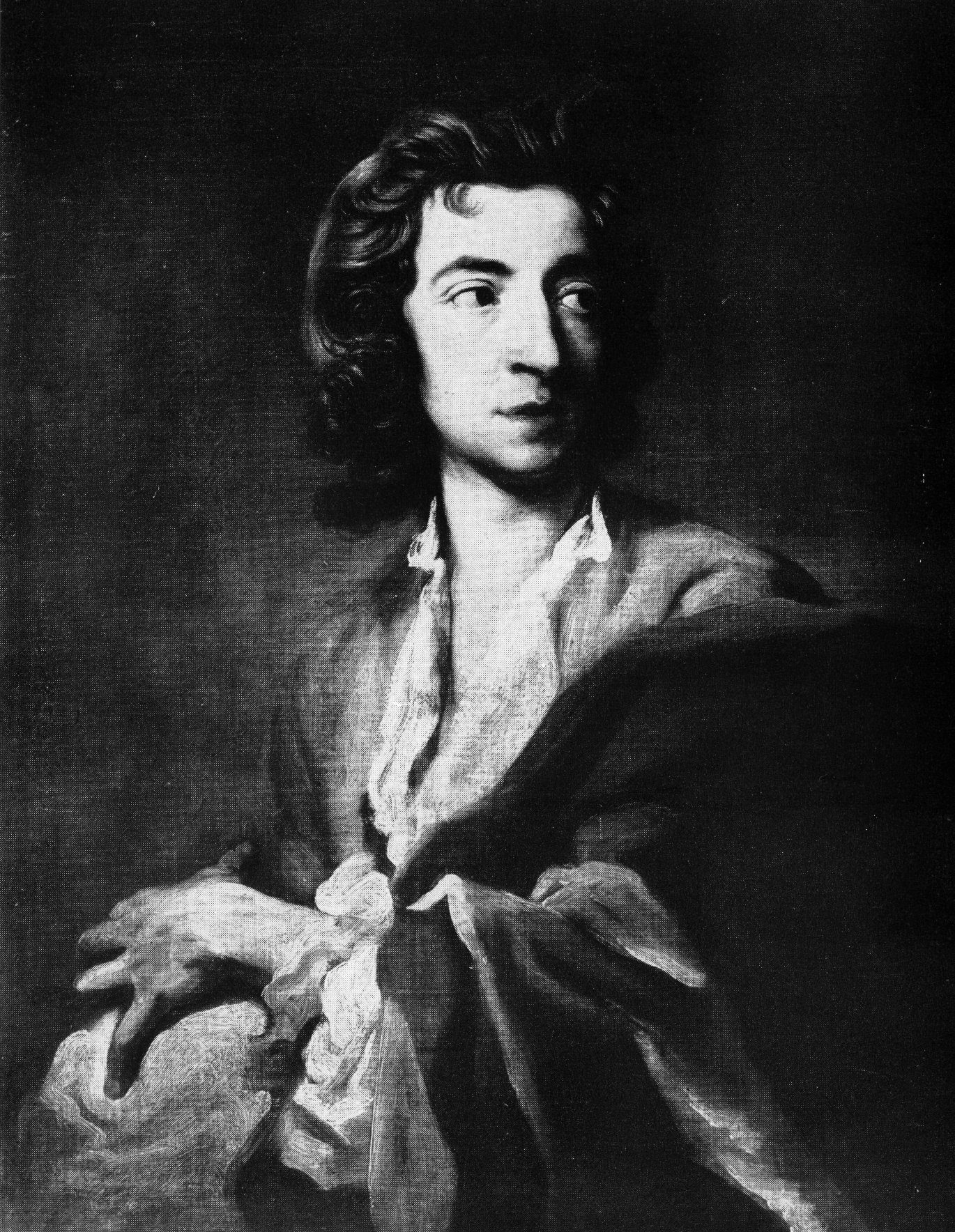
Paul Egell around 1730

Johann Paul Egell (April 9, 1691-Berlin, January 10, 1752) was a German sculptor and plasterer (stucco artist).

He was a pupil of Permoser in Dresden . In 1721 he was made court sculptor in Mannheim by Charles III Philip, Elector Palatine. In 1734-1735, Egell worked on behalf of the princes Anselm Franz von Thurn und Taxis in the construction of Palais Thurn und Taxis in Frankfurt. The Baroque city castle was destroyed by 1944 aerial bombing during World War II. Fragments remain. Of his works still remaining are stucco reliefs in the Mannheim Palace, masks at the Castle Hotel, pediment reliefs on the Castle Church and the Jesuit church, and design of the local silver Madonna and of the organ. Shortly before Egell’s death he had completed the design for the Chinese Pavilion in Oggersheim. It was completed by his son Augustin Egell. Among his pupils was Ignaz Günther. Egell was replaced in 1752 by Peter Anton von Verschaffelt.
