= Augustaanlage =

Street in Mannheim, Germany

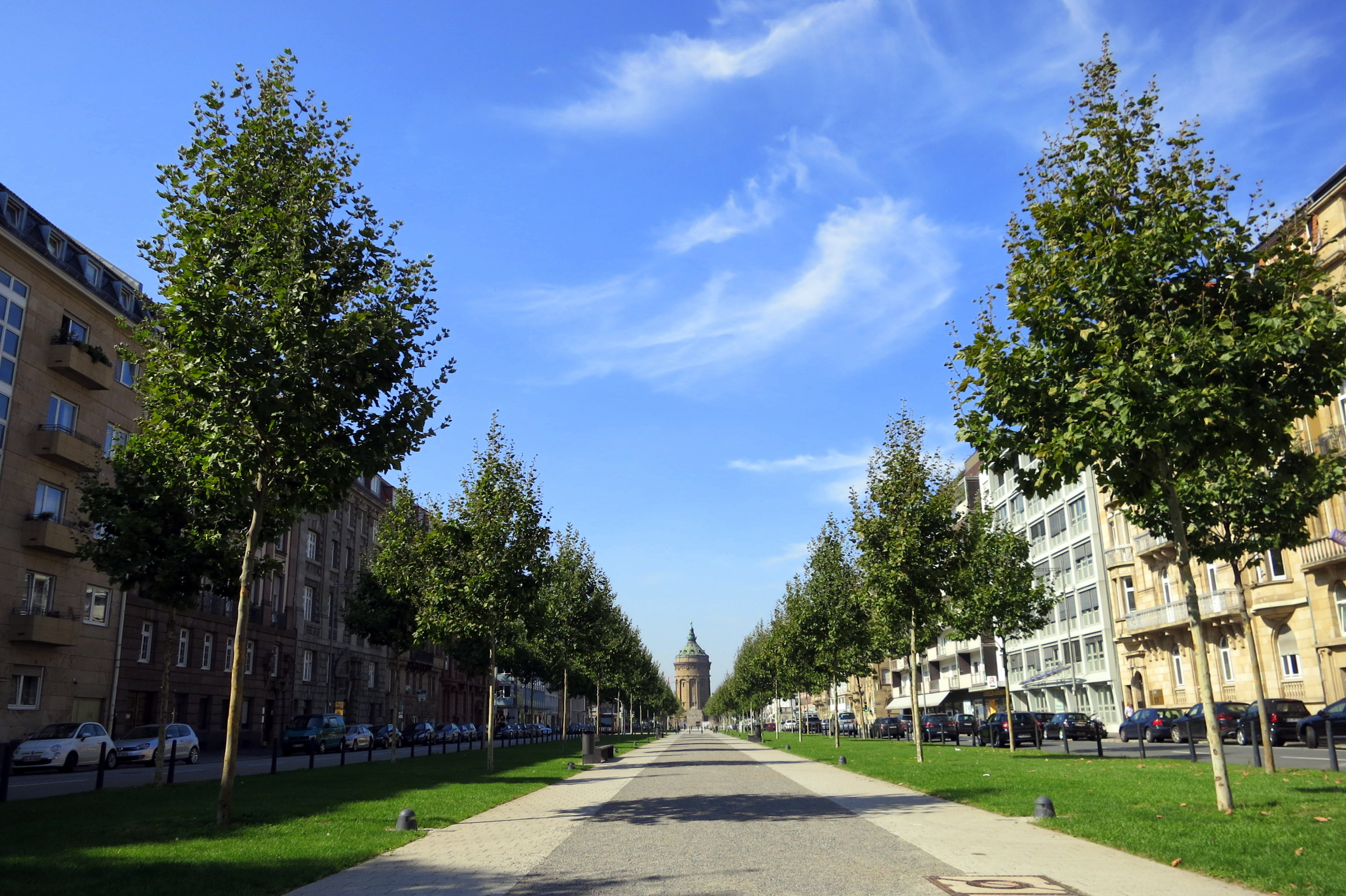
Augustaanlage, view into town

The Augustaanlage (German pronunciation: [aʊˈɡʊstaʔanˌlaːɡə]) is a four-lane street in Mannheim that has been developed as an avenue and connects the Mannheim downtown via the Bundesstraße 37 with the Bundesautobahn 656 in the east as a main axis.

== Course ==
The Augustaanlage runs between Friedrichsplatz with the Mannheim Water Tower and the city entrance at Europaplatz near the Mannheim Planetarium Mannheim. As an eastern entrance and exit road, it leads the traffic coming from the Bundesautobahn 656 via the Bundesstraße 37 from the direction of Heidelberg through the Oststadt into the city center and vice versa.

== History ==
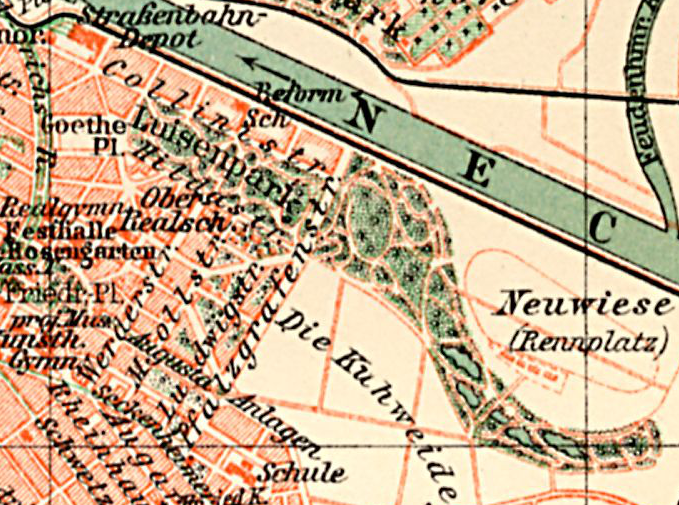
City map section from 1905 with the beginnings of the Augustaanlage

The Augustaanlage was named after the German Empress and Queen of Prussia, Augusta of Saxe-Weimar-Eisenach. The part adjacent to the Friedrichsplatz was built in the first years after 1900. The development took place from the city to the east, the house numbers run accordingly. The avenue, planted with plane trees in two rows on a wide central strip, was laid out in the jubilee year 1907 (300 years of the city of Mannheim) for the Internationale Kunst- und großen Gartenbau-Ausstellung. With increasing development of the Oststadt, the street was extended eastward to its current length by the end of the 1920s. In 1935, the Reichsautobahn Mannheim-Heidelberg, today the Bundesautobahn 656, was reopened in the extension.

The initial spelling with hyphen (Augusta-Anlage) remained for decades and was only adapted to spelling in 1980 as Augustaanlage.

Starting in spring 2011, the green space was partially redesigned with a continuous central walkway. The old sycamore trees were felled in several construction phases and replaced by 228 young trees by summer 2014, after most of the more than one hundred year old sycamore trees were affected by the fungal disease Massaria and could no longer be preserved. Financing was provided by a three-year fundraising campaign. The redesigned facility was inaugurated in mid-May 2015.

In 2016, the street was transformed into an open-air exhibition called Allee der Innovationen (avenue of innovations) in which many inventions made in Mannheim were shown.
