= Emperor William National Monument =

Former monument in Berlin

Coordinates: 52°30′59″N 13°24′00″E

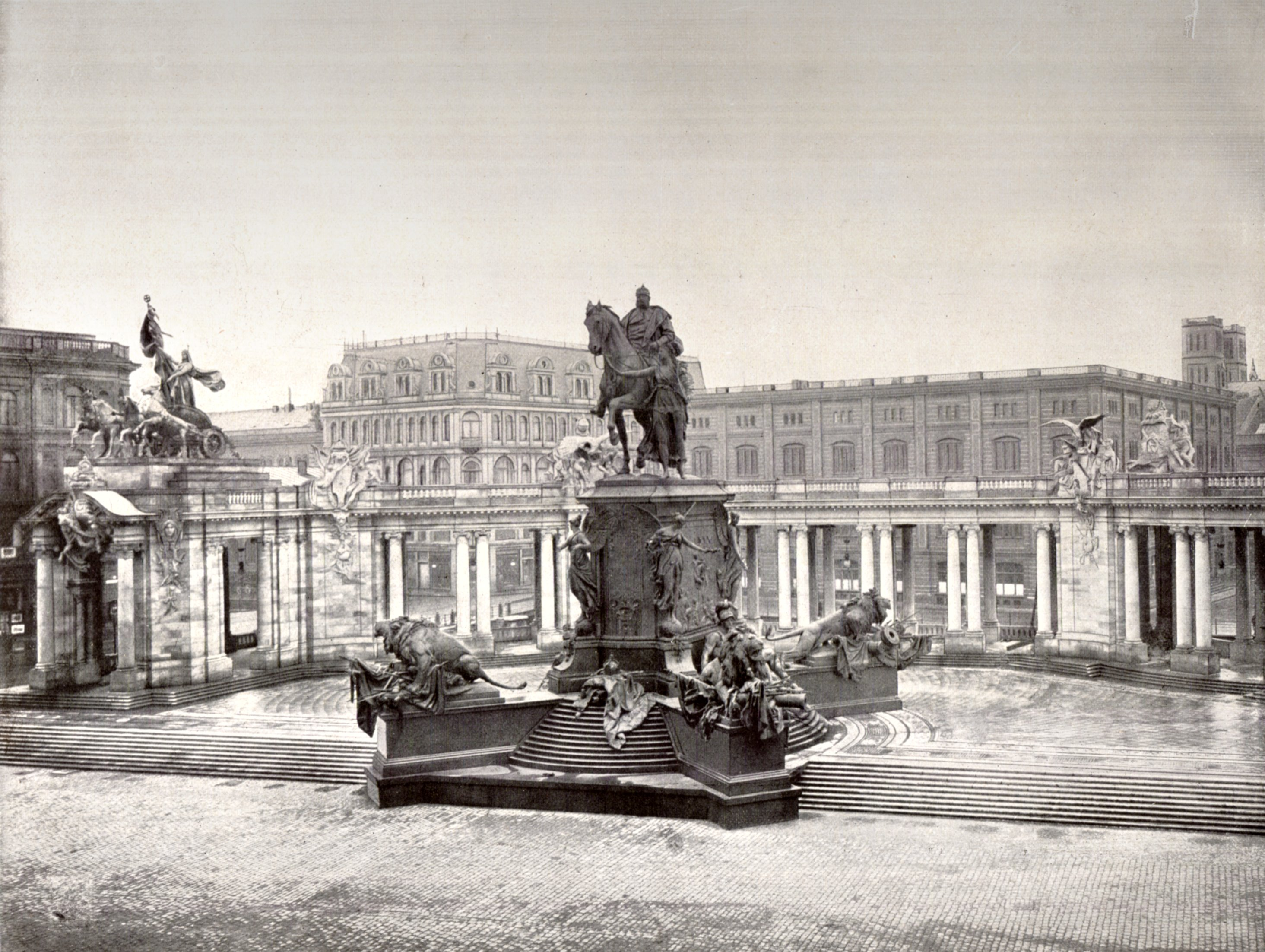
The Emperor William National Monument in 1900

The Emperor William National Monument (German: Kaiser-Wilhelm-Nationaldenkmal) was a memorial structure in Berlin dedicated to William I (Wilhelm I), first Emperor of Imperial Germany. It stood in front of the Berlin Palace from 1897 to 1950, when both structures were demolished by the government of the German Democratic Republic.

The monument was in the Baroque Revival style and featured an imposing equestrian statue of William I by the sculptor Reinhold Begas, who had also designed the Siegesallee and the Bismarck Memorial in the Tiergarten. The memorial was commissioned by William I's grandson, Wilhelm II, and was erected in front of the Eosander Portal on the west side of the Berlin Palace.

The planned Monument to Freedom and Unity is to be located on the base originally constructed for the monument.

== Competitions and the intervention of the Emperor ==
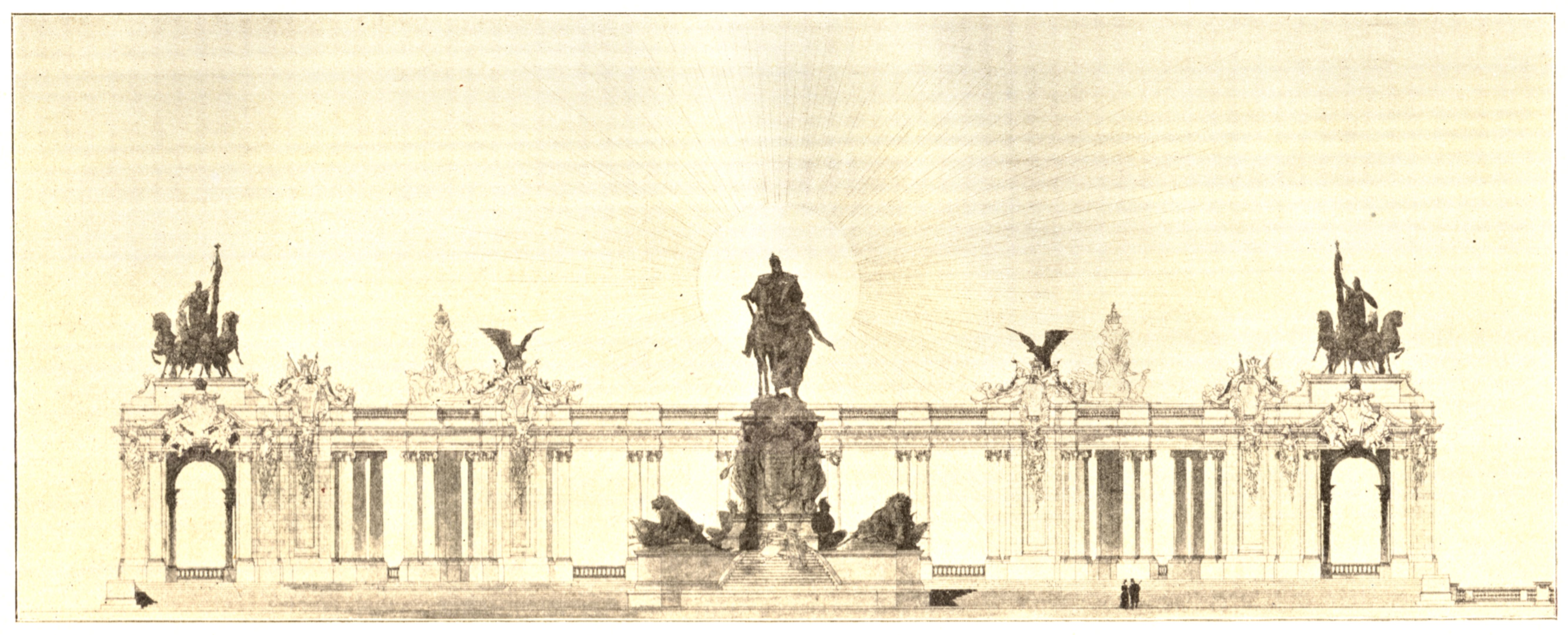
Architectural design by Gustav Halmhuber

After the death of Wilhelm I in the Year of Three Emperors (1888) an open competition for the establishment of a national monument in his memory was tendered the next year. The first competition, in which the "Imperial Forum" entry by architect Bruno Schmitz was chosen as the winner, did not bring the desired results. So in 1891 a second, limited bid was tendered to only eight selected artists.

Wilhelm II, who commissioned the monument, insisted that one of the eight be Reinhold Begas, one of his favorite artists, even though his proposal had not been one of those preferred in the first competition. Begas also had the advantage of knowing that the Emperor wished to site the monument on the west side of the palace, beside the Spree Canal, replacing houses on the so-called Schloßfreiheit; most other artists envisaged placement of the monument in front of the Brandenburg Gate. Begas' design was selected. Sculptor Wilhelm von Rümann and his students were contracted to assist with creating the statues for the memorial design. The architectural part of the design was by the Stuttgart architect Gustav Halmhuber.

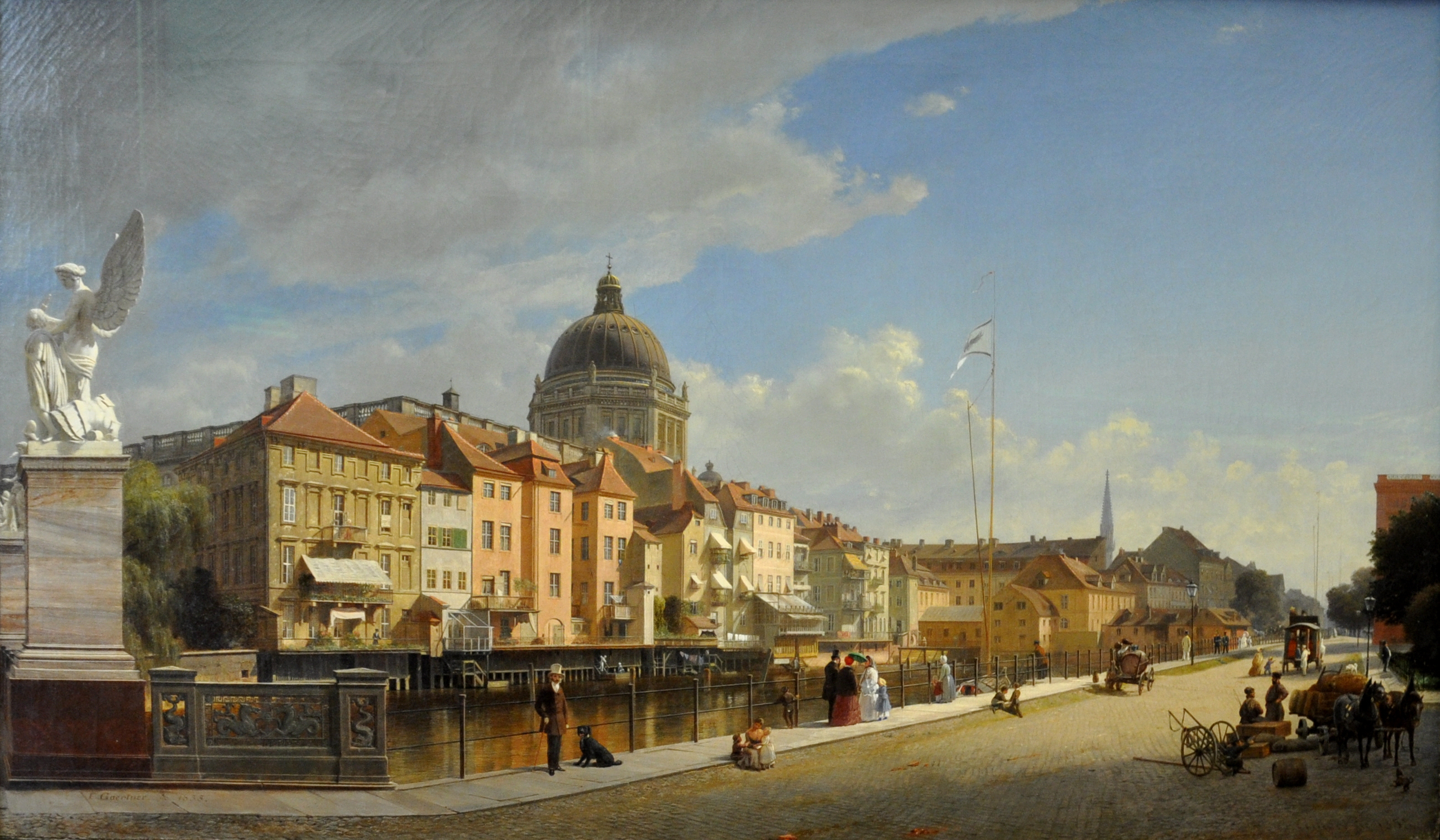
The Schloßfreiheit, site of the monument, in 1855

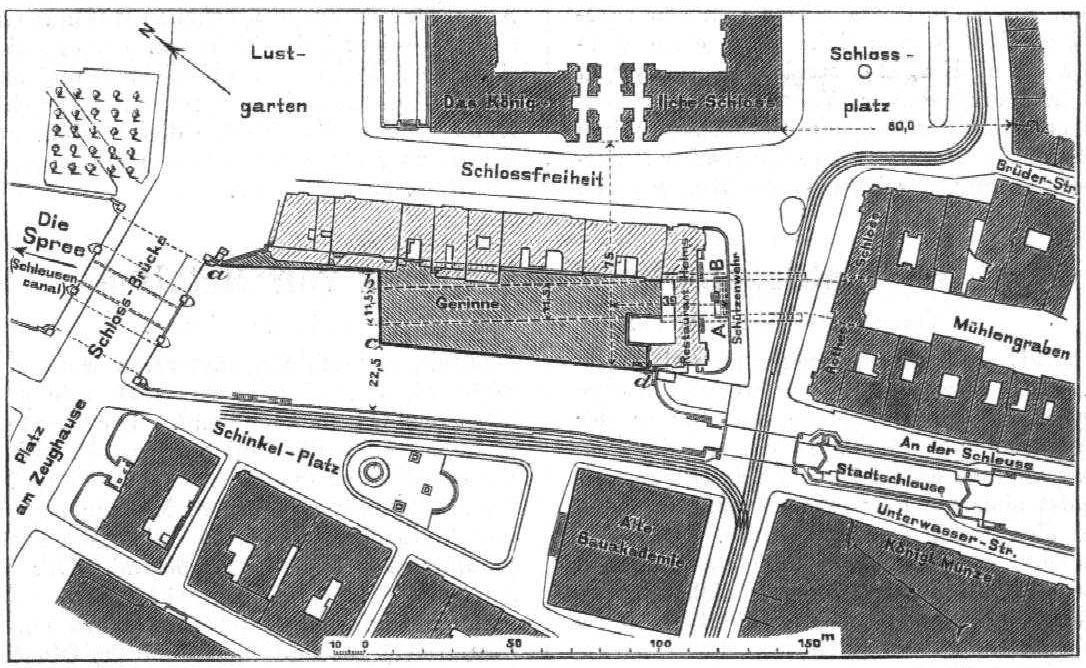
Schloßfreiheit with houses on a map, 1890

In June 1894, construction began with the demolition of the houses that lined the street between the canal and the Eosander Portal of the Berlin Palace. The foundation stone for the memorial was laid on August 18, 1895, the 25th anniversary of the Battle of Gravelotte, and the monument was inaugurated on the 100th anniversary of Wilhelm I's birth, March 22, 1897, during a ten-day centennial celebration. The construction cost was four million marks, a considerable sum when compared with the soon to be built Altes Stadthaus, which would cost seven million marks.

== Description ==
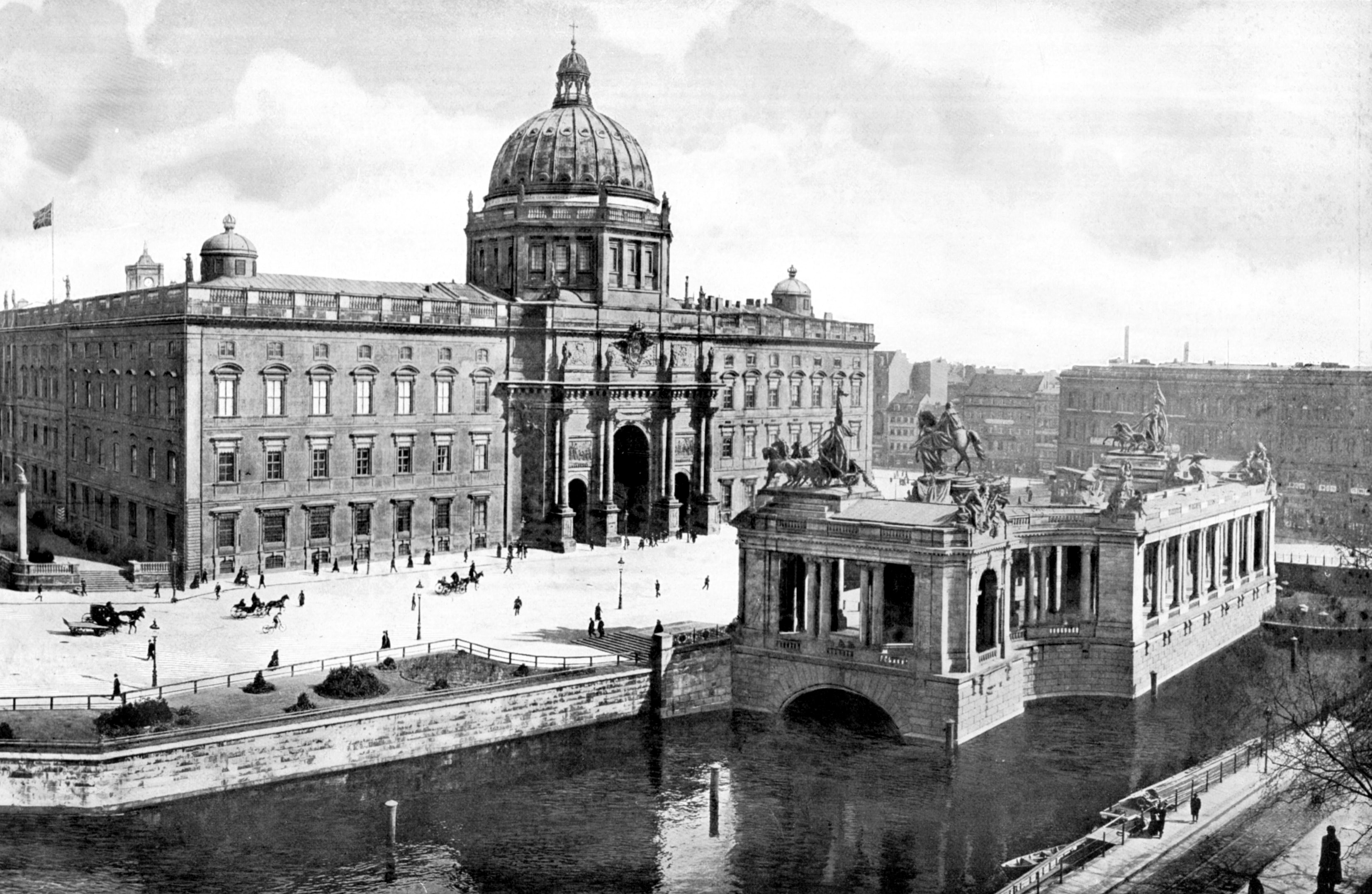
Berlin Palace and the monument around 1900

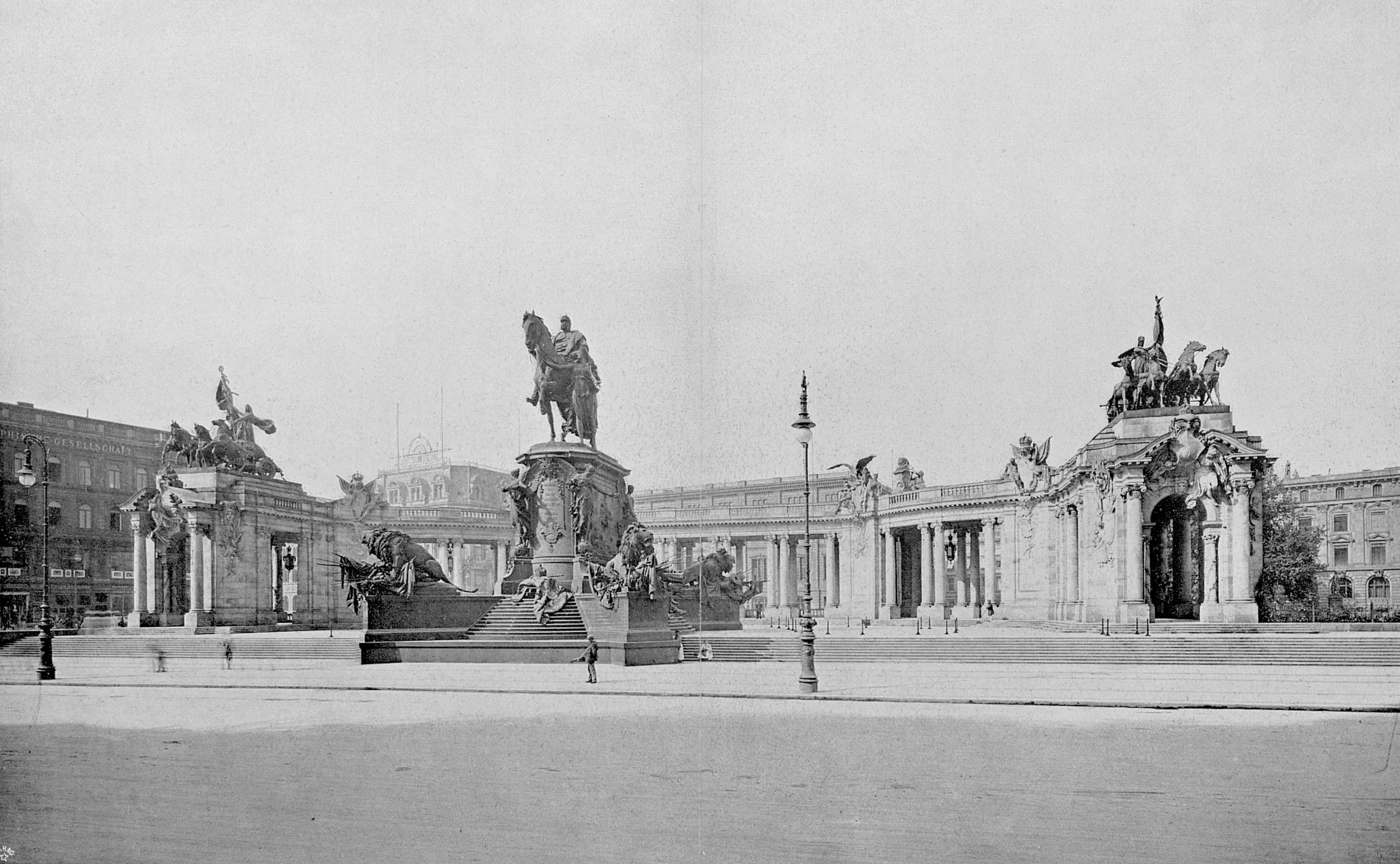
The monument in 1901

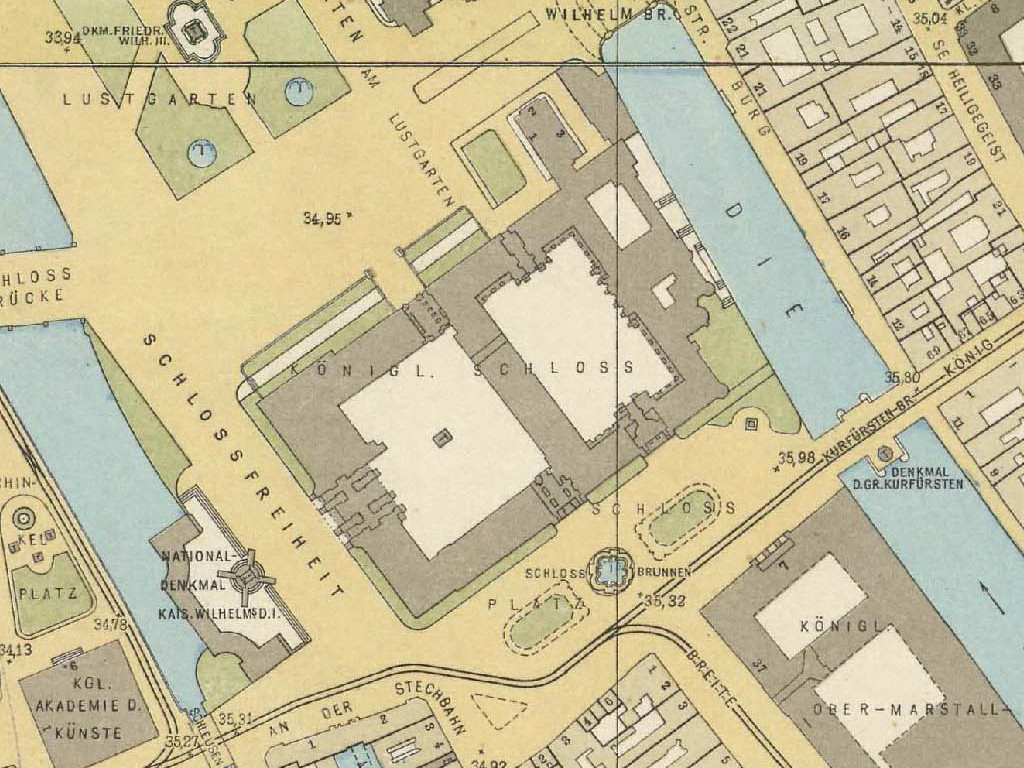
Schloßfreiheit with monument (left) and surroundings on a map, 1910

The focal point of the 21-meter-high (69 ft) monument was the 9-meter-high (30 ft) equestrian statue of the Emperor, to the left accompanied by a female representation of Peace holding the reins of his horse. The statue was oriented to face the Eosander Portal (Portal III), which was the main entrance of the Berlin Palace. This followed a similar pattern of older statues around the palace, such as the monument of the Great Elector on the Elector Bridge, which was aligned to face toward the palace's Portal I, and the monument to William I's father, King Frederick William III in the Lustgarten, which was aligned with the palace's Portal IV.

At the corners of the statue's bronze pedestal, four Goddesses of Victory floated on spheres. At the front, the pedestal bore the inscription "William the Great, German Emperor, King of Prussia 1861-1888" and on the back was the inscription "in gratitude and true love, the German people". On the granite steps of the substructure on the north was a colossal statue of War and to the south one of Peace, created by Eugen Boermel. On four projections from the base of the pedestal were four guardian lion statues. The design was mockingly known by the nickname Wilhelm in the lions' den. This alluded to the compositional appeal of the central figure in a semicircle, which was similar to Briton Rivière's recent painting Daniel's Answer to the King.

The entire memorial complex stood on a raised base of polished red granite from Sweden. This raised platform was nine steps up from the sidewalk and was suitable for national celebrations of all kinds.

The equestrian statue was enclosed at the rear and sides by a sandstone colonnade formed by coupled Ionic columns, which terminated in two corner pavilions. To emphasize the terraced rise of the square even more, the hall was increased in height by four meters. Only the pavilions were massive; the open colonnade afforded a good view on all sides of the statue and the palace beyond. Within the colonnade, the ground was paved in sandstone mosaic.

On the ledge of the front, four groups of figures embodied the Kingdoms of Prussia (by Peter Breuer), Bavaria (by August Gaul), Saxony (by August Kraus), and Württemberg (by Peter Christian Breuer). At the rear facing the Spree, four groups represented trade and shipping (by Ludwig Cauer), art (by Hermann Hidding), science (by Karl Begas), and agriculture and industry (by Ludwig Cauer). The southern pavilion was crowned by the bronze quadriga of Bavaria, the work of Karl Hans Bernewitz. The counterpart on the northern pavilion was a quadriga representing Borussia, created by John Goetz.

== Later history and removal ==
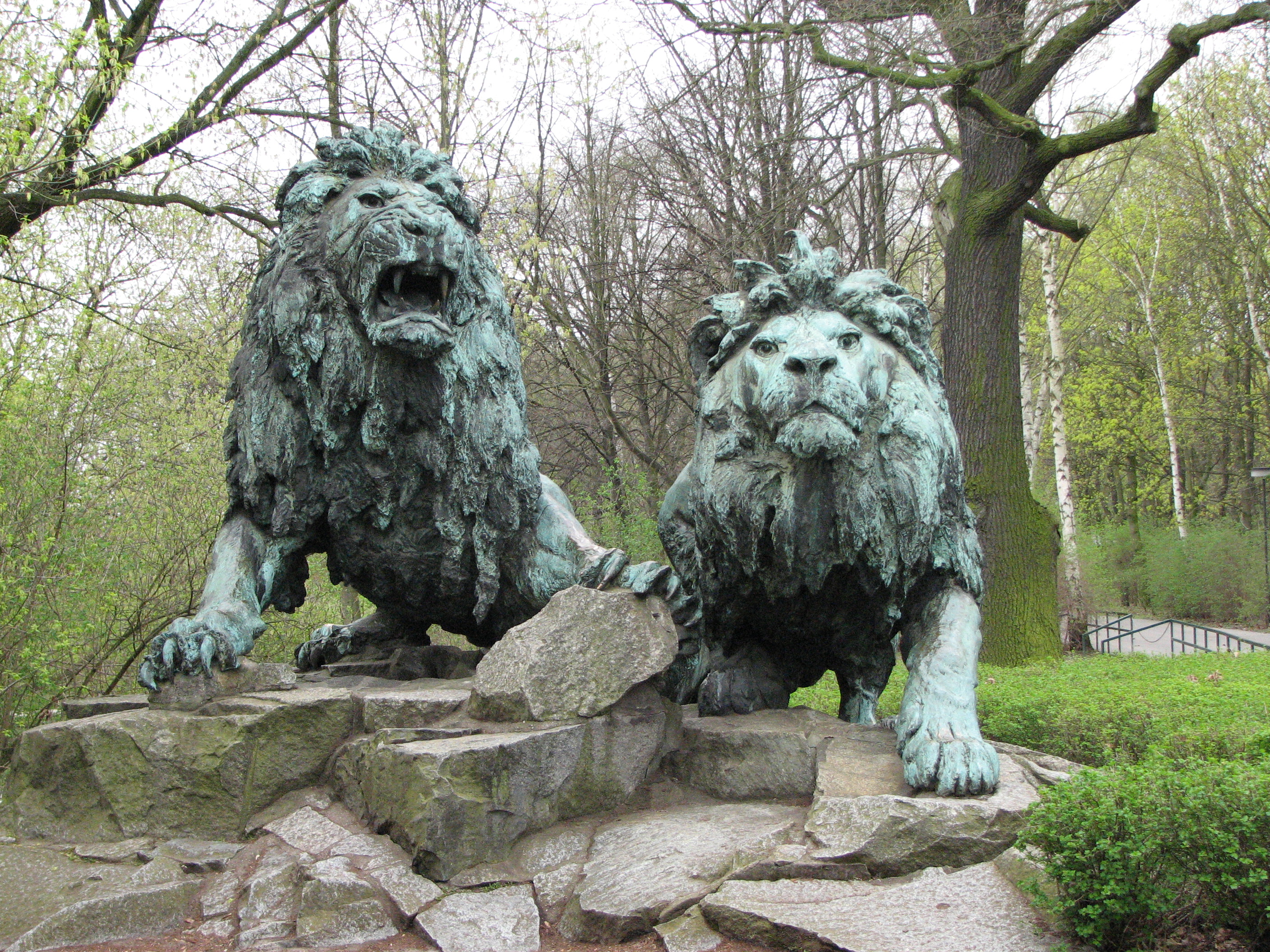
Two lions from the monument, at the Berlin Zoo

During the November Revolution of 1918, parts of the monument were damaged. During the early days of the Weimar Republic the government decided to restore the monument instead of removing it. The monument came through the Second World War relatively undamaged. In the winter of 1949–50, the Socialist Unity Party, the ruling party of East Germany, decided to demolish the monument. The demolition was politically motivated, as was the case a short time later with the decision to demolish the City Palace. The base still exists today on the southwestern edge of the palace square and is a listed building. The mosaic paving is covered by a layer of asphalt. A jetty that was used by canal barges also survives. Ventilation shafts there make it possible to reach the vaulted under-structure of the monument by ladder, and graffiti artists have vandalized the space.

The four lions survived and now are on display outside the lion house at the Berlin Zoo. In addition, one remaining eagle by August Gaul is now owned by the Märkisches Museum.
