= New Town Hall (Hanover) =

Town hall in Hanover, Germany

- Neues Rathaus
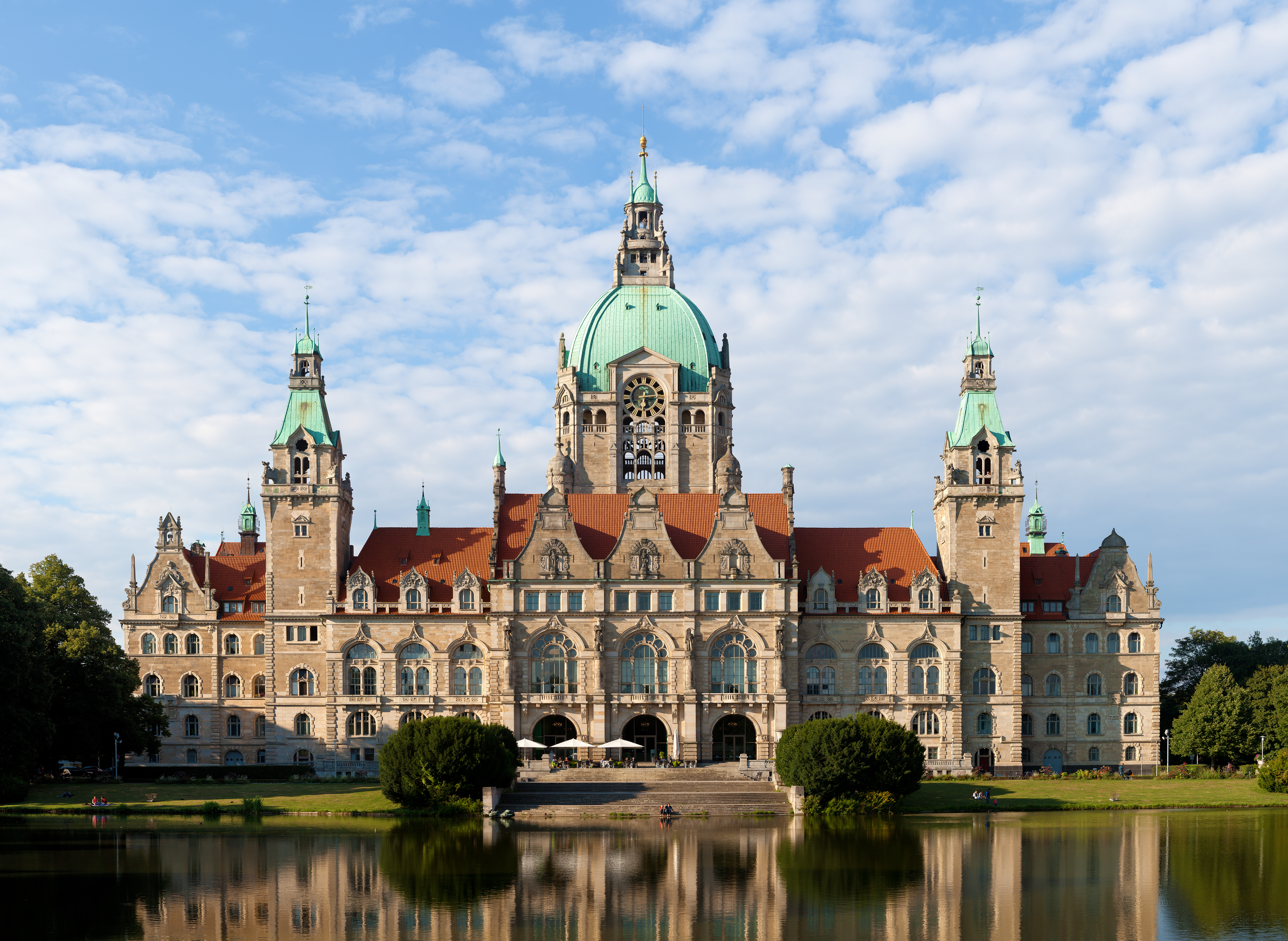
- The main frontage of the town hall in August 2013

General information
- Architectural style: Eclectic style
- Location: Platz der Menschenrechte 1, Hanover, Germany
- Coordinates: 52.367249°N 9.737355°E
- Construction started: 1901; 125 years ago
- Opened: 1913; 113 years ago

Height
- Height: 97.73 m (320.6 ft)

Technical details
- Floor area: 8,700 m^{2} (94,000 sq ft)

Design and construction
- Architects: Hermann Eggert; Gustav Halmhuber

The New Town Hall (German: Neues Rathaus) is a town hall in Hanover, Germany. It opened on 20 June 1913 after construction lasting 12 years. A magnificent, castle-like building of the era of Wilhelm II in eclectic style at the southern edge of the inner city just outside the historic city centre of Hanover, the building is embedded within the 10-hectare (25-acre) Maschpark. The New Town Hall remains the residence of the Mayor and CEO, the head of the municipal administration.

== History ==
The New Town Hall was commissioned to replace the Wangenheim Palace, which had become the main seat of administration, after the city council moved from the Old Town Hall in 1862. It was designed by architects Hermann Eggert and Gustav Halmhuber in the eclectic style, built in ashlar stone at a cost of 10 million marks and was officiallly opened on 20 June 1913.

The poor state of the ground meant that the building had to be constructed using 6,026 beech piles. "Ten million marks, Your Majesty – and all paid for in cash", the City Director, Heinrich Tramm, is claimed to have announced when the New Town Hall was opened in the presence of Emperor Wilhelm II.

The building was damaged during allied bombing raids on the inner city of Hanover in the Second World War and subsequently restored. The German state of Lower Saxony was proclaimed in the main hall in 1946.

The mayor, Herbert Schmalstieg, and City Director, Hinrich Lehmann-Grube, launched the Freundeskreis Hannover (Friends of Hanover Association) in the building in 1988.

On 23 September 2024, the public space in front of the town hall, which had been named Trammplatz (lit. 'Tramm Plaza') in honour of Tramm, was renamed to Platz der Menschenrechte (lit. 'Human Rights Plaza') because Tramm was found to have been as a pioneer of National Socialism.

== Description ==
The design involves a symmetical main frontage of 19 bays facing onto the park. The central section of three bays is arcaded with three round-headed openings on the ground floor, three large round-headed windows on the first floor and three tripartite windows on the second floor with stepped gables above. The central section is flanked by three-bay connecting sections and, beyond that, there are square towers and then end sections which are also surmounted by stepped gables. Behind the central section there is a huge dome which, with its observation platform, is 97.73 metres (320.6 ft) high. Internally, the principal room is the main hall which is 38 metres (125 ft) high .

The dome's lift is unique in the world in that its arched course follows the parabolic shape of the dome. It is often incorrectly described as a sloping lift up the dome and compared with the lifts in the Eiffel Tower, which actually travel diagonally only, without changing their angle of inclination. The lift climbs the 50-metre (160 ft) shaft at an angle of up to 17° to the gallery of the dome, where the Harz mountain range can be seen when visibility is good. In the process, the lift moves 10 metres (33 ft) horizontally. During the trip, the two weight-bearing cables wind up on three double rolls in the wall of the shaft. A new lift was installed in April 2008.

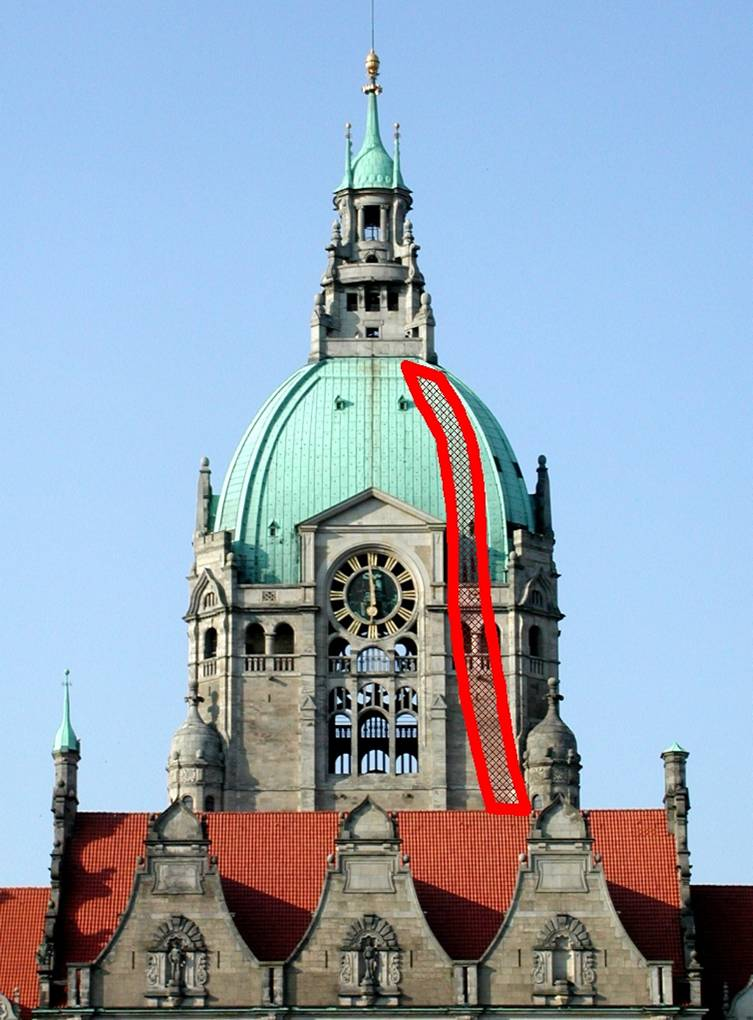
Town hall dome showing the elevator route (in red)

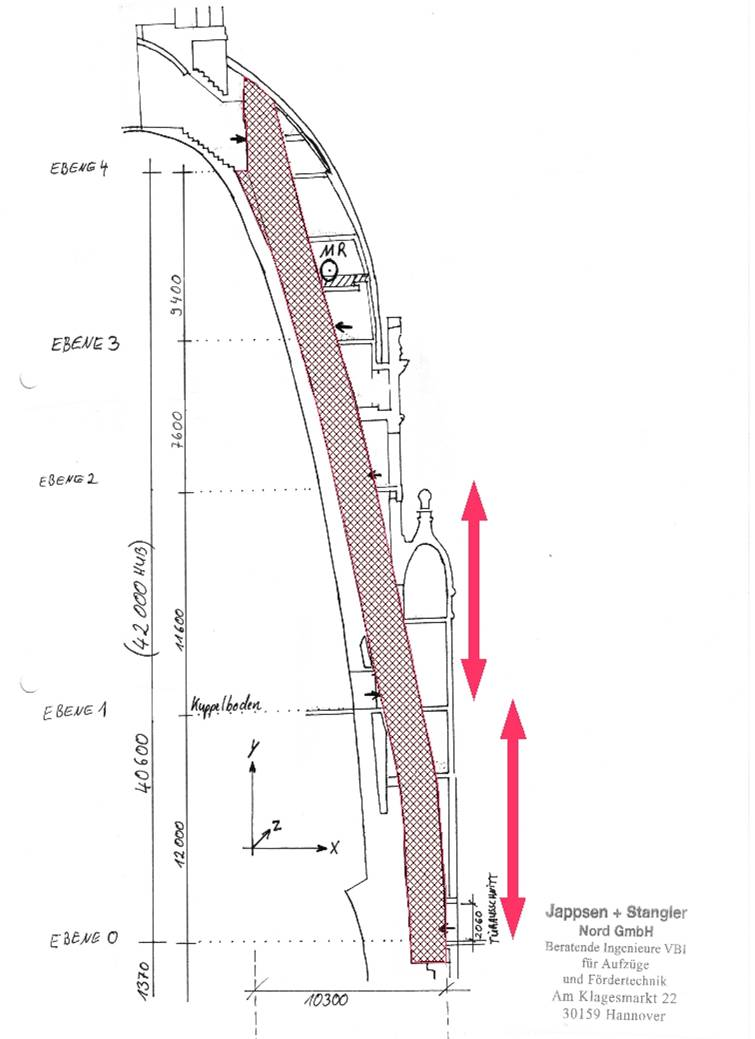
Plan of the elevator route in the dome

== Gallery ==
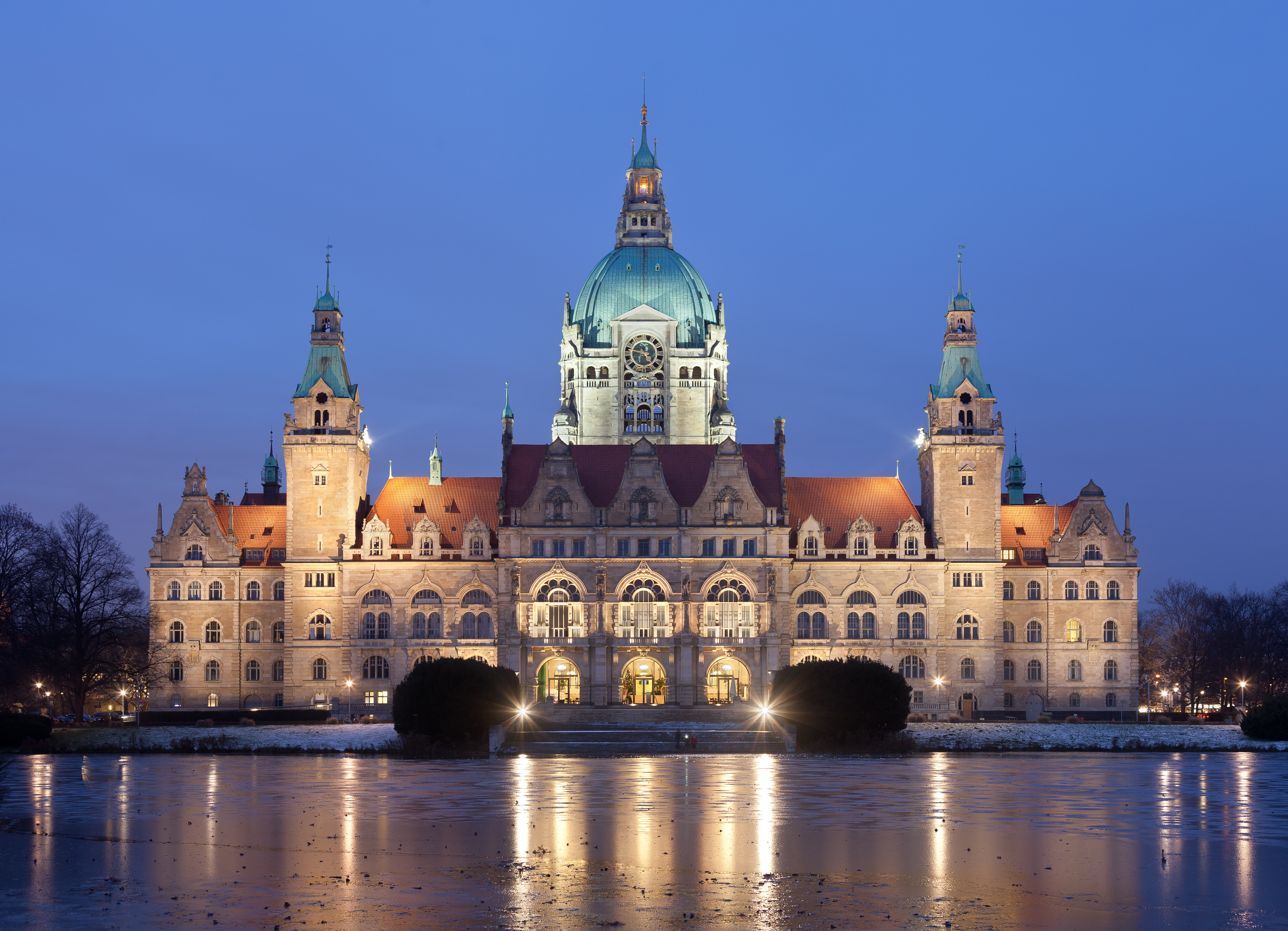
Hanover's New Town Hall at night

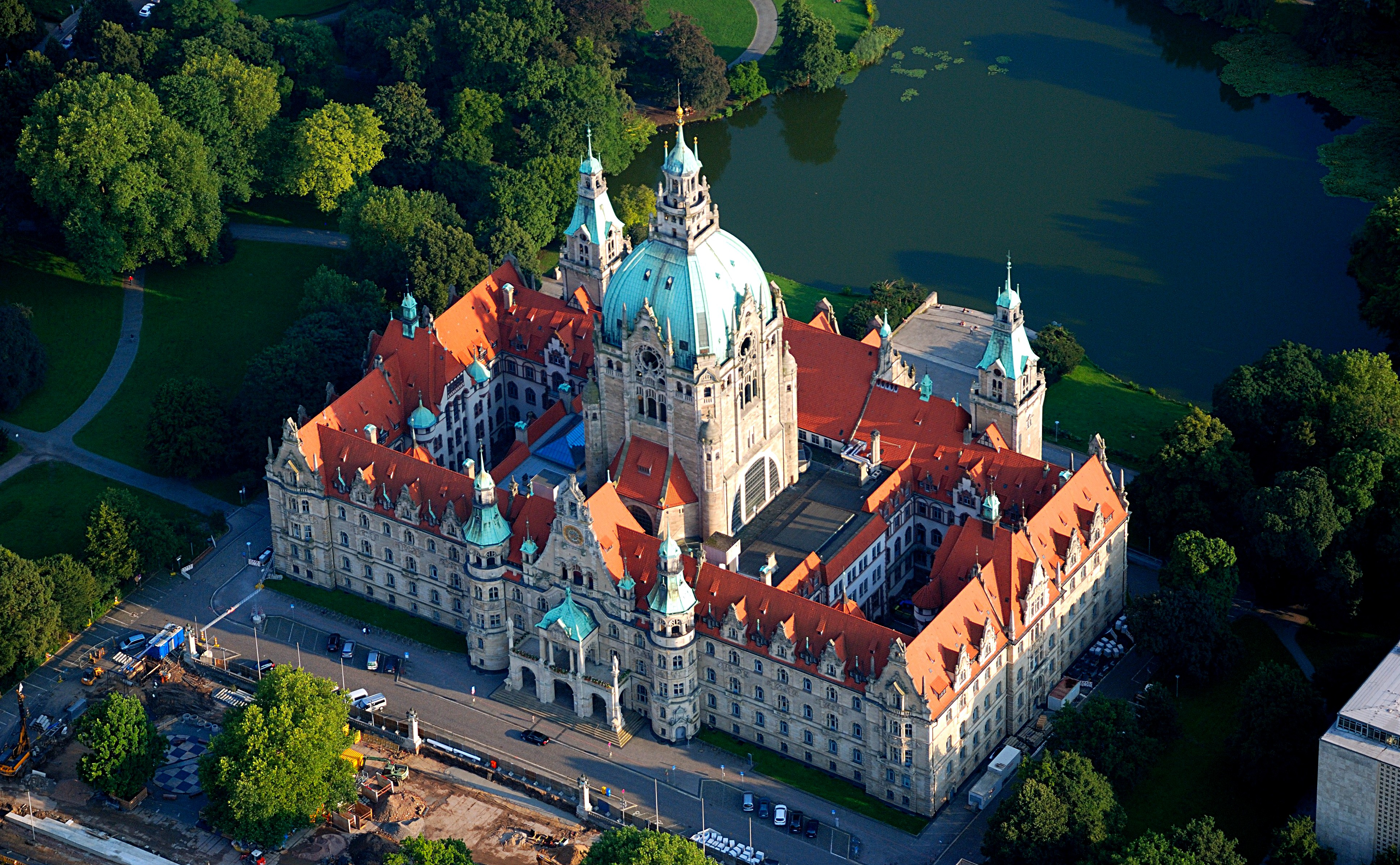
Aerial view

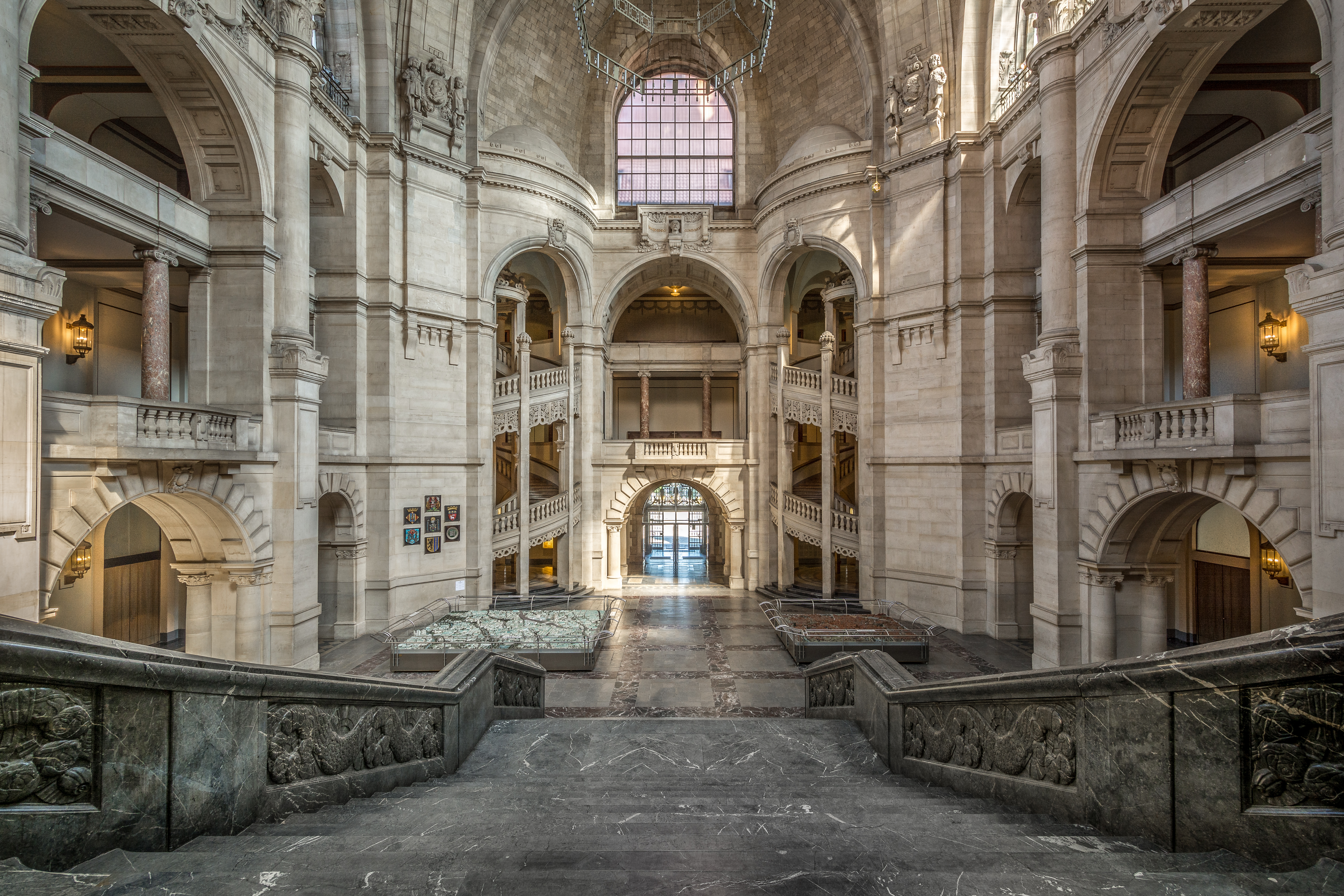
Interior
