= Mannheim Water Tower =

Water tower in Mannheim, Germany

Coordinates: 49°29′03″N 8°28′32″E

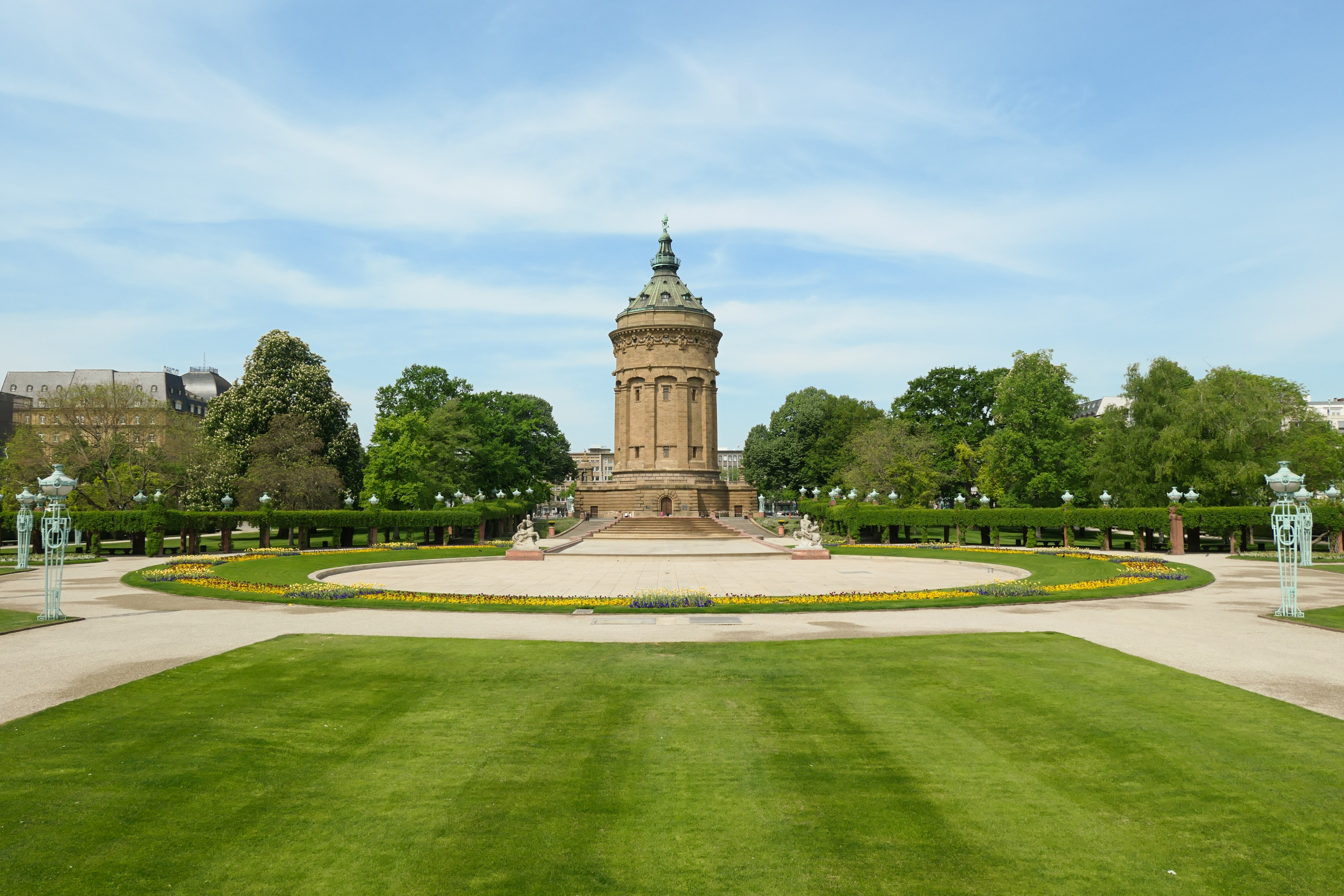
Mannheim Water Tower

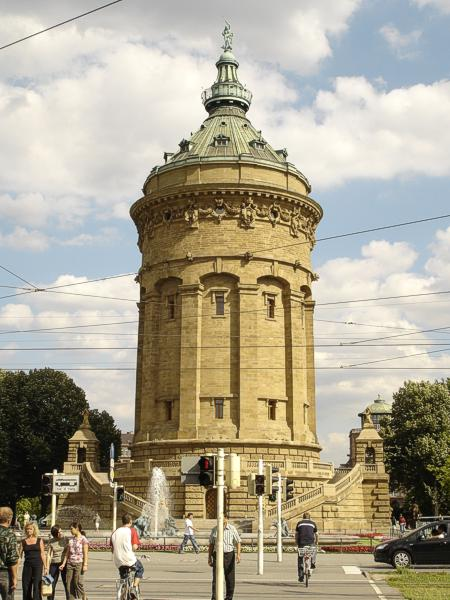
Mannheim Water Tower

The Water Tower (German: Wasserturm) is a well-known landmark of Mannheim, Germany. The water tower was built from 1886 to 1889 on the present Frederick Square (Friedrichsplatz) by Gustav Halmhuber. The tower, which is 60 meters high and 19 meters in diameter, was Mannheim's first urban water tower. It initially had to meet with the required standards as a drinking water supply while maintaining steady water pressure. After the construction of the higher Luzenberg water tower in 1909, the Mannheim water tower served as an aboveground water tank until 2000.

== History ==
=== Early history ===
Since Mannheim lies on the Rhine Valley, the groundwater is not very deep under the earth's surface and is therefore often of poor quality. Consequently, during the reign of Elector Charles Louis (1680), the merchant Helferich Geil suggested channeling "mountain water from Rohrbach" (now a district of Heidelberg) to Mannheim. Until the 19th century, the electoral court's water requirements were met by The Upper and Lower Prince Fountains at the Heidelberg Castle. In 1798, Johann Andreas of Traitteur, the Electoral Palatinate architect, wrote about these water transports:

"Because of the lack of healthy, acceptable well water, as long as the court was in Mannheim, such necessary water was brought in daily from the mountains. As is well known, the court chamber had to keep a special water truck which drove to Heidelberg everyday to collect water from the Prince Fountain in the castle courtyard."

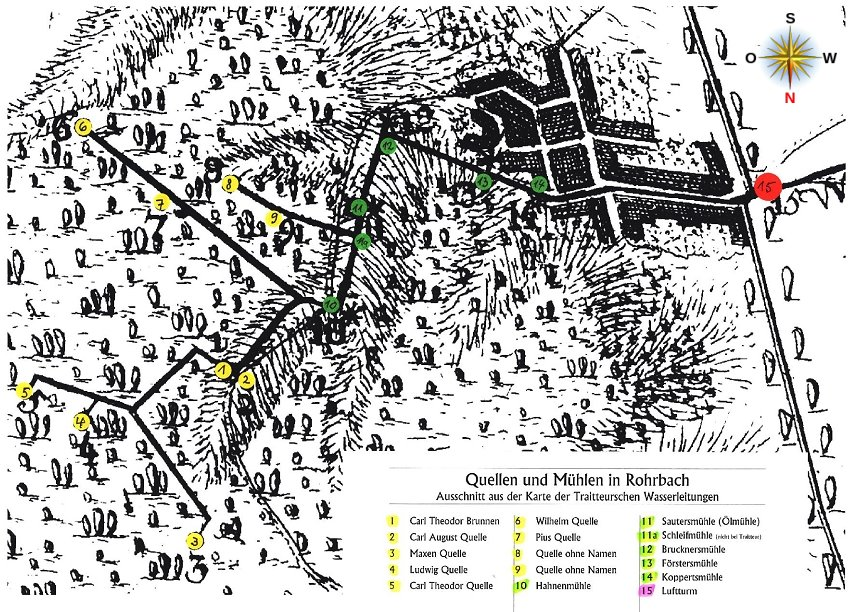
Springs and Watermills in Rohrbach (Heidelberg)

In 1739, the minister of Hildesheim had eight fountains built on Parade Square. The architect Bibiena of Rohrbach was supposed to solve the problem of water shortage. However, he could no longer carry out this work. For more than 60 years, these fountains were without water and the citizens of Mannheim were faced with constant ridicule.

In 1758, the scientifically trained Jesuit Christian Mayer was sent to France to inspect all the water lines there. After his return, Father Mayer wrote a lot about hydraulics, but not a single water pipe was built.

In 1770, Mannsperger, the cooper master of Mannheim, suggested that water from Rohrbach be channeled to Mannheim via wineskin (formerly called Kieferschlauch, or pine hose). His suggestion was considered insane and was rejected by a commission of the city council because it could not be completed with 200,000 guilders.

In 1771, "Master Besinger" wanted to use a "barrel machine" (scoop wheel) to scoop the water from the Rhine River into the fortress ditches. The guilds, consisting of boatmen, protested against this plan. In the meantime, four new fountains had been constructed on the market square; however, the water necessary was still missing.

Experts from Bavaria were assigned to Mannheim and the Electoral Palatinate chief engineer, Steimich, was sought for advice. He calculated that it would cost 210,000 guilders in order to channel the flowing water from the Rhine through the fortress ditches. However, it would cost the same value to construct a water pipeline directly from Rohrbach to Mannheim. This and further plans were therefore denied by the Minister, Count Oberndorff.

Since 1790, over 24,000 residents of Mannheim mainly obtained their drinking water from pumping wells. In the hot summer months when most of the water was withdrawn, the water smelled of foul broth. The suspended solids in the water did not have to settle because of rapid withdrawal. Likewise, the fortress ditches spread a terrible stench due to the evaporation of the water after exposure and dehydration. A closed sewer system did not yet exist. There was a lack of rinsing water due to a drought, and waste, feces, etc. were left to rot on the street. During this time, this was the main cause of many illnesses, including typhus, which caused many Mannheim residents to die during the summer.

Benjamin Thompson, an American physicist from Massachusetts, prompted the Electoral Palatinate major and administrative councilor, Johann Andreas of Traitteur, to address the issue regarding the water supply. The turning point of the endless discussion was finally reached with the intervention of Traitteur. He examined the watercourses above Rohrbach and the waterways on the other side of the Neckar River. On June 20, 1790, Traitteur finally submitted his memorandum. He stated in this memorandum that within two years, he will channel water from the mountains near Rohrbach to Mannheim for drinking and domestic use in sufficient quantities in order to provide for twelve fountains, various public pipe fountains, the Mannheim Palace, and many private buildings. (A total of 54 wells were planned). Furthermore, Traitteur obliged to build the water line, in advance, at his own expense. Since Traitteur had claimed privileges, a commission met to deal with these provisions and imposed conditions on him (now there must be 130 wells), which forced Traitteur to change his plans. In the second contract signed on March 1, 1791, the engineer pledged to complete the water line by the end of 1792 because there was a celebration for the golden anniversary of Charles Theodore's reign.

In the end, Traitteur was forced to stop the work due to the lack of money (the outstanding "donation"—agreed advance or payment on account—of 30,000 guilders was not paid) and could not manage to comply to the terms of a third contract, although he had hired new workers to construct a stone quarry and two brick factories. The siege of Mannheim in 1795, however, put an end to all efforts. The French used the wooden pegs as firewood and the Austrians blocked out the duct for military reasons. In 1779, the court chamber stated that it was impossible to continue working on the water line. On March 22, 1798, a settlement was therefore reached between Traitteur and the chamber, whereby all previous contracts were cancelled and compensation was set for Traitteur in government bonds. However, these were not paid to him even after long trials.

The population of Mannheim grew rapidly towards the end of the 19th century, and as a consequence, the supply from the Käfertal waterworks was soon no longer sufficient. The city therefore needed its own water tower. The selected location was ideal, since only short lines were necessary for households in the center of the city to reach Schwetzingerstadt, Lindenhof, and the then-emerging Oststadt.

=== Construction ===
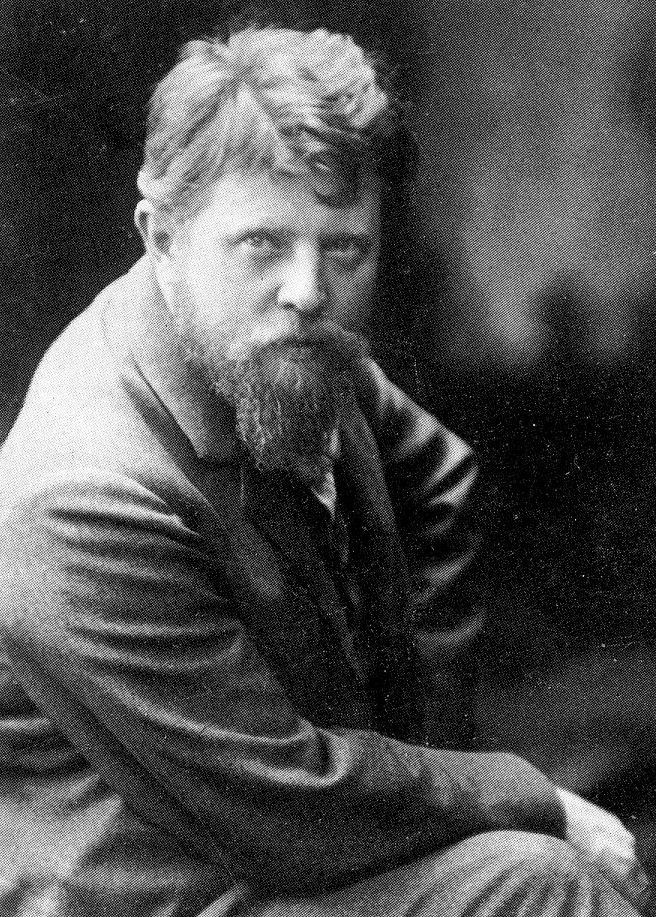
The architect of the water tower: Gustav Halmhuber, 1897

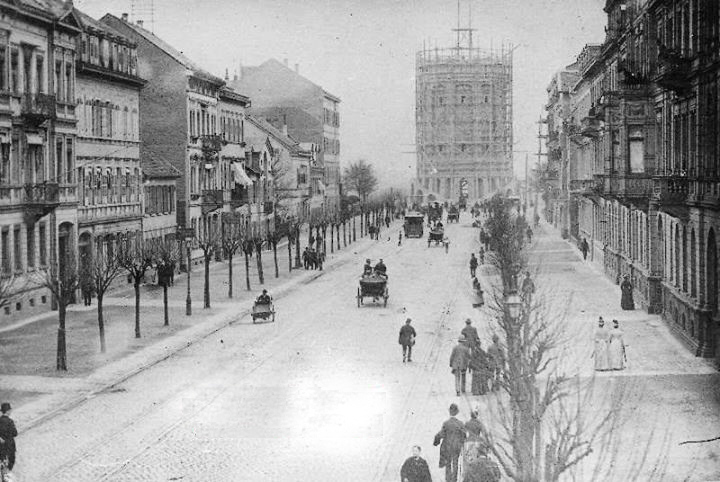
The water tower under construction, 1887 (from Mannheim's main shopping street)

On July 1, 1886, the groundbreaking ceremony for the construction of waterworks took place. 1.975 million marks was approved as a loan for the project. However, the costs rose to 2,374,288 marks in the course of the three-year construction phase. The construction of the actual water tower was what caused such an increase in the costs in building the waterworks. The building contractor Joseph Hoffman & Söhne in Ludwigshafen on the river Rhine, which also had a branch in Mannheim, was in charge of the construction work. They had to deposit a bail in the amount of 20,000 marks for this. However, the contractor apparently overlooked extending their bail, and they were immediately warned. The contractor was also behind schedule with the construction. On May 8, 1889, the construction management requested the contractor Joseph Hoffman & Söhne to complete all the work by May 10. Since the company had not fulfilled these requests, it now had to face consequences; the construction management now had hired "a corresponding number of sculptors for a daily allowance of 5.50 marks at your [the contractor's] expense".

Halmhuber was met with frustration with the construction company and could not move from Berlin to Mannheim; he no longer seemed interested in the Mannheim water tower. He sent an urgently requested plaster model of Frieze with Putti in poor packaging so that it arrived in Mannheim broken. He himself did not comply with several requests from the city to personally promote the construction. After he had sent further detailed plans for terraces and side turrets, which in the end deviated from his plans, he finally arrived in person in May 1888. The complete handover of all plans was delayed until October 1888. In the meantime, the city expansion following Friedrichsplatz had already begun to take shape and a first water fountain had been built on Friedrichplatz as well.

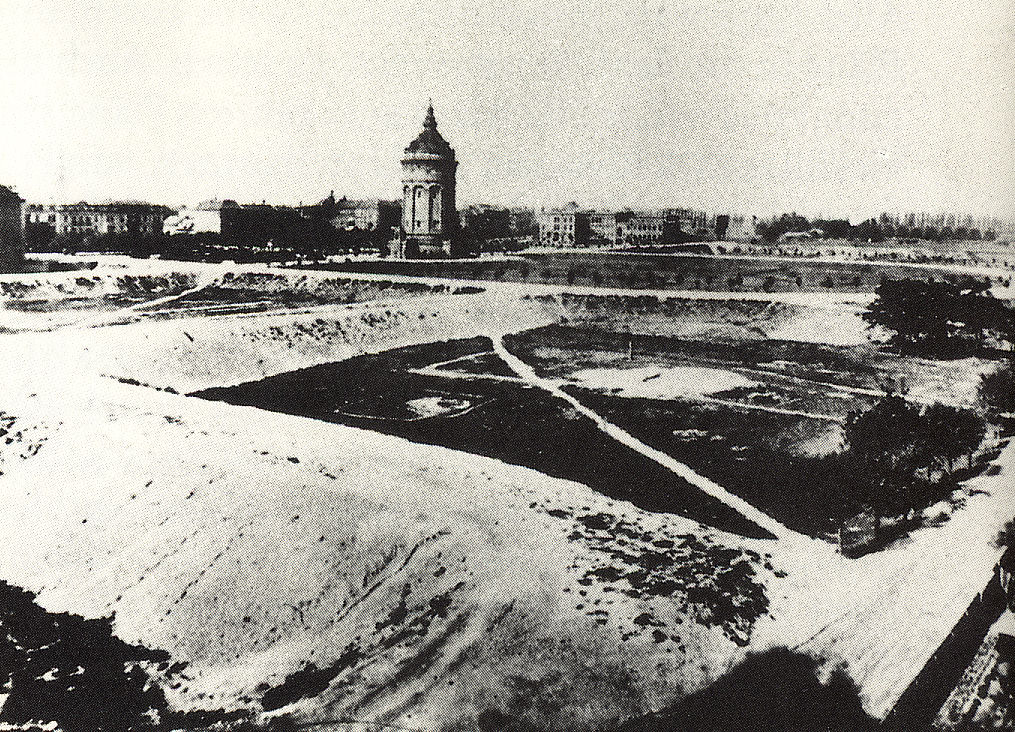
Terrain surrounding Mannheim water tower, 1889

On March 14, 1889, the tower was so far completed that the scaffolding could soon be removed. Once again, the city of Mannheim invited architects to take a tour. It is not known, however, whether Halmhuber returned to Mannheim.

The citizens of Mannheim were able to voluntarily register for access to the water supply from 1887. By the time the water tower was completed, there were only 2,263 waterline connections, with around 75,000 residents in the city. Even by 1900, only 5,170 connections were installed, although the population had risen to over 120,000 by then.

=== Destruction and reconstruction ===
The tower was badly hit during the bombing of Mannheim in World War II. The roof in particular was destroyed, but the water tank was comparatively easy to repair.

The Mannheim-dialect poet, Erna Rück, wrote in her poem called "Mei liewes Mannem" ("My Dear Mannheim"):

The water tower, the plank,

Everything is of dearth,

the heaviest hoarse voice sank

Like the dirt in the earth.

The tower only had a temporary roof until the 1950s. Since there was a sharp rise of water consumption due to the reconstruction of the destroyed Mannheim town center, it was necessary to increase the water pressure. The city therefore planned to raise the volume of the water tower from 2,000 to 3,000 cubic meters. Given the roof was already destroyed during the war, no further destruction of the already-existing structure was necessary to increase the volume. In 1955, the city announced an idea competition to expand the tower, which was won by the architect Rolf Vollhard. His design envisaged a modern extension of the tower, with an encompassing glass balcony serving as a separation between the old base and new extension.

The winning design sparked outrage among the population, forcing the plans to be discarded. In 1962, the Mannheim council decided to reconstruct the tower true to its original form, which was carried out in 1963. The reconstruction took place under the leadership of Ferdinand Mündel. The statue of Amphitrite on top of the tower, which was originally designed by Johannes Hoffart, was recreated by Hayno Focken.

The tower was restored in 1986/1987 and has been under monumental protection since 1987. Several minor renovations have taken place since then.

== Location ==
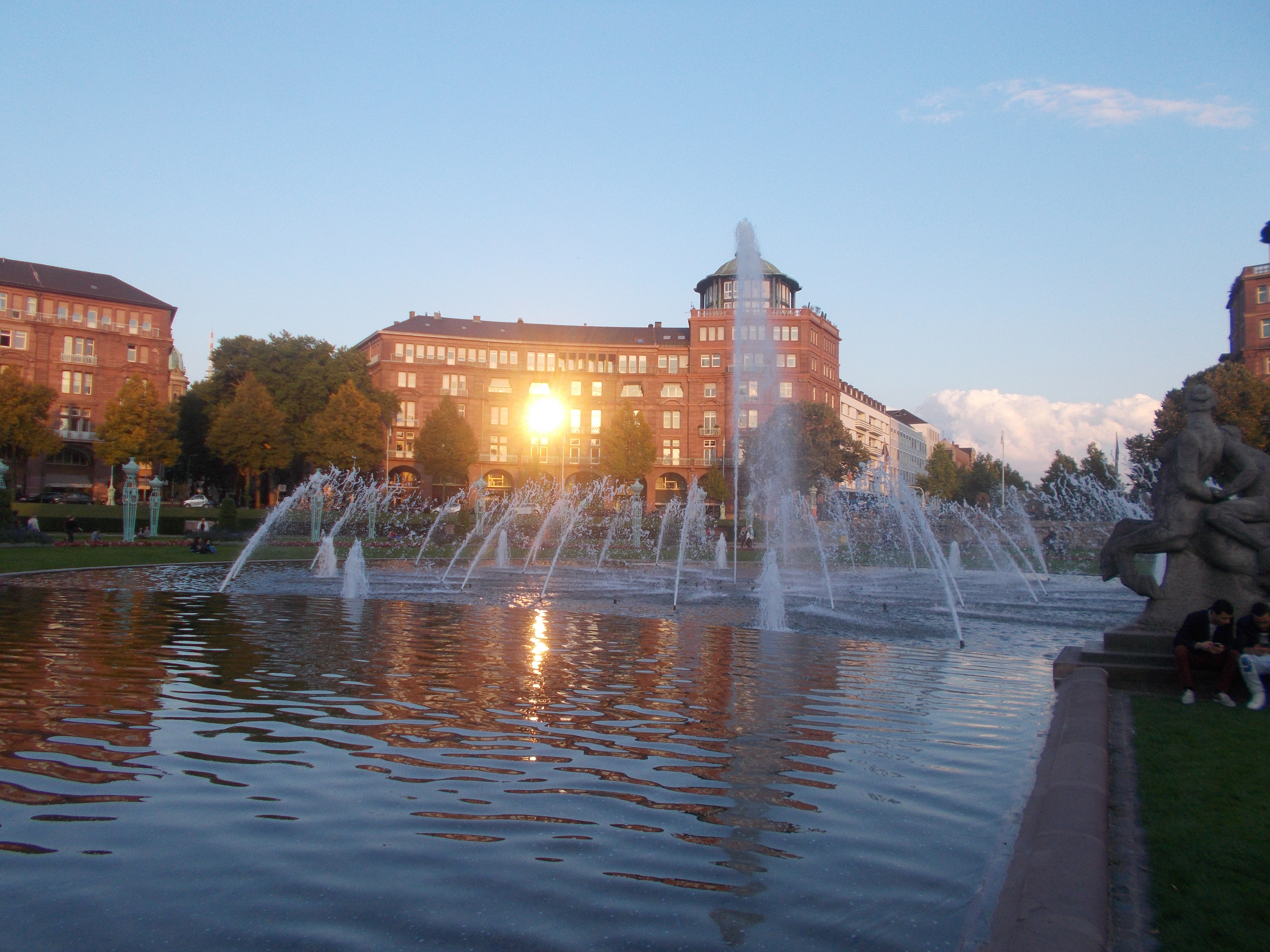
Fountain at the Mannheim water tower with a view towards Augusta street

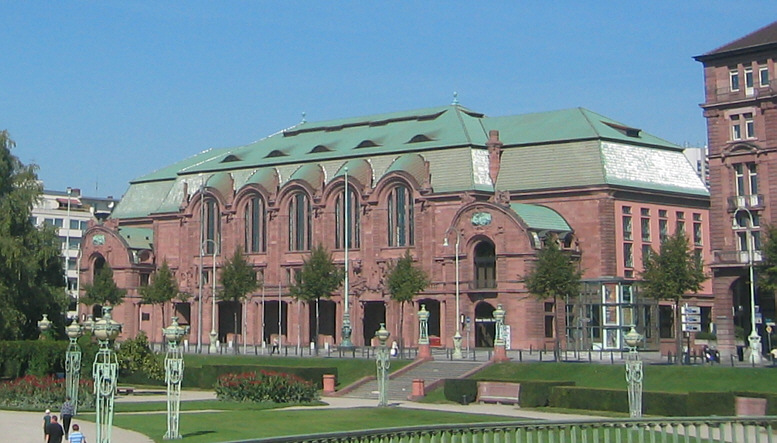
Mannheim rose garden

The tower stands in Frederick Square, which is surrounded by the Mannheim rose garden, the Mannheim art gallery, and a few semicircular arcade buildings. The park is a popular meeting area in the summer. A Christmas market is opened every winter.

The park around the water tower was designed as a semicircular park from 1899 to 1903 by the Berlin architect, Bruno Schmitz. The park is surrounded by a roundabout which leads to four arcade houses. The park itself is around 2.5 meters lower than the street and has four entrances via perrons: at the water tower, at the exit to the Augustaanlage, towards the rose garden, and towards the art gallery. There is a cascade water fountain between the outside stairs and the water tower; the water runs into a large water basin. A pergola runs in a semicircle from the water into the park.

== See also ==
- Category: Water Towers in Germany

== Literature ==
- "History of the Water Line in the Mountains of Rohrbach to Mannheim" (GoogleBooks)
- Johann Andreas von Traitter: The Water Line of Mannheim - Mannheim, 1798, historical Heidelberg holdings - digital, Heidelberg University Library.
- Gieseler/Ryll: Water Towers in Mannheim, a small series of publications of the Mannheim City Archives No. 9, Mannheim 1997
- Theodor Alt: The Mannheim Water Tower. An Aesthetic-Economic Study. Mannheim 1892
- Hans Weckesser: Beloved Water Tower. Mannheim 1991, ISBN 3-87804-206-X.
- Jens U. Schmidt, Günther Bosch, Albert Baur: Water Towers in Baden-Württemberg. 1st edition, 2009, ISBN 978-3-86929-002-7.
