= Monument to Freedom and Unity =

Planned monument in Berlin, Germany

Coordinates: 52°30′59.0″N 13°24′00.0″E

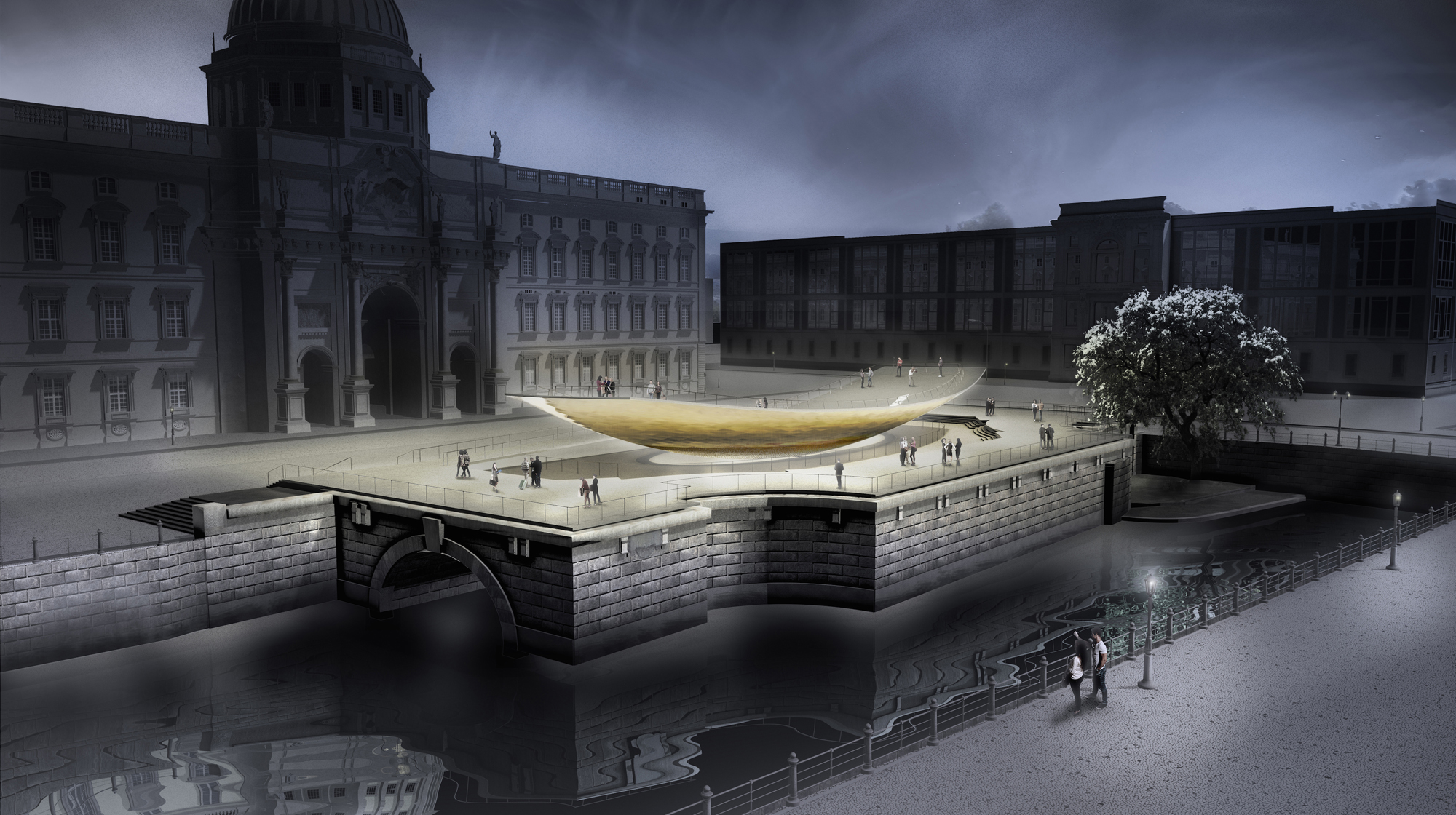
The monument viewed from the Schinkelplatz

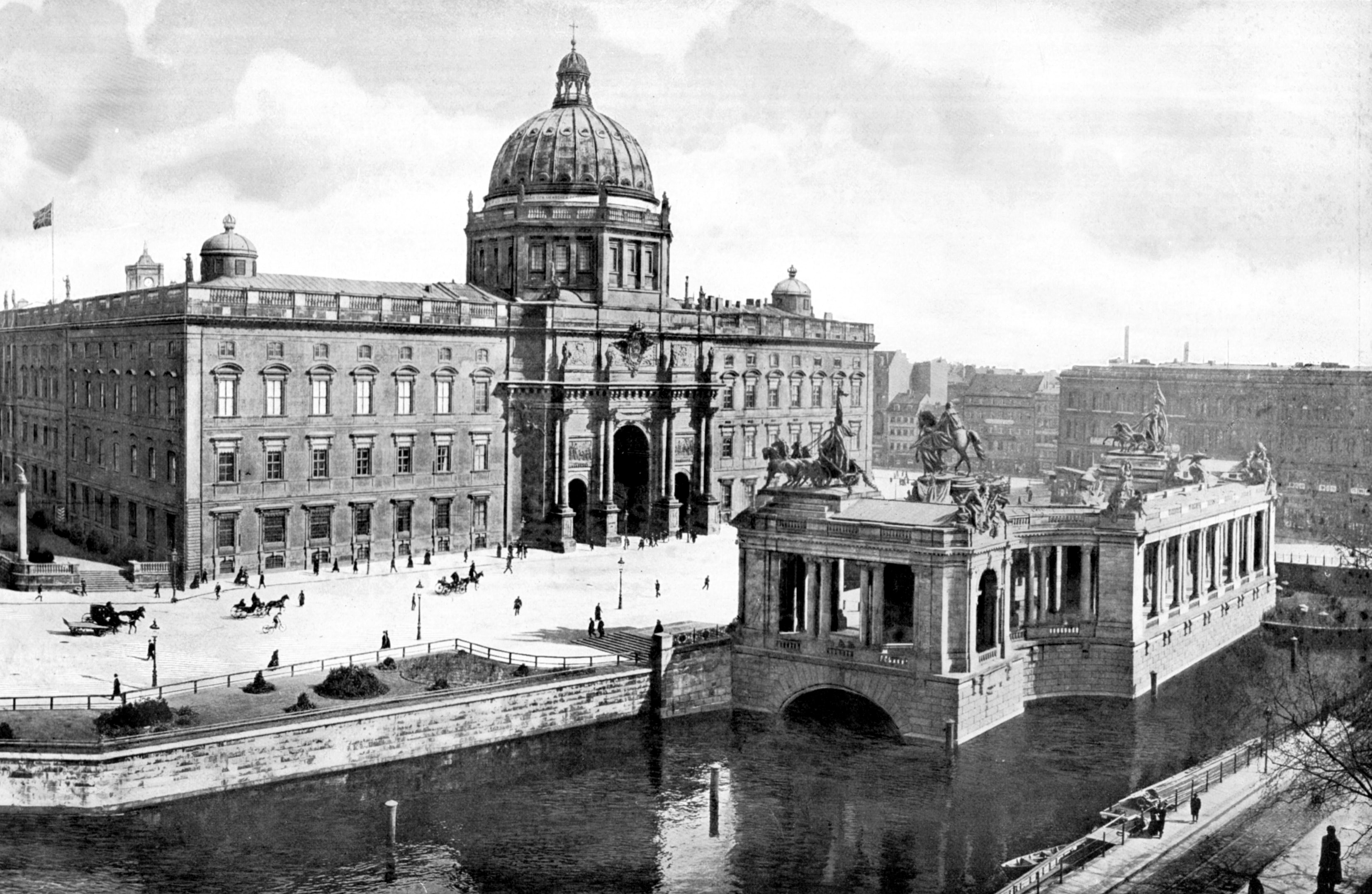
Berlin Palace and National Kaiser Wilhelm Monument, ca. 1900

The Monument to Freedom and Unity (German: Denkmal für Freiheit und Einheit) is a planned national German monument in Berlin commemorating the country's peaceful reunification in 1990 and earlier 18th, 19th and 20th century unification movements.

It was agreed on 9 November 2007 by a decree of the Bundestag. The decree proposed the site of the former National Kaiser Wilhelm Monument on the Schlossfreiheit for the new structure, next to the Berlin Palace containing the Humboldt Forum which was rebuilt between 2013 and 2020. The monument will feature the slogans "Wir sind das Volk, Wir sind ein Volk" (in English: ‘We are the people, We are one people’). This is a reference to the chants “Wir sind das Volk” adopted during the Monday demonstrations in 1989 and “Wir sind ein Volk” adopted by advocates of German reunification in 1990.

In early June 2017, the Bundestag decided to start construction of the memorial in front of the City Palace according to the design of Milla & Partner. It was to be inaugurated on the 30th anniversary of the fall of the Berlin Wall on 9 November 2019. However, construction began on 19 May 2020. The Federal Office for Building and Regional Planning expected completion of construction in 2023.

In March 2024, it was announced that the monument could no longer be completed that year due to the insolvency of the steel construction company and the general contractor. An audit was also initiated, as by the end of 2024 a total of €17 million had already been spent on the project.

== Beginnings and Bundestag Resolution ==
A small group of politicians, city planners, and journalists first proposed the idea for the future monument. On the 13 May 1998, after the conclusion of the competition for the Memorial to the Murdered Jews of Europe in Berlin, Florian Mausbach, Günter Nooke, Jürgern Engert and Lothar de Maizière began the "German Unity Memorial" (Denkmal Deutsche Einheit) initiative by writing a letter to the President of the Bundestag Rita Süssmuth, the Chancellor Helmut Kohl, the President of the German Bundesrat Gerhard Schröder and the Mayor of Berlin Eberhard Diepgen. A citizens' memorial, located in the centre of Berlin, would recognise the courage of individuals in opposing the state machinery by "expressing the liberating joy caused by the fall of the Berlin Wall - a memorial to historical happiness and tears of joy." At the same time, they began a signature campaign, which was able to secure the signatures of prominent figures and industry association representatives. They suggested the base of the National Kaiser Wilhelm Monument as an appropriate site, since it is between the Kronprinzenpalais - where the German reunification treaty was signed - and the seat of the Volkskammer in the Palace of the Republic, Berlin - where East Germany's accession to the Federal Republic was declared - and was additionally the location of the Alexanderplatz demonstration on the 4 November 1989, the largest demonstration of the Peaceful Revolution.

In April 2000, a cross-party group of East German parliamentarians made an application to the Bundestag, which was rejected by the Committee on Cultural and Media Affairs. In 2005, the Deutsche Gesellschaft took up the project, and, on the 9 November 2006, began to generate publicity for the project, by, amongst other things, holding hearings and contacting decision makers. In 2007, the Federal Foundation for the Reappraisal of the SED Dictatorship held an initial student competition to design the memorial. On the 9 November 2007, the Bundestag resolved to allow construction of the memorial. The federal government was called upon to collaborate with the Deutsche Gesellschaft on the design of the memorial. On the 18 March 2008, the initial proposers of the project and the Deutsche Gesellschaft were awarded the Deutscher Nationalpreis (German National Prize) for their work. After months of deliberations about the site of the monument (Pariser Platz, Leipziger Platz, Platz der Republik (Berlin), Platz des 18. März, Lustgarten, Berlin Palace), the original suggestion (the pedestal of the former National Kaiser Wilhelm Monument) was chosen, precisely because of its historical character as an authoritarian symbol; in June 2008, the project became part of the federal Gedenkstättenkonzeption (National Memorial Design).

== Competition and Planning ==
=== First Competition ===
At the beginning of 2009, the federal government announced a public, two-stage competition for the design of the monument. Submissions were anonymous, and a jury was tasked with selecting 20 participants to advance to the next stage of the process. The competition attracted 532 submissions from Germany and the rest of the world, including Jonathan Borofsky, Gottfried Böhm, Axel Schultes, Rob Krier, Waldemar Otto, and GRAFT. However, when the 19-person jury met on the 27 April 2009 to decide which submissions would advance, they were unable to form an absolute majority in support of any of the proposals, and the competition was cancelled.

Press coverage following this decision included juror comments that "a quarter of the proposals" were "complete rubbish"; the "naivety of many proposals" was said to be "devastating" and "shameful". However, members of the media, public and industry organisations, as well as individual jurors identified excellent proposals among the submissions, which effectively engaged with the historical issues. Thomas Brussig, a juror, blamed the jury for its own failure. He claimed that it had not spent sufficient time considering each work (approximately 30 seconds per submission). Other critics blamed the high-bar of only advancing proposals to the second round if they achieved an absolute majority, which was not a legal requirement, as well as the size of the jury for its failure. The participants were disappointed by the cancellation of the competition, and by the outburst of malice against them, and called for a renewed evaluation of the quality of their work.

=== Second Competition ===
On 1 July 2009, the Bundestag Committee on Cultural and Media Affairs voted to run a second competition. In addition to selecting proposals from the first competition, a committee would select approximately ten architects and artists for the second phase. The originally planned information centre was removed from the competition, and information about the events of the Peaceful Revolution was to be reduced.

The new process involved an initial, internationally open round of submissions, followed by a limited contest. A total of 386 proposals were submitted to the open round. An independent committee of experts, including 28 artists, selected participants for the subsequent limited competition. On 3 October 2010 in Berlin, the Federal Government Commissioner for Culture Bernd Neumann announced the results of the competition: three equally ranked prizes, and two marks of recognition were awarded. The three equally ranked prizes were awarded to Stephan Balkenhol, Andreas Meck, and Milla and Partner in collaboration with Sasha Waltz. The two marks of recognition were given to Xavier Veilhan, in collaboration with BP architectures, Paris, and realities:united (Jan and Tim Edler, working with Bjarke Ingels Group, Copenhagen). From 4 to 31 October 2010, all 28 proposals were exhibited in the Martin-Gropius-Bau in a free exhibition.

The committee recommended that all three winning submissions be revised. On 13 April 2011, the jury announced that it had settled on the revised proposal of Milla and Partner and the choreographer Sasha Waltz.

=== Winning Proposal ===
Sebastian Letz (of Milla and Partner)'s proposal Bürger in Bewegung (Citizens in Motion) is a basin which can be walked into, 50 m long, with 700 sq m of accessible surface area and a total weight of 150 tonnes. At its widest point, the basin is 2.5 m deep; it narrows at its edges, which gently lean upwards. The basin will be positioned on the pedestal of the former National monument, which will be retained. At the core of the construction is a steel support structure. The protest slogans from the Monday demonstrations are written on the upper side of the basin, which is made of bound gravel to reduce the risk of slipping: "Wir sind das Volk. Wir sind ein Volk." (We are the people. We are one people).
