= Friedrichsplatz =

Structure in Mannheim, Germany

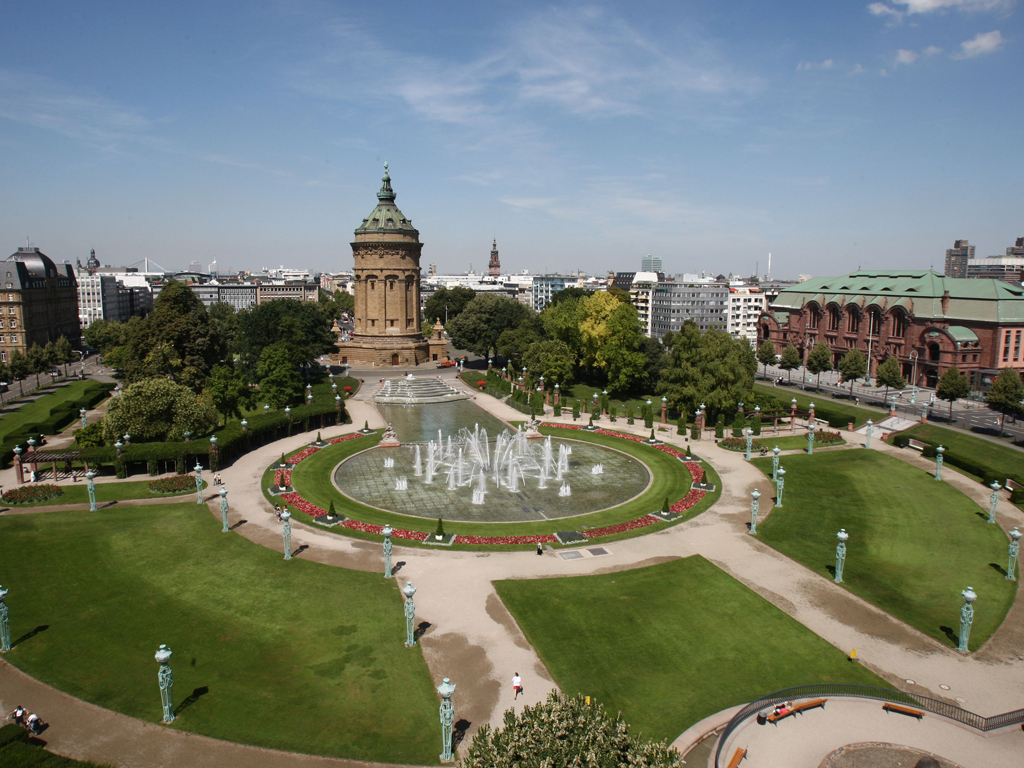
Friedrichsplatz with the Mannheim Water Tower, water features, and the Mannheimer Rosengarten (right)

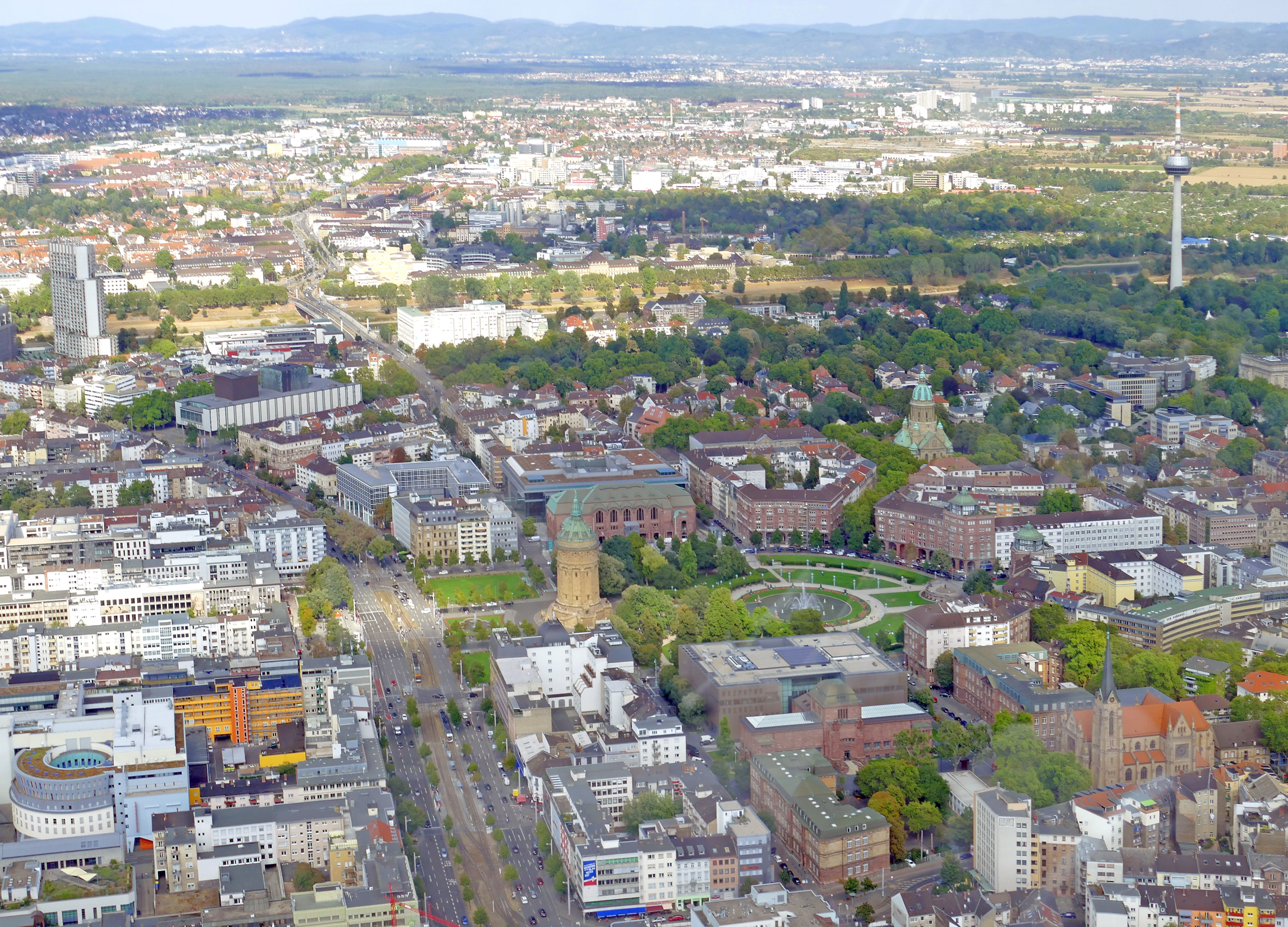
Aerial view of the Mannheim city center around Friedrichsplatz

The Friedrichsplatz in Mannheim is one of the most completely preserved neo-Baroque and Art Nouveau structures in Germany. It was laid out in the years following the completion of the Mannheim Water Tower in 1889.

== Water features ==
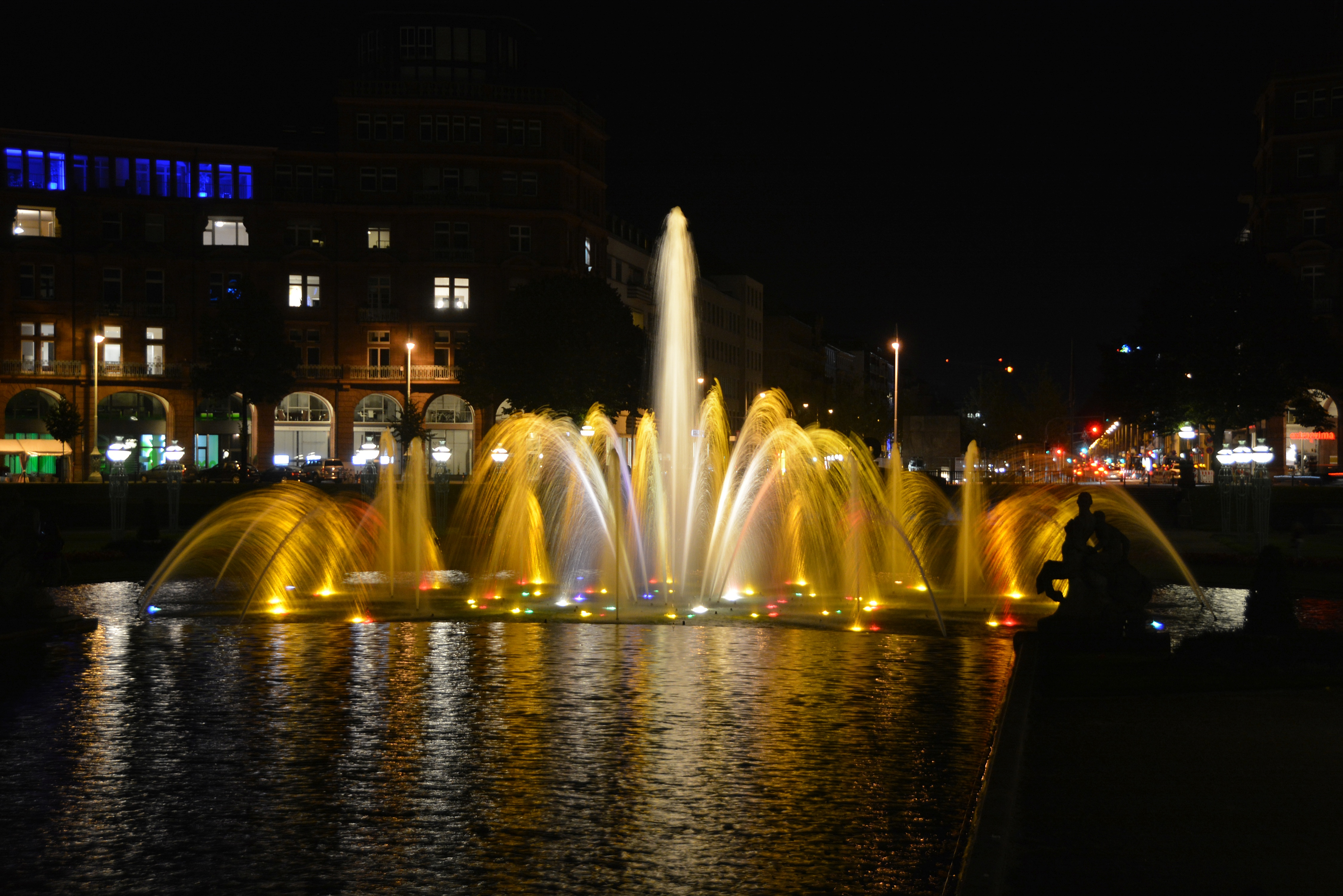
Water features on Friedrichsplatz at night

The garden behind the water tower contains a large water feature, first brought into operation on September 9, 1893. It consists of a water staircase leading to a large basin containing a fountain. The water feature, which operates from about the beginning of April to mid-October, is illuminated after dark on weekends and public holidays. In June 2020, a new LED-based lighting system with 84 spotlights was brought into operation, covering a wider color spectrum and saving roughly 90 percent of the previous power consumption. The fountain system was planned for complete renovation by 2023.
