= Gustav Halmhuber =

German architect (1862–1936)

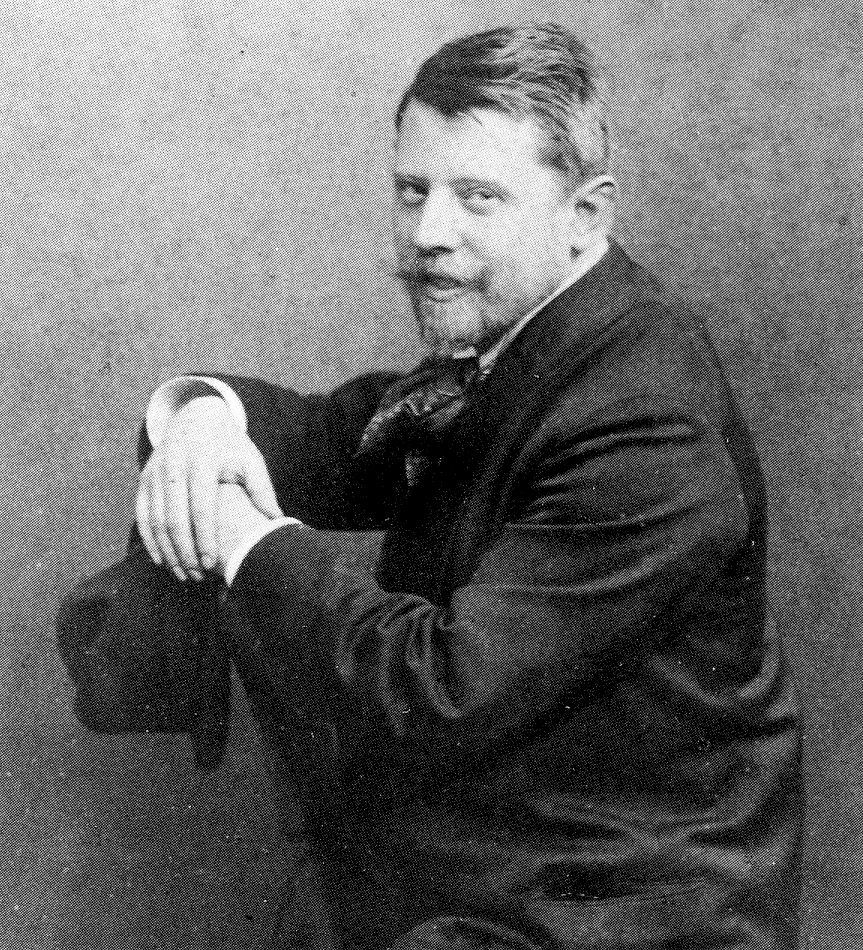
1902

Gustav Halmhuber (23 March 1862 – 25 August 1936) was a German architect and university teacher. His style reflected the flamboyance and brittle optimism of the early 20th century. Perhaps his best-known surviving work – also one of his earliest commissions – is the WaterTower (1886–1889) in Mannheim.

== Early life and education ==
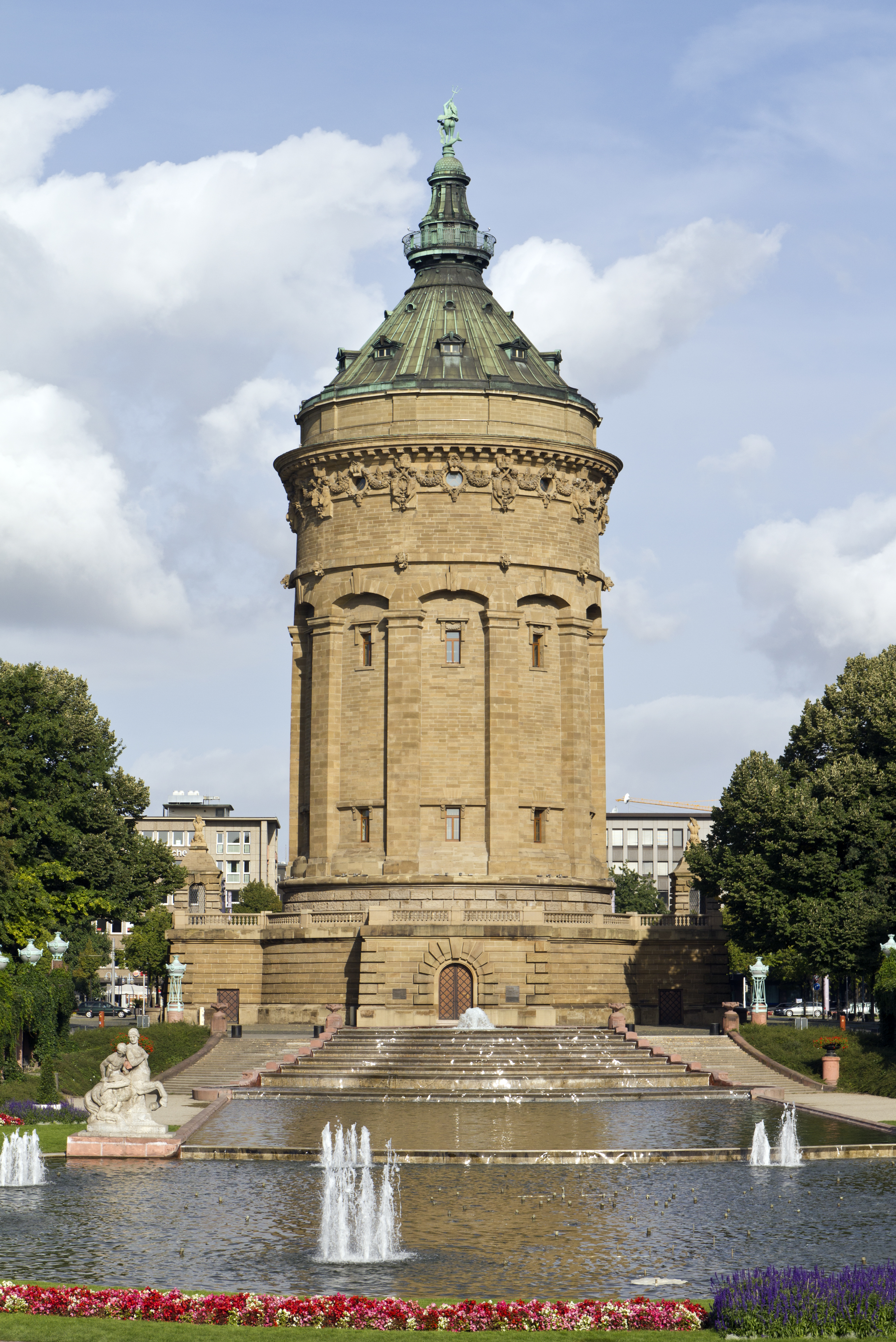
Water Tower, Mannheim

Gustav Friedrich Halmhuber was born and died in Stuttgart. He came from a long-established artisanal family of joiners and carpenters, with ancestral roots in West Prussia.

In 1880, Halmhuber enrolled at the Stuttgart Institute of Technology ("Technische Hochschule Stuttgart " as the university was known at that time) where he studied Architecture under the widely respected Christian Friedrich von Leins. At the same time, he was attending courses at the Stuttgart Fine Arts Academy ("Staatliche Akademie der Bildenden Künste Stuttgart"). Subsequently, he also studied at the Fine Arts Academies in Berlin and Karlsruhe. At Karlsruhe, he studied with the painter-professor Ferdinand Keller.

== Career ==
Following the conclusion of his formal training, Halmhuber worked briefly in Nuremberg with the architect Adolf Gnauth.

On 21 February 1893, Halmhuber was accepted as a freemason. Later, after moving to Hannover, in 1912 he joined the "Wilhelm zur deutschen Treue" lodge there.

In 1885, a nationwide competition was launched for the design of a large water tower for Mannheim. The organisers included the stipulation that the exterior of the tower should be both simple and worthy to fit in with the surrounding city architecture. This was in a quarter of Mannheim full of modern houses, many of them representative of the richly forthright Willhelmine style. Most of the 74 submissions considered by the jury were content to feature iron structures. Gustav Halmbuber was only 23, but his 60-meter-tall winning design, which earned him a 1,000 Mark prize, as well as considerable fame in the appropriate quarters, featured a yellow sandstone facing and drew unapologetically on models from Roman antiquity. The tower was constructed between 1886 and 1889, by which time Halmhuber had relocated to Berlin and, it would appear, lost interest in attempting to oversee the tower's construction. The city authorities sent him several requests, seeking his support over problems with the building contractors, but Halmhuber seems to have been unable to help: it is not known whether he responded to an invitation from the city fathers to visit Mannheim and see the tower after the scaffolding had been removed during or shortly after March 1889.

Halmhuber had moved on, and was one of several architects busy working under Paul Wallot on a new Reichstag building in Berlin. While he was engaged on the Reichstag project he was "spotted" by the sculptor Reinhold Begas, at whose instigation in 1894 he was offered, and accepted, a commission to draw up plans for the National Kaiser Wilhelm Monument in central Berlin. While Begas himself led up a small team creating the equestrian figure of the late emperor, Halmhuber dealt with the extensive architectural aspects of the structure. In 1895, in another collaboration with "the emperor's favourite sculptor", Reinhold Begas, Halmhuber completely reconfigured Berlin's (then) prestigious Siegesallee. The bombastic layout and overwhelmingly masculine selection of sculptures were revealing, possibly in ways that the designers did not intend. It was (and more than a century later remains) controversial.

During his later career, Halmhuber was increasingly, though never exclusively, focused on teaching. Between 1897 and 1906, he taught at the Stuttgart Institute of Technology ("Technische Hochschule Stuttgart"). Moving to Cologne, he found time to produce a design for an extensive redevelopment of the "Fine Arts Museum" ("Kunstgewerbemuseum") while serving, till 1909, as director at the institution then known as the "Kunstgewerbeschule" ("School of Arts and Crafts"). He also taught at Cologne's recently relaunched "Commercial Academy" ("Handelshochschule").

In 1909, Halmhuber relocated again, this time to the rapidly expanding city of Hannover, where he taught at what was then the Technical University of Hannover until his retirement in 1928. The reason for his move to Hannover appears to have been an invitation from the city authorities to take over from Hermann Eggert as architect for the prestigious new Hannover City Hall. Eggert's agreed departure appears to have resulted from a combination of personal and artistic-technical differences in respect of an unusually ambitious structure. The overall form of the extravagant shell of the building, which was sited on soft ground and mounted securely on 6,026 beech piles, was in most respects finalised by the time Halmhuber took over, but he was responsible for the widely admired interiors of the building. The less-than-harmonious combination of Eggert's choice of a version of neo-classicism for the exterior with Halmhuber's choice of "Jugendstil" interiors, though endorsed by the client – the Hannover city fathers – has nevertheless attracted comment from purists (and others) ever since. Eggert was conspicuously absent on 20 June 1913 when the emperor visited Hannover to attend the celebration for the inauguration of the new city hall.

== Recognition ==
During his time in Hannover, Halmhuber held the titles (municipal) Oberbaurat and Privy Counsellor ("Geheimrat") from the Berlin-based Prussian Ministry for Public Works.. He was a member of the Bund Deutscher Architekten (BDA / "Association of German Architects"). He also received, in 1921, an honorary doctorate (eine "Ehrendoktorwürde") from his alma mater and former employer, the Stuttgart Institute of Technology ("Technische Hochschule Stuttgart ").

== Principal commissions ==
- 1884–1894: Employed on the Reichstag building in Berlin under Paul Wallot
- 1886–1889: Water Tower Friedrichsplatz, Mannheim
- 1894–1897: National Kaiser Wilhelm Monument opposite the Berlin Palace
- 1895–1901: Architectural design for the Siegesallee (Tiergarten), Berlin
- 1906: Fine Arts Museum ("Kunstgewerbemuseum"), Cologne
- 1909–1913: Interiors for the Hannover City Hall
