= Karlheinz Oswald =

German sculptor (born 1958)

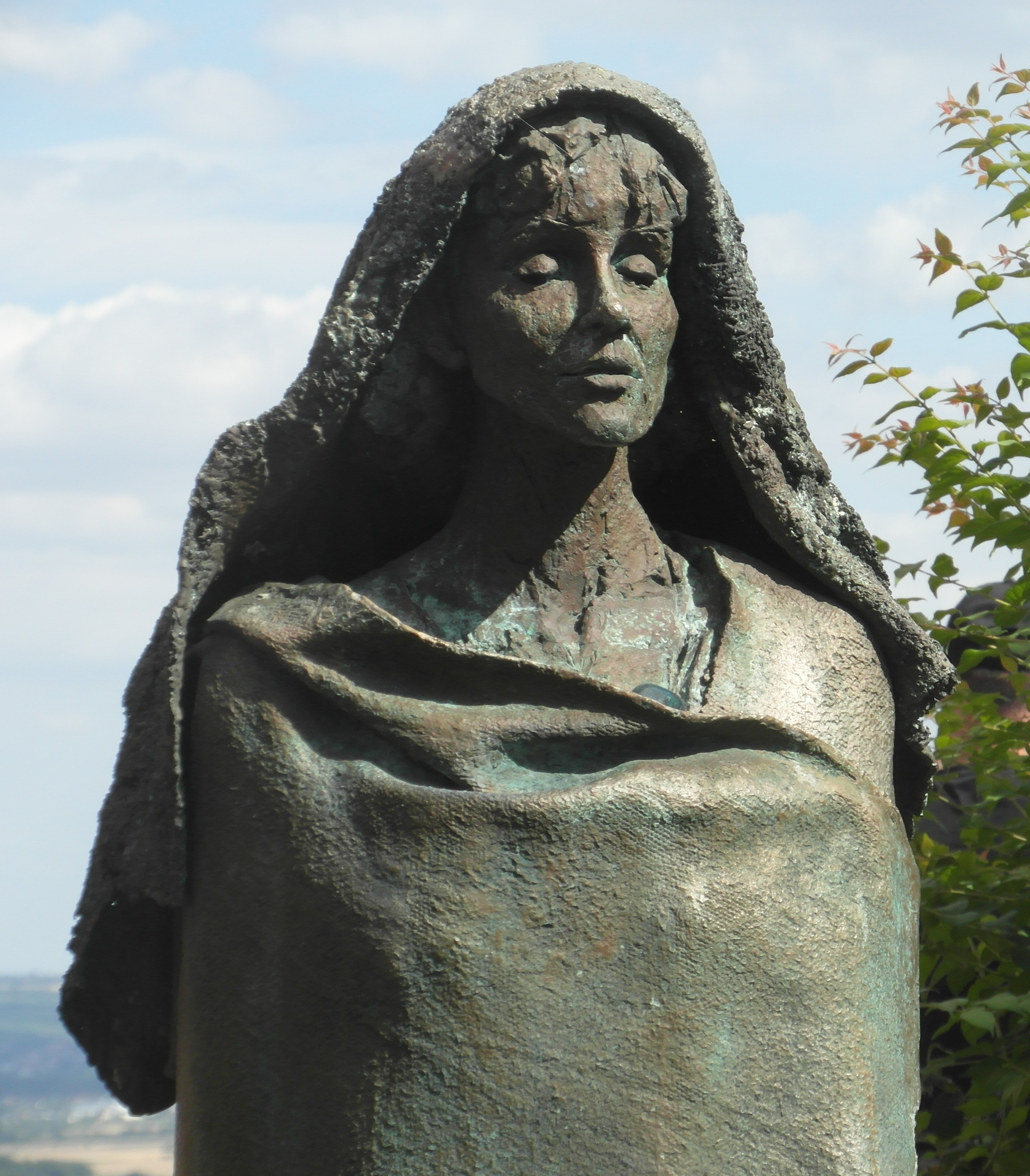
- Sculpture of Hildegard of Bingen, bronze, 1998, in front of Eibingen Abbey
- Born: 1958 (age 67–68); Worms, Germany
- Education: Johannes Gutenberg University
- Known for: sculpture
- Website: oswald-atelier.de

Karlheinz Oswald (born 1958) is a German sculptor known for his portraits and cast iron sculptures, many of dancers, often displayed in public places. He studied at the Johannes Gutenberg University in Mainz from 1981, and between 1983 and 1988 worked in Thomas Duttenhoefer's studio in Wiesbaden. Oswald began to produce his first sculptures of dancers in 1988, and the following year his first stained glass windows were displayed at the International Sculpture Symposium in Dreieich. He has operated his own workshop since 1989. In 1991 he won the Sports Toto prize including a trip to New York where he studied movements of dancers at the Alvin Ailey American Dance Theater. He collaborated from 1996 with dancers of the Deutsche Staatsoper Unter den Linden in Berlin, who inspired his sculptures.

Among Oswald's other work is a figure of Christ in the Mainz Cathedral and a life-sized steel sculpture of the martyr Georg Häfner in Würzburg.

== Education and work ==
Born in Worms, Oswald studied from 1981 at the Johannes Gutenberg University, Mainz, with Werner Durth, Heinz Hemrich and Peter Lörincz (born 1938), graduating in 1990. Between 1983 and 1988 he worked in Thomas Duttenhoefer's studio in Wiesbaden.

In 1984, he received the prize of the Southern Wine Route, Landau, for metal castings of figures, portraits and reliefs of his first works displayed in the public space. In 1985, he won the Daniel-Henry Kahnweiler Prize from the Kahnweiler Foundation Rockenhausen. The following year he was awarded a scholarship from Johannes Gutenberg University and the Gutenberg grant from the city of Mainz. In 1987, he was city printer for Mainz and made a study trip to Rome. In 1988, he embarked dancer studies, producing his first sculptures of dancers. His first stained glass windows were displayed at the 1989 International Sculpture Symposium in Dreieich. In 1990, he was awarded the Förderpreis Kulturfonds Mainzer Wirtschaft.

Since 1989 Oswald has operated his own workshop. In 1991 he received the prize of the Sports Toto GmbH Rhineland-Palatinate, coupled with a study trip to New York where he made studies of dancers at the Alvin Ailey American Dance Theater. In 1994 he made a study trip to Florence and Verona and in 1996 made studies of ballet dancers at the Deutsche Staatsoper Unter den Linden in Berlin. His ballerinas have been described as seeming to "elude gravity, they appear to hover as if they have lost all contact with the floor". His figure of Christ at Mainz Cathedral is modeled on a dancer with African roots and seems to fly rather than hang and suffer. In 2000 Oswald created a bust in iron of the entrepreneur and art collector Heinrich Vetter which can be seen in the Mannheim Luisenpark park on a trail named after Vetter, together with other works from Vetter's collection. In 2011 he created a life-sized steel sculpture of Georg Häfner, a martyr who was beatified on 15 May 2011.

== Selected works in public space ==
- 1986: Hermann Kardinal Volk, (Bishop Hermann Volk), bronze bust, Mainz and Alzey (1999)
- 1988: Sebastian Münster, 500 years anniversary of his birth, monument, in front of St. Remigius, Ingelheim
- 1991: Tanz (Dance), bronze, Limburg
- 1994: Blessed Maria Katharina Kasper, parish in Wirges, Westerwald
- 1995: Nike and Niobe, bronze and basalt, Landesbausparkasse Mainz
- 1995: Bust of Rupert Mayer, 50th anniversary of his death, Stuttgart Cathedral
- 1996: Undine, fountain, bronze, Alzey, in front of the old town hall
- 1998: Hildegard of Bingen, bronze, Museum on the River, Bingen, and Eibingen Abbey
- 1998: Christus commissioned in connection with the Katholikentag, Mainz Cathedral,
- 1999: Juigalpa, glass image for Nicaragua
- 1999: Coubertin, iron, International Olympic Committee, Lausanne
- 1999: Bonifatius, 1.90 cm high bronze statue of St. Boniface representing him as a Benedictine, at the entrance of the Gotthard Chapel of the Mainz Cathedral
- 2000: Primera, bronze, Luisenpark Mannheim
- 2000: St. Ansgar, in front of the new cathedral of Hamburg, Domkirche St. Marien
- 2000: Gutenberg an der Druckerpresse (Gutenberg at his Printing Press), for the Johannes Gutenberg anniversary, in front of the church St. Christoph, Mainz where he was baptised
- 2004: Rheintöchter (Rhinemaidens), Fort Malakoff Park, Mainz
- 2008: Quartett (Quartet), bronze, Peter Cornelius Conservatory, Mainz
- 2011 Georg Häfner, in the Neubaukirche Universitätskirche (new university church) Würzburg, where he is buried
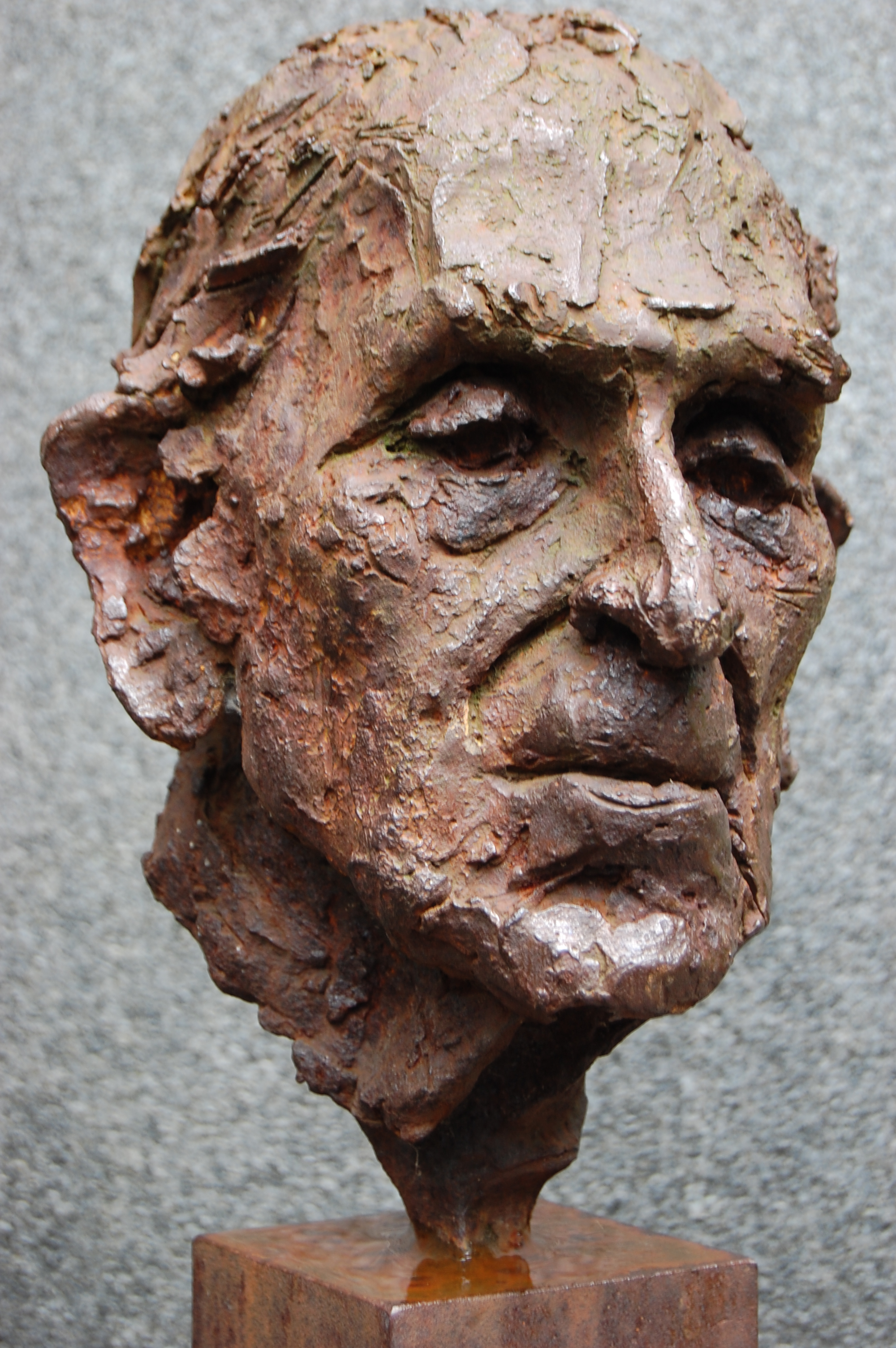
Heinrich Vetter, iron, 2000, Luisenpark, Mannheim, Luisenpark, Mannheim

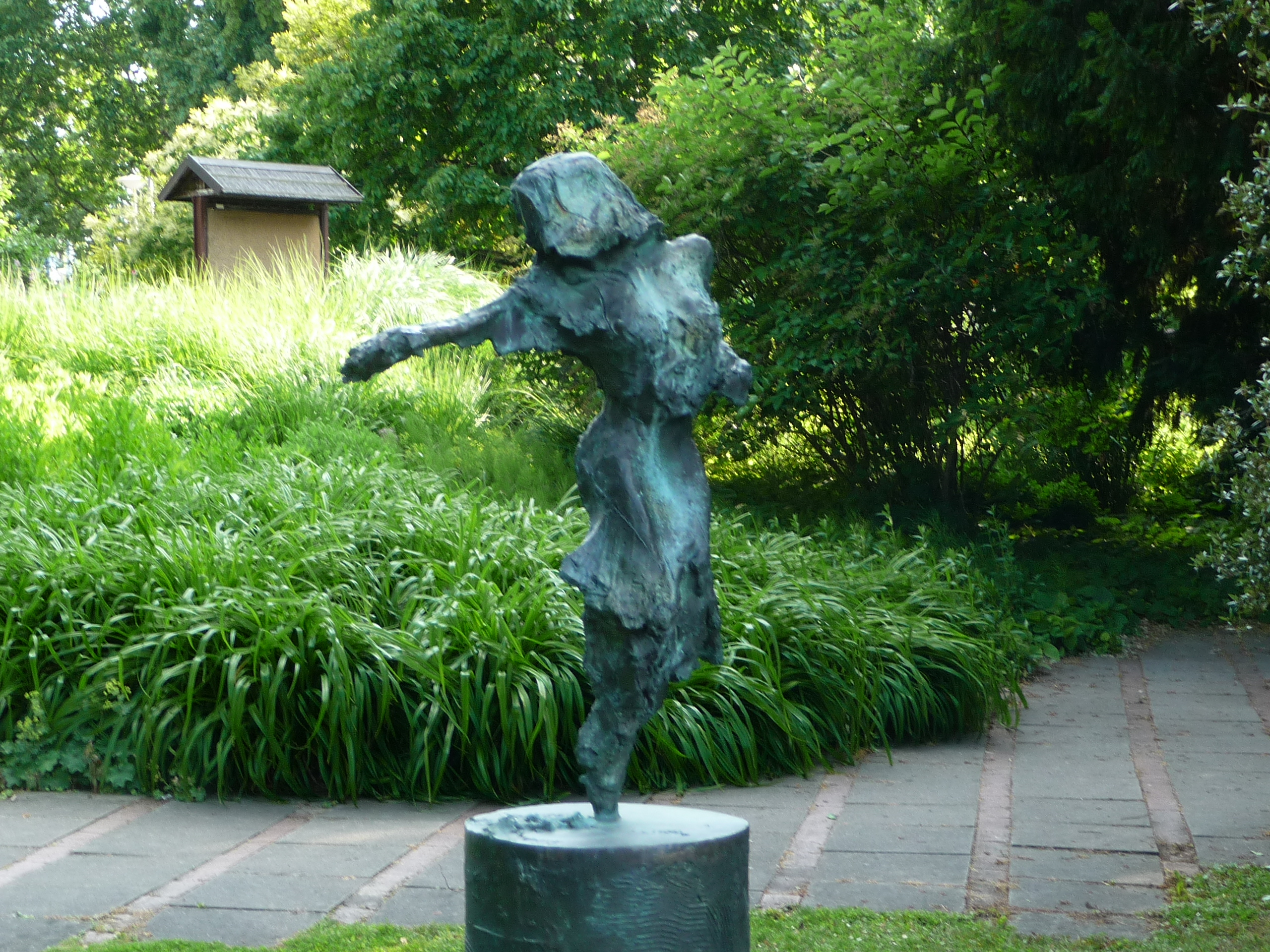
Primera, cast iron, 2000, Luisenpark

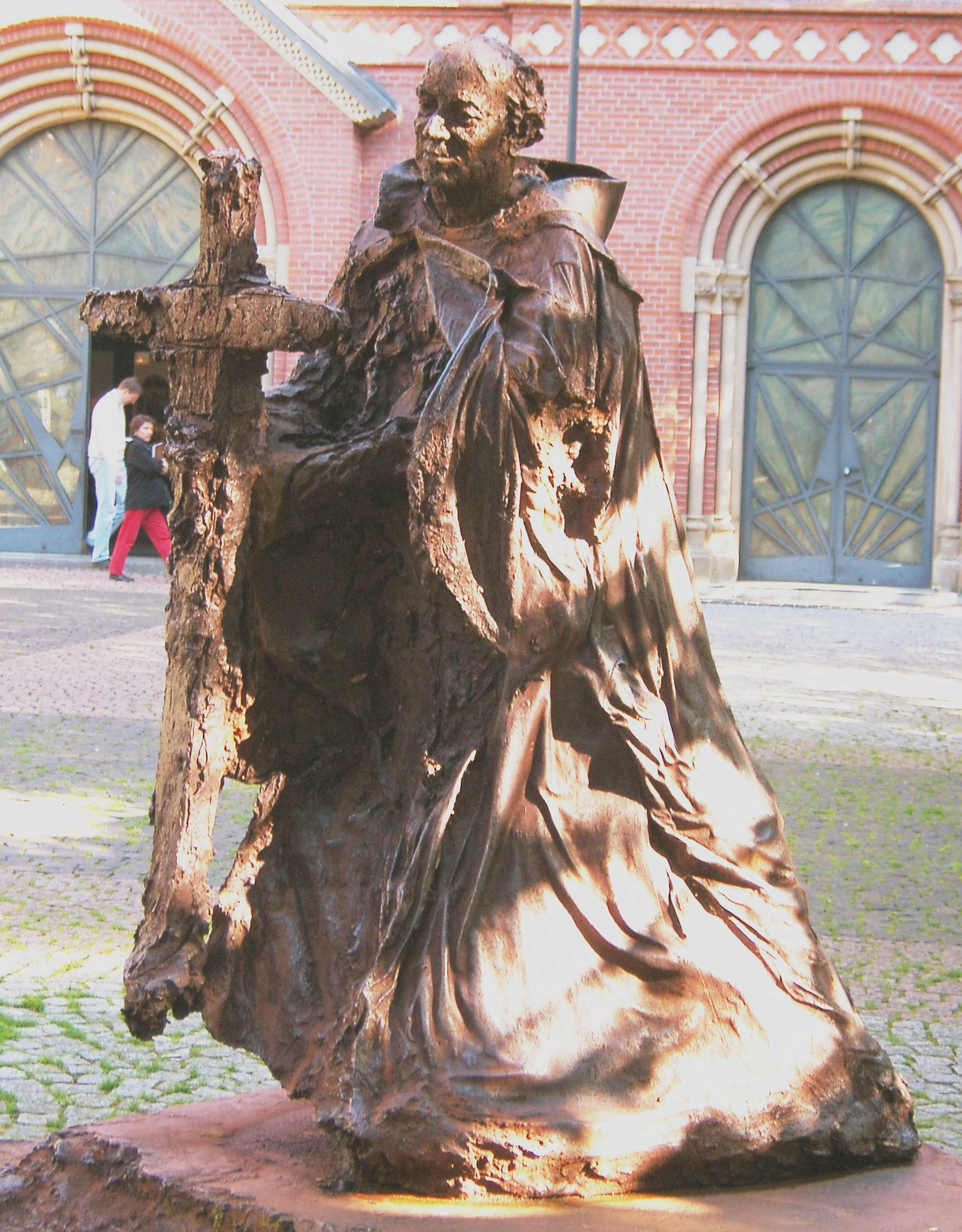
St. Ansgar (2000), in front of Domkirche St. Marien, Hamburg

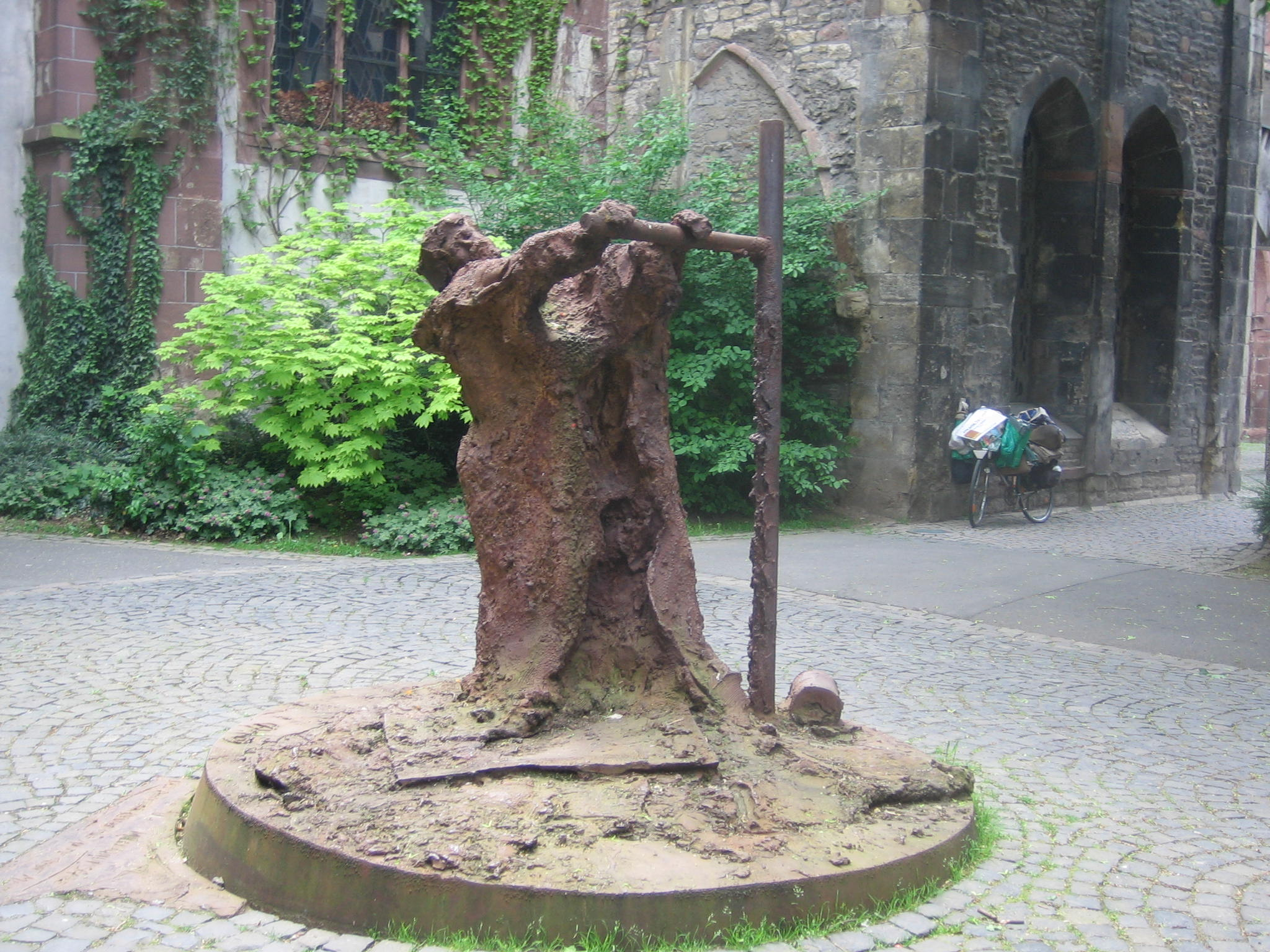
Gutenberg at his Printing Press (2000), in front of St. Christoph, Mainz

== Literature ==
- Ludwig Harig: Stadtschreiber Ludwig Harig – Stadtdrucker Karlheinz Oswald. in: Mainz, bewegte Stadt. Schmidt, Mainz 1989, ISBN 3-87439-184-1.
- Karl Heinz Oswald, Hans-Jürgen Imiela, Hargen Depelmann, Ina Celmer: Karlheinz Oswald. Plastisches Werk 1984–1995. Ed.-Verlag, Langenhagen 1996, ISBN 3-928330-15-2.
- Karl Heinz Oswald. Arbeiten für den Kirchenraum. Verlag Universitätsdruckerei H. Schmidt, Mainz, 2008.
