= Ludwigshafen University Library =

University library in Rhineland-Palatinate, Germany

Coordinates: 49°28′57″N 8°26′50″E

- Hochschulbibliothek Ludwigshafen
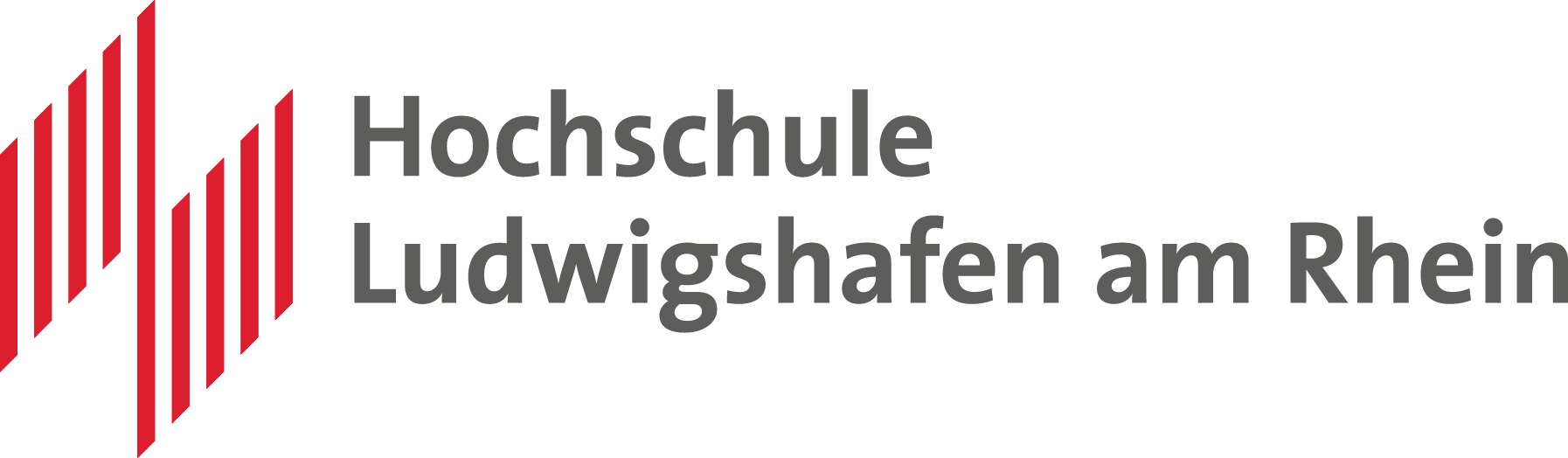

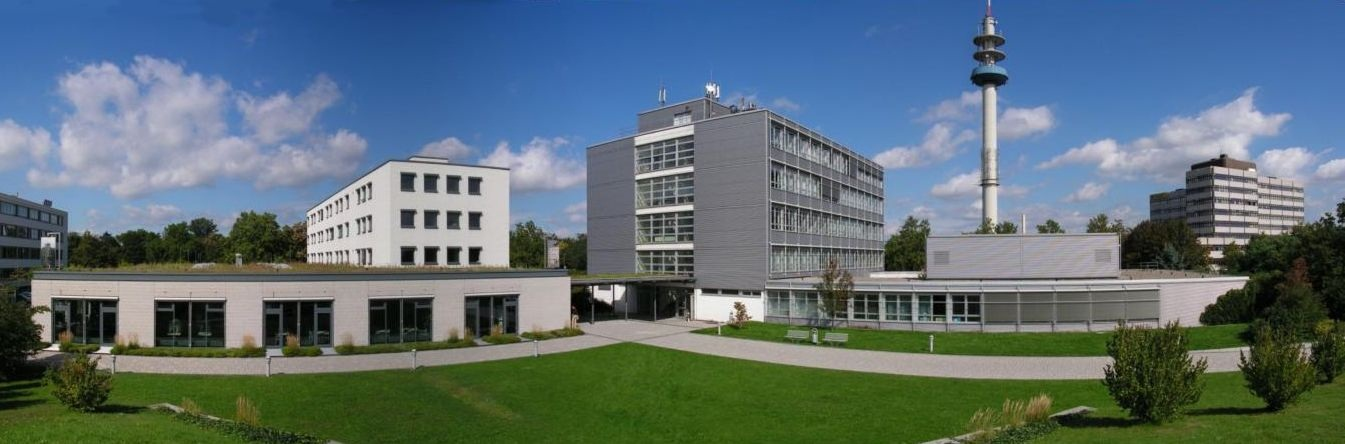
- Location: Ernst-Boehe-Str. 4, 67059 Ludwigshafen; Maxstraße 29, 67059 Ludwigshafen; Rheinpromenade 12, 67059 Ludwigshafen, Germany
- Type: University library, lending library
- Scope: Economics, finance, business, social work, nursing, East Asia
- Established: 1965
- Branches: 3

Collection
- Items collected: books, journals, electronic media
- Size: 122000 books 49700 e-books 270 subscribed journals 41250 e-journals

Access and use
- Circulation: 83,550
- Population served: Researchers, students, public

Other information
- Director: Torsten Haß
- Employees: 11
- Website: bib.hwg-lu.de

The Ludwigshafen University Library supplies the Ludwigshafen University of Business and Society with literature for research and higher education purposes. Users are primarily students and lecturers, although the library is open to the general public. In the CHE ranking the Ludwigshafen University Library holds a top position (in German: Spitzengruppe) in the rated courses of study.

== History ==
The Ludwigshafen University Library was founded in 1965. In 2008, it integrated the library of the Lutheran University for Applied Sciences Ludwigshafen. The nucleus of the collection of this Lutheran Library, which had been founded in 1971, may be traced back to a library of the Speyer Inner Mission. One branch of the Ludwigshafen University Library is the Library of the East Asia Institute Ludwigshafen.

== Collections ==
Access to full text journal articles is available through the Electronic Journals Library (EZB). Access to the databases is available through the Database Information System (DBIS)

== Networks and cooperations ==
The Ludwigshafen University Library relies on the Hochschulbibliothekszentrum (hbz), a union catalog that itemizes the collections of 63 university and state libraries in North Rhine-Westphalia and Rhineland-Palatinate.

The Ludwigshafen University Library is also actively engaged in the community of Rhineland-Palatinate libraries and collaborates with the Mannheim University Library.

== See also ==
- Ludwigshafen University of Applied Sciences
- East Asia Institute Ludwigshafen
- List of libraries
- List of libraries in Germany
