= East Asia Institute =

East Asia Institute may refer to:

- East Asia Institute (Korea), an independent think tank in Seoul, South Korea
- East Asia Institute (Ludwigshafen), an academic department at Ludwigshafen University of Applied Sciences, Germany

== See also ==
- East Asian Institute (Singapore), an autonomous research institute of the National University of Singapore
- The Institute of East Asian Studies at Leipzig University, Germany
- Weatherhead East Asian Institute, a community of scholars affiliated with the Columbia University in New York
