= Luisenpark =

Municipal park in Mannheim, Baden-Württemberg, Germany

Coordinates: 49°28′57.69″N 8°29′50.63″E

- Interactive map of Luisenpark
- Type: Municipal park
- Location: Mannheim, Baden-Württemberg, Germany
- Area: 42 hectares (100 acres)
- Established: 1892–1903
- Founder: Carl William Casimir Fox (bequest)
- Designer: Siesmayer brothers (Frankfurt)
- Operator: Stadtpark Mannheim GmbH (upper park; non-profit)
- Open: Daily (entrance fee)

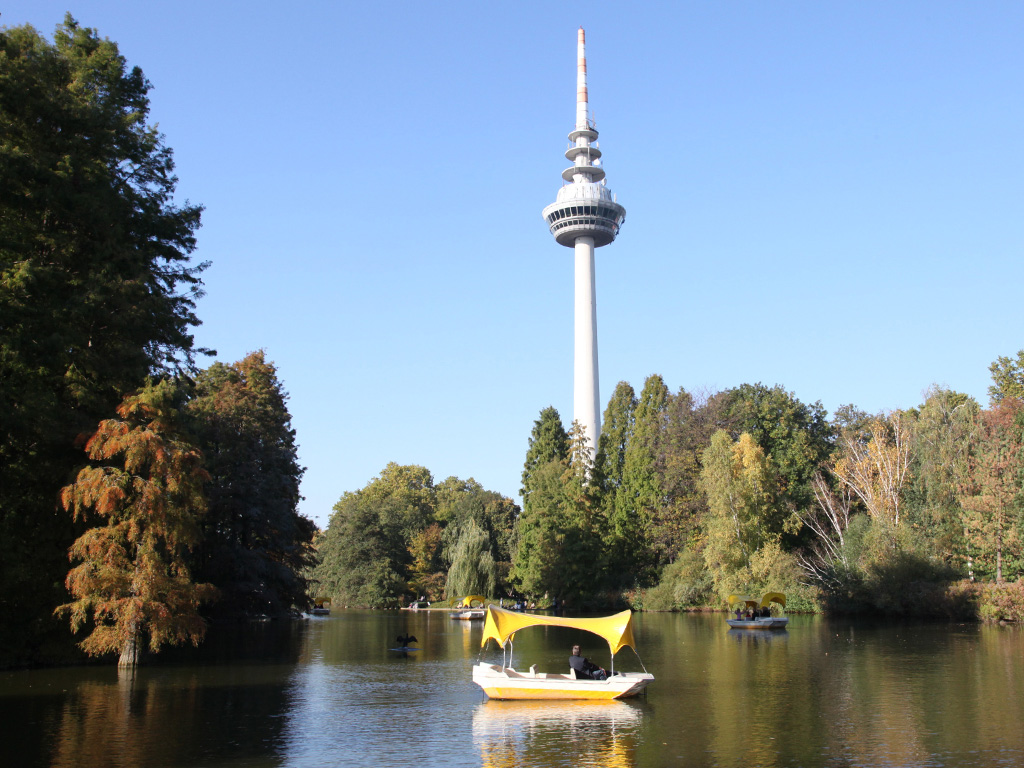
Fernmeldeturm Mannheim and Kutzerweiher

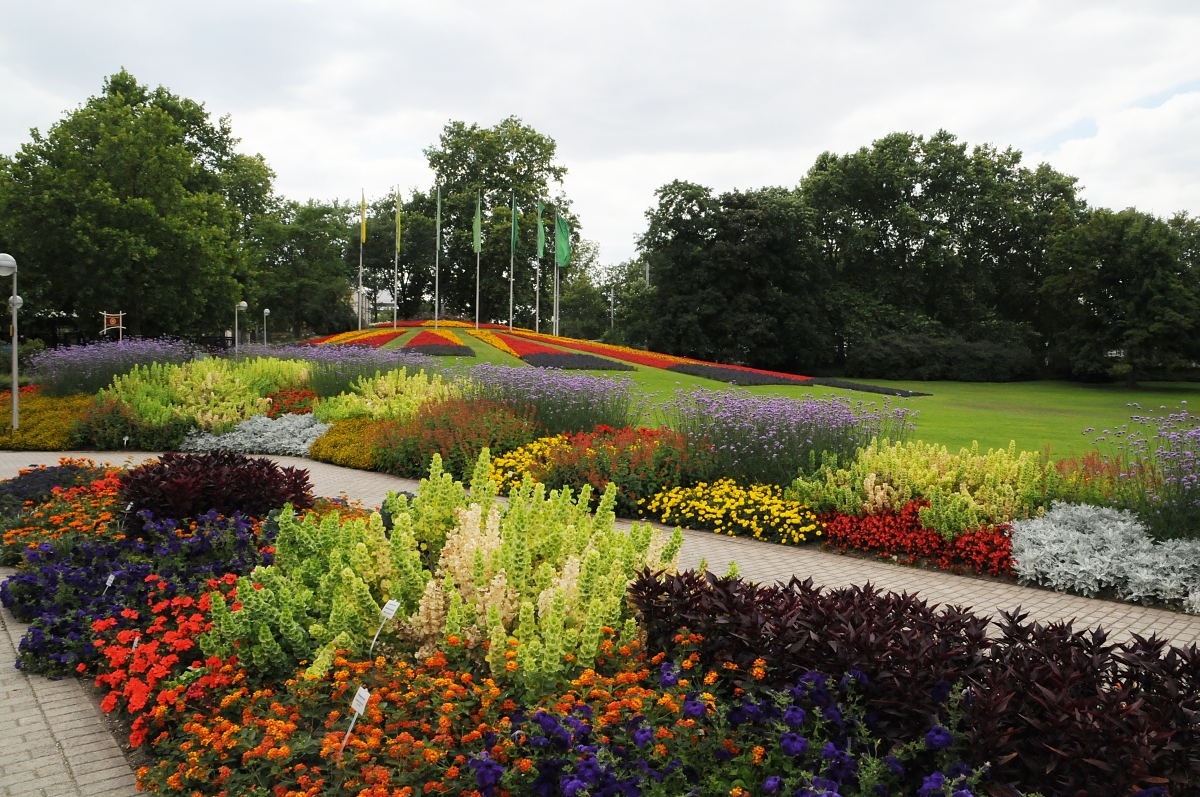
Near the main entrance

The Luisenpark is a municipal park in Mannheim, Baden-Württemberg, Germany. It is located on the left bank of the Neckar river and has an area of 42 hectares. The lower Luisenpark (Unterer Luisenpark) is the oldest part which is conserved as a historic garden. The upper Luisenpark (Oberer Luisenpark) includes various attractions, such as a greenhouse, an arboretum, a Chinese garden, gondoletta boats, and a variety of facilities for children. Along with the Herzogenriedpark (33 hectares; located on the other side of the Neckar) the upper Luisenpark is operated by the non-profit Stadtpark Mannheim GmbH.

== History ==
The Luisenpark was built between 1892 and 1903, formed upon the legacy of scientist Carl William Casimir Fox, who bequeathed 20,000 Deutsche Marks in his will to the city of Mannheim for the making of a new park. This amount was not sufficient for total financing, but formed a foundational start. Construction work began at the end of 1892. The design of the park was done by the Siesmayer brothers, Frankfurt landscape gardeners.

Conditions for the ascent of the Luisenparks for supraregional meaning was the resolution of the Mannheimer local council on November 18, 1969, to develop the Luisenpark as well as the Herzogenriedpark (to accomplish the Bundesgartenschau 1975). At that time the park was extended to a size of 42 hectares by the inclusion of a former racecourse.

The sales of 186,000 season tickets, which was not even reached by all federal horticultural shows, the number of 8.1 million visitors, and the removal of the Luisenpark fence, convinced the city council to operate the Luisenpark as city park with entrance fee. On October 21, 1975, the decision was made for a closed Luisenpark with an entrance fee. At first they agreed on two trial years, but over 38,000 annual tickets sold were a convincing argument to keep the park in this form.

== Name ==
The Luisenpark is named after princess Luise Marie Elizabeth of Prussia, a close relative of three German emperors: William I was her father, Frederick III was her brother and William II was her nephew.

On September 26, 1856, when she was eighteen-years old, she married the Prince Regent, later Grand Duke of Baden, Frederick I. She carried out crucial pioneering work for the Wohlfahrtspflege in Baden. As an eighty-year-old, she, along with her daughter, Queen Victoria of Sweden, had to flee through a window from marauding soldiers attempting to take the castle in Karlsruhe.

== Attractions ==
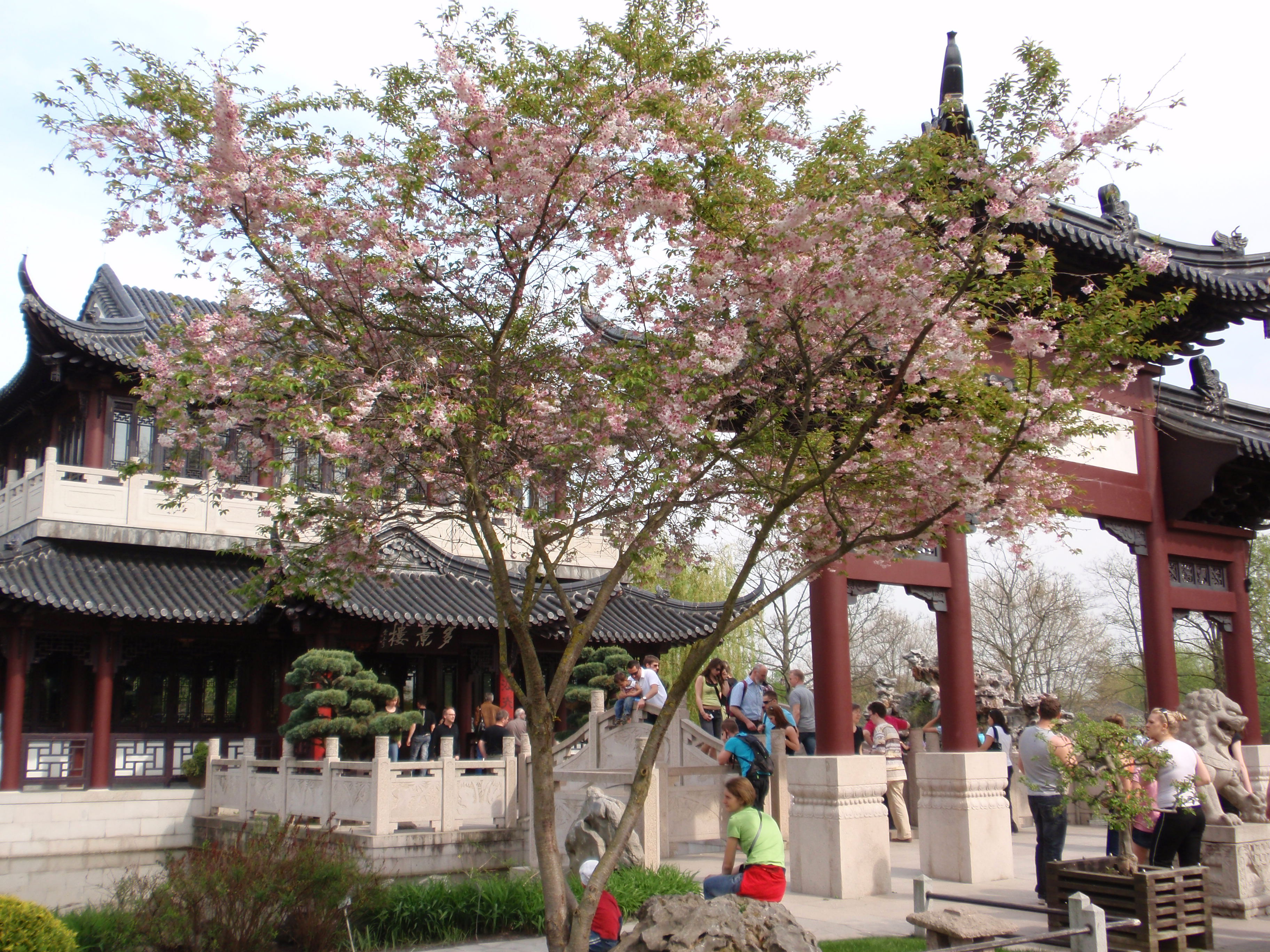
Chinese tea house

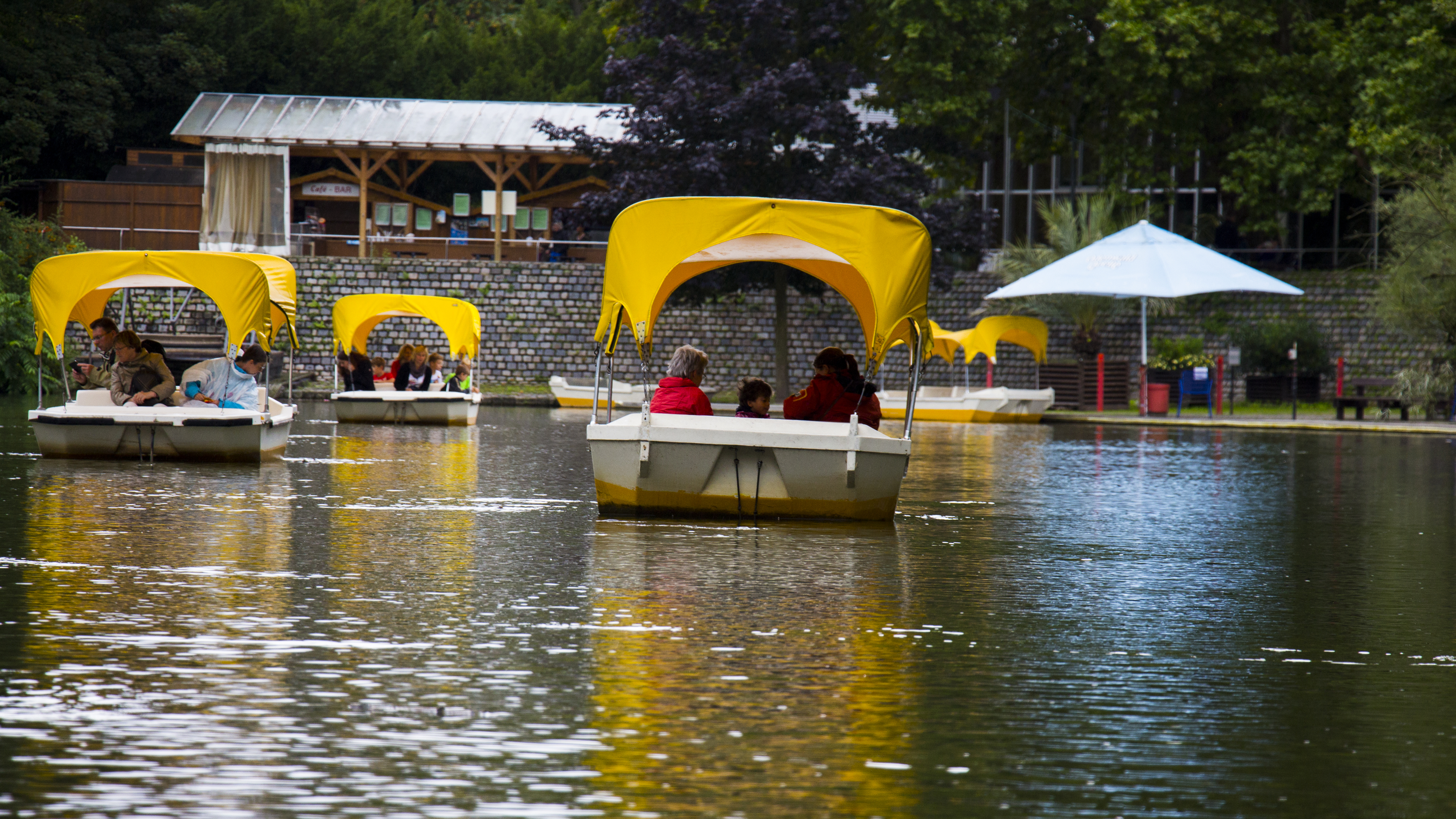
Gondolettas

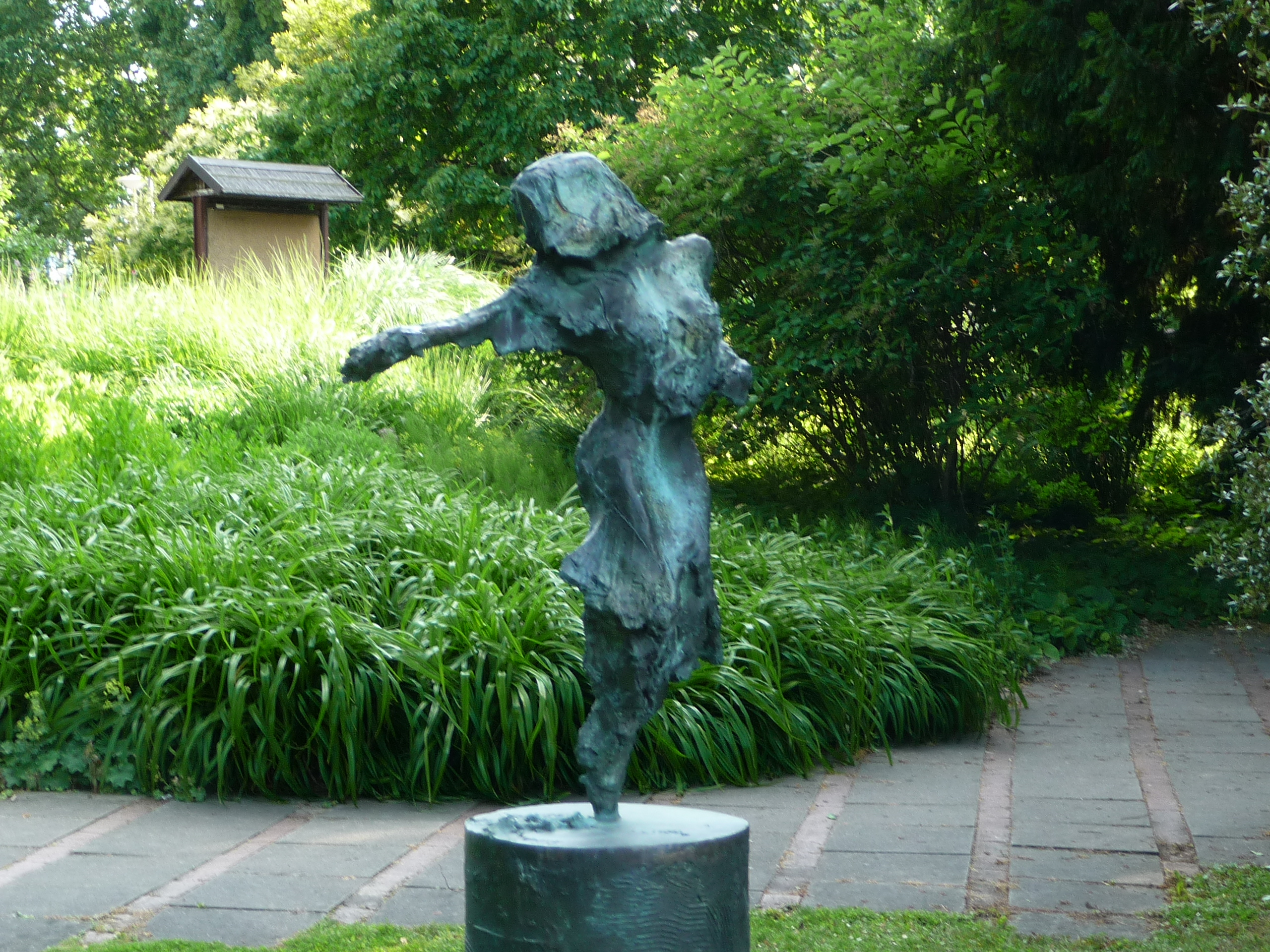
Primera by Karlheinz Oswald

The park contains a number of amusements and gardens, including a Chinese garden, rose garden, arboretum, and greenhouses for display and for tree ferns.

- The Kutzerweiher (40,000 m^{2}), a lake forming a side-channel (slough) of the (old) Neckar river. Gondolettas, tow boat ride: boats pulled by an underwater rope, follow a 1,840 meter long looped course around the lake.
- An open-air stage with approximately 1,000 seats has offered since 2006 a place for concerts, operas, musical shows and plays.
- The Chinese garden (5,000 m^{2}), named "garden of the many views" (Chinese: 多景园 Duojingyuan, German: Garten der vielen Ansichten), and its tea house were built in co-operation with Mannheim's Chinese twin city Zhenjiang (province Jiangsu), the Klaus Tschira charitable trust in Heidelberg, and the East Asia Institute (Ostasieninstitut) Ludwigshafen. The donation of 1,77 million Deutsche Mark (DM) from the estate of Diplom-Kaufmann Georg Schmuck, provided the financial foundation for the garden and tea house.
- The Pflanzenschauhaus (2,700 m^{2}), a greenhouse and exhibition garden, is located at the site of the Palmenhaus (palm house) which was destroyed in the Second World War. It contains a butterfly house, bird exhibits, as well as salt and fresh water aquariums.
- Towering over the Luisenpark is a 205 meter high telecommunication tower (Fernmeldeturm) with its rotating restaurant at 125 meters above the ground.
- The Spielwiese (2,700 m^{2}), a large playground and leisure meadow, located on the grounds of the original race track, borders on a model farm with domestic animals enclosures, and a Chinese tea house.
- The Heinrich-Vetter-Weg is a trail lined by more than 20 sculptures from the collection of Heinrich Vetter, by artists such as Amadeo Gabino, Kubach-Wilmsen, Ben Muthofer and Karlheinz Oswald

== See also ==
- List of botanical gardens in Germany
