= Heinz Hemrich =

German sculptor

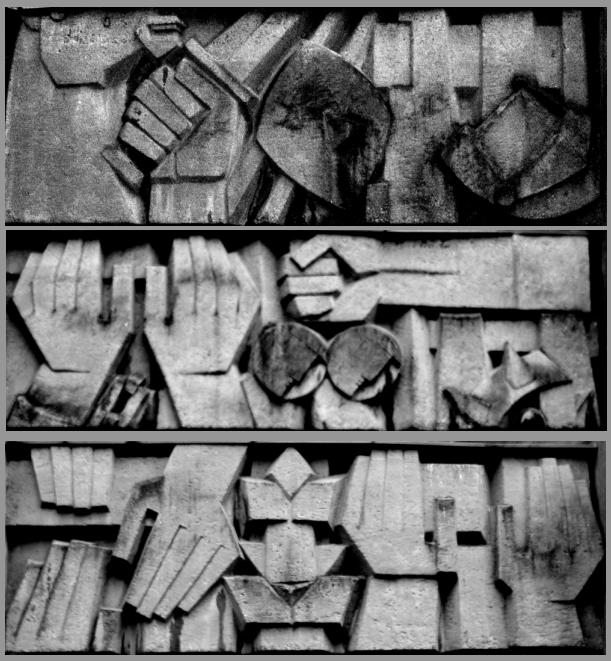
Work of Heinz Hemrich at St. Christoph, Mainz

Heinz Hemrich (1923 – 8 December 2009) was a German sculptor.

Born in Schwäbisch Hall, Hemrich performed military service (including a period in captivity) from 1942 to 1945. He studied from 1946 to 1951 at the Kunstschule Mainz (Art School Mainz), the Kunstakademie Stuttgart (Stuttgart Art Academy) and the Darmstädter Werkkunstschule (Arts and Crafts School in Darmstadt). From 1951 to 1953 he was assistant at the Technische Hochschule Darmstadt (Technical University of Darmstadt) and a freelance sculptor from 1953. In 1963 he took a teaching position at the Kunsthochschule Mainz (State University of Arts and Crafts Mainz). From 1973 he worked at the Johannes Gutenberg University in Mainz, first as a lecturer and later as a professor. Among his students was Karlheinz Oswald. Hemrich was from 1957 a member of the Darmstädter Sezession and participated in several of its exhibitions.

Hemrich executed numerous commissions for public buildings such as universities, churches and schools. His focus was Percent for Art and small sculptural works. In 1963/64 he created new concrete buttresses with symbolic representations of civic history for St. Christoph, Mainz, where Johannes Gutenberg was baptised and which was damaged in World War II. For the Protestant Auferstehungskirche (Resurrection Church) in Mainz, he took the late medieval motif of a pictured Bible and redesigned it as a concrete frieze.

== Literature ==
- Fritz Richard Barran: Kunst am Bau heute: Wandbild, Relief und Plastik in der Baukunst der Gegenwart, J. Hoffmann, 1964, p. 162
