= Ludwigshafen University of Applied Sciences =

Coordinates: 49.4805°N 8.4460°E

University of Applied Sciences Ludwigshafen
- Hochschule Ludwigshafen
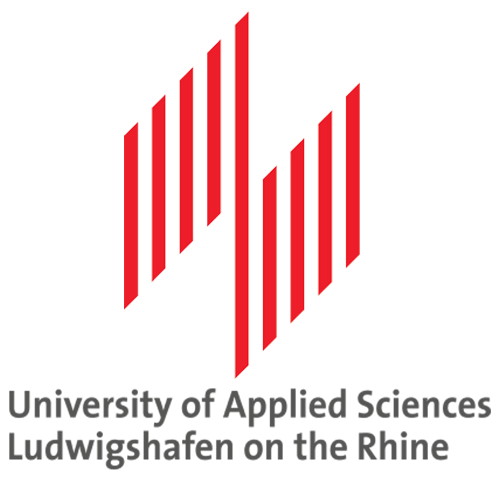
- Type: Public
- Established: 1965
- Chancellor: Carolin Nöhrbaß
- President: Peter Mudra
- Academic staff: 88 (2019)
- Administrative staff: 322 (2019)
- Students: 4674 (2019)
- Location: Ludwigshafen, Rhineland-Palatinate, Germany
- Website: Hochschule Ludwigshafen

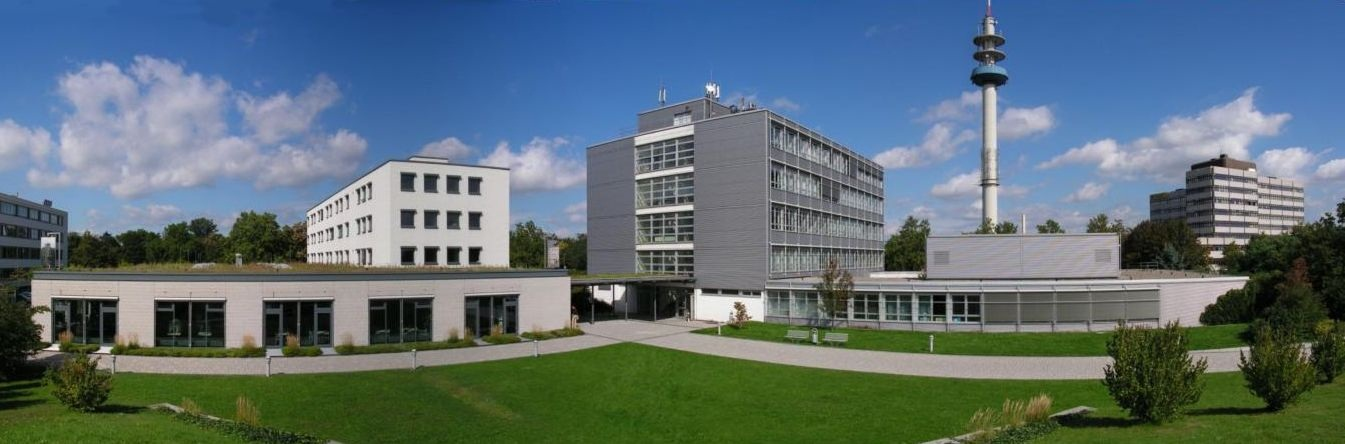
Panorama view of the campus

The University of Applied Sciences Ludwigshafen (German: Hochschule Ludwigshafen) is a public university located in Ludwigshafen, Germany. It was founded in 1965 as Higher School of Commerce Ludwigshafen. In 1971 it became part of the University of Applied Sciences Rhineland Palatinate, which split up into seven autonomous universities in 1991.

== History ==
The University of Applied Sciences Ludwigshafen was founded in 1965 as the Staatliche Höhere Wirtschaftsfachschule Ludwigshafen, which became part of the University of Applied Sciences Rhineland-Palatinate as the Ludwigshafen Department in 1971. In 1976, there was a merger with the Worms department, which lasted until 1991. The Ludwigshafen University of Applied Sciences became independent in 1996. In 2004, the changeover to Bachelor's and Master's degree programs took place.

The Protestant University of Applied Sciences Ludwigshafen was founded in 1948 as the Protestant School for Church and Social Service, was transformed into the Seminar for Social Professions - Higher Technical School for Social Work in 1964, and had been a university of applied sciences since 1971. The Evangelical Church withdrew from the sponsorship of the Evangelische Fachhochschule in 2007 for financial reasons.

In 2008, the two Ludwigshafen universities merged to form the new University of Applied Sciences Ludwigshafen am Rhein, which now focuses on business administration and social and health services.

As of 2012, the university officially renamed itself Ludwigshafen am Rhein University of Applied Sciences to reflect the 2008 merger, which expanded its portfolio, increased research activity, and the social status of the Fachhochschule type. However, it still has the status of a university of applied sciences.

A clearer emphasis on the university's focus is to be brought to bear by the formal renaming of Ludwigshafen University of Applied Sciences to Ludwigshafen University of Applied Sciences for Business and Society, which took place on January 1, 2019. The renaming was announced on September 25, 2018, as part of the 10th anniversary celebration of the merger between Ludwigshafen Protestant University of Applied Sciences and Ludwigshafen University of Applied Sciences.

== Studies and teaching ==
The university offers Bachelor's and Master's degrees in several areas of business administration and social affairs.

In addition to the classic full-time format, part-time and dual offers in the Bachelor and Master areas are currently playing a decisive role. There are the following selection of bachelor courses:

- Business Taxation and Auditing
- Business Controlling
- Financial Services and Corporate Finance
- International Business Management (East Asia)
- International Management Eastern Europe
- International Personnel Management and Organization
- Midwifery (dual)
- Logistics
- Marketing
- Nursing (dual)
- Nursing Education
- Social Work
- Business Informatics

== Central facilities ==
The Ludwigshafen University Library is largely designed as an open-access library and is spread over three branches. It holds 122000 books, 49700 e-books, 270 journals, 41250 e-journals (2019).

The Competence and Support Center E-Learning supports learners and teachers in questions of e-learning.

The Office for Studies and Teaching is the contact facility for teachers, administration and students.

The Department of International Affairs is responsible for international cooperation and the central coordination of our university’s foreign contacts. It serves as the contact facility for prospective international students, enrolled international students and exchange students from partner universities.

== Lecturers and alumni ==
Lecturers and former lecturers include the former German Minister for Economic Affairs and Energy Werner Müller.

Alumni of the university include the head of the SAP Global Labs Network Clas Neumann, the German politician Mario Brandenburg and the German high jumper Elena Herzenberg.

== See also ==
- East Asia Institute Ludwigshafen
- Ludwigshafen
- Rhine Neckar Area
- Electoral Palatinate
