= Mario Brandenburg =

German politician

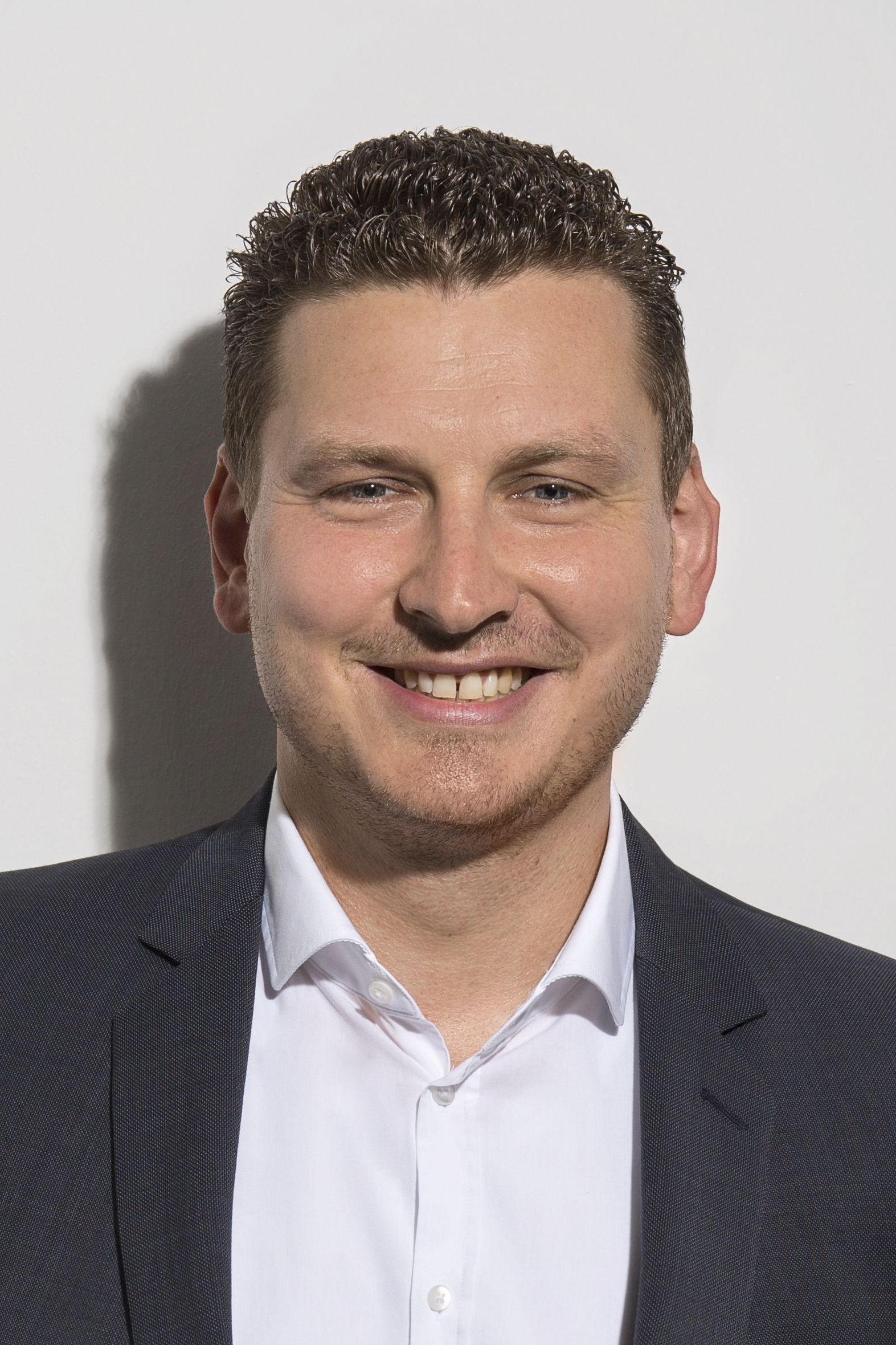
- Brandenburg in 2017

Member of the Bundestag
- In office 24 October 2017 – 2025
- Constituency: FDP List

Personal details
- Born: 3 October 1983 (age 43) Bad Bergzabern, West Germany
- Party: Free Democratic Party
- Children: 2
- Education: Karlsruhe University of Applied Sciences; Ludwigshafen University of Applied Sciences

Mario Brandenburg (born 3 October 1983) is a German computer scientist and politician of the Free Democratic Party (FDP) who served as a member of the Bundestag from the state of Rhineland-Palatinate from 2017 to 2025.

In addition to his parliamentary work, Brandenburg served as Parliamentary State Secretary to Federal Minister of Education and Research Bettina Stark-Watzinger from 2022 to 2024. In this capacity, he was also the Commissioner for Translational Research.

== Early life and career ==
Brandenburg studied business informatics at the University of Applied Sciences in Ludwigshafen and graduated with a master's degree (M.Sc.). Since then he has been employed at the software company SAP, where he first worked in software development, then in consulting and finally in international product sales.

== Political career ==
Brandenburg has been a member of the FDP since 2010.

Brandenburg first became a member of the Bundestag in the 2017 German federal election. In parliament, he joined the Committee on Education, Research and Technology Assessment (2017–2022) and also the Committee on Digital Affairs (2017–2021). He served as his parliamentary group's spokesperson on technology policy.

In the negotiations to form a so-called traffic light coalition of the Social Democratic Party (SPD), the Green Party and the FDP following the 2021 German elections, Brandenburg was part of his party's delegation in the working group on digital innovation and infrastructure, co-chaired by Jens Zimmermann, Malte Spitz and Andreas Pinkwart.

In April 2024 Brandenburg announced he is not seeking re-election for Bundestag.

== Other activities ==
- Fraunhofer Society, Ex-Officio Member of the Senate (since 2022)
- German Foundation for Peace Research (DSF), Ex-Officio Member of the Board (since 2022)
- Federal Agency for Disruptive Innovation (SPRIN-D), Member of the Supervisory Board (since 2022)
