= Georg Häfner =

German priest and martyr

Blessed Georg Häfner

Priest, Carmelite tertiary, Martyr
- Born: 19 October 1900; Würzburg, Germany
- Died: 20 August 1942 (aged 41); KZ Dachau, Germany
- Venerated in: Roman Catholic Church
- Beatified: May 15, 2011, Cathedral of Saint Kilian, Würzburg, Germany by Cardinal Angelo Amato, S.D.B
- Feast: 20 August

Joseph Georg Simon Häfner (19 October 1900, Würzburg – 20 August 1942, Dachau Concentration Camp) was a German Roman Catholic priest and martyr from the Diocese of Würzburg. On 15 May 2011 he was beatified in Würzburg Cathedral.

== Life ==
Georg Häfner came from humble origins – his father Valentin Häfner was a municipal worker. Georg Häfner was baptized in the cathedral parish, in 1918 he passed the exam for military school. However, his parents also allowed him to study theology and two years after beginning to do so, he joined the Third Order of Discalced Carmelites. On 13 April 1924 to Georg Häfner was ordained a priest and held his first mass at the Kloster Himmelspforten in Würzburg. This was followed by several terms as a chaplain, before he was appointed pastor of Oberschwarzach in Franconia in 1934.

Häfner refused to give the Nazi salute, which made him unpopular to the Nazi regime as chaplain of the Altglashuetten district of Wildflecken. From 1938 onwards he was banned from giving religious education at the local school in Oberschwarzach, meaning he had to hold first communion and confirmation classes in secret. Due to critical remarks against the Nazi regime in his teaching and preaching – he is said to have referred to them, among other things, as "brown dung beetles" – he was frequently arrested and questioned by the Gestapo.

In August 1941 a seriously-ill member of the Nazi party asked Häfner to come to give him the last rites. Häfner came as requested, but left the party-member to sign a deathbed confession that his second civil-ceremony marriage was invalid before God and his conscience. After reading a statement in church the following Sunday that the man was to be buried in church, Häfner was denounced by a second party member and arrested by the Gestapo. He was initially held in the Gestapo prison in Würzburg. Although Vicar-General Franz Miltenberger interceded for him, Häfner was moved to the so-called 'priest block' at Dachau on 12 December 1941 without a court-order. His prisoner number was 28876. He died there on 20 August 1942 from the effects of abuse and malnutrition. He was buried in the priests' section of Würzburg's Hauptfriedhof cemetery on 18 September 1942.

== Beatification ==
On 9 December 1942, in the presence of bishop Paul-Werner Scheele, Häfner's remains were moved into the crypt of the Neumünsterkirche. The episcopal survey on his beatification took place from 23 July 1992 to 31 May 2002. On 3 July 2009 pope Benedict XVI issued a decree stating that Häfner was a martyr. On 8 September 2010 bishop Friedhelm Hofmann and the postulator of the beatification process, dean Msgr. Günter Putz, announced that the beatification ceremony would occur on 15 May 2011 at the Kiliansdom in Würzburg – its motto would be "simple, believing, consistent".

== Other honours ==
The Monteverdichor Würzburg dedicated its concert 'The Beatitudes', held on 16 and 17 July 2010, to Häfner. In March 2011 the Egbert-Gymnasium Münsterschwarzach premiered a scenic oratorio entitled "Häfner – a decision". A square on the corner of Östlichen Bockgasse in Würzburg, near his childhood home, was renamed after Häfner in 2011. He is also commemorated by a stolpersteine in front of the Neumünster in Würzburg.

== Works ==
- Georg Häfner 1900–1945. Hrsg. Diözesanarchiv Würzburg. Würzburg 2011.

== Bibliography ==
- Putz, Günter: Gott ist der Grund. Das Lebenszeugnis von Georg Häfner. Einsichten in das Priesteramt. Echter-Verlag, Würzburg 2000, ISBN 3-429-02198-7
- Putz, Günter: Opferfrucht. Der selige Georg Häfner (1900–1942). Echter-Verlag, Würzburg 2013, ISBN 978-3-429-03573-0
- Scheele, Paul-Werner; Wittstadt, Klaus: Georg Häfner. Priester und Opfer. Briefe aus der Haft. Gestapodokumente. Echter-Verlag, Würzburg 1983, ISBN 3-429-00838-7
