= St. Christoph's Church, Mainz =

Church building in Mainz, Germany

Coordinates: 50°00′07″N 8°16′20″E

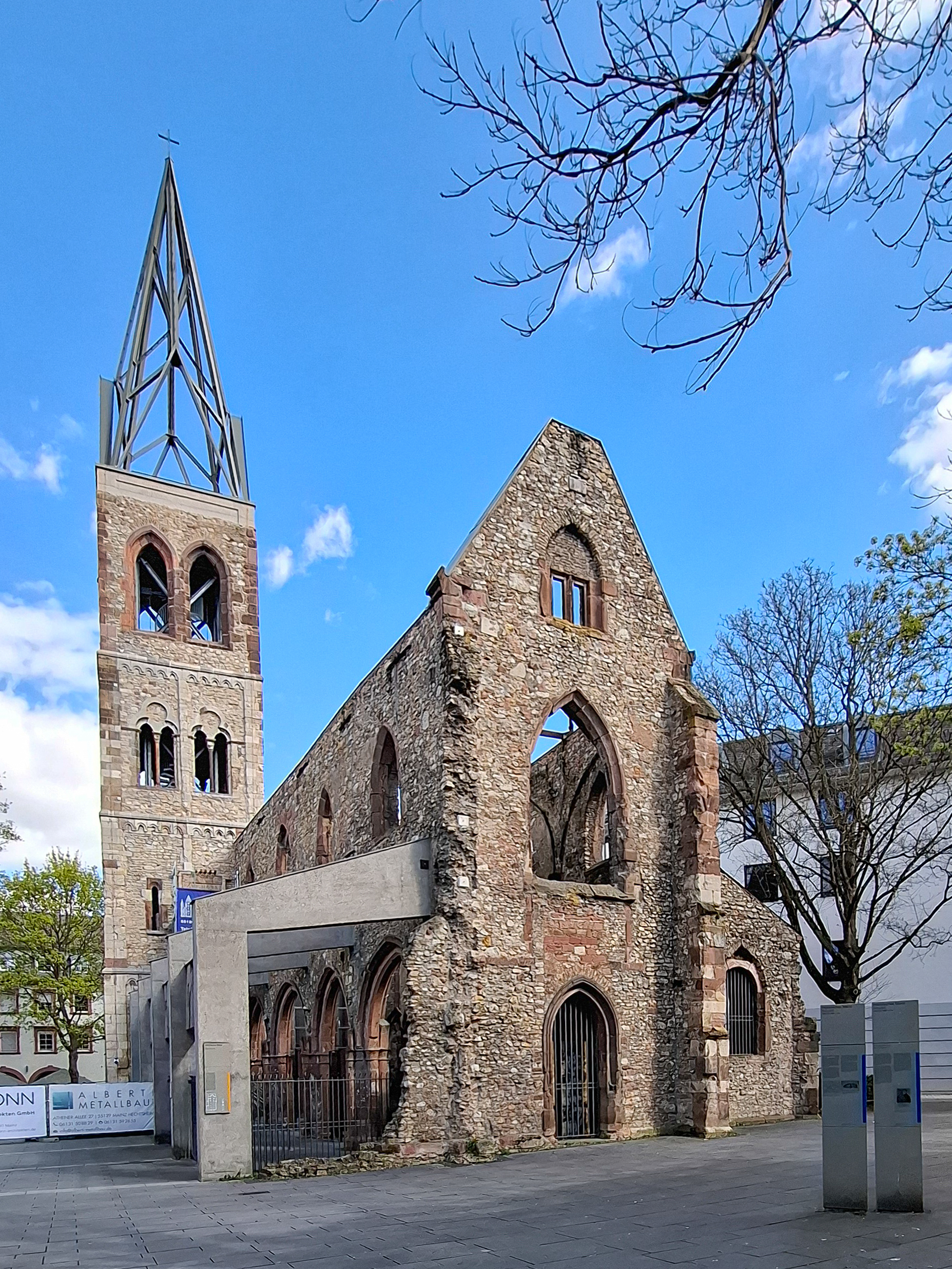
The ruins of St. Christoph at Mainz. World War II memorial and a symbol of the destroyed Mainz, Parish Church of Johannes Gutenberg

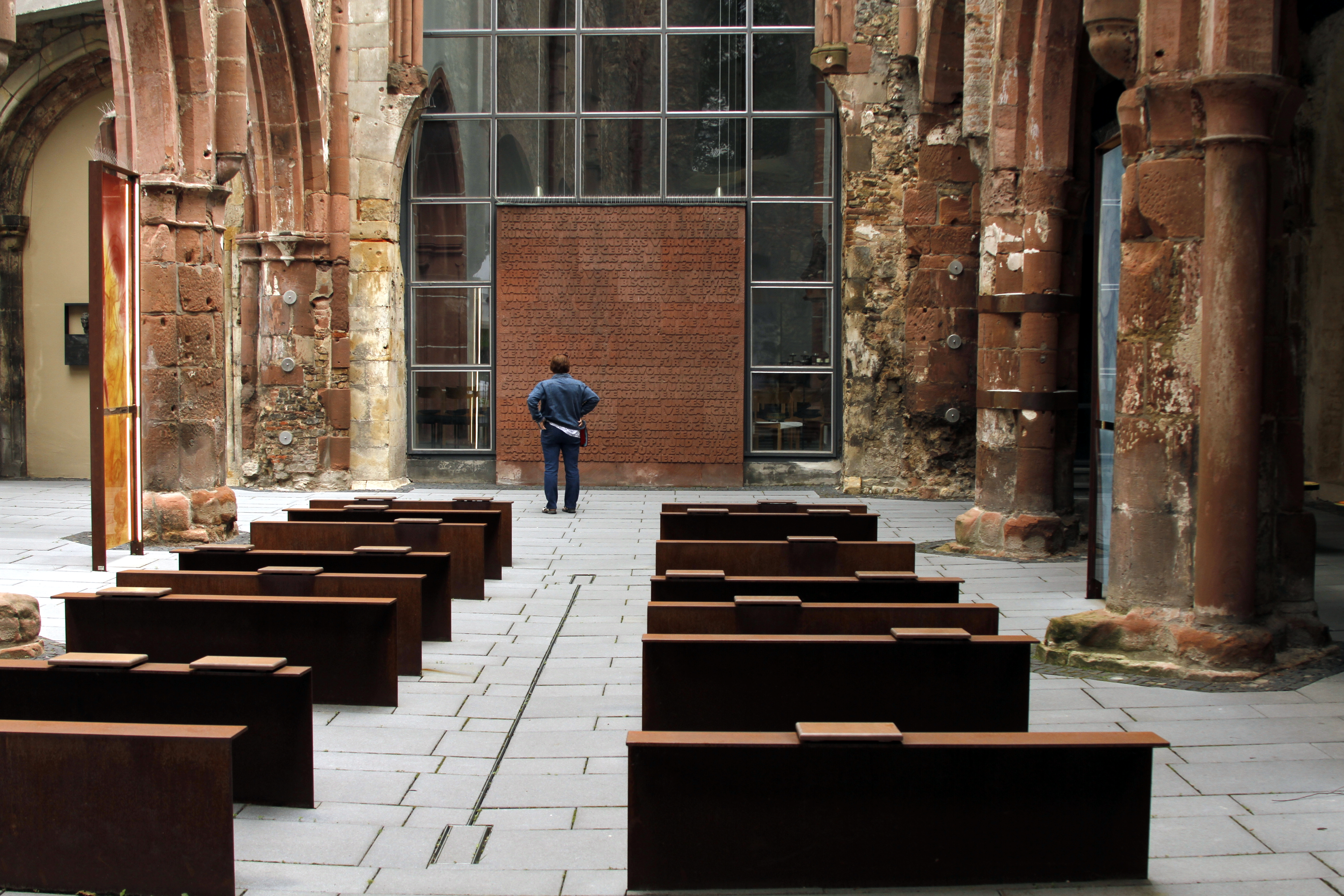
Interior

The church of St. Christoph in Mainz, known in German as St. Christoph zu Mainz, is an example of early gothic architecture. St. Christoph was originally built between 1240 and 1330. The church is associated with Johannes Gutenberg, who may have been baptised there.

It had been erected in Christofstraße in the historic city centre of Mainz and adjacent to the Karmeliterplatz. Its ruins represent the central war memorial in the city of Mainz, in memory of the victims and the destruction of the city in World War II, such as the bombing of Mainz on 27 February 1945.

== History ==
The former parish church was mentioned for the first time in documents of 893. In a document by Pope Innocent II in the year 1140 the patronage of St. Maximin's Abbey, Trier was laid down.

Except for its Romanesque tower with pairings of two arched windows, dating from around 1240, the present building dates from the decades around 1280 until the 1330. In the 17th and 18th century, the church was renovated and redesigned in Baroque architecture.

Peter Canisius joined the Society of Jesus effective on 8 May 1543 as the eighth person and placed his vow in the rectory of St. Christopher. In 1762 the church was renovated.

During World War II it was razed except for the external walls. During the great air raid on Mainz on 12 and 13 August 1942 St. Christopher burned down, whereas a renewed bombing on 27 February 1945 with tactical demolition bombs brought the vaults to collapse. The outer walls have been restored and protected on the north side by concrete columns. The new buttresses have been provided with a relief by the Mainz sculptor Heinz Hemrich carrying symbolic representations of the city's history. The church now is designed as a war memorial. A commemorative plaque in the floor tells the embedded text ″Den Toten zum Gedenken/ Den Lebenden zur Mahnung″ ″In memory of the dead / as a reminder for the Living".

Right next to the church stands the most modern Gutenberg statue of the city. It was created to celebrate the year 2000 Gutenberg celebrations of Mainz by sculptor Karl Heinz Oswald. The iron sculpture displays the Gutenberg printing press. Gutenberg used for printing a wooden press, reminiscent of construction, mechanics and operation of a wine press. The windows in the chancel and the glass wall in the chancel were designed by Alois Plum.

In the eastern chancel, a chapel has been renovated, including a baptistry in the south transept, and a sacristy in the ground floor of the Romanesque tower. In this chapel, windows by the Mainz glass artist Alois Plum have been installed. The chapel is owned by the Roman Catholic Diocese of Mainz, while the remaining ruins (including the tower above the sacristy) are owned and maintained by the City of Mainz.

Beginning in 2020, weekly ecumenical prayers for peace in the tradition of the Coventry Cross of Nails are offered in the chapel on Fridays at 5 p.m. Additional worship services are conducted at various times by the Roman Catholic urban ministry Cityseelsorge, as well as the Old Catholic Church and Episcopal Church.

=== Preserved decorations ===
- The oldest organ in the Roman Catholic Diocese of Mainz, surviving in parts, which was built in 1667 by Johann Peter Geissel for St. Christopher's Church in Mainz, was sold after 1773 to Gau-Bischofsheim, where it stands today in the parish church.
- In the eastern part of the church is a Gothic baptismal font, which is supported by four lion heads, dating back to the time of Gutenberg.
- A Rococo sculpture of St. Valentine was rescued in the chaos of the war and was taken to the Carmelite Church. The Valentines pilgrimage was translocated just as well.

=== Lost decorations ===
- Since 1792, a miracle cross from around 1300 had been kept at St. Christoph's.
