= East Asia Institute (Ludwigshafen) =

Coordinates: 49°28′43″N 8°27′23″E

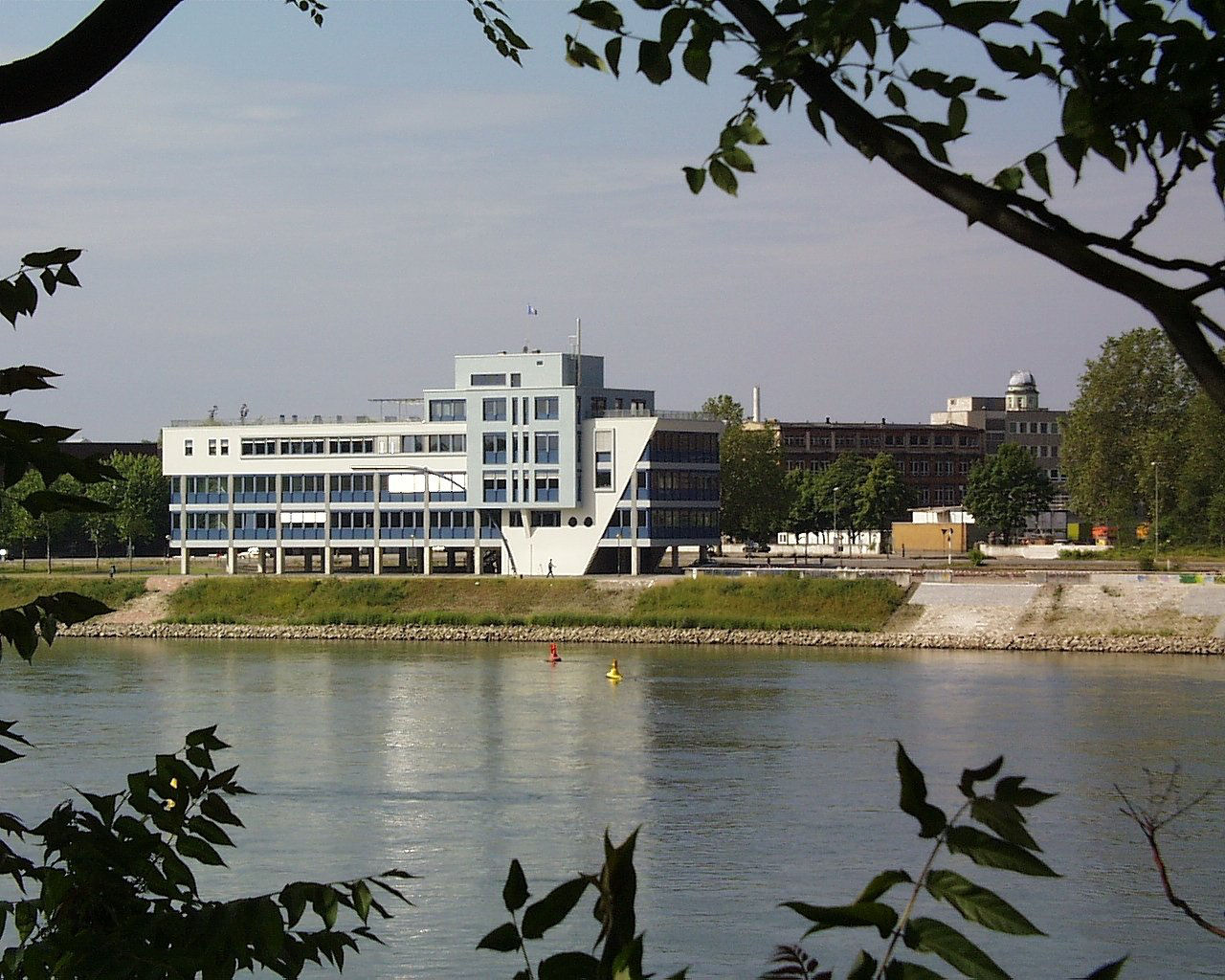
East Asia Institute at the Rhine River in Ludwigshafen

The East Asia Institute (German: Ostasieninstitut) is a public research centre, founded in 1989 as part of the Ludwigshafen University of Applied Sciences. It offers four year or eight-semester programs (BA) in international business management, supplemented with cultural and language studies in China, Japan, or Korea-related topics and regions.

== Name ==
English: East Asia Institute
French: Institut pour l'Asie de l'est
German: Ostasieninstitut
Russian: Институт Восточной Азии (Institut Wostotschnoiy Azii)

Chinese: 东亚学院 (Dongya Xueyuan)
Japanese: 東アジアセンター (Higashi Ajia Senta)
Korean: 동아시아연구소 (Dong-Asia Yeonguso)

== Activities and mission ==
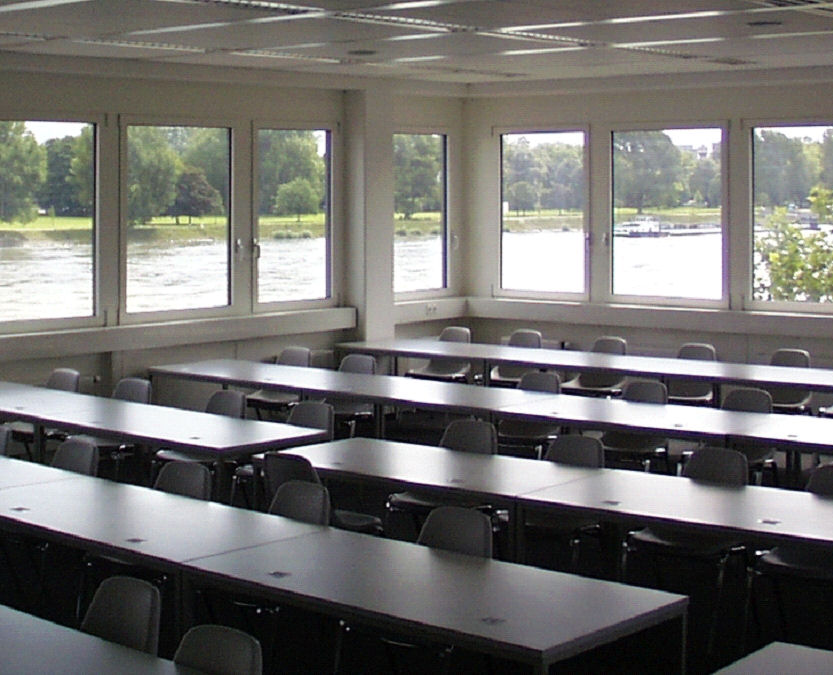
interior of the institute

The Institute provides international business management programs, with a large focus on cultural and language studies in modern China, Japan, and Korea. Publications and research tend to cover various social science disciplines related to current events developing in the regions.

The core faculty of the Institute currently consists of about 15 permanent staff members that participate in teaching and active research. The Institute benefits from a steady partnership with many universities in Asia who send students to study abroad, as well as business consulting MSEs and companies active in East Asia.

== Study abroad ==
Depending on the country module chosen, students spend one year (5th and 6th semesters) in China, Korea, or Japan studying at one of the affiliated universities. Students may elect to complement their studies by completing an apprenticeship.

The East Asia Institute has partnerships to the following institutions in the People's Republic of China, Korea and Japan:

1. Fuzhou University in Fuzhou, Fujian
2. Guangxi University in Nanning, Guangxi
3. Guilin University of Electronic Technology in Guilin, Guangxi
4. Guizhou University in Guiyang, Guizhou
5. Hebei North University in Zhangjiakou, Hebei
6. Takasaki Economics University in Takasaki, Gunma
7. Kansai Gaidai in Hirakata, Osaka
8. Akita International University in Akita, Akita
9. Nagoya City University in Nagoya, Aichi
10. Konkuk University in Seoul
11. Korea University in Sejong
12. Kyonggi University in Seoul
13. Pukyong National University in Busan
14. Seoul National University of Science and Technology in Seoul

== Student life ==
Enrollment in the program is limited, resulting in small cohorts of selected students who largely stay together for the duration of their studies.

StEAM (Students of East Asia Marketing) is a student association which contributes to student life by promoting cultural and social events.

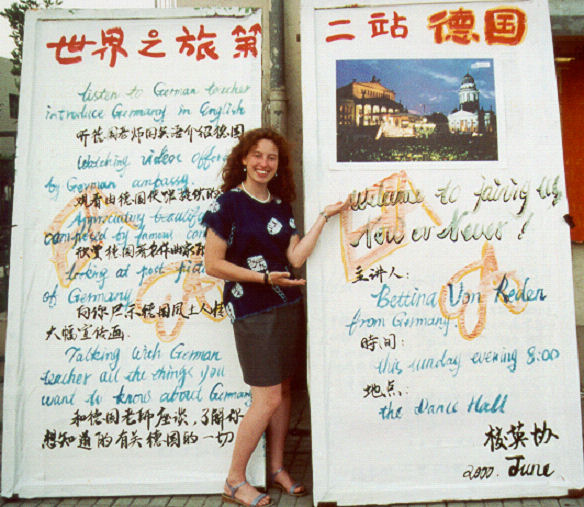
presenting Germany in China

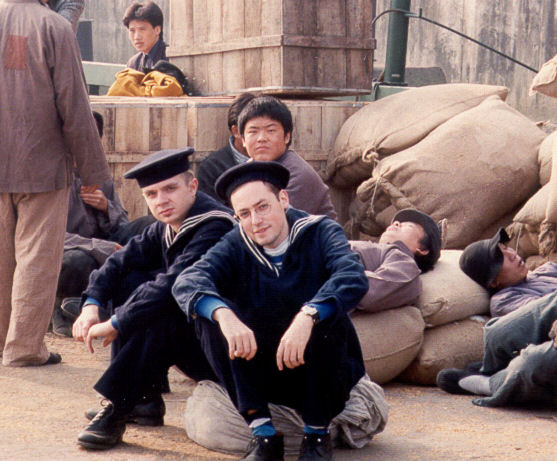
movie walk-ons in China

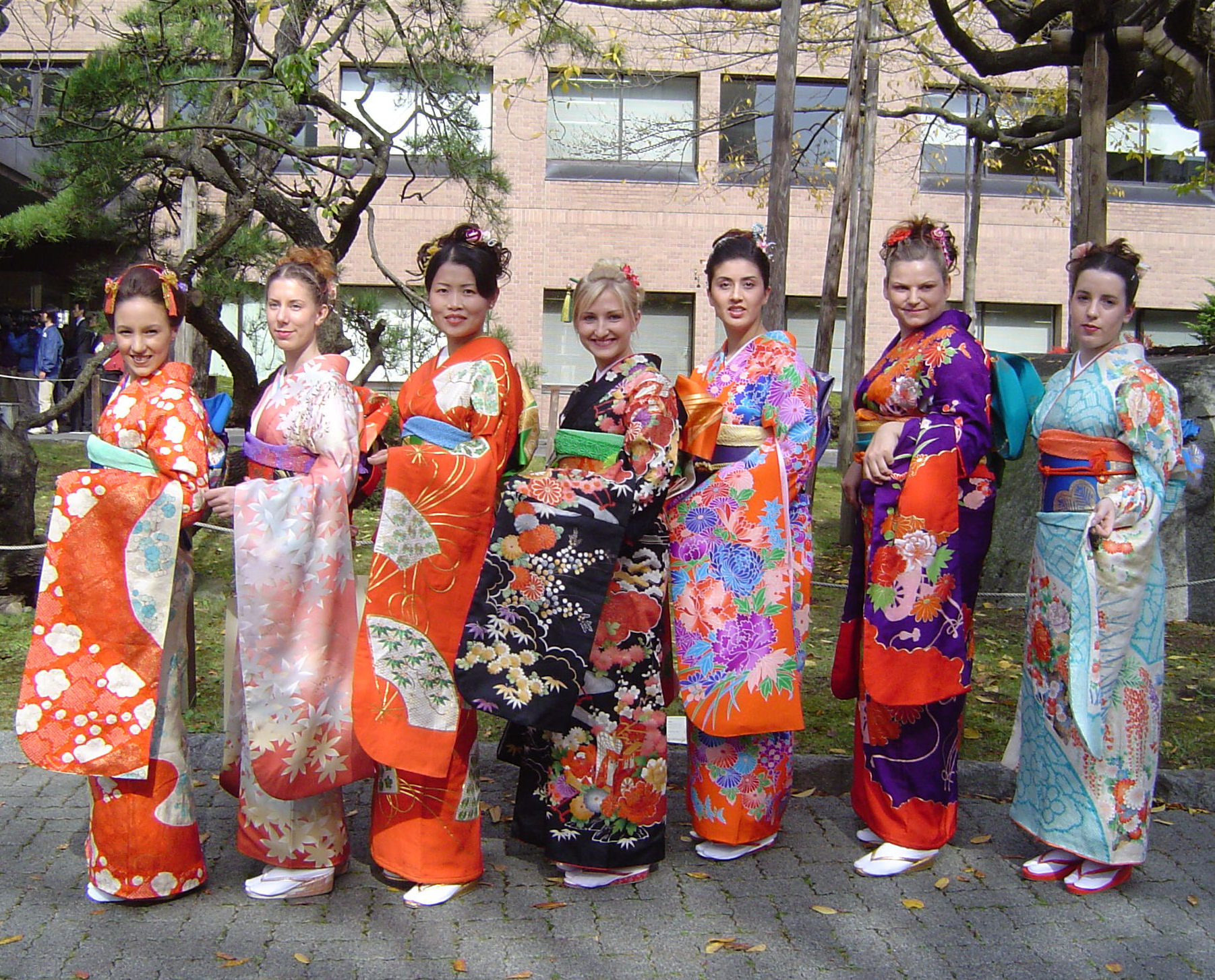
students in Japan

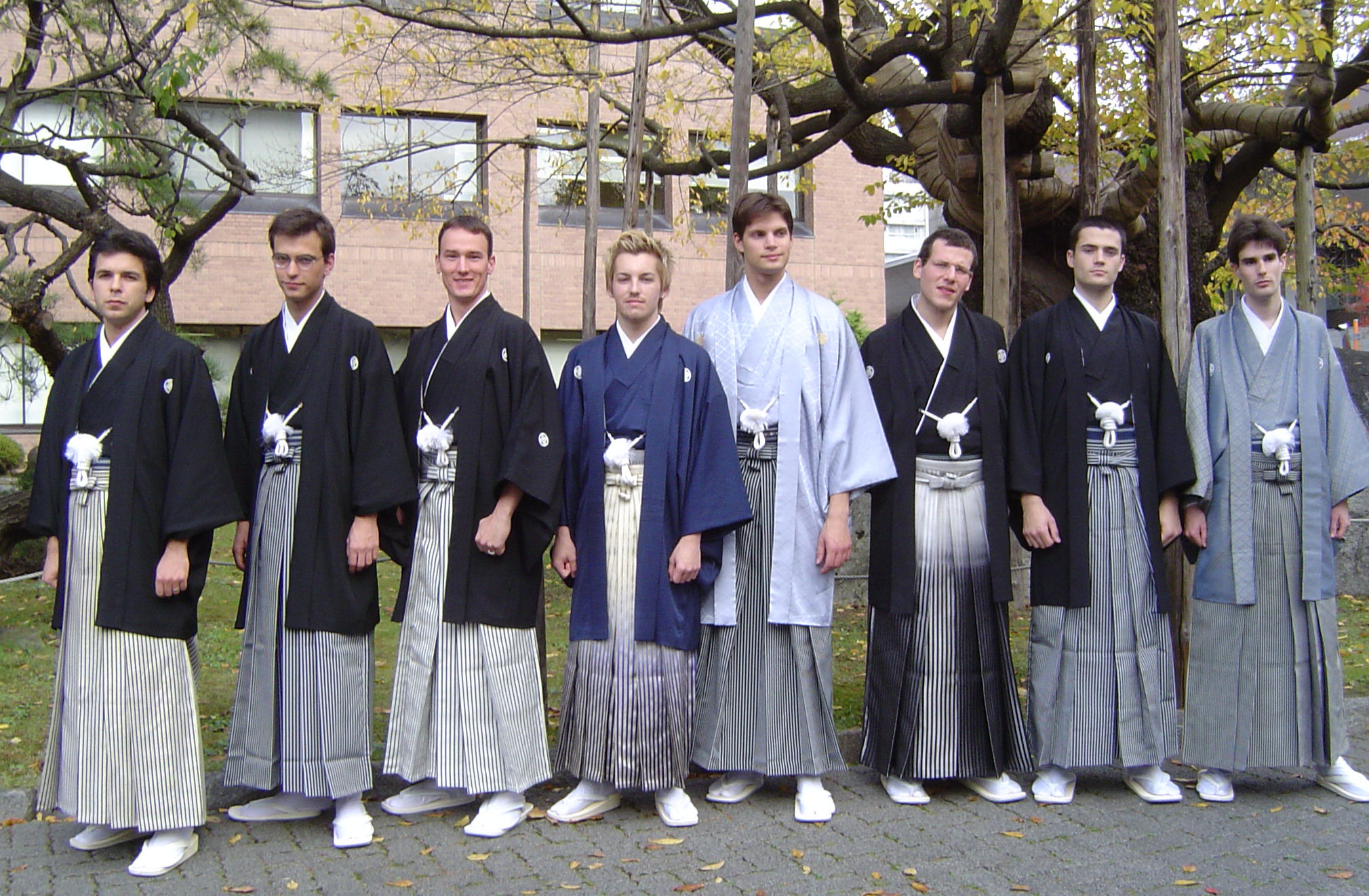
students in Japan

== History ==
In 1989, professor Siegfried Englert founded the model degree program Marketing East Asia as a part of the University of Applied Science in Ludwigshafen, Germany. The program offered a combination of business administration courses with Chinese cultural and language studies. In 1992, the program expanded into a regular degree and included a focus on Japan. Korean studies would later be included in 2016.

In 1997, the program was renamed the East Asia Institute and moved in a new building constructed on the banks of the Rhine River. In 2004, the diploma was converted into the current Bachelor degree program.

The Institute has received visits from notable political figures since moving into the Rhine building, including German federal presidents Roman Herzog in 1997 and Johannes Rau in 2000. Discussions took place with former Japanese prime minister Naoto Kan in 2015.

== See also ==
- East Asian studies
