= Neckaruferbebauung Nord =

Skyscraper complex in Mannheim, Germany

- Neckarpromenade Wohnturm (German)
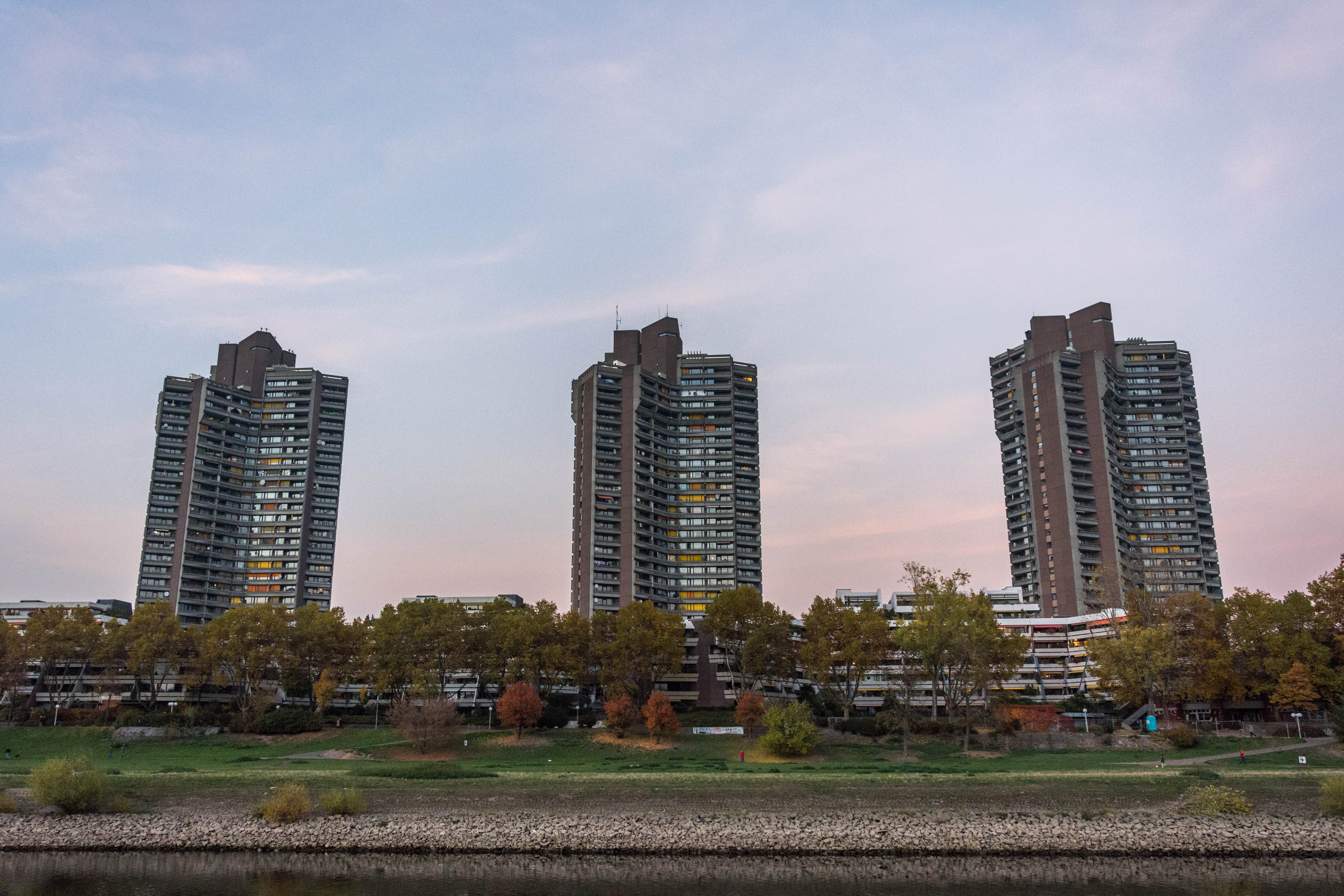

General information
- Status: Completed
- Type: Residential
- Architectural style: Brutalist
- Location: Mannheim, Germany, 9, 15, 25 Neckarpromenade, 68167 Mannheim, Germany
- Coordinates: 49.49438°N 8.47742°E
- Completed: 1975

Height
- Roof: 100 m (330 ft)

Technical details
- Structural system: Concrete
- Floor count: 30

Design and construction
- Architect: Karl Schmucker

The Neckaruferbebauung Nord, also stylized as NUB (and also known as the Neckarpromenade) is a high-rise residential complex in the Neckarstadt-Ost district of Mannheim, Germany. Inaugurated in 1975, the complex consists of three identical towers standing at 100 m (330 ft) with 30 floors each, sharing the second position in the tallest buildings in Mannheim skyline.

== History ==
=== Planning ===
The complex is located on the northern bank of the Neckar River between Kurpfalzbrücke and Friedrich-Ebert-Brücke with three high-rise buildings, terraced houses facing the Neckar and various school buildings. The planning for the redesign of the Neckar river bank began in the 1960s. According to the proposal of the Mannheim architect Karl Schmucker, the Neckarstadt and the city center were to be more closely connected through modern, urban development with office and residential high-rises in airy and green surroundings. Initially, the plan was to build four high-rises, with the highest tower at the Alter Meßplatz. However, only three high-rises were built in several phases between 1975 and 1982. The demolition of the Alte Feuerwache was therefore dispensed with.

=== Architecture ===
The three residential towers with a star-shaped floor plan were designed by the Mannheim architects Einald Sandreuther, Werner Single and Norbert Schultes for the former housing association Neue Heimat and are intended to provide space for as many apartments as possible in a small area. Supply shafts and elevators are located centrally and tower above the other parts of the building. The three high-rise buildings were purchased in 2007 by the Blackstone Group, which sold them to Grand City Properties in 2014.

To the south of the Neckar river bank, four terraced houses with 355 condominiums are arranged in a long complex. A central pedestrian level, supported by a parking garage level at ground level, provides access to all buildings and, via the Neckarsteg, to the Collini Center. The street "Neckarpromenade" runs through the ground floor of the complex.

The Carl Benz School and the Werner von Siemens School are integrated into the complex on the north side, as well as the FORUM youth culture center and the Justus von Liebig School directly next to them. The children's home of the city of Mannheim is connected to the second terraced house.

=== Development awards ===
- 1980 – Association of German Architects – Competition “Living in Urban Density”
- 1980 – Association of German Architects / State winner – Competition “Living on the outskirts of the city with inner-city construction measures”
- 1981 – Association of German Landscape Architects – Competition “Pedestrian Zones and Traffic Calmed Zones”
- 1981 – Association of German Architects for Youth Culture Center forum

== Gallery ==
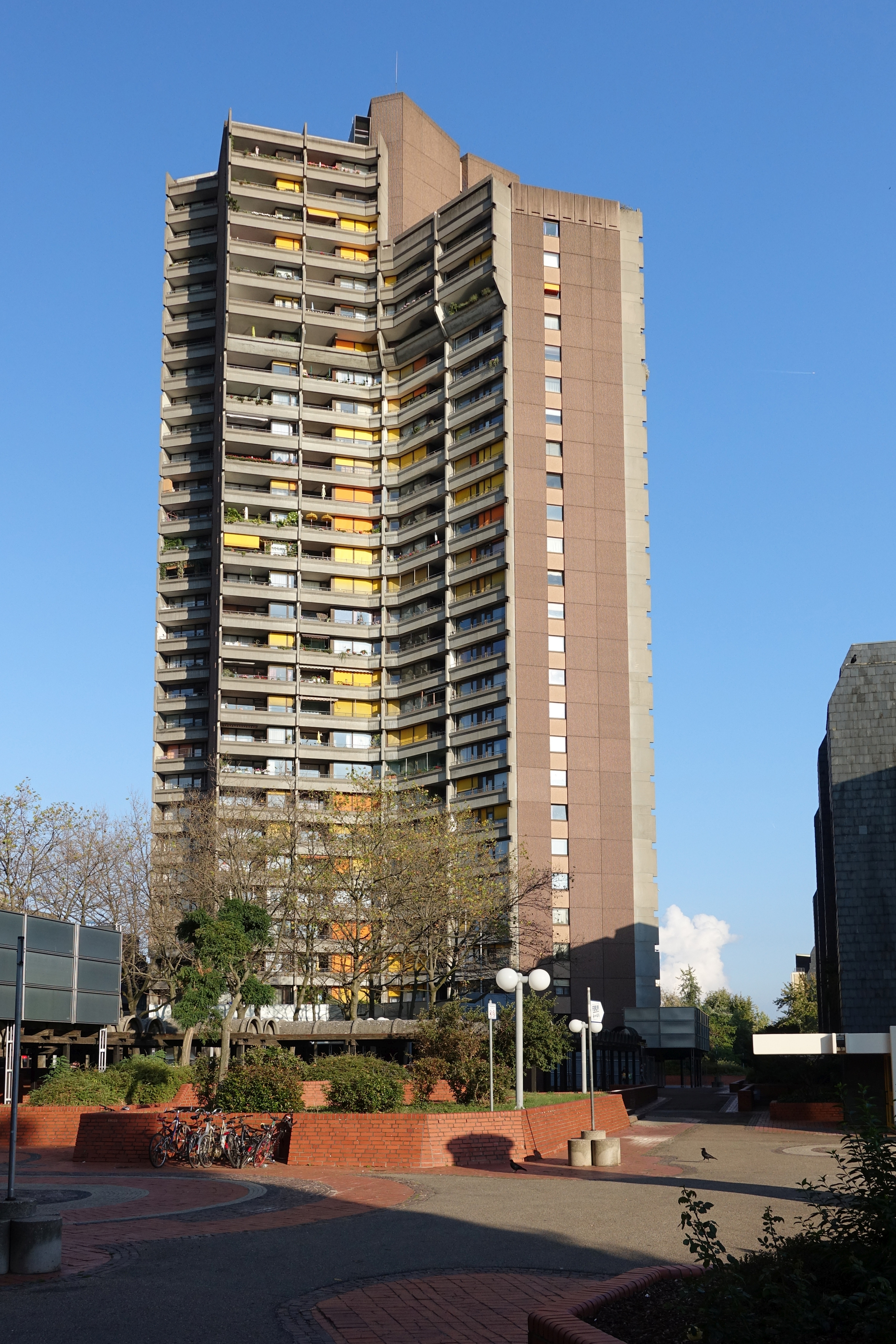
Tower façade and exterior

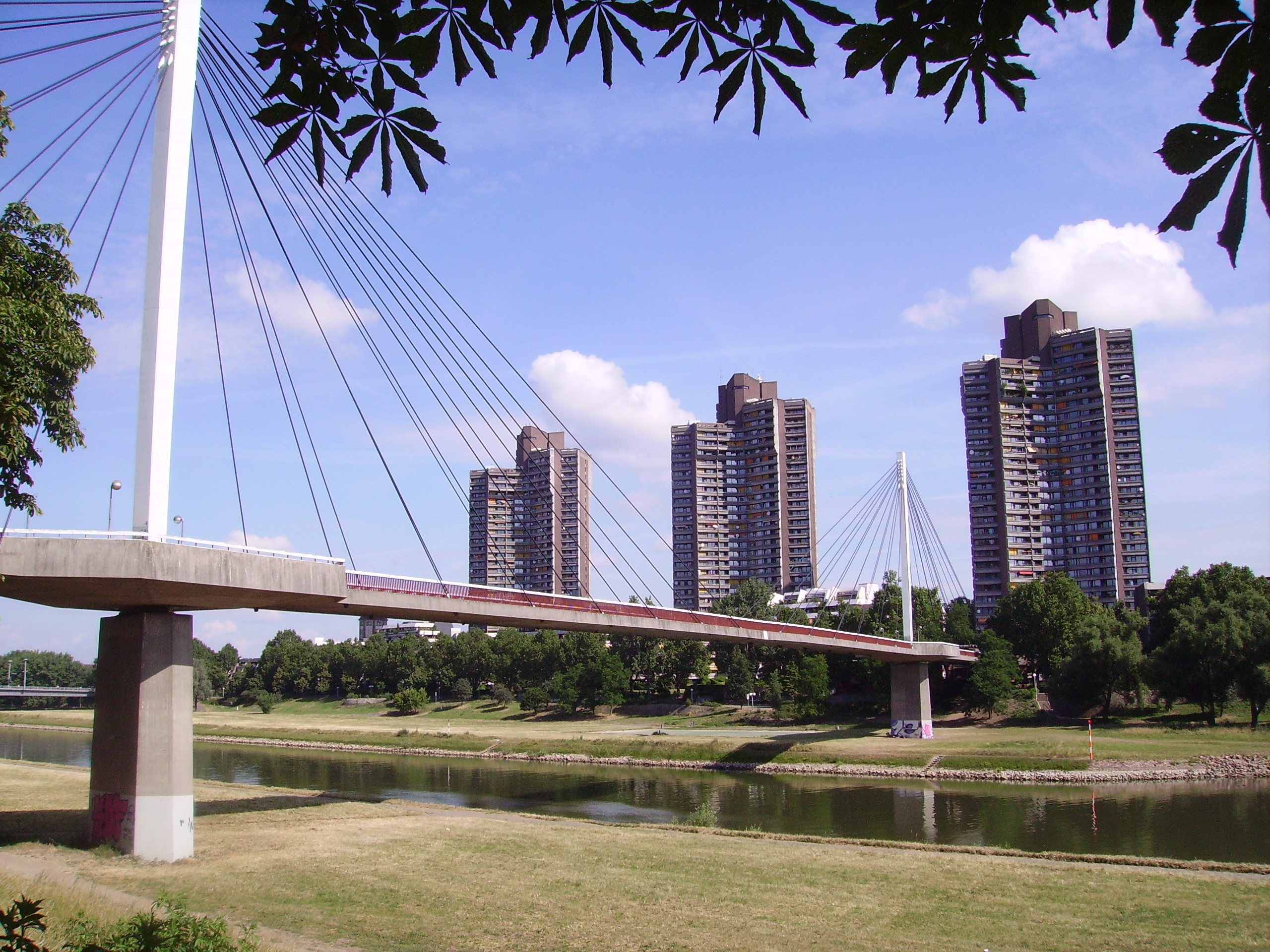
Neckar riverside development with Neckar Bridge

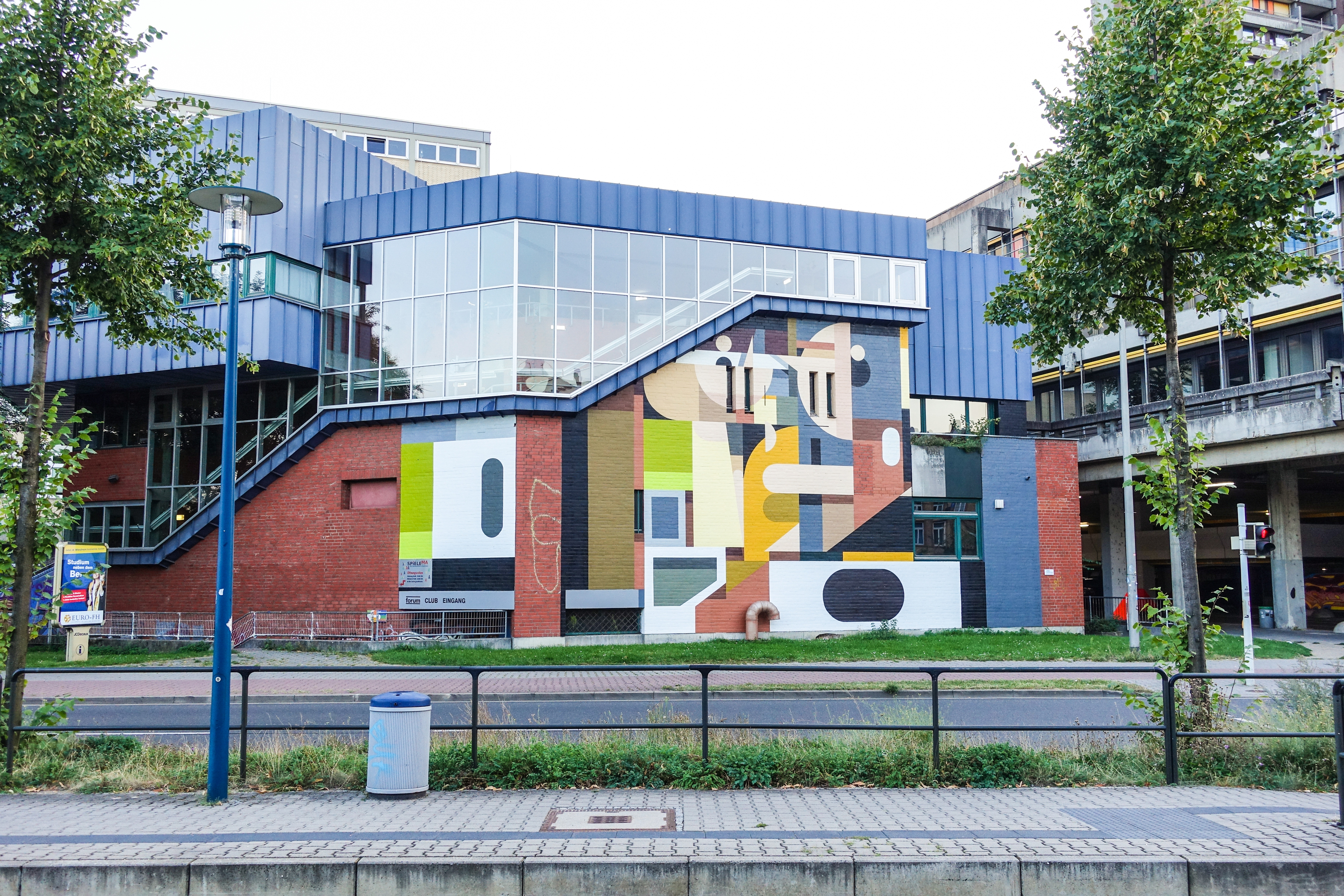
youth culture center FORUM

== See also ==
- List of tallest buildings in Mannheim
- List of tallest buildings in Germany
