= List of tallest buildings in Mannheim =

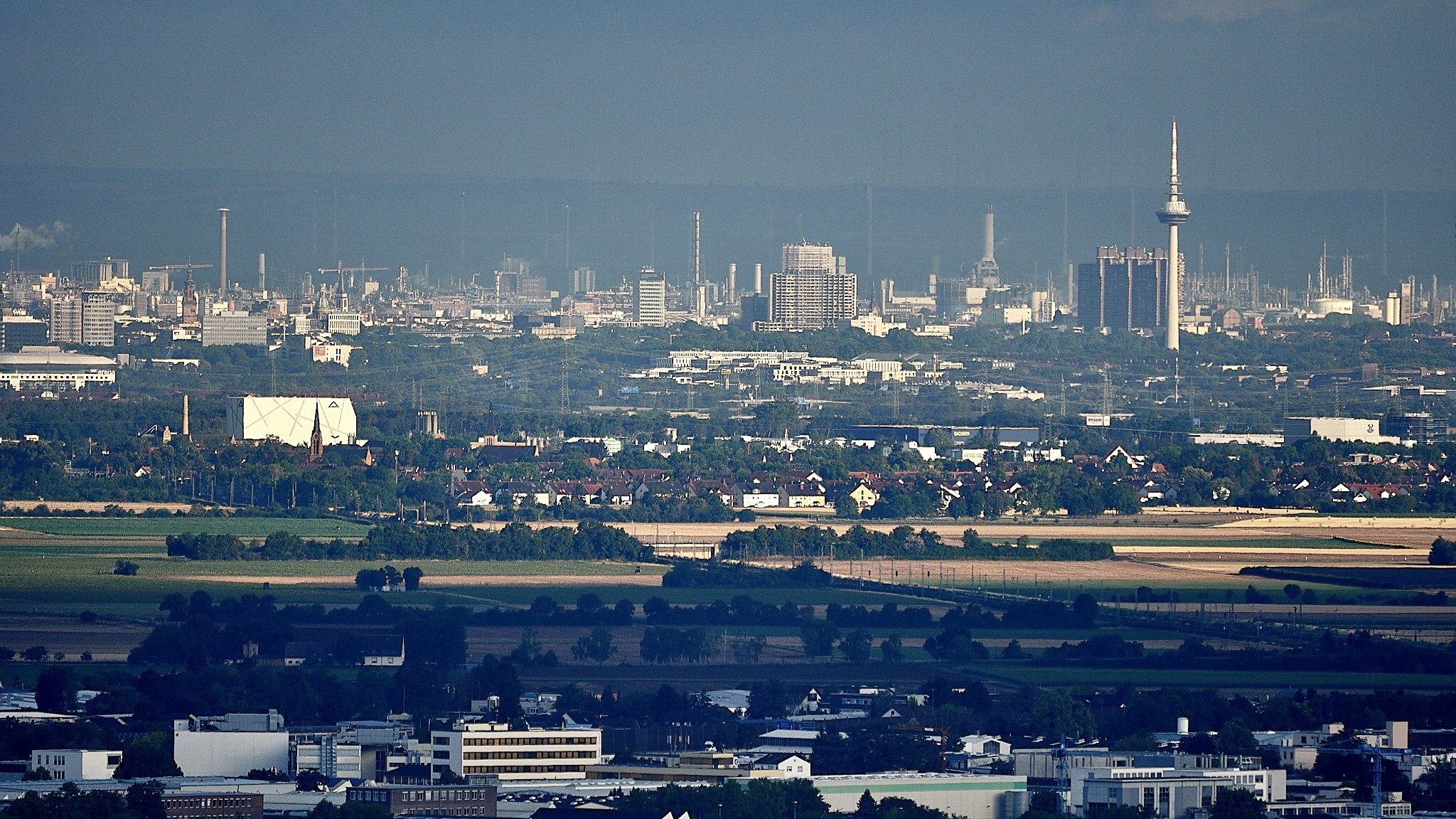
Mannheim "Skyline"

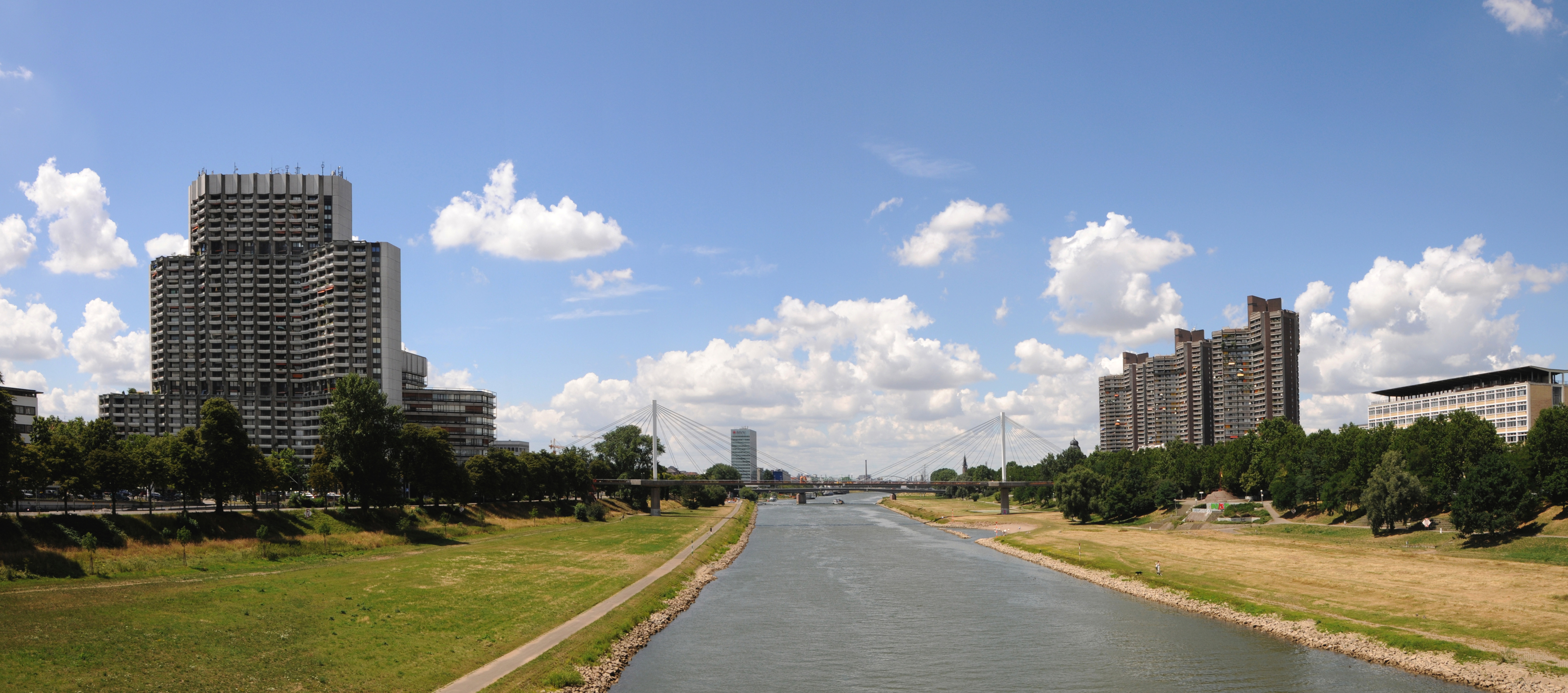
From left to right: Collini-Center, MVV-Hochhaus and Neckarpromenade

This list of tallest buildings in Mannheim ranks high-rise buildings and important landmarks that reach a height of 50 meters (164 feet). The tallest structure in the city is the 217.8-meter-high Fernmeldeturm Mannheim, a television tower built in 1975.

Mannheim's tallest buildings are located along both sides of the Neckar river. The city differs from most other cities in Baden-Württemberg in that it has a higher density of high-rise buildings. For example, 5 of the 6 tallest skyscrapers in the state are located in Mannheim. The same applies to the cityscape of its Rhineland-Palatinate sister city Ludwigshafen am Rhein, with the result that some of the high-rises in both cities near the Rhine form a joint ensemble.

Rank	Name	Image	Height m (ft)	Floors	Year completed	Use / Note
	Fernmeldeturm Mannheim		217.8 m (715 ft)		1975	Telecommunications tower, Tallest structure in Mannheim.
1	Collini Center		102 m (335 ft)	32	1975	Tallest high-rise buildings in Mannheim
2	Neckaruferbebauung Nord 1		100 m (328 ft)	30	1975	Residential
3	Neckaruferbebauung Nord 2		100 m (328 ft)	30	1975	Residential
4	Neckaruferbebauung Nord 3		100 m (328 ft)	30	1975	Residential
5	Victoria Turm		97 m (318 ft)	27	2001	Office
	Konkordienkirche		86.93 m (285 ft)		1717	Tallest church tower of Mannheim
6	Geraer Ring 10		86 m (282 ft)	24	1967	Residential
7	Freiberger Ring 3		83 m (272 ft)	23	1967	Residential
8	Geraer Ring 2		83 m (272 ft)	23	1967	Residential
	Jesuitenkirche		74 m (243 ft)		1760	
	Christuskirche		65 m (213 ft)		1911	
9	Hauptgebäude der Mannheimer Versicherung		65 m (213 ft)	15	1991	Headquarters of Mannheimer Versicherung (insurance)
10	MVV-Hochhaus		61 m (200 ft)	17	1961	Seat of MVV Energie
	Mannheim Water Tower		60 m (197 ft)		1889	
11	Neues Technisches Rathaus		56 m (184 ft)	14	2021	New technical town hall
12	No. 1		53 m (174 ft)	15	2019	Office
12	Hoch 4		53 m (174 ft)	13	2020	Office
12	Loksite Glückstein-Quartier		52.5 m (172 ft)	12	2024	Office
14	"E" Franklin Quartier		52 m (171 ft)	15	2023	Residential
15	Haus Oberrhein		50 m (164 ft)	14	1959	Office
15	"O" Franklin Quartier		50 m (164 ft)	15	2025	Residential
17	"H" Franklin Quartier		48 m (157 ft)	14	2025	Residential

== Under Construction ==
Name	Height (m)	Height (ft)	Floors	Year

== Proposed ==
Name	Height (m)	Height (ft)	Floors	Year
Augustaanlage 65/67	65	213	17	Unknown
"M" Franklin Quartier	50	164	15	Unknown

== See also ==
- List of tallest buildings in Germany
- List of tallest structures in Germany
