= Collini Center =

Skyscraper in Mannheim, Germany

- Appartment-Hochhaus am Collini-Center (German)
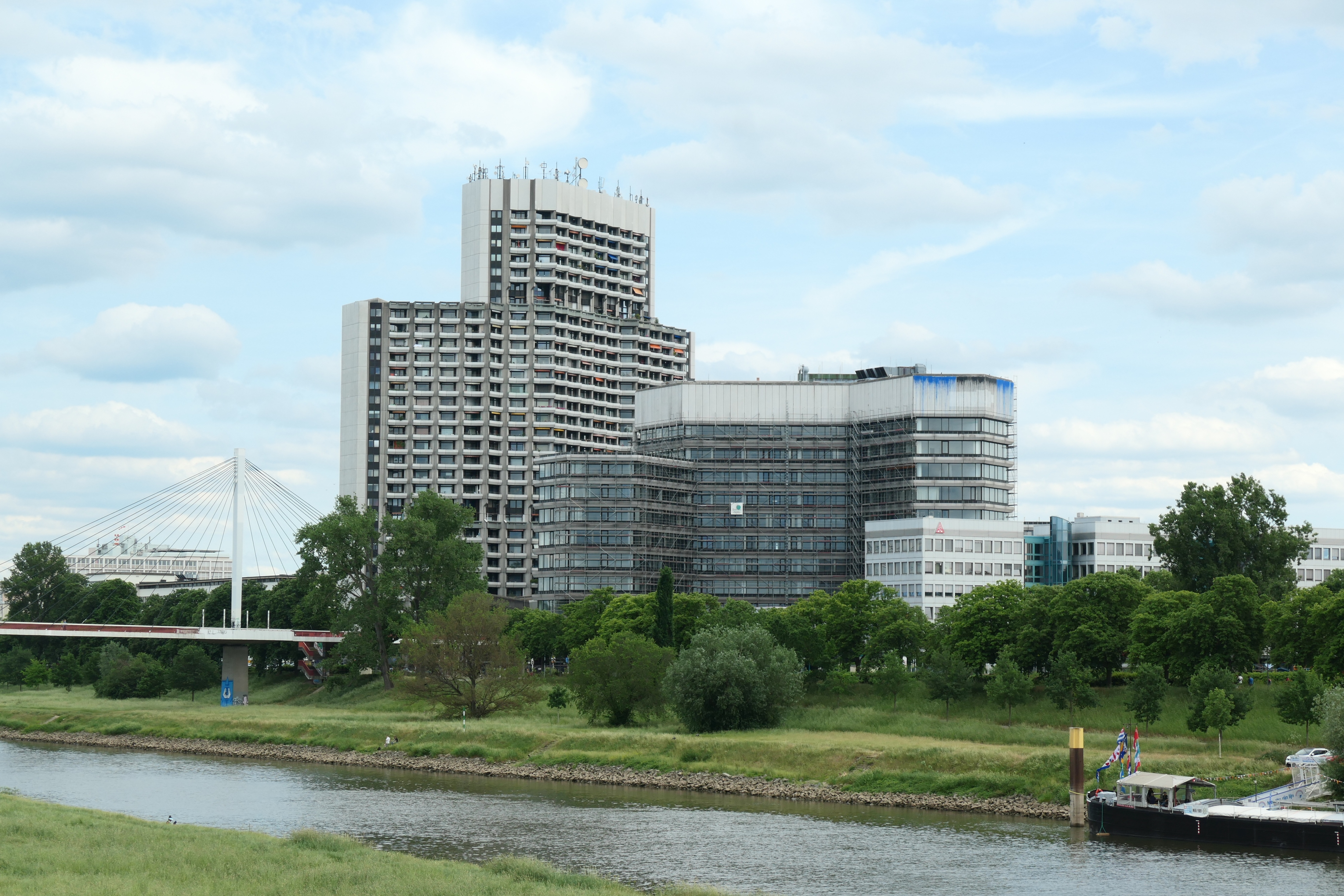
- Interactive map of the Collini Center area

General information
- Status: Completed
- Type: Mixed-use: Residential / Office
- Architectural style: Brutalist
- Location: Mannheim, Germany, 5 Collinistraße, Mannheim, Germany
- Coordinates: 49.49095°N 8.47712°E
- Construction started: 1972
- Completed: 1975

Height
- Roof: 102 m (335 ft)

Technical details
- Structural system: Concrete
- Floor count: 32

Design and construction
- Architect: Karl Schmucker

The Collini Center (German: Appartment-Hochhaus am Collini-Center) is a high-rise residential complex in Mannheim, Germany. Built between 1972 and 1975, the complex consists of two main buildings, with the main one standing at 102 m (335 ft) tall with 32 floors which is the tallest habitable building in Mannheim.

== History ==
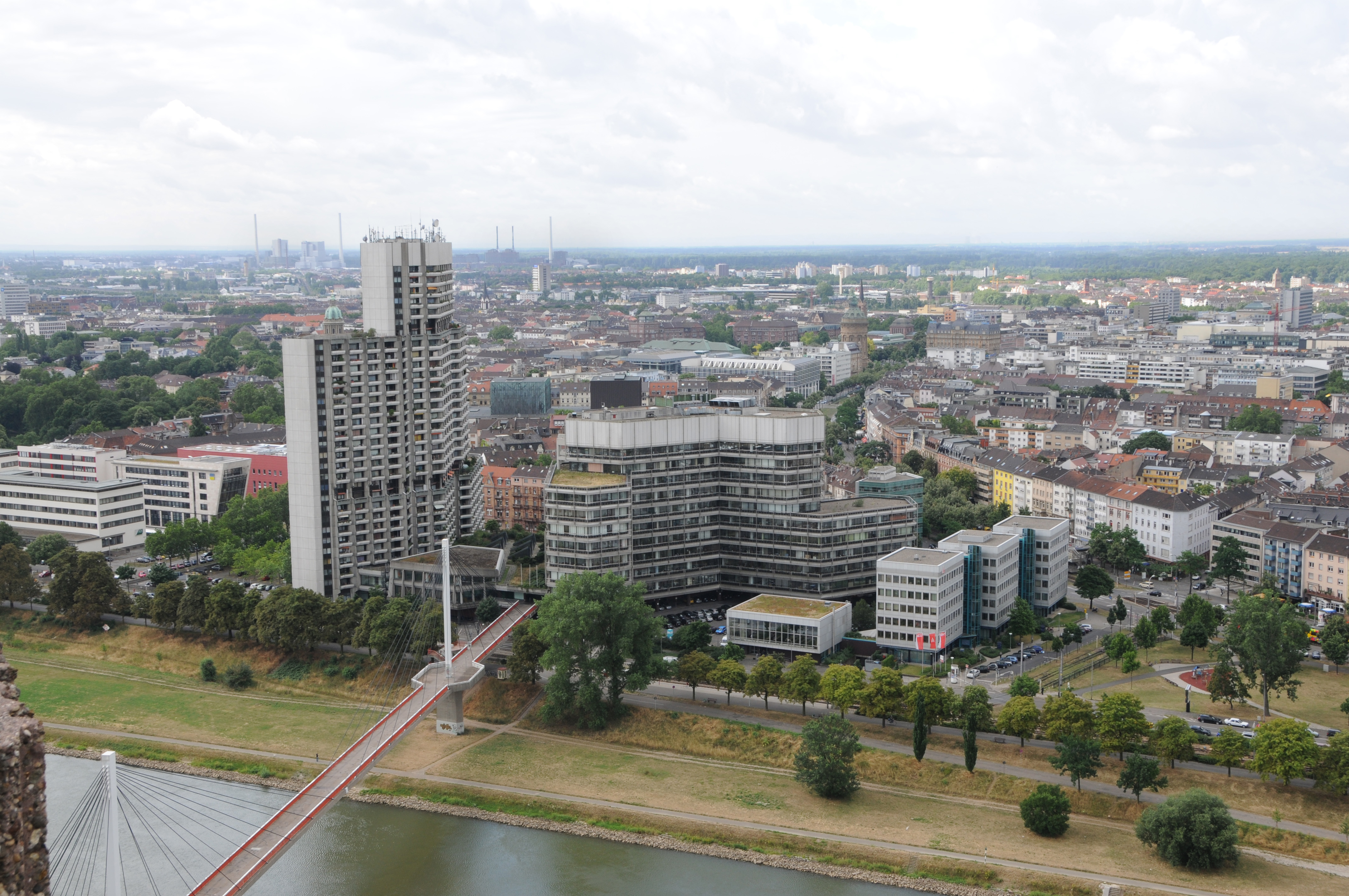
Aerial view of the building complex

The smaller office tower was built by Neue Heimat and rented by the city of Mannheim to house the technical offices. In 1984, the city bought the office tower and the connecting wing with swimming pool and shop gallery for 32 million D-Marks. The swimming pool has been empty since 1990. In contrast to the renovated residential tower, which is privately owned by a community of owners, the office tower is in need of renovation. The costs were estimated at over 70 million euros in 2013. The tower was therefore to be demolished. The city sold it in 2020 to Deutsche Wohnwerte GmbH & Co. KG from Heidelberg. At the end of 2021, the city handed the building over to the buyer after the municipal offices located there had moved to the new Technical Town Hall near the main train station in the Glückstein quarter in the Lindenhof district.

The buyer of the Collini Centers, Deutsche Wohnwerte, applied for demolition. Until February 28, 2023, the owners of the Collini residential tower could send their objections to the demolition application to the Mannheim Building Authority as part of a “neighbor participation in the building permit process.”

Residents, architects and art historians have also increasingly spoken out in favour of preserving and renovating the building, as well as converting it into a residential building. One of the features of the BdA exhibition “Endangered Species – Preservation vs. Demolition” is a design by an architecture student in which she shows, as part of her master’s thesis, what a conversion of the office tower into a residential building could look like. Particularly in view of climate change, the scarcity of resources and rising costs, renovating and converting the building into a residential building would be the right way to go – the State Monuments Office also sees it this way: “We cannot put every building under monument protection. But of course we would like to see architects, investors and developers rethink their approach.” (Martin Hahn, State Monuments Office Stuttgart). The renovation would preserve a piece of Mannheim's urban and architectural history, because the Collini Center was designed by Karl Schmucker, a Mannheim architect, and he was awarded the 12th Mannheim Stone for his services - also in the Collini Center he designed. "Karl Schmucker created a number of important buildings in our city that have shaped the cityscape," said Cultural Mayor Michael Grötsch, praising the outstanding achievements of the architect Karl Schmucker and also his great construction commitment and his services in documenting the architectural history of Mannheim.

In August 2023, the city of Mannheim approved the demolition of the Collini Center office tower. In 2024, Deutsche Wohnwerte withdrew from the purchase, citing increased construction costs due to the corona pandemic and the Ukraine war, high interest rates for construction financing, but also project-related factors such as the required high number of parking spaces and the integration of rent-reduced housing in accordance with Mannheim's social quota. The building thus reverted to the city of Mannheim.

=== Architecture ===
The complex consists of a higher residential tower and a lower office tower, which can be reached via a two-storey passage. Until the move to the new Technical City Hall, the office wing housed the city's technical offices and other municipal facilities (media education, etc.). The Collini Center is directly connected to the Neckarstadt-Ost district via the Neckarsteg. Opposite are the three striking 100-metre-high high-rise buildings of the Neckaruferbebauung Nord Complex. It was built on the site of the Mannheim tram depot on Collinistrasse, which was closed in 1971, on the occasion of the 1975 Federal Garden Show and the associated urban development concept. Collinistrasse and thus the Collini Center were named after Cosimo Alessandro Collini, who had been court historiographer and head of the natural history cabinet at the Mannheim court from 1760. The residential tower is privately owned.

The three-level tower-shaped structure with honeycomb balcony structure is characteristic. Originally, a 150-meter-high office tower with 50 floors was to be built, surrounded by five-story residential and school buildings. According to the architect's idea, living, working and leisure were to be combined under one roof. After a soil investigation, the height had to be reduced to 95 meters and the use was also replanned. Today, around 1,300 people live in the residential tower. The Collini Center is one of the tallest skyscrapers in Baden-Württemberg.

The Collini Center was included in the list of endangered brutalist representatives of the Wüstenrot Foundation “#SOSBrutalism” and is also part of the Stuttgart exhibition “Endangered Species – Preservation vs. Demolition” of the Association of German Architects (BdA) Baden-Württemberg.

=== Usage ===
- Building 1, residential high-rise:
  - Floors: 32 (including 30 residential floors)
  - Elevators: four passenger elevators, one freight elevator
  - Apartments: 515 one- to four-room apartments and maisonette apartments
- Building 2, two-storey shopping arcade (closed):
  - Mannheim City Media Center (SMZ)
  - Office of the International Film Festival Mannheim-Heidelberg
  - Cinema Quadrat (until November 2019)
  - various shops
  - indoor swimming pool "Kurpfalz-Thermen" (closed)
- Building 3, office tower, City of Mannheim, formerly Technical Town Hall (closed)
  - floors 10
  - elevators 4
  - Before moving to the Ochsenpferchbunker in March 2018, the City Archives – Institute for Urban History, now Marchivum, had its headquarters in the office tower.

== Gallery ==
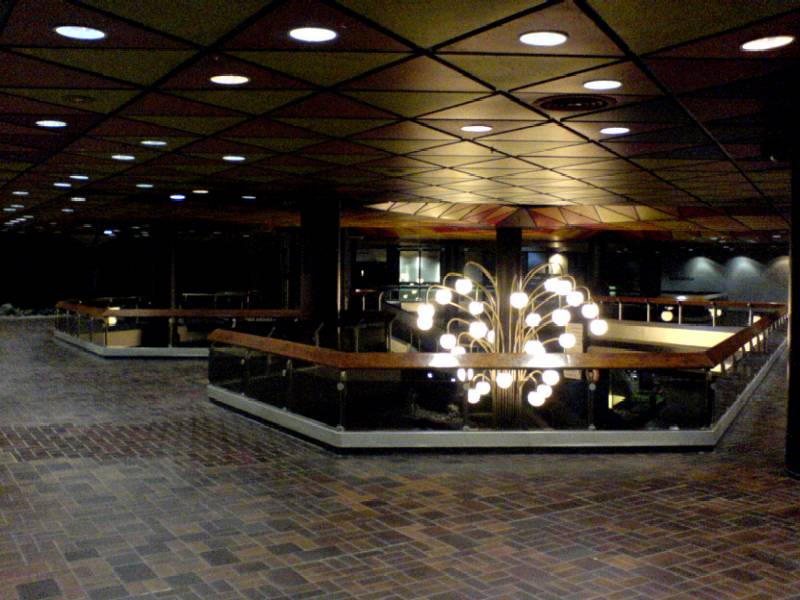
Connecting wing between residential and office tower

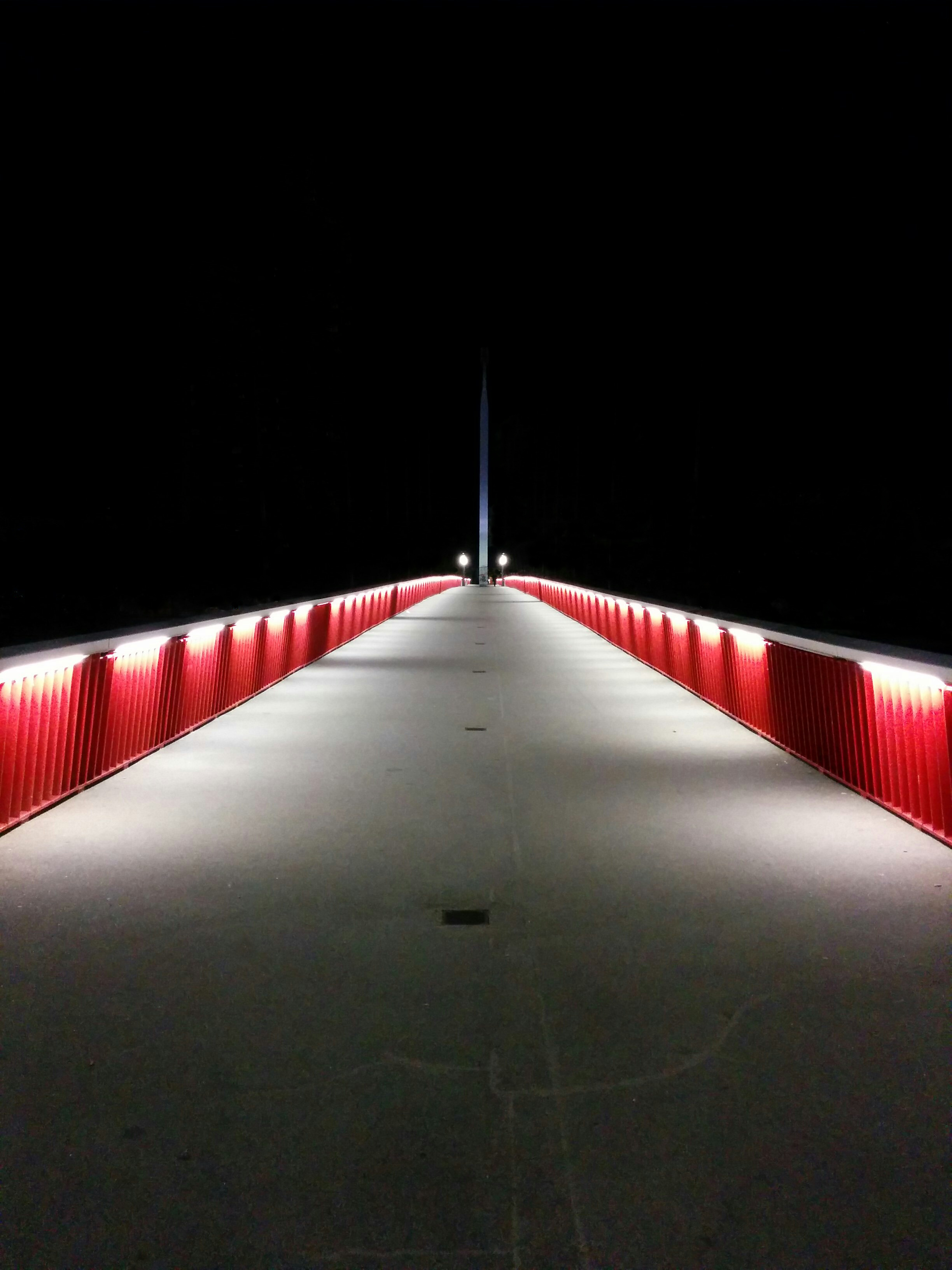
Der Neckarsteg towards Neckarstadt-Ost by night

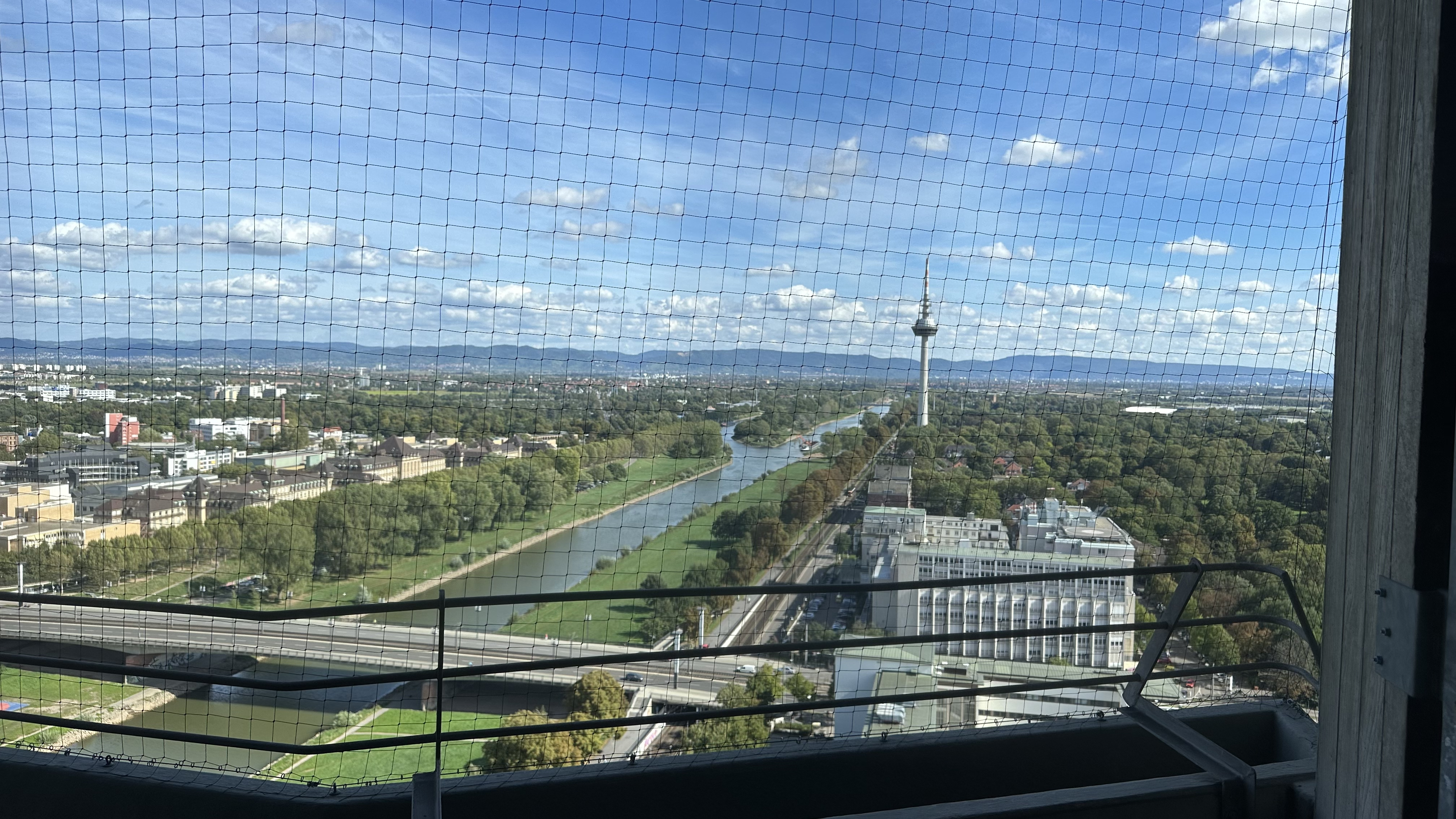
View from the Collini residential tower towards Heidelberg and Odenwald in September 2023

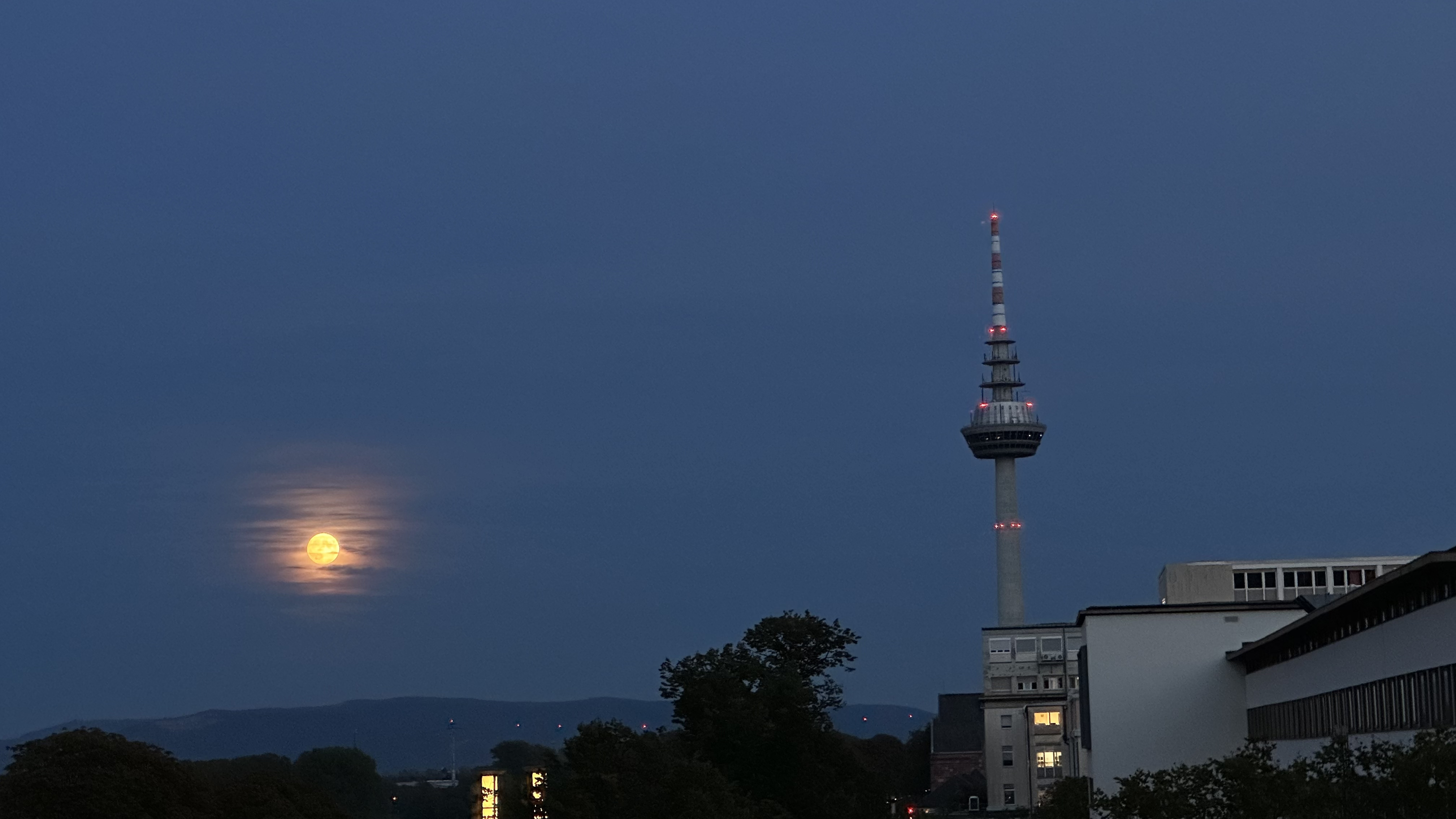
View from the Collini residential tower at night

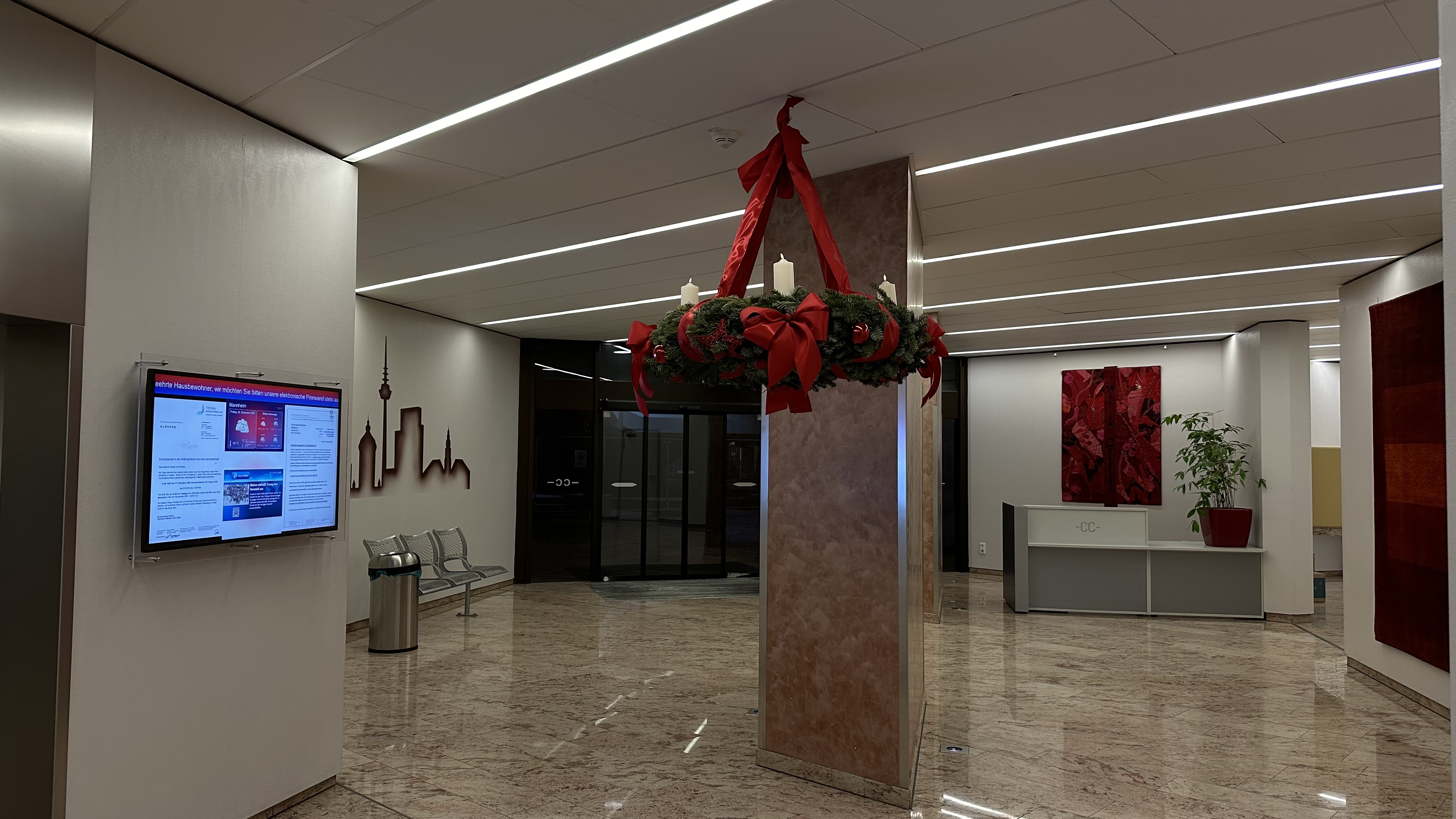
Foyer of the Collini residential tower in December 2023

== See also ==
- List of tallest buildings in Mannheim
- List of tallest buildings in Germany
