= Victoria Turm =

Skyscraper in Mannheim, Germany

Victoria Tower
- Victoria Turm (German)
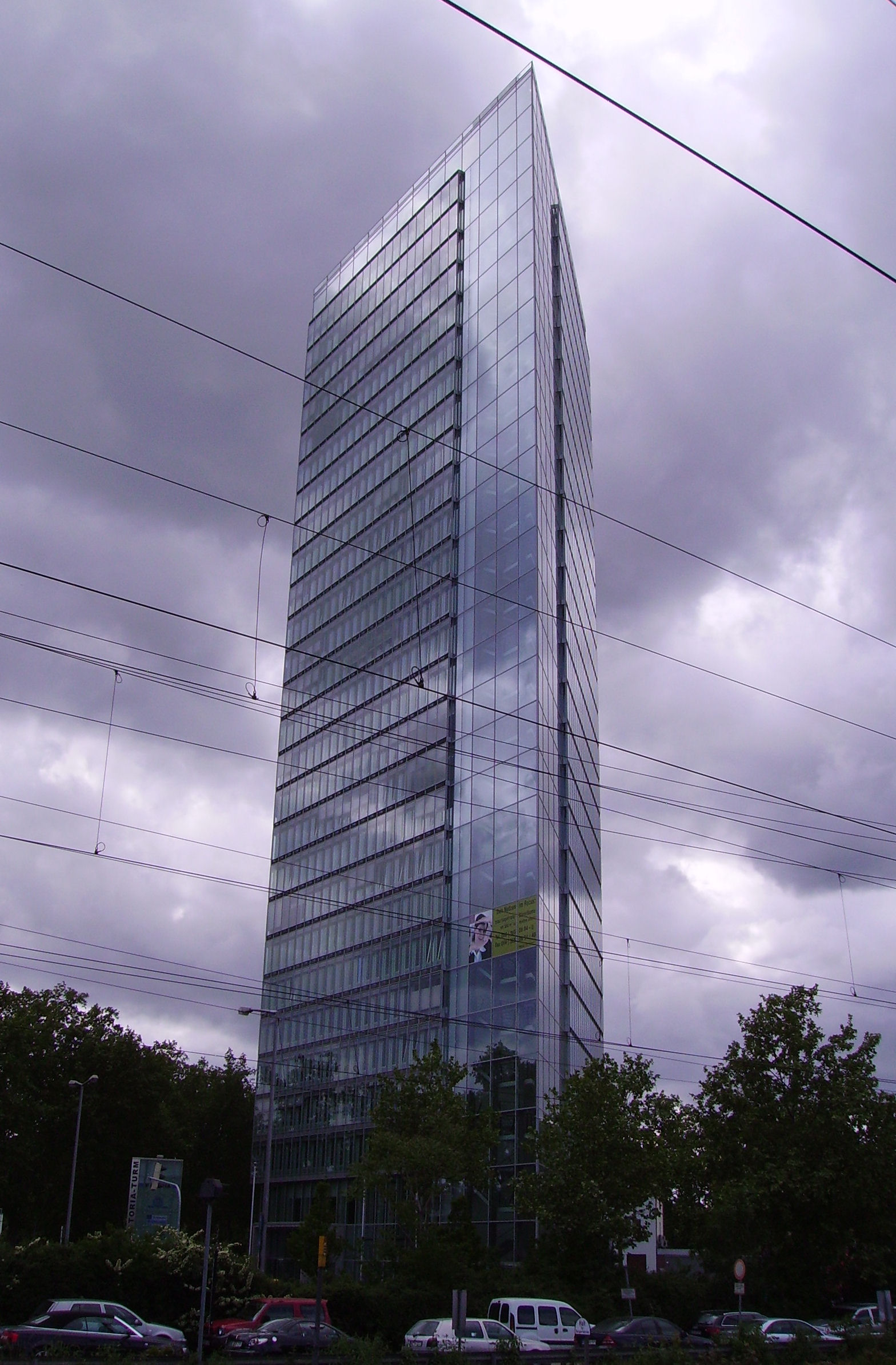
- Interactive map of the Victoria Tower area

General information
- Status: Completed
- Type: Office
- Location: Mannheim, Germany, 2 Am Victoria-Turm, Mannheim, Germany
- Coordinates: 49.47850°N 8.46768°E
- Construction started: 1999
- Completed: 2001
- Cost: € 110,000,000

Height
- Roof: 97 m (318 ft)

Technical details
- Structural system: Concrete
- Floor count: 27
- Floor area: 21,800 m^{2} (235,000 sq ft)
- Lifts/elevators: 6

Design and construction
- Architect: Albert Speer + Partner
- Developer: Gloram Real Estate
- Structural engineer: KHP Konig und Heunisch Planungsgesellschaft

Website
- Victoria Turm

The Victoria Tower (German: Victoria Turm) also known as the ERGO Hochhaus is a high-rise office building in the Lindenhof district of Mannheim, Germany. Built between 1999 and 2001, the tower stands at 97 m (318 ft) with 27 floors and is the current 5th tallest building in Mannheim.

== History ==
=== Architecture ===
The building is located in the proximity of the main train station in the Lindenhof district, adjacent to the Mannheim "Suez Canal". It was designed by the Frankfurt architectural firm Albert Speer & Partner GmbH and opened in May 2001. The core of the building was constructed in 27 weeks. The area per floor is 760 m^{2} (8,180 sq ft).

From the outside, the glass shell and the shape of the Victoria Tower are striking. Its floor plan is in the shape of a diamond. Stairwells are located in the acute angles. With 2 basement levels and 27 floors, it is 97.5 meters high, making it the tallest office building in Mannheim. Originally, a height of 114 meters was planned, but these plans could not be realized due to objections from the Mannheim City Airport. During the planning phase, there were fears that the tower could cut off the Lindenhof from the city center, but this did not prove to be the case.

The Victoria Tower is the headquarters of various companies, including the Southwest Regional Directorate of the Ergo Insurance Group – originally Victoria Versicherung AG, hence the name of the building – and DB Regio AG, Central Region.

The street directly next to the building (previously "Joseph-Keller-Straße") was renamed "Am Victoria-Turm" in November 2001.

=== Panorama ===
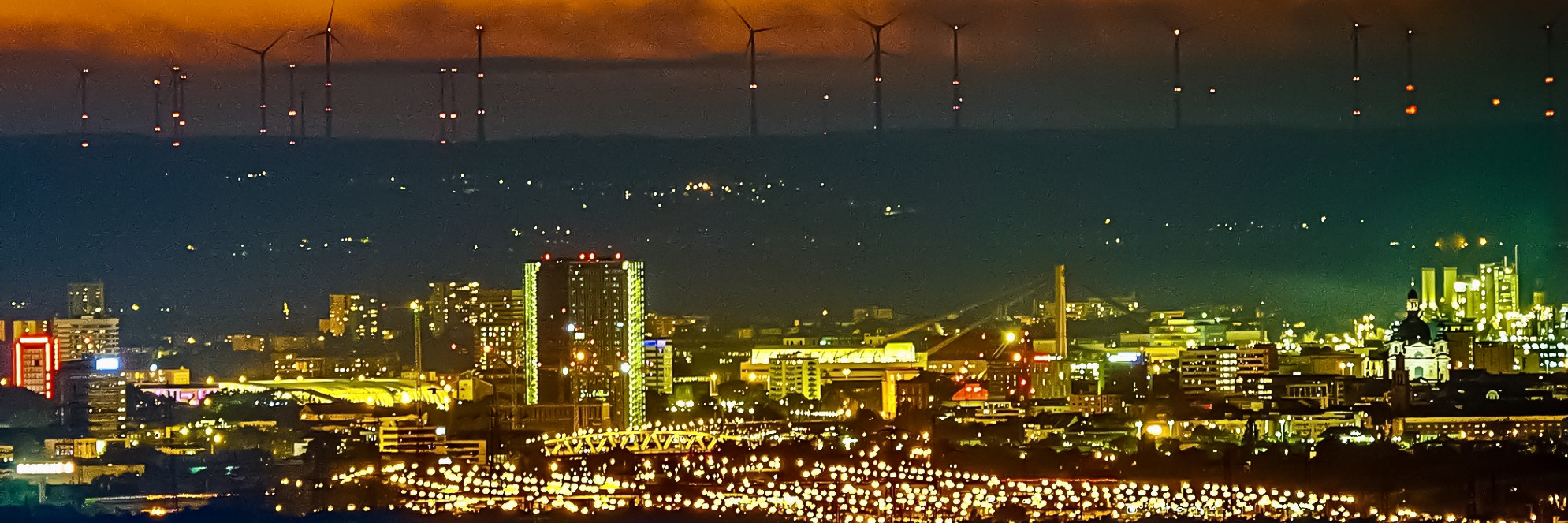
Victoria Tower Mannheim with its illuminated staircases at the acute angles of its diamond shape and its surroundings seen from the east.

== See also ==
- List of tallest buildings in Mannheim
- List of tallest buildings in Germany
