= Alte Feuerwache =

Former fire station and music venue in Mannheim, Germany

Coordinates: 49.49573°N 8.47422°E

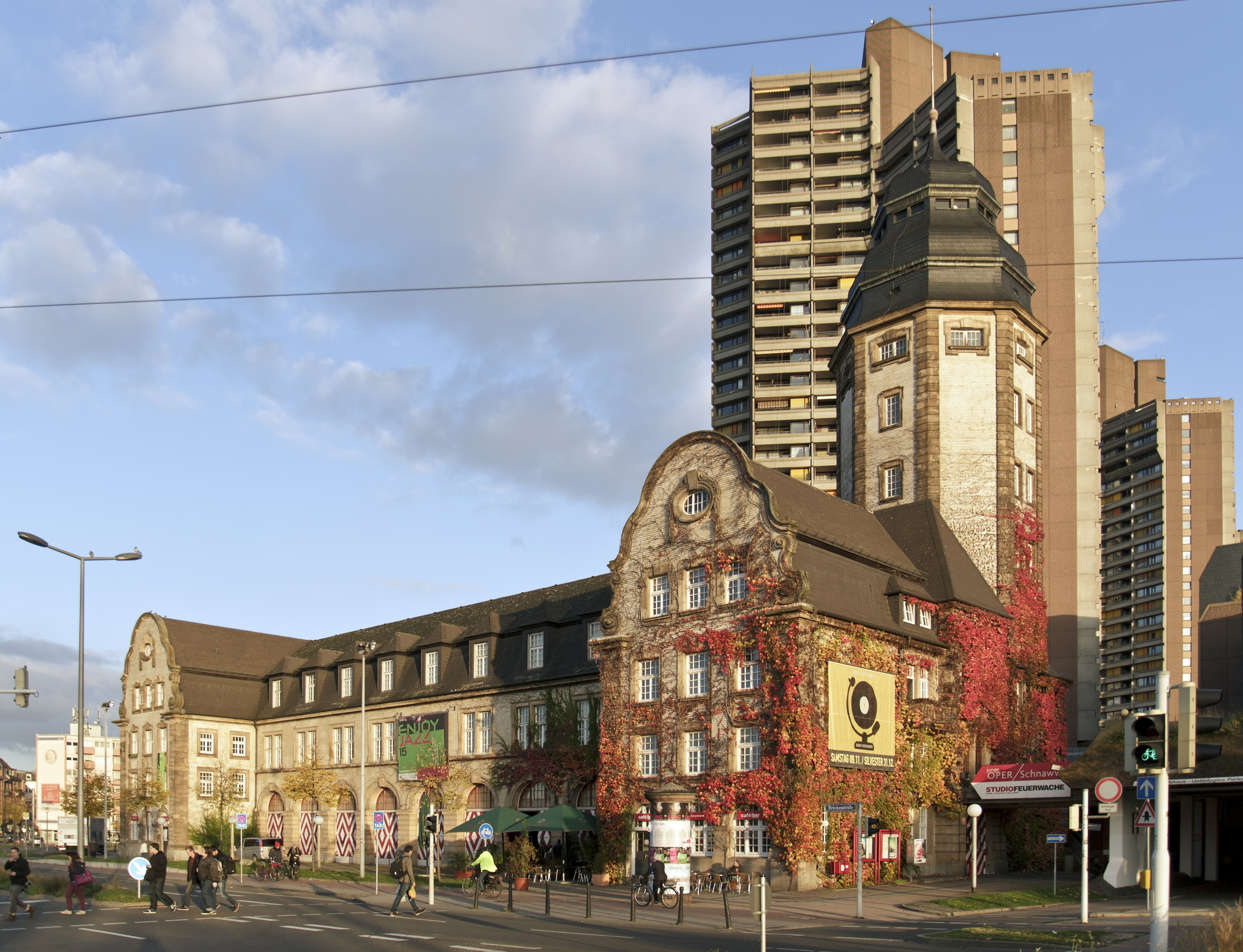
Alte Feuerwache

The Alte Feuerwache is a music venue and former fire station located in Mannheim, Germany. Opened in 1912 as a fire station, it was converted into a music venue in the early 1990s. Alte Feuerwache has hosted artists such as Dio, Motörhead and Arctic Monkeys.
