= Fernmeldeturm Mannheim =

Telecommunication tower in Mannheim, Germany

Coordinates: 49°29′13″N 8°29′32″E

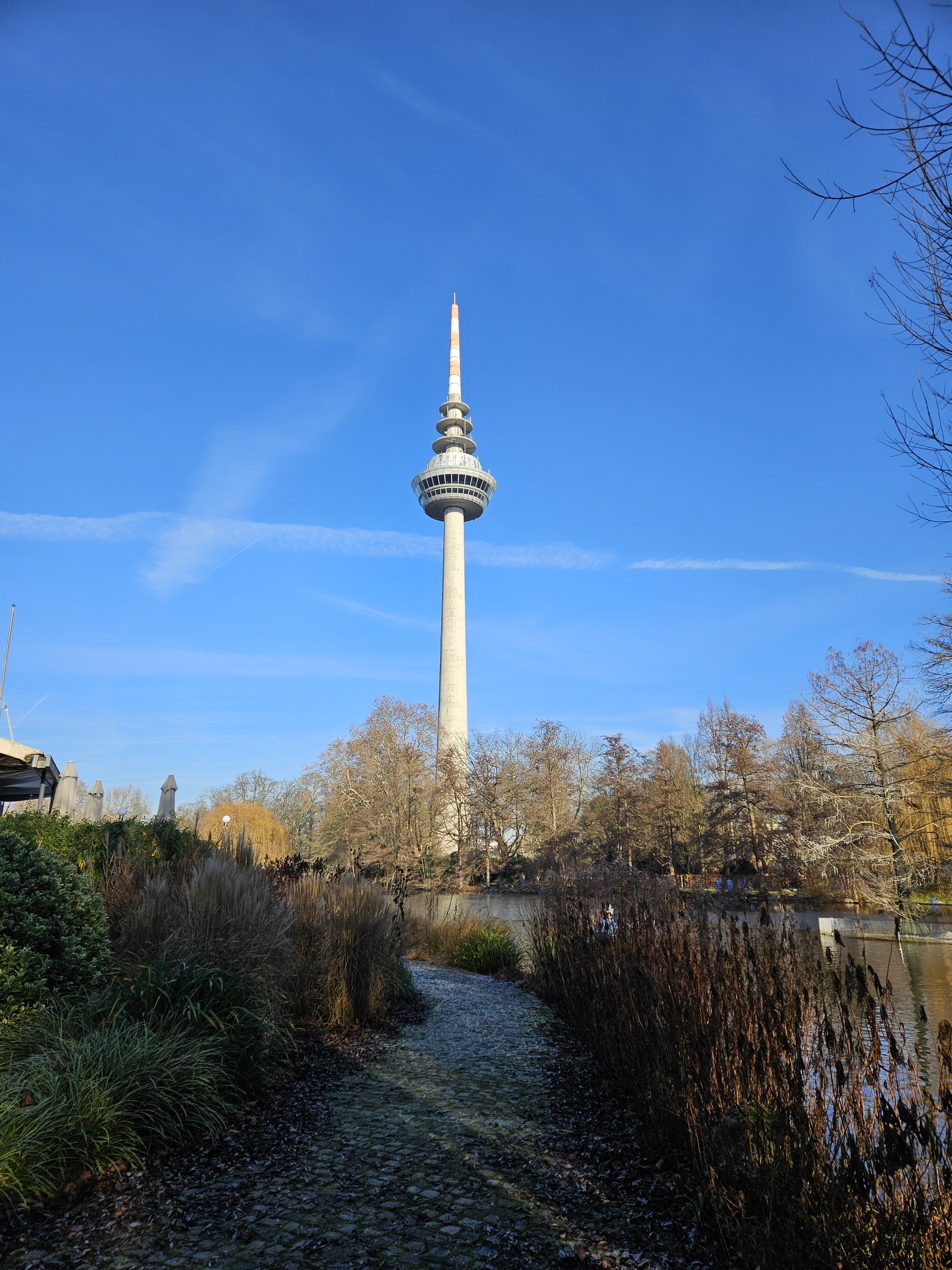
Fernmeldeturm Mannheim

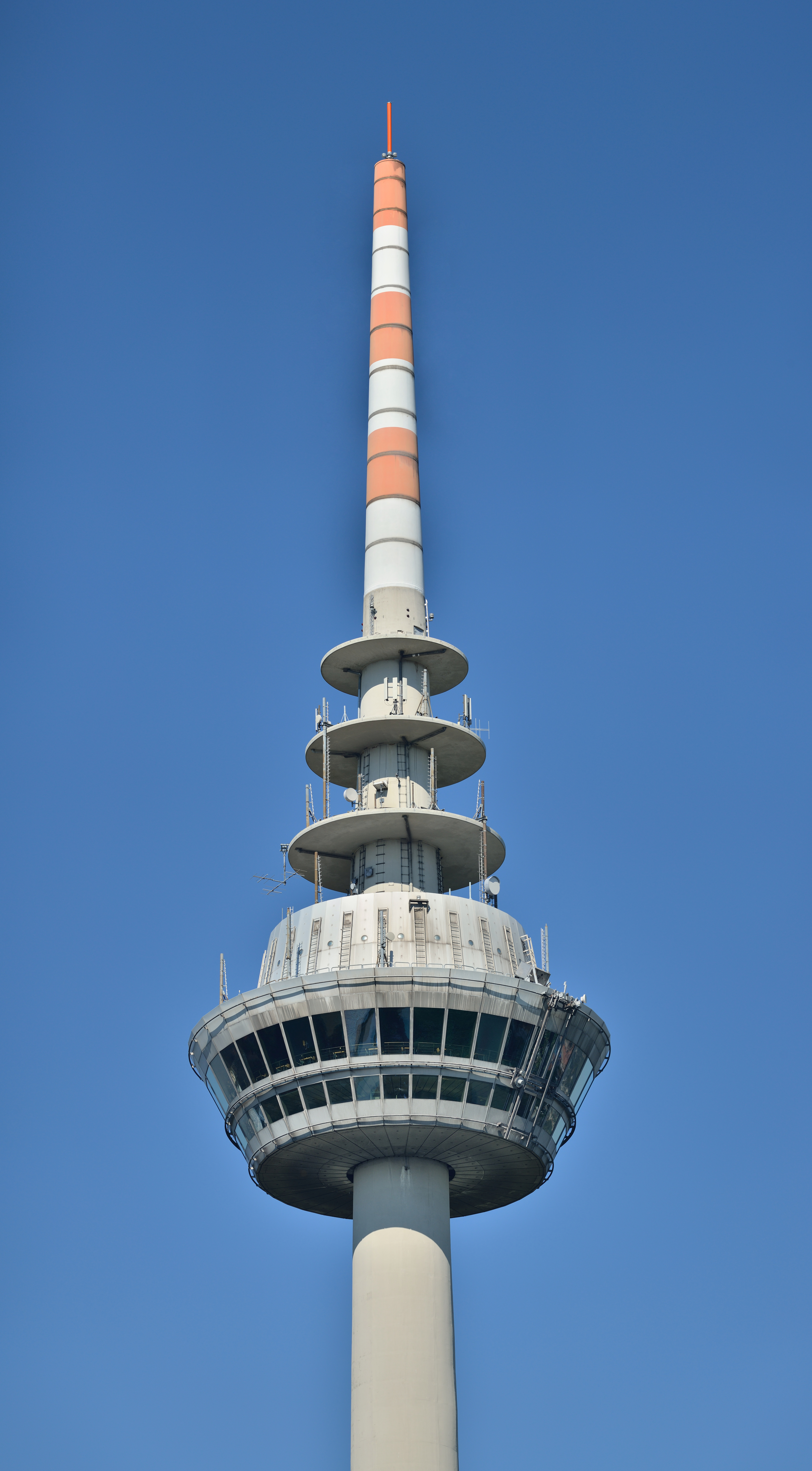
Detail of the Fernmeldeturm Mannheim

The Fernmeldeturm Mannheim is a 217.8-metre-high (715 ft) concrete telecommunication tower with an observation deck in Mannheim, Germany. It was designed by the architects Heinle, Wischer und Partner and built from 1973 to 1975. It contains transmission facilities for VHF radio services, microwave communications, and omnidirectional radio services. A glassed observation deck and a revolving restaurant at a height of 120 metres allow a nice view over Mannheim and the surrounding area. The tower is a modern landmark of the city of Mannheim.

In December 1994 a German SAR Army helicopter returning from a medical patient transfer mission collided with the top of the tower and fell to the ground. The crew of four people died instantly. Parts of the top of the tower were disconnected and also fell to the ground.

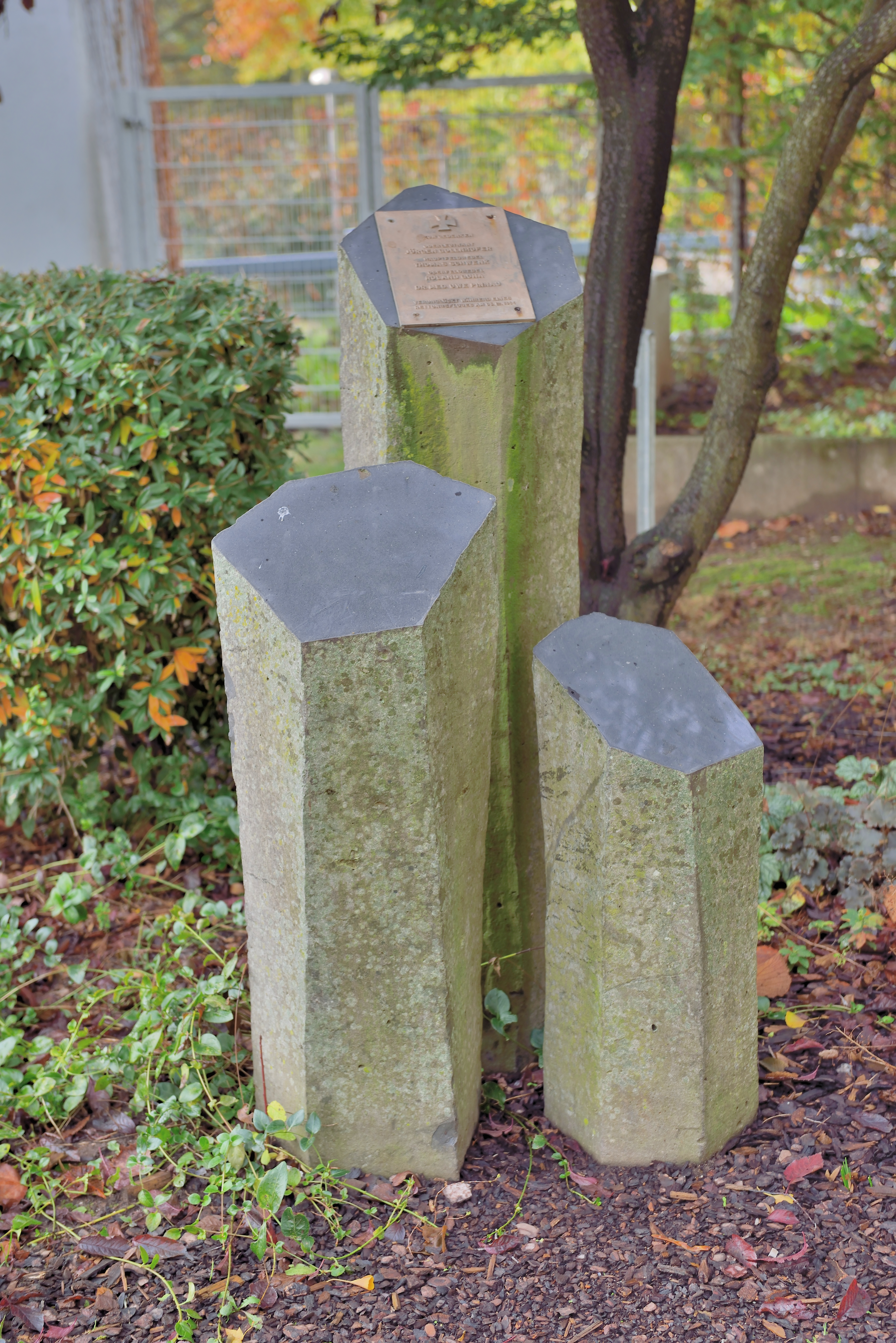
Memorial to the misfortune of 5 November 1994

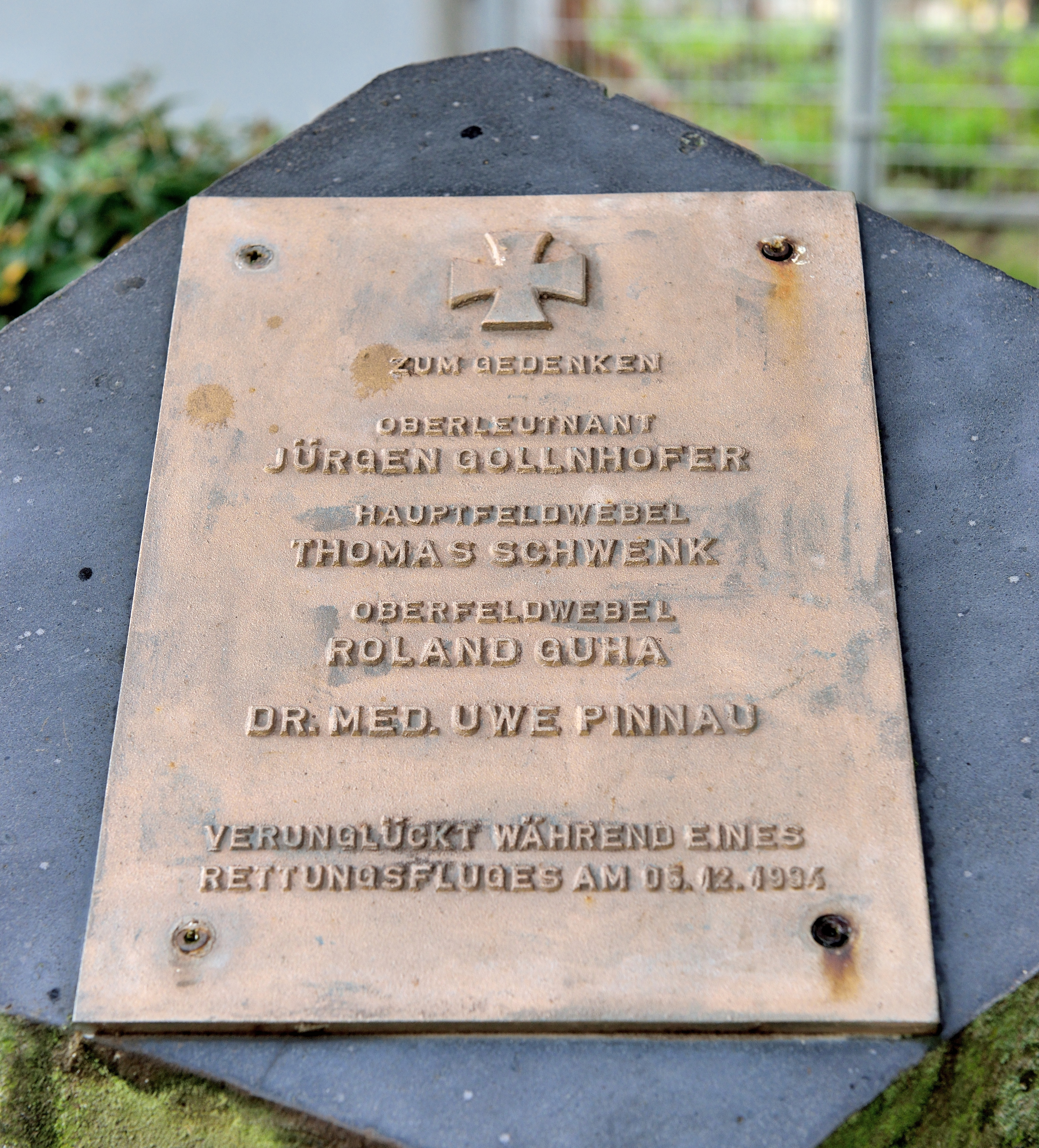
Inscription to the misfortune of 5 November 1994

== See also ==
- List of Towers
