= Sanday (surname) =

Sanday is a surname. Notable people with the surname include:

- John Sanday (born c. 1960), Fijian former rugby union player
- Kirwan Sanday (born 1991), Australian professional rugby union player
- William Sanday (theologian) (1843–1920), British theologian and biblical scholar
- William Sanday (RAF officer) (1883–?), British World War I flying ace

== See also ==
- Sanday (disambiguation)
