= Flodday near Vatersay =

Uninhabited island in Scotland

Flodday
Flodaigh (Gaelic)
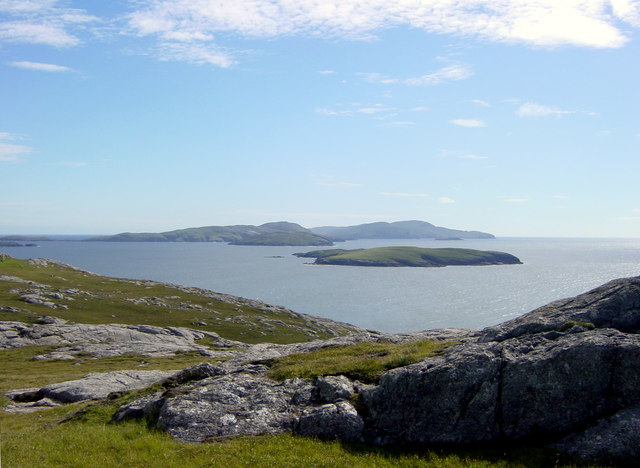
- Flodday (nearest island), viewed from Vatersay

Location
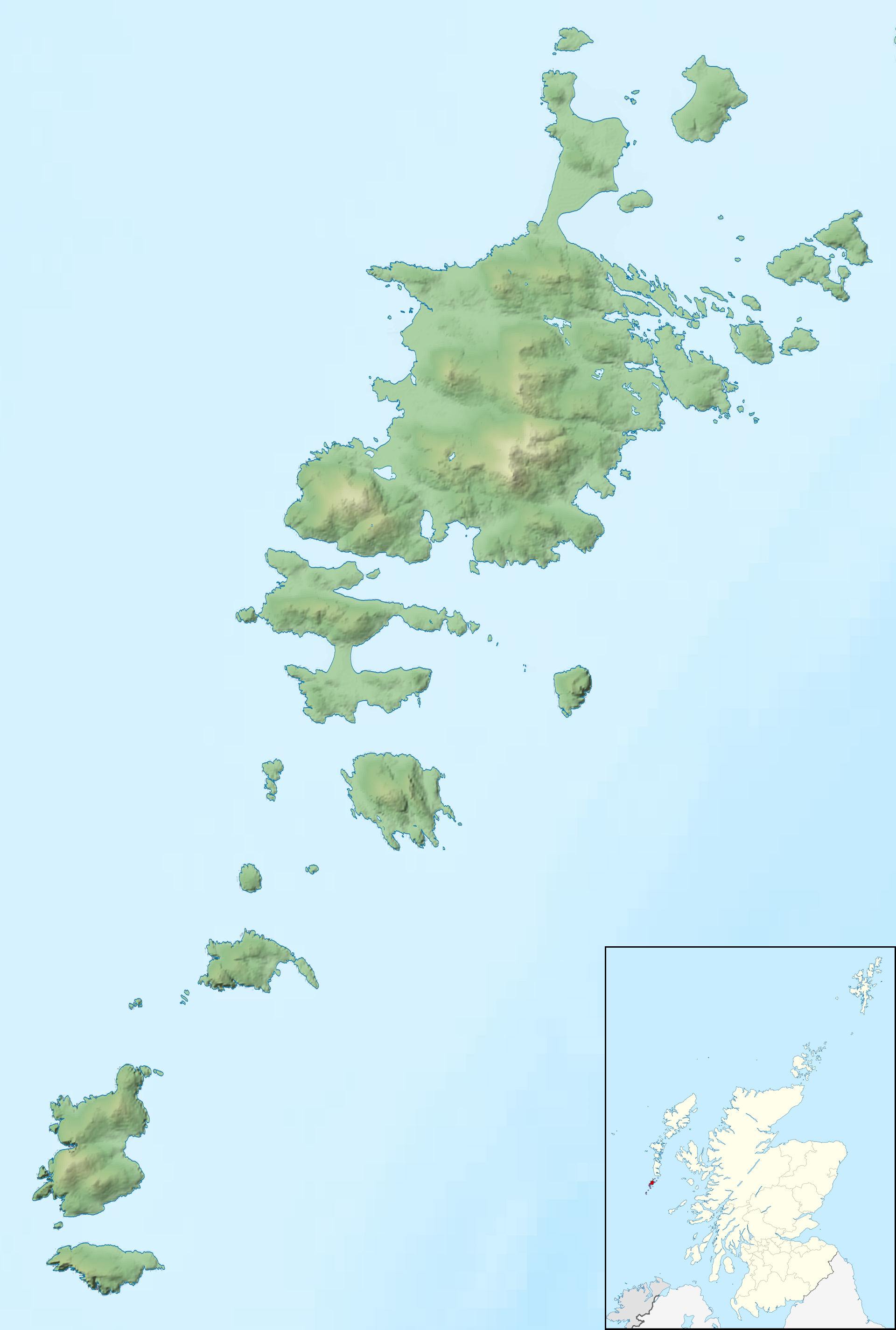
- Flodday shown within the Bishop's Isles Flodday shown within the Outer Hebrides
- OS grid reference: NL612924
- Coordinates: 56.897°N 7.567°W

Name
- Name meaning: 'Raft' or 'float' island
- Old Norse name: Floti

Physical geography
- Island group: Uists and Barra
- Area: 23 ha (57 acres)
- Highest elevation: 43 m (141 ft)

Administration
- Council area: Na h-Eileanan Siar
- Country: Scotland
- Sovereign state: United Kingdom

Demographics
- Population: 0

Flodday (Scottish Gaelic: Flodaigh) is an uninhabited island, south-west of Barra in the Outer Hebrides of Scotland.

The island is one of the Barra Isles, lying one mile (1.5 kilometres) west of Sandray. It consists of three parts, with a natural rock arch between the larger two. Facing west there are black cliffs.

The island has a small grey seal colony and is home to a subspecies of the dark green fritillary butterfly (Argynnis aglaja scotica).
