= Lingeigh =

Unpopulated islet in the Outer Hebrides, Scotland

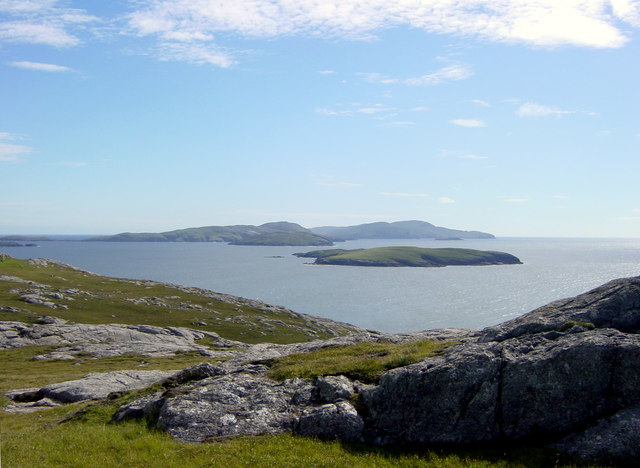
- Lingeigh from Vatersay. It is the small island behind the first small one.

Location
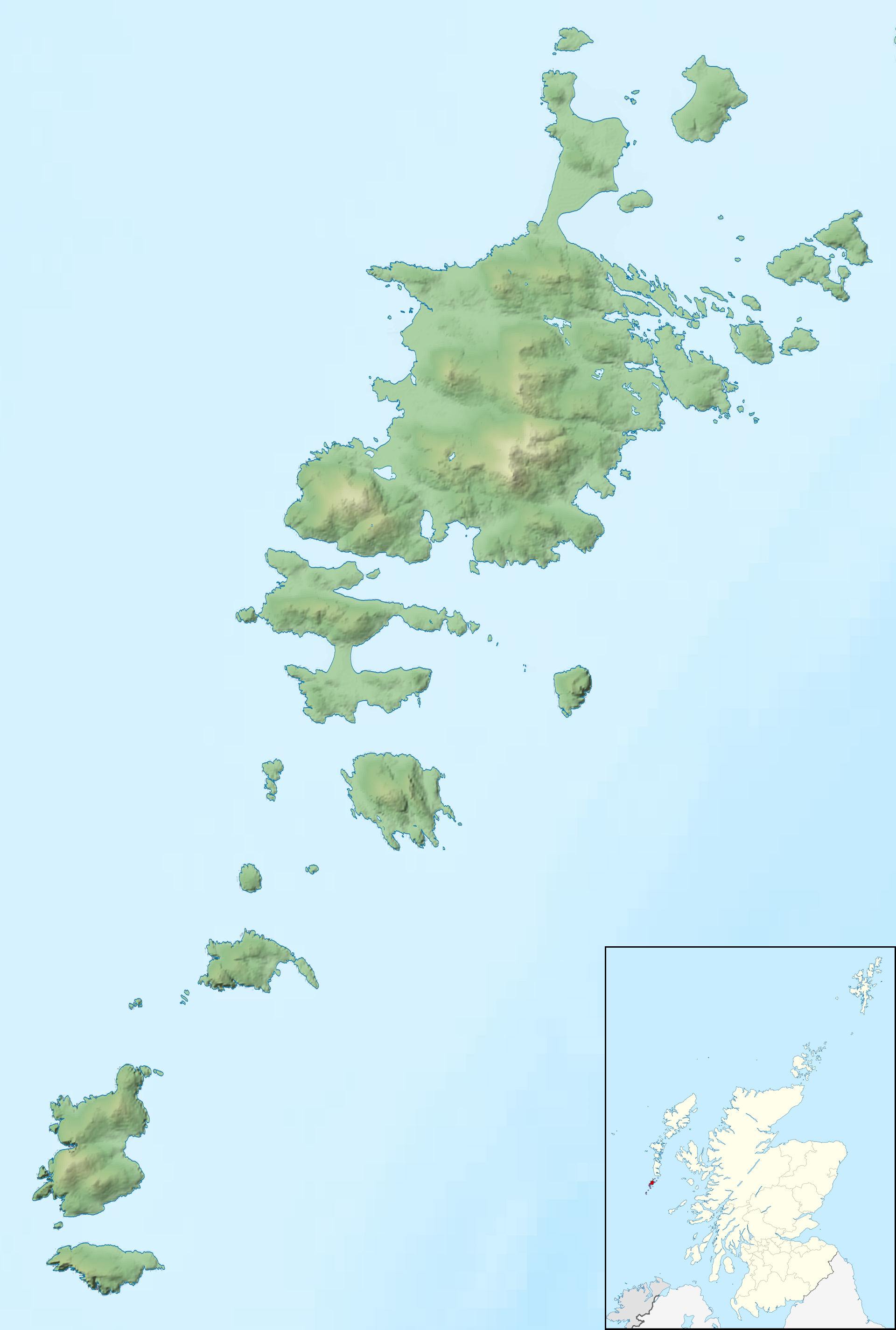
- Lingeigh shown within the Bishop's Isles Lingeigh shown within the Outer Hebrides
- OS grid reference: NL605895
- Coordinates: 56.873°N 7.575°W

Name
- Name meaning: heather island

Physical geography
- Island group: Uists and Barra
- Area: 27 ha (1/8 sq mi)
- Highest elevation: 83 m (272 ft)

Administration
- Council area: Na h-Eileanan Siar
- Country: Scotland
- Sovereign state: United Kingdom

Demographics
- Population: 0

Lingeigh or Lingay is an unpopulated islet in the Outer Hebrides of Scotland. It lies towards the southern end of the archipelago, just north of Pabbay and 5 kilometres (3 miles) south of Vatersay. There is a cave on the southeast side of the island.
