= Sanday =

Sanday may refer to:

- Sanday, Inner Hebrides (Scottish Gaelic: Sandaigh) in the Small Isles
- Sanday, Orkney
  - Sanday Airport
  - Sanday Light Railway
- Sanday (surname)

== See also ==
- Sanda Island (Scottish Gaelic: Sandaigh) off Kintyre
- Sandray (Scottish Gaelic: Sanndraigh) in the Outer Hebrides
- Handa Island (Scottish Gaelic: Eilean Shannda) off Sutherland
- Sandoy, Faroe Islands
- Sandøy Municipality, Norway
