= Muldoanich =

Uninhabited island in Scotland

Maol Dòmhnaich (Gaelic)
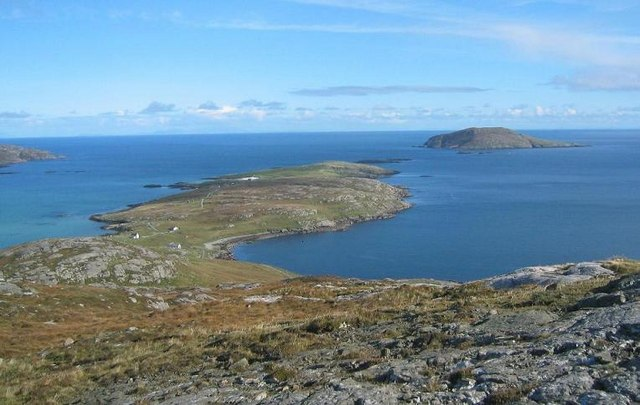
- Muldoanich seen from Vatersay

Location
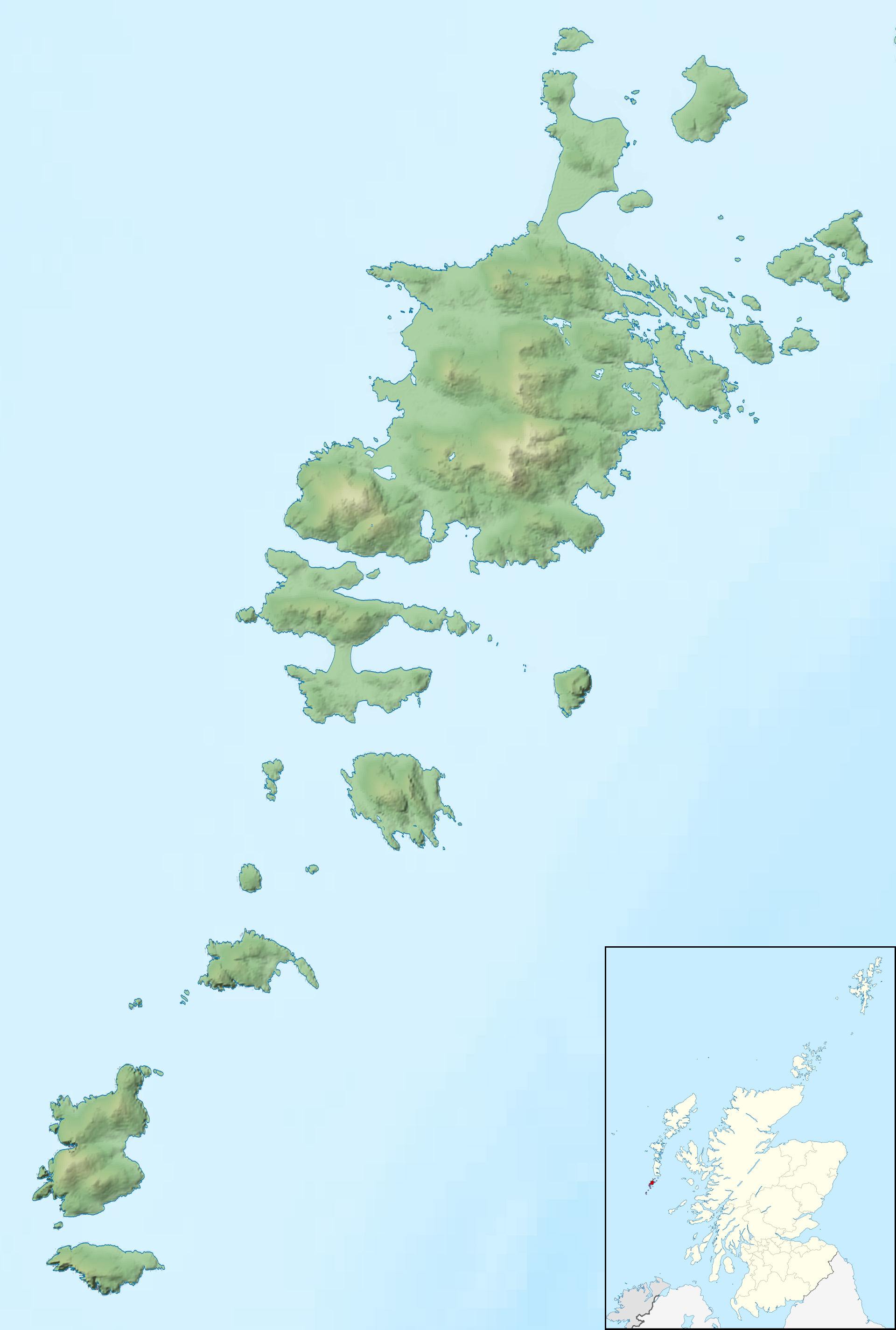
- Muldoanich shown within the Bishop's Isles Muldoanich shown within the Outer Hebrides
- OS grid reference: NL688940
- Coordinates: 56.919°N 7.443°W

Name
- Name meaning: Duncan's rounded hill

Physical geography
- Island group: Uist and Barra
- Area: 78 ha (5/16 sq mi)
- Area rank: 164=
- Highest elevation: Cruachan na h-àin, 153 metres (502 ft)

Administration
- Council area: Comhairle nan Eilean Siar
- Country: Scotland
- Sovereign state: United Kingdom

Demographics
- Population: 0

Muldoanich is an uninhabited island in the Bishop's Isles at the southern extremity of the larger island chain of the Outer Hebrides in Scotland. It is 78 hectares (190 acres) in area and rises to a maximum height of 153 metres (502 ft) at the peak of Cruachan na h-àin ("midday hill").

Muldoanich is about 4 kilometres (2 1/2 mi) southeast of Castlebay, the main port on the island of Barra. It is a prominent landmark for the approaching ferry and other craft and has no level ground. There are no census records, but the southern headland of Vanish (meaning "headland of the house" or "sacred place" in Gaelic) may indicate habitation at some time in the past.

== Etymology ==
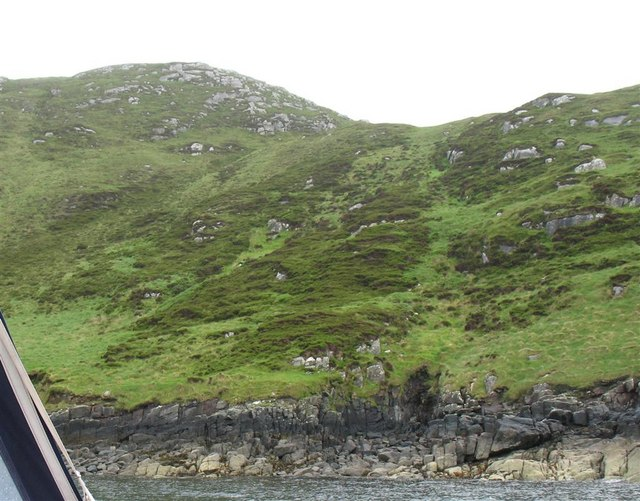
Muldoanich is covered in a luxuriant layer of deep moss.

The name "Muldoanich" is probably the anglicised version of the Scottish Gaelic: Maol Dòmhnaich meaning "Duncan's rounded hill". It is shown with that name on Ordnance Survey maps. Mul Domhnach, meaning "Sunday island", is another possible derivation. Writing in the 16th century, Dean Munro referred to the island as "Scarp" and it appears as "Scarpa" on Blaeu's atlas of 1654.

Martin Martin refers to "Muldonish" in his 1695 voyage around the Western Isles, stating "about a mile in circumference; it is high in the middle, covered over with heath and grass, and is the only forest here for maintaining the deer, being commonly about seventy or eighty in number."
