= Biruaslum =

Coordinates: 56°56′2″N 7°34′36″W

Biruaslum or Bioruaslam is a stack in the Barra Isles of Scotland, to the west of Vatersay. Approximately 2.5 kilometres (1 1/2 miles) from the nearest road, it reaches 72 m (236 ft) in height and there is a ruined prehistoric fort on the southern side. Francis G. Thompson characterizes it as "high and virtually inaccessible"; James Fisher mentions a "fulmar flying up and down its tiny cliff."

== Cliff-fort ==
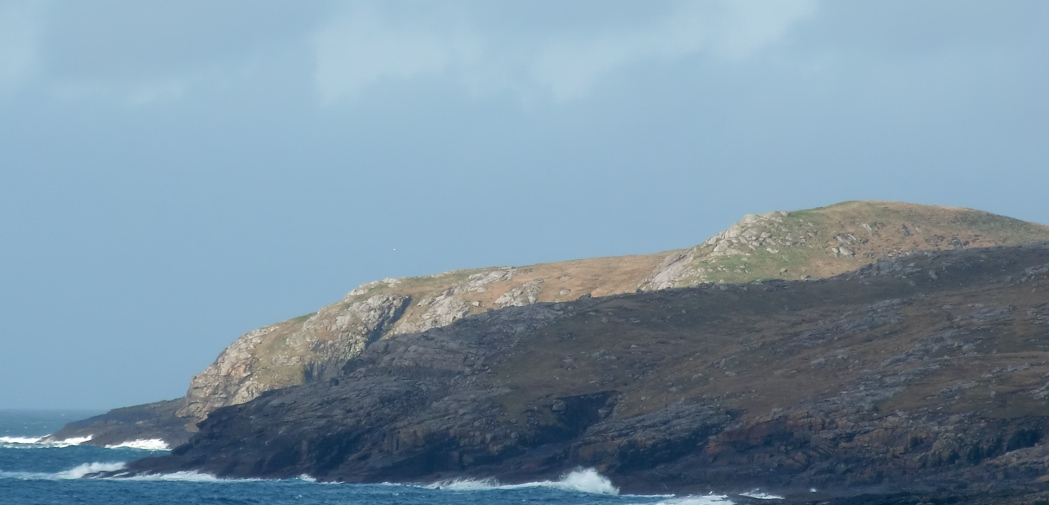
Biruaslum in sunlight, from Vatersay in the foreground

The vertical cliffs on the east side of the islet that separate it from Vatersay protect the site from the sea and a well-constructed wall that is 2 m (6 1/2 ft) wide and 3 m (10 ft) high in places encloses a substantial semi-circular area. The wall is 50 m (160 ft) long and best preserved at the southeastern end. Attached to the uphill side of the wall are the remains of a small oval structure about 19 m^{2} (200 sq ft) in area. The style of the fort is similar to Iron Age structures known from Ireland but the only datable finds so far discovered are of Neolithic pottery.

== See also ==
- Funzie Girt
