= Sandray =

One of the Barra Isles in the Outer Hebrides of Scotland

Sanndraigh (Gaelic)

Location
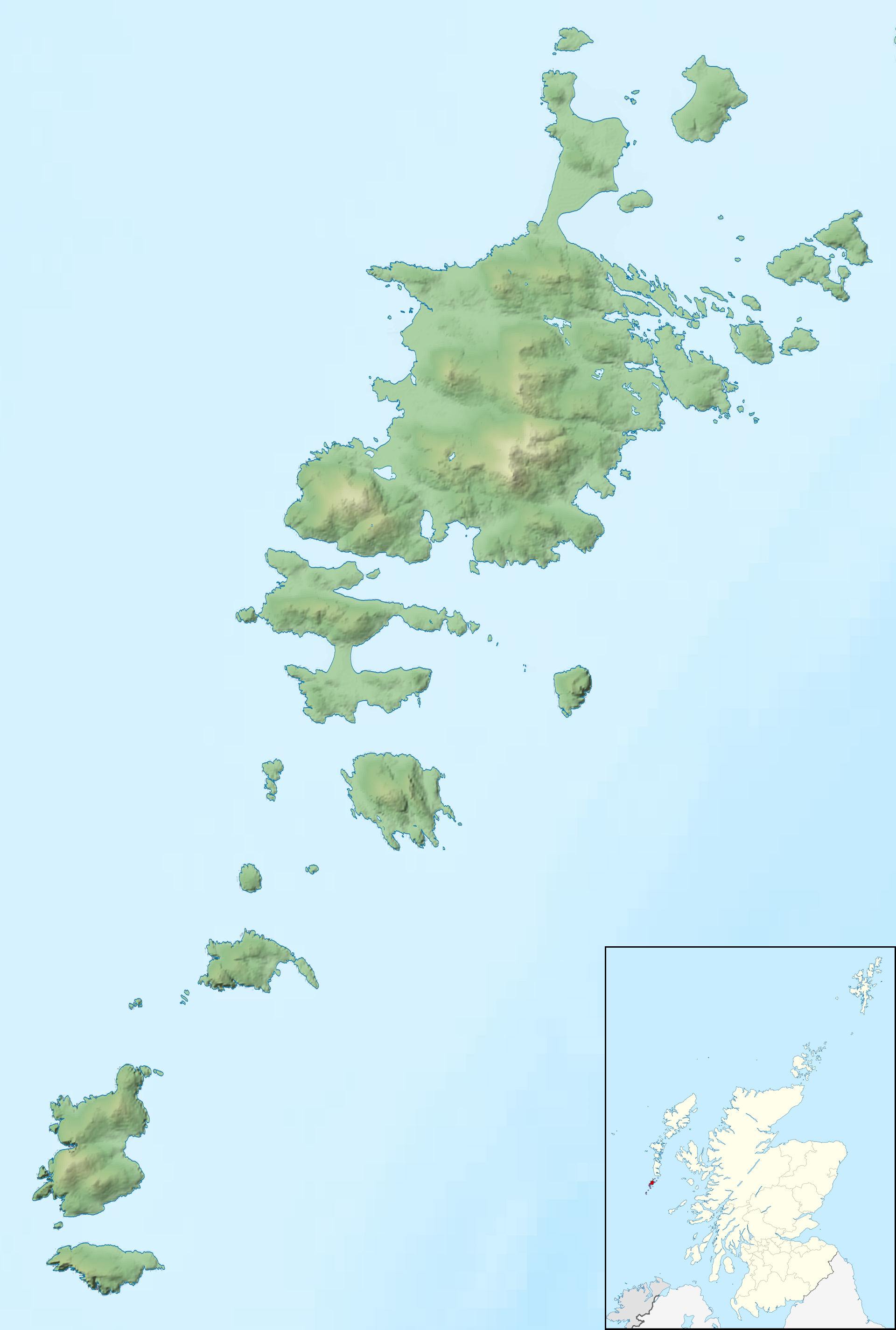
- Sandray shown within the Bishop's Isles Sandray shown within the Outer Hebrides
- OS grid reference: NL651914
- Coordinates: 56.89°N 7.52°W

Name
- Name meaning: Sand island (Norse)

Physical geography
- Island group: Barra
- Area: 385 hectares (1.49 sq mi)
- Area rank: 77
- Highest elevation: Carn Ghaltair 207 metres (679 ft)

Administration
- Council area: Na h-Eileanan Siar
- Country: Scotland
- Sovereign state: United Kingdom

Demographics
- Population: Uninhabited since 1934

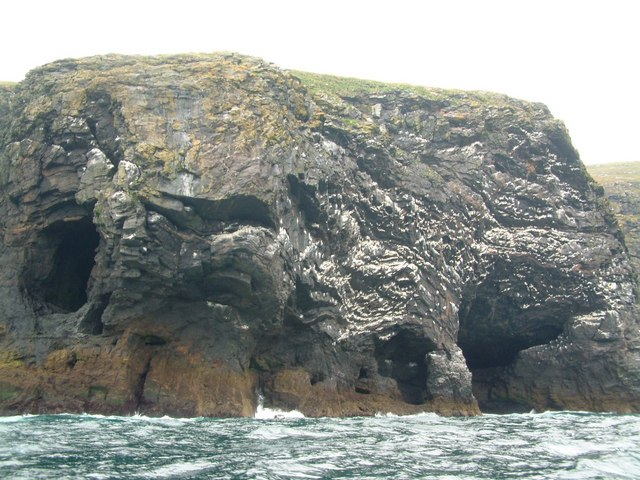
The cliffs of Sandray near the sea

Sandray (Scottish Gaelic: Sanndraigh) is one of the Bishop's Isles in the Outer Hebrides of Scotland. It never had a large population, and has been uninhabited since 1934. It is now known for its large seabird colony.

Sandray is 3 miles (4.8 km) south of Barra and 1/2 mile (0.80 km) south of Vatersay, from which it is separated by the Sound of Sanday Scottish Gaelic: Caolas Shanndraigh. It is 1 mile (1.6 km) east of Flodaigh, 2 1/2 miles (4.0 km) north-east Pabaigh, and the same distance south-west of Muldoanich. There are three main peninsulas on the southern end of Sandray: Meanish (Scottish Gaelic: Meanais, Leehinish (Scottish Gaelic: Lìthinis), and Àird Pabbach.

== See also ==
- List of islands of Scotland
