= Bishop's Isles =

Small archipelago of islands in the Outer Hebrides of Scotland

Coordinates: 56°48′41″N 07°38′15″W

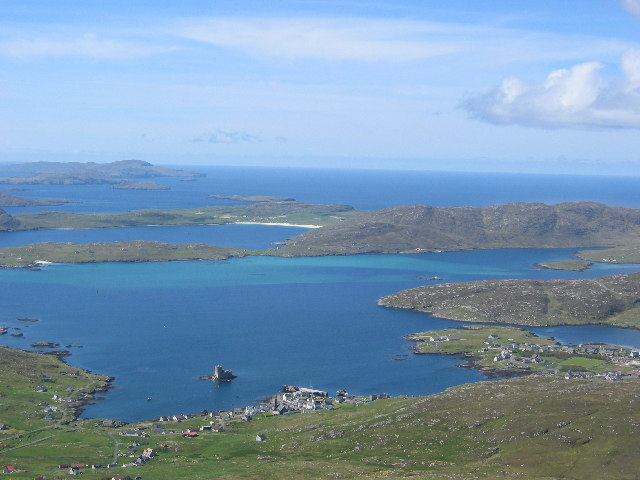
View of the Bishop's Isles from Heaval. Castlebay is in the foreground, with Vatersay, Sandray, Pabbay, Mingulay and Berneray beyond.

The Bishop's Isles, also known as the Barra Isles, are a small archipelago in the Outer Hebrides of Scotland. They lie south of the island of Barra, from which their alternate name originates. The group consists of nine islands and numerous rocky islets, skerries, and sea stacks.

In 1427, the Lords of the Isles awarded the lairdship of Barra (and its associated islands) to Clan MacNeil of Barra. However, after acts of piracy by the MacNeils, King James VI transferred ownership of the southern archipelago to the Bishop of the Isles, (Note: The Bishopric originated with the Kingdom of the Isles.) hence the islands became known as the Bishop's Isles. Murray writes that they belonged "to the Bishop of the Isles de jure although to MacNeil de facto".

Many of the islands are extremely small; only the largest, Vatersay – which is now linked by the Vatersay Causeway to Barra – remains inhabited. Berneray (also known as Barra Head), Pabbay, Sandray and Mingulay have been inhabited in the past. The four smallest named islands are Flodday, Lingay, Muldoanich and Uineasan. (Note: Uineasan is too small to merit its own article, but it is a tiny tidal island connected to the NE extremity of Vatersay.)

The Bishop's Isles are featured in several Viking sagas.

In addition to the larger islands there are various smaller islets, stacks and skerries. Biruaslum is a stack to the west of Vatersay. It reaches 72 metres (236 ft) in height and there is a ruined prehistoric fort on the southern side. Francis G. Thompson describes it as "high and virtually inaccessible"; James Fisher mentions a "fulmar flying up and down its tiny cliff."

List of the Bishop's Isles (roughly north to south)
Name	Alternative name	Area (ha)	Position in relation to Vatersay
Vatersay	Bhatarsaigh	960	—
Muldoanich	Maol Dòmhnaich	78	5 km E
Uineasan	—	~5	0 km E
Flodday	Flodaigh	23	4 km SW
Sandray	Sanndraigh	385	4 km S
Lingay	Lingeigh	27	8 km SW
Pabbay	Pabaigh	250	10 km SSW
Mingulay	Miùghlaigh	640	14 km SSW
Berneray	Beàrnaraigh	204	16 km SSW
