= Kirwan Sanday =

- Born: 13 February 1991 (age 35)
- Height: 186 cm (6 ft 1 in)
- Weight: 118 kg (18 st 8 lb; 260 lb)
- School: St Joseph's College, Nudgee
- Notable relative: John Sanday (uncle)

Rugby union career
- Position: Prop
- Current team: Queensland Country
Senior career
Years	Team	Apps	(Points)
2014, 2016–pres.	Queensland Country	6	(0)
2015	Sydney Stars	3	(0)
- Correct as of 9 October 2016
Super Rugby
Years	Team	Apps	(Points)
2017–pres.	Reds	9	(0)
- Correct as of 2 June 2017
International career
Years	Team	Apps	(Points)
2009–2010	Fiji U20	5	(8)
2015	Fiji Warriors	1	(0)
- Correct as of 27 May 2015

Kirwan Sanday is an Australian professional rugby union player of Fijian descent. He is associated with the Queensland Reds. Sanday's primary position on the field is prop. Throughout his career he played 118 caps for Queensland Reds.

== Early life ==
He is the nephew of John Sanday, the former international rugby player for Fiji. Sanday attended St Joseph's College, Nudgee in Brisbane and was selected for the Queensland team at the Australian Schools Rugby Championships.

== Rugby career ==
Sanday joined the Easts Tigers to play in the Queensland Premier Rugby competition. He played for Fiji Under-20 in 2009 and 2010 at the World Championships. Sanday was selected for the Fiji Warriors against Argentina XV in Uruguay in 2015 and for Queensland Country in the National Rugby Championship.

He made his Super Rugby debut on 27 March 2017 and played off the bench in nine matches of the 2017 season.
