= John Sanday =

Fijian rugby union player

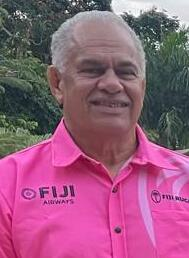
- Born: circa 1960 Sawakasa, Tailevu, Fiji
- Height: 6 ft 10 in (2.08 m)
- Weight: 187 lb (85 kg)
- Notable relative: Kirwan Sanday (nephew)
- Occupation(s): Executive Chairman of Melanesian Trustee Services Ltd. and Pacific Balanced Fund, Chairman and chief exectuve of Viti Mining Ltd.

Rugby union career
- Position(s): Lock, Number eight
Senior career
Years	Team	Apps	(Points)
1989-1999	Suva		
International career
Years	Team	Apps	(Points)
1987	Fiji	2	(0)

John Sanday (born c.1960 in Tailevu) is a Fijian former rugby union player who played as a lock and number eight and is the current Chairman of the Fiji Rugby Union

== Rugby union ==
In his club career he played for Suva in the national championship. His only international caps were in the 1987 Rugby World Cup, where he played two matches against Argentina and New Zealand.

== Business career ==
He is director of Melanesian Trustee Services Ltd., where he is a merchant banker. He has had several ventures in Papua New Guinea, Australia and Fiji and runs a business consultancy company, providing consultancy in the resources sector mainly in fisheries, mining and oil and gas fields with landowner groups.

== Personal life ==
He is married with four children.

He is uncle of Kirwan Sanday, an Australian-born rugby player who plays as prop for Australia and formerly for Fiji U20.
