= Pabbay, Barra Isles =

Island in Barra Isles, Scotland, United Kingdom

Pabbay
Pabaigh (Gaelic)
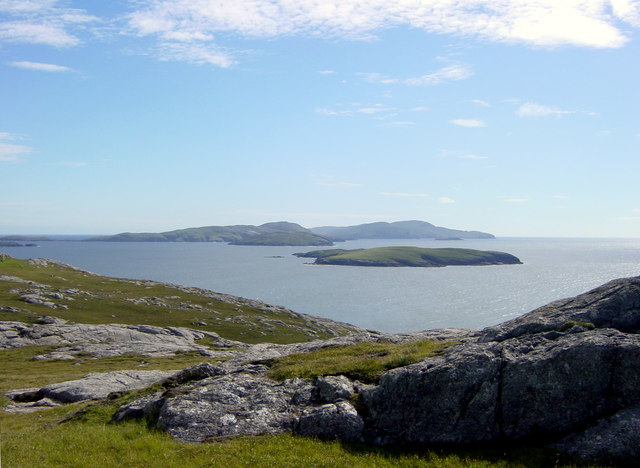
- Pabbay in the distance seen from Vatersay

Location
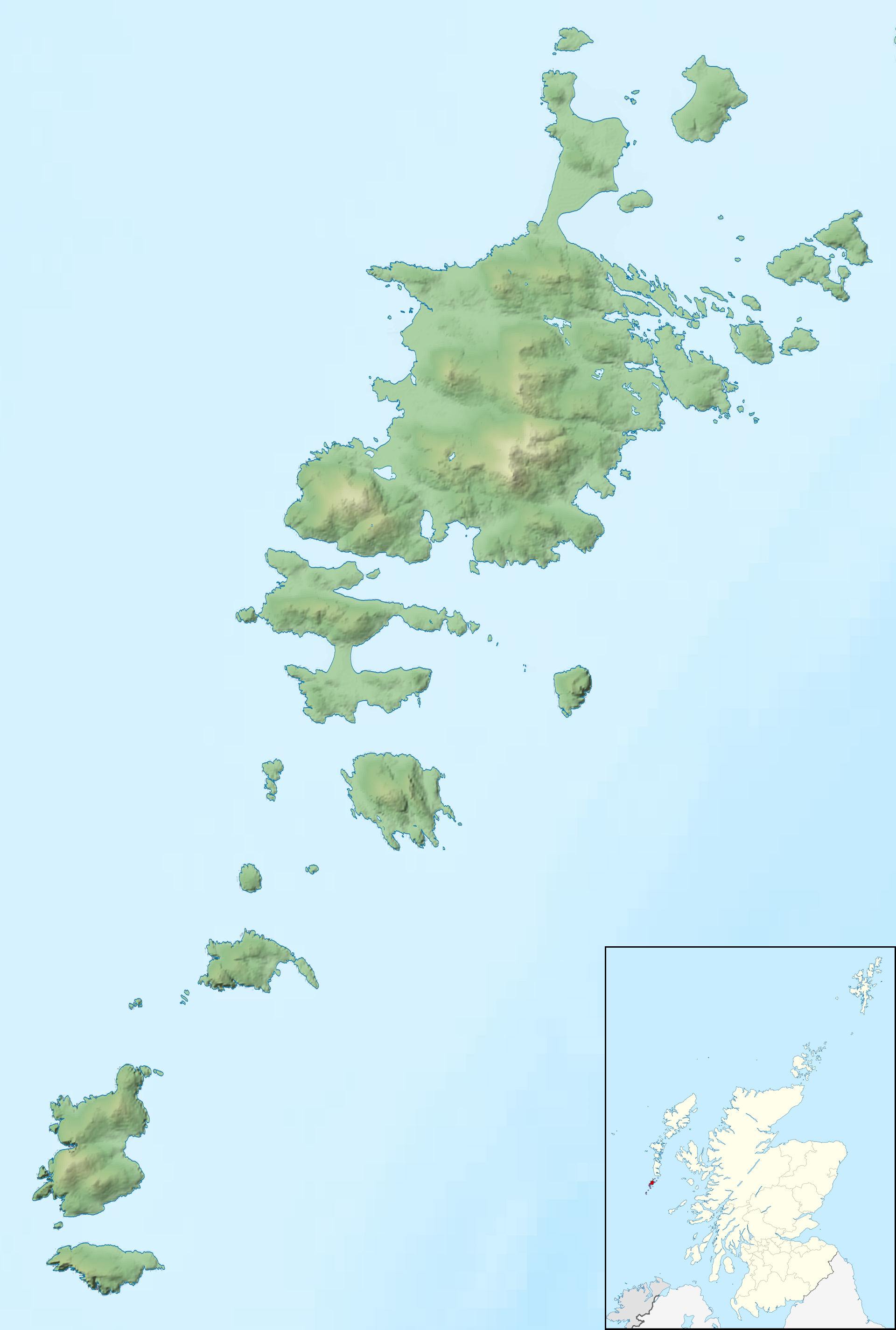
- Pabbay shown within the Bishop's Isles Pabbay shown within the Outer Hebrides
- OS grid reference: NL605880
- Coordinates: 56.85°N 07.57°W

Name
- Gaelic pronunciation: [ˈpʰapaj]
- Name meaning: Island of the papar
- Old Norse name: Papey

Physical geography
- Island group: Outer Hebrides
- Area: 250 ha (620 acres)
- Area rank: 96=
- Highest elevation: 171 m (561 ft)

Administration
- Council area: Outer Hebrides
- Country: Scotland
- Sovereign state: United Kingdom

Demographics
- Population: 0

Pabbay (Scottish Gaelic: Pabaigh) is one of the Bishop's Isles at the southern end of the Outer Hebrides of Scotland. The name comes from Papey, which is Norse for "island of the papar" (i.e. monks). At only 250 hectares (1 sq mi), it never had a large population, and, after all the able-bodied men were killed in a fierce storm while out on a fishing trip on 1 May 1897, it was abandoned in the early twentieth century.

The National Trust for Scotland has owned the island since 2000. With only two sheep left on the island in July 2007 and few, if any, other permanent mammalian residents, Pabbay is consequently home in summer to many ground-nesting birds due to the absence of predators.

The island was the site of a Celtic hermitage, and a Pictish carved stone dates from that period. Remains of an Iron Age settlement can also been seen on Pabbay.

The name of Pabbay is used for one of the three houses of Castlebay Community School. The other two are Mingulay and Sandray.

== Areas of interest ==
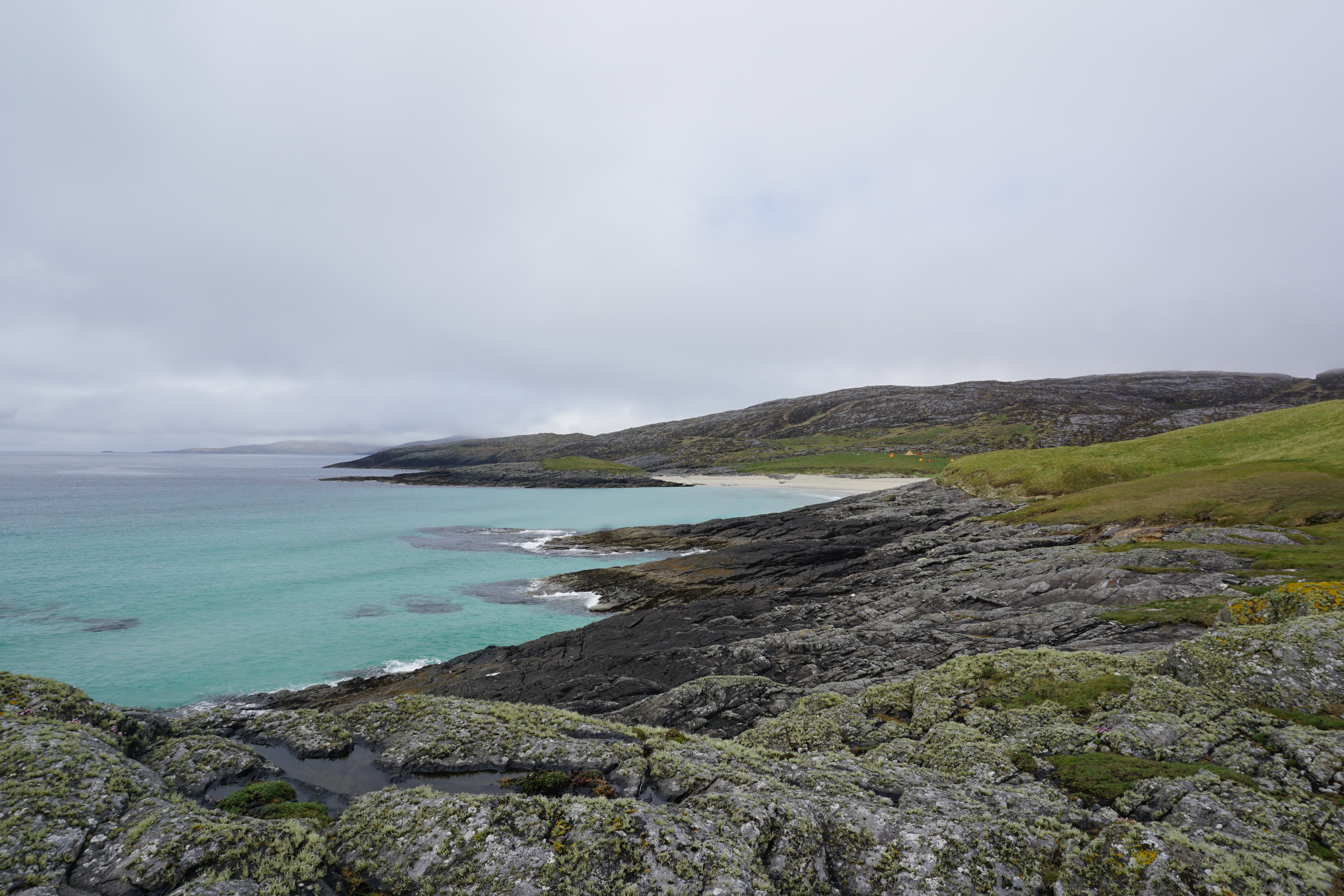
Looking towards Bàgh Bàn from Rosinish

Bàgh Bàn is the name applied to a large bay situated on the SE coast of the island. It is the principal bay on the coast of the island and is well sheltered from the North and West. This made it the ideal area for historical settlers.

Rosinish (or Rubha Phabach) is a small headland situated on the east coast of the island. It lies in a south-easterly direction and is only attached to the mainland of the island by a small natural arch named Steir.

== Rock climbing ==
Composed of Lewisian gneiss, Pabbay is considered "one of the finest climbing venues in the UK". This includes the climbing route The Great Arch, which is graded E8 6c.

== See also ==
- List of islands of Scotland
