= Outer Hebrides =

Archipelago and council area off the west coast of mainland Scotland

Na h-Eileanan Siar (Gaelic)
- Flag of Comhairle nan Eilean Siar Coat of arms

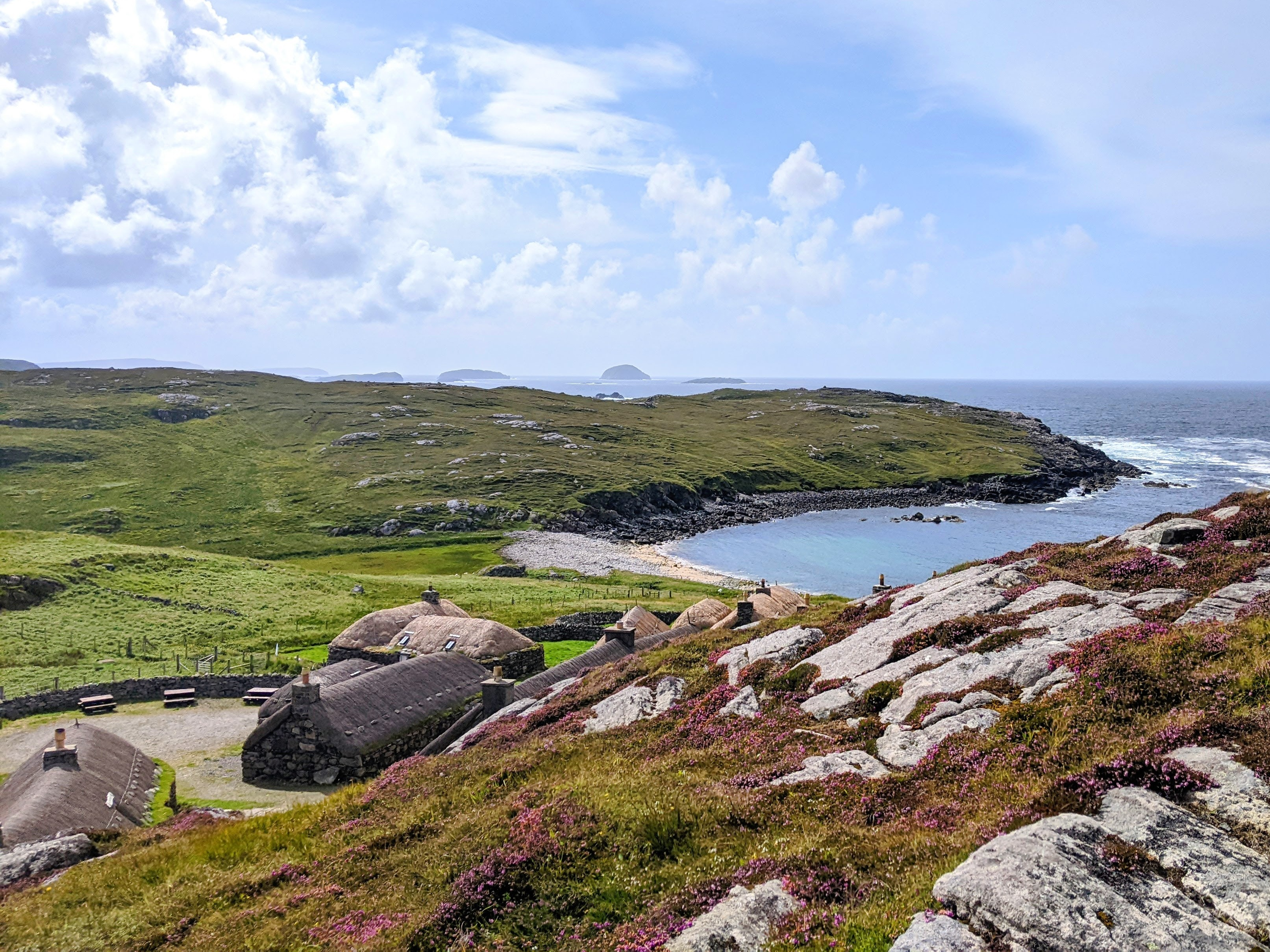
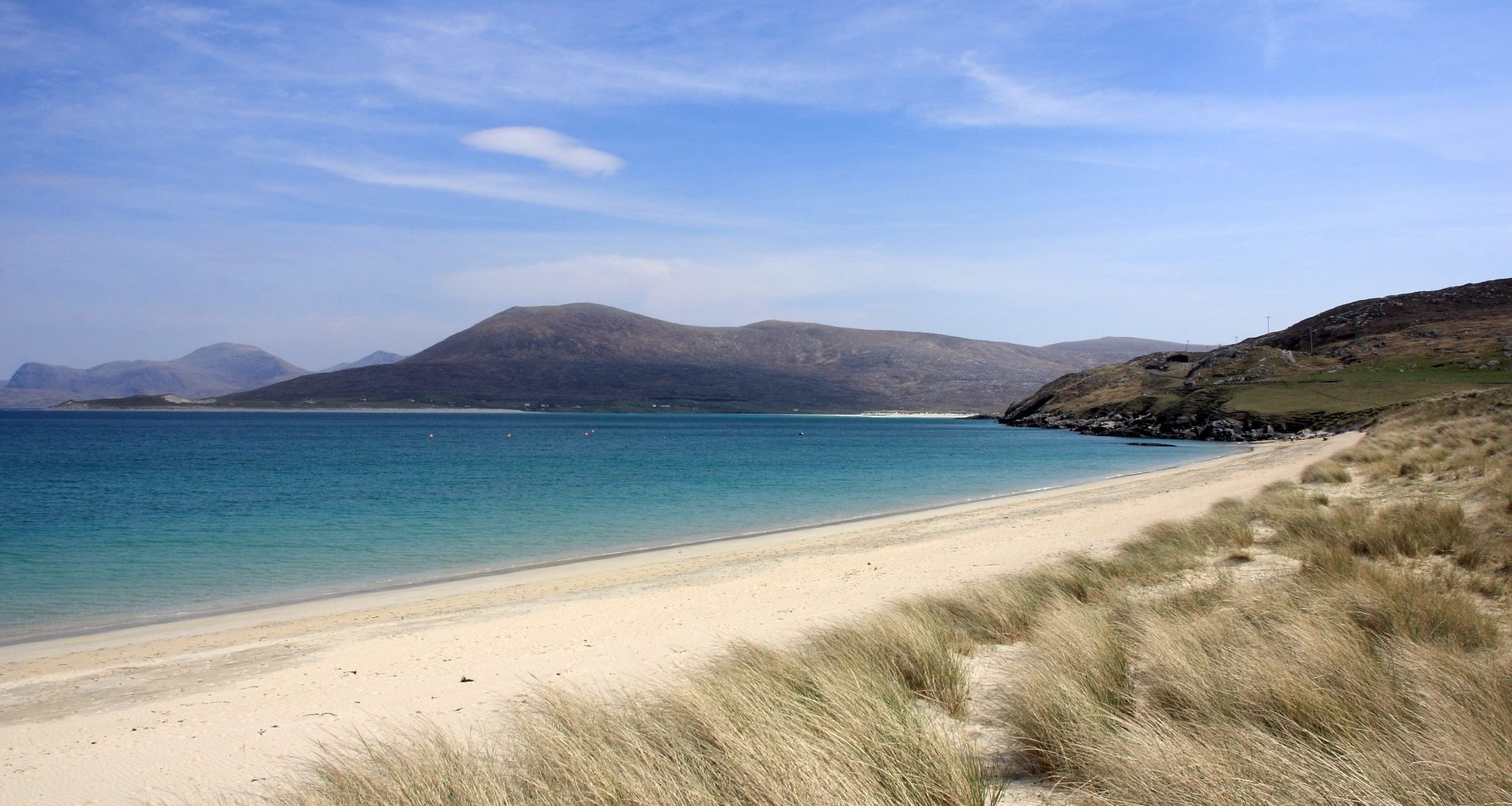
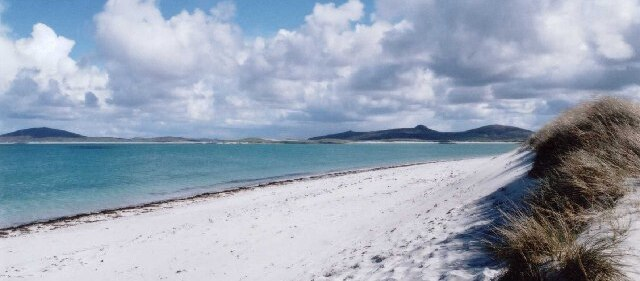
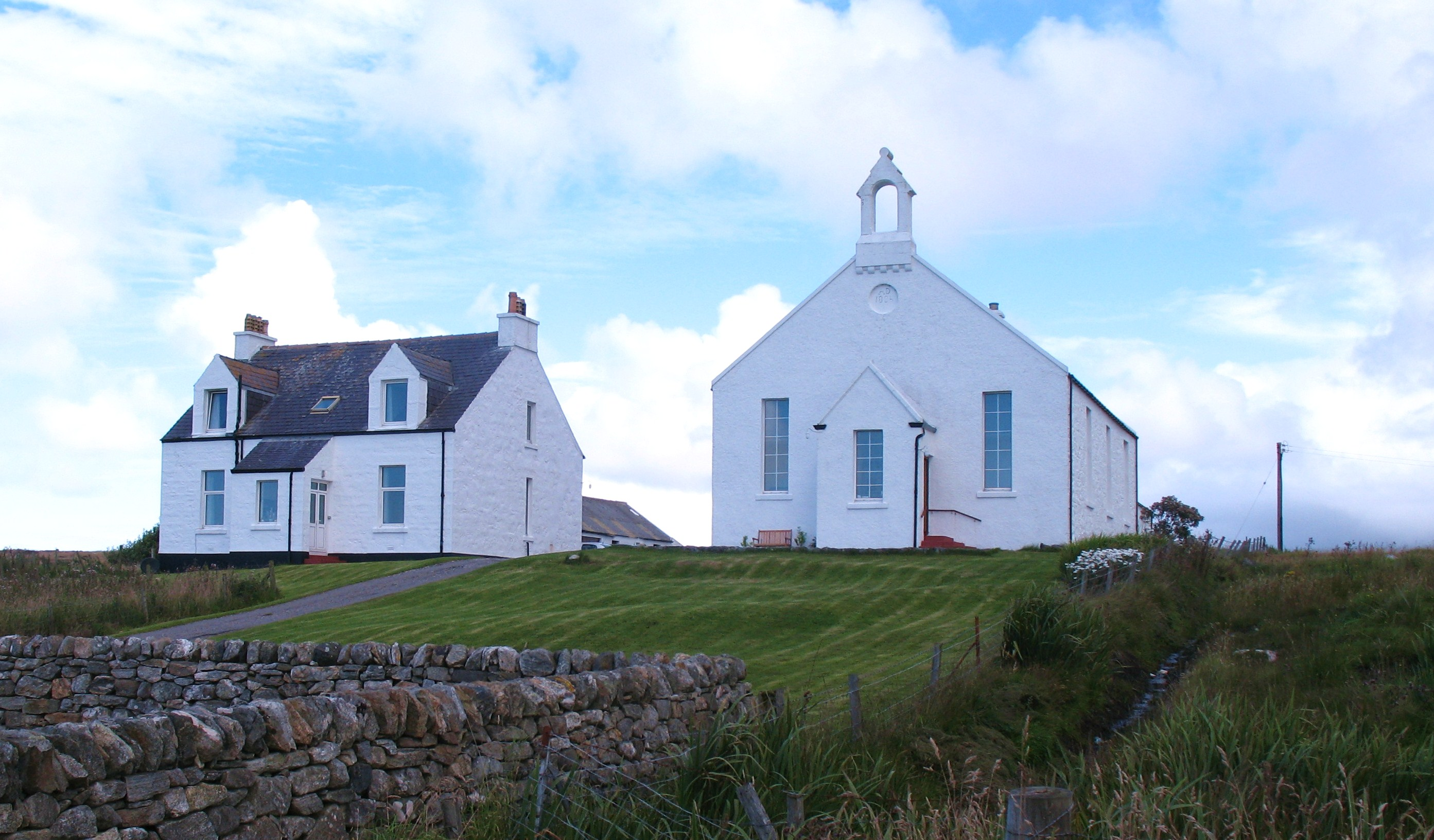
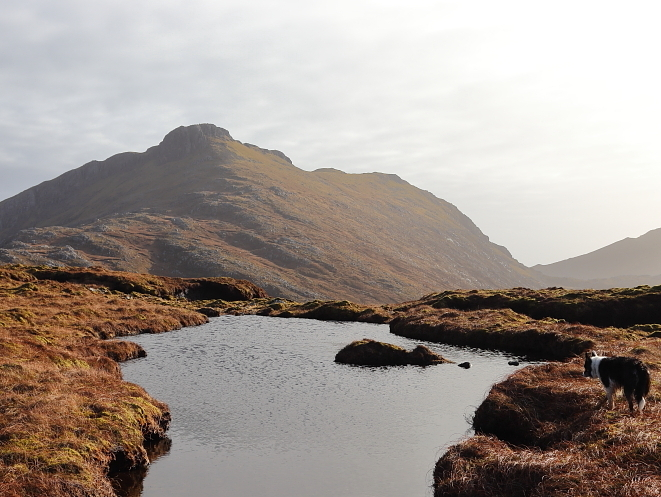
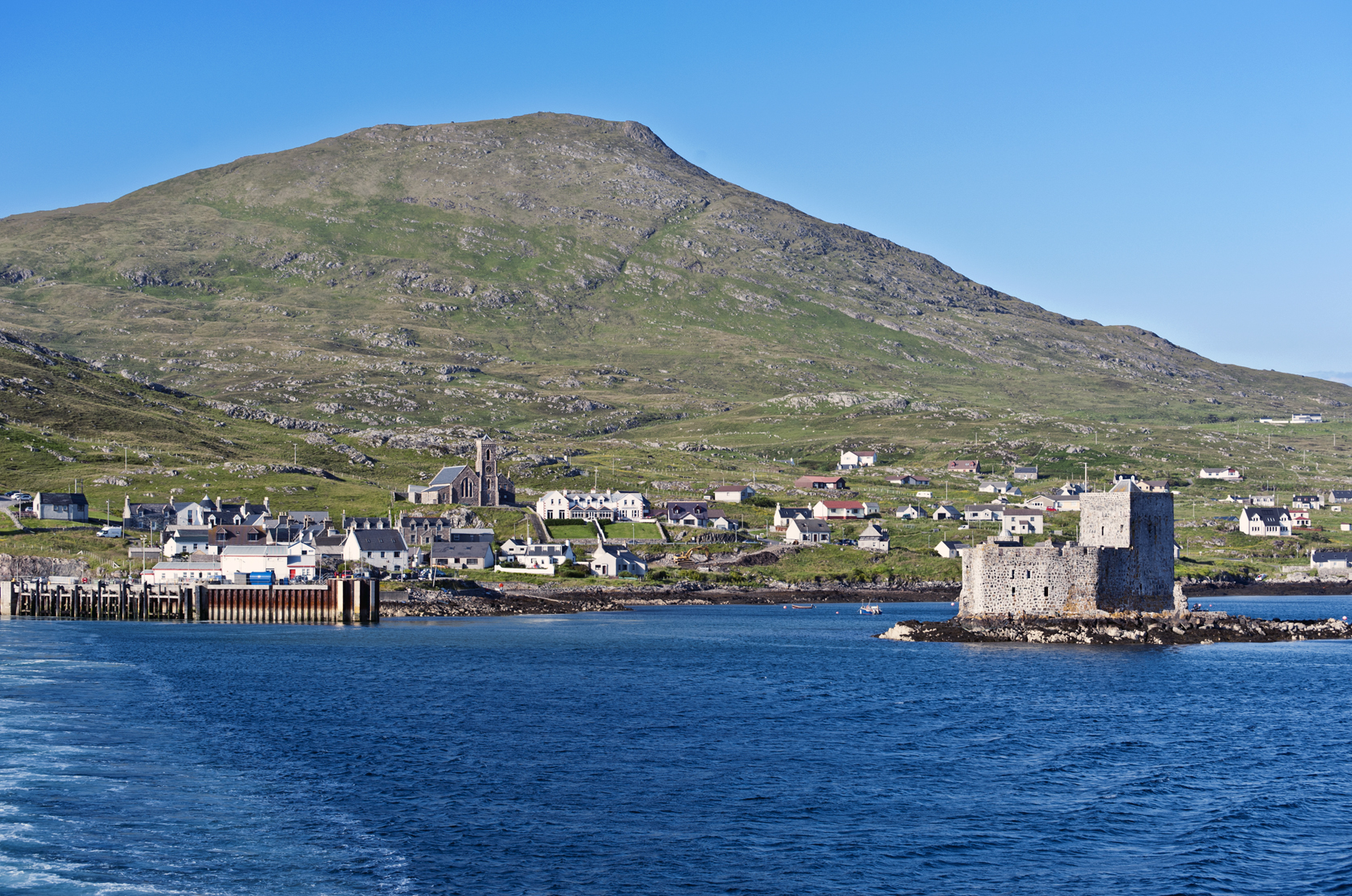
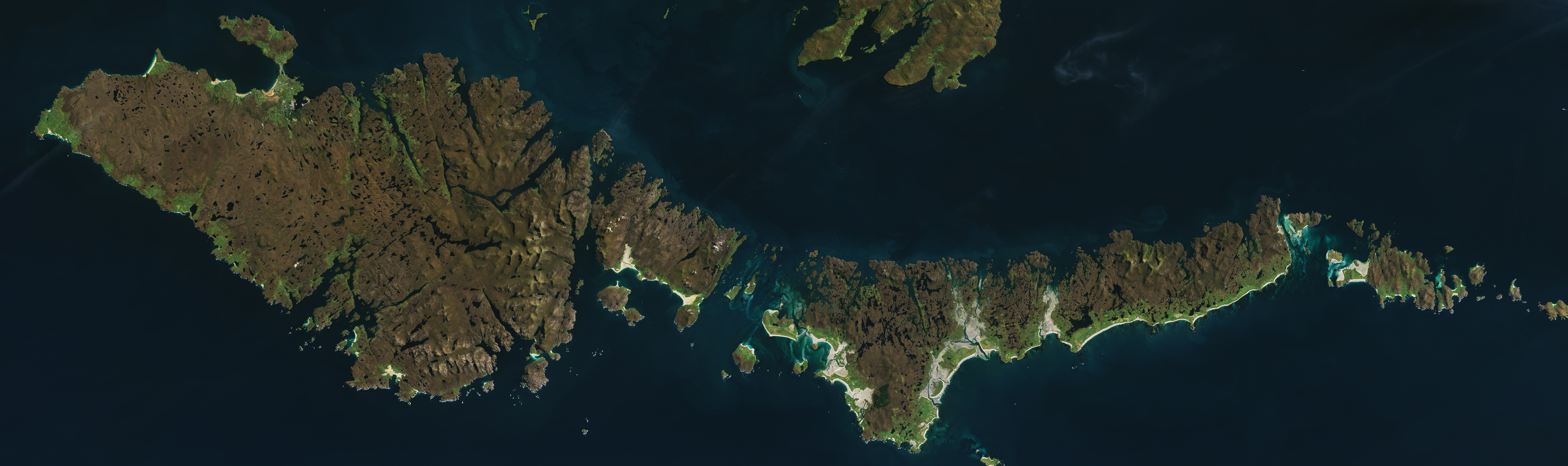
- Garenin, Lewis Nisabost, Harris North Uist near Solas Church on Benbecula Ben Corrodale, S. Uist Castlebay, Barra The Outer Hebrides from space, east on top

Location
- Map of the Outer Hebrides The Outer Hebrides within Scotland
- OS grid reference: NB426340
- Coordinates: 57.76°N 7.02°W

Name
- Name meaning: Western Isles
- Old Norse name: Suðreyjar

Physical geography
- Area: 3,056 km^{2} (1,180 sq mi)
- Highest elevation: Clisham 799 m (2,621 ft)

Administration
- Council area: Comhairle nan Eilean Siar
- Country: Scotland
- Sovereign state: United Kingdom

Demographics
- Population: 25,770 (2025)
- Population density: 8/km^{2} (21/sq mi)
- Largest settlement: Stornoway
- References: ISO Code: GB-ELS

The Outer Hebrides (Note: /ˈhɛbrɪdiːz/ HEB-rid-eez) or Western Isles (Note: Scottish Gaelic: na h-Eileanan Siar [nə ˈhelanən ˈʃiəɾ], na h-Eileanan an Iar [nə ˈhelanən əɲ ˈiəɾ] or na h-Innse Gall, 'Islands of the Strangers'), sometimes known as the Long Isle or Long Island (Note: Scottish Gaelic: an t-Eilean Fada), is an island chain off the west coast of mainland Scotland. It is the longest archipelago in the British Isles. (Note: Murray (1973) notes that "Western Isles" has tended to mean "Outer Hebrides" since the creation of the Na h-Eileanan an Iar or Western Isles parliamentary constituency in 1918. The phrase can also be used to refer to the Hebrides in general. Murray also notes that "Gneiss Islands"—a reference to the underlying geology – is another name used to refer to the Outer Hebrides but that its use is "confined to books".) The islands form part of the archipelago of the Hebrides, separated from the Scottish mainland and from the Inner Hebrides by the waters of the Minch, the Little Minch, and the Sea of the Hebrides. The Outer Hebrides are considered to be the traditional heartland of the Gaelic language. The islands form one of the 32 council areas of Scotland; since 1998, the area has used only the Gaelic form of its name, including in English language contexts. The council area is called Na h-Eileanan an Iar ('the Western Isles') and its council is Comhairle nan Eilean Siar ('Council of the Western Isles').

Most of the islands have a bedrock formed from ancient metamorphic rocks, and the climate is mild and oceanic. The 19 inhabited islands had an estimated population of 25,770 in 2025, and there are more than 50 substantial uninhabited islands. The distance from Barra Head to the Butt of Lewis is roughly 210 kilometres (130 mi).

There are various important prehistoric structures, many of which pre-date the first written references to the islands by Roman and Greek authors. The Western Isles became part of the Norse kingdom of the Suðreyjar, which lasted for over 400 years, until sovereignty over the Outer Hebrides was transferred to Scotland by the Treaty of Perth in 1266. Control of the islands was then held by clan chiefs, principal amongst whom were the MacLeods, MacDonalds, and the MacNeils. The Highland Clearances of the 19th century had a devastating effect on many communities, and it is only in recent years that population levels have ceased to decline. Much of the land is now under local control, and commercial activity is based on tourism, crofting, fishing, and weaving.

Sea transport is crucial for those who live and work in the Outer Hebrides, and a variety of ferry services operate between the islands and to mainland Scotland. Modern navigation systems now minimise the dangers, but in the past the stormy seas in the region have claimed many ships. The Gaelic language, religion, music and sport are important aspects of local culture, and there are numerous designated conservation areas to protect the natural environment.

== Etymology ==
The earliest surviving written references relating to the islands were made by Pliny the Elder in his Natural History, in which he states that there are 30 Hebudes, and makes a separate reference to Dumna, which Watson (1926) concludes is unequivocally the Outer Hebrides. Writing about 80 years later, in 140–150 AD, Ptolemy, drawing on the earlier naval expeditions of Agricola, also distinguished between the Ebudes, of which he writes there were only five (and thus possibly meaning the Inner Hebrides) and Dumna. Dumna is cognate with the Early Celtic dumnos and means the "deep-sea isle". Pliny probably took his information from Pytheas of Massilia who visited Britain sometime between 322 and 285 BC. It is possible that Ptolemy did as well, as Agricola's information about the west coast of Scotland was of poor quality. Breeze also suggests that Dumna might be Lewis and Harris, the largest island of the Outer Hebrides although he conflates this single island with the name "Long Island". Watson (1926) states that the meaning of Ptolemy's Eboudai is unknown and that the root may be pre-Celtic. Murray (1966) claims that Ptolemy's Ebudae was originally derived from the Old Norse Havbredey, meaning "isles on the edge of the sea". This idea is often repeated but no firm evidence of this derivation has emerged.

Other early written references include the flight of the Nemed people from Ireland to Domon, which is mentioned in the 12th-century Lebor Gabála Érenn and a 13th-century poem concerning Raghnall mac Gofraidh, then the heir to the throne of Mann and the Isles, who is said to have "broken the gate of Magh Domhna". Magh Domhna means "the plain of Domhna (or Domon)", but the precise meaning of the text is not clear.

In Irish mythology the islands were the home of the Fomorians, described as "huge and ugly" and "ship men of the sea". They were pirates who exacted tribute from the coasts of Ireland and one of their kings was Indech mac Dé Domnand (i.e. Indech, son of the goddess Domnu, who ruled over the deep seas).

== Geography ==
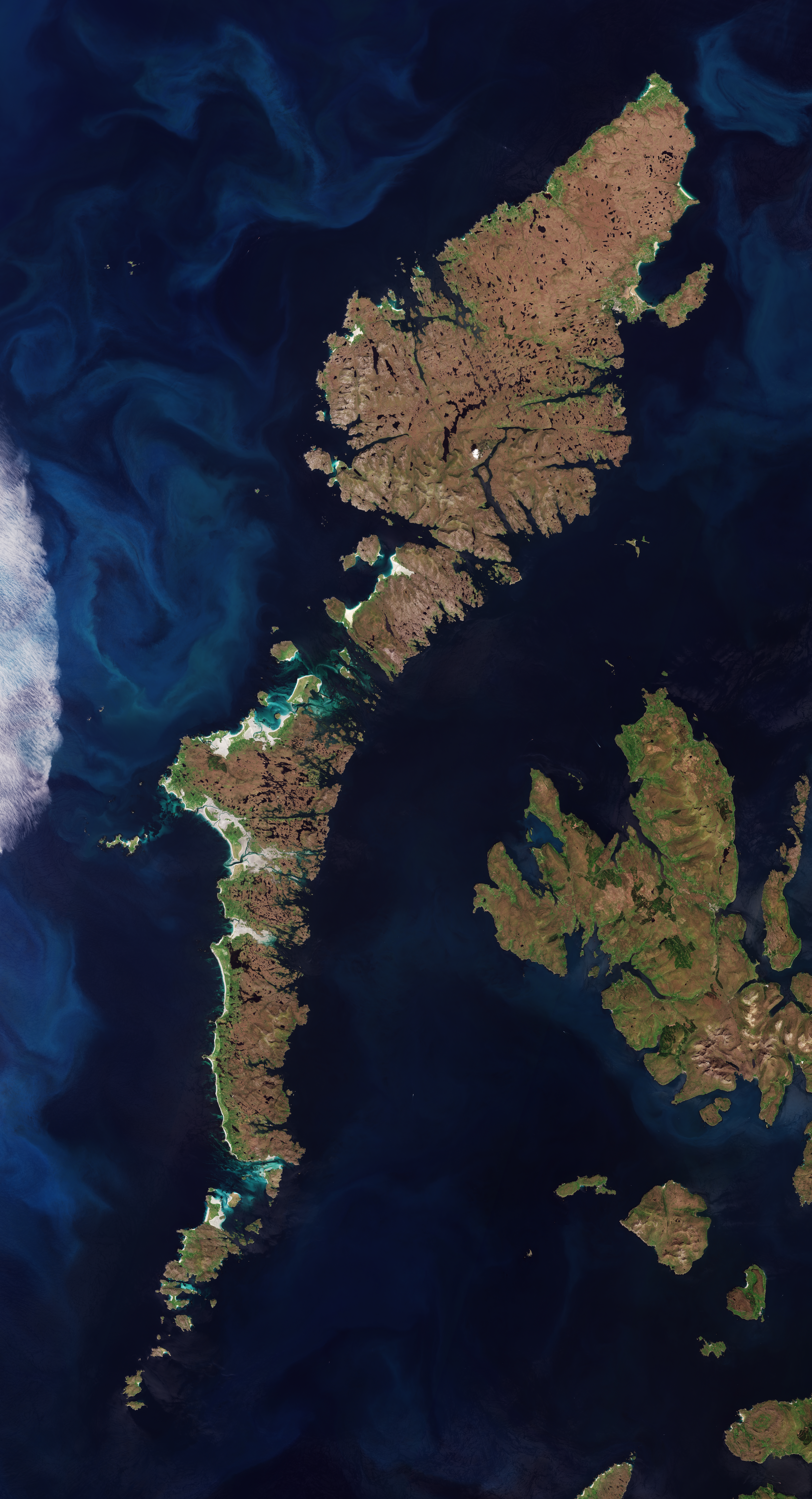
Satellite image of Outer Hebrides

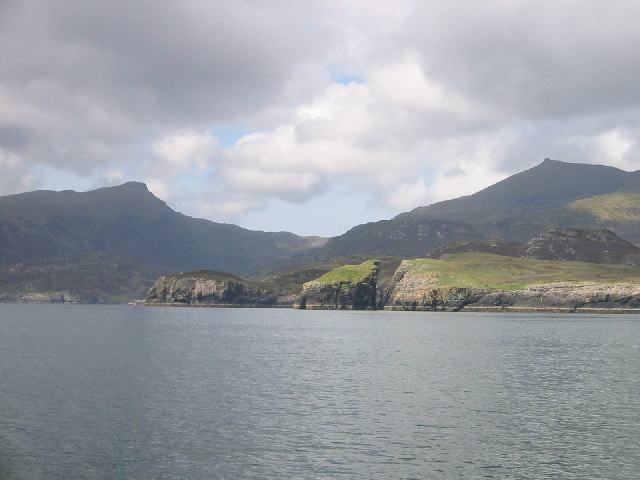
Nicolson's Leap on the east coast of South Uist. In the background are Beinn Mhòr at left, and Hecla on the right.

The islands form an archipelago whose major islands are Lewis and Harris, North Uist, Benbecula, South Uist, and Barra. Lewis and Harris has an area of 2,178.98 square kilometres (841 sq mi) and is the largest island in Scotland and the third-largest in the British Isles, after Great Britain and Ireland. It incorporates Lewis in the north and Harris in the south, both of which are frequently referred to as individual islands, although they are connected by land. The island does not have a single name in either English or Gaelic, and is referred to as "Lewis and Harris", "Lewis with Harris", "Harris with Lewis" etc.

The largest islands are deeply indented by arms of the sea such as Loch Ròg, Loch Seaforth and Loch nam Madadh. There are also more than 7,500 freshwater lochs in the Outer Hebrides, about 24% of the total for the whole of Scotland. North and South Uist and Lewis, in particular, have landscapes with a high percentage of fresh water and a maze and complexity of loch shapes. Harris has fewer large bodies of water but has innumerable small lochans. Loch Langavat on Lewis is 11 kilometres (7 mi) long, and has several large islands in its midst, including Eilean Mòr. Although Loch Suaineabhal has only 25% of Loch Langavat's surface area, it has a mean depth of 33 metres (108 ft) and is the most voluminous on the island. Of Loch Sgadabhagh on North Uist it has been said that "there is probably no other loch in Britain which approaches Loch Scadavay in irregularity and complexity of outline." Loch Bì is South Uist's largest loch and at 8 kilometres (5 mi) long it all but cuts the island in two.

Much of the western coastline of the islands is machair, a fertile low-lying dune pastureland. Lewis is comparatively flat, and largely consists of treeless moors of blanket peat. The highest eminence is Mealisval at 574 m (1,883 ft) in the south west. Most of Harris is mountainous, with large areas of exposed rock and Clisham, the archipelago's only Corbett, reaches 799 m (2,621 ft) in height. North and South Uist and Benbecula (sometimes collectively referred to as The Uists) have sandy beaches and wide cultivated areas of machair to the west and virtually uninhabited mountainous areas to the east. The highest peak here is Beinn Mhòr at 620 metres (2,034 ft). The Uists and their immediate outliers have a combined area of 745.4 square kilometres (288 sq mi). This includes the Uists themselves and the islands linked to them by causeways and bridges. Barra is 58.75 square kilometres (23 sq mi) in extent and has a rugged interior, surrounded by machair and extensive beaches.

The scenic qualities of the islands are reflected in the fact that three of Scotland's forty national scenic areas (NSAs) are located here. The national scenic areas are defined so as to identify areas of exceptional scenery and to ensure its protection from inappropriate development, and are considered to represent the type of scenic beauty "popularly associated with Scotland and for which it is renowned". The three NSA within the Outer Hebrides are:

- South Lewis, Harris and North Uist National Scenic Area covers the mountainous south west of Lewis, all of Harris, the Sound of Harris and the northern part of North Uist.
- An area of the south west coast of South Uist is designated as the South Uist Machair National Scenic Area.
- The archipelago of St Kilda is also listed as an NSA, alongside many other conservation designations.

=== Flora and fauna ===
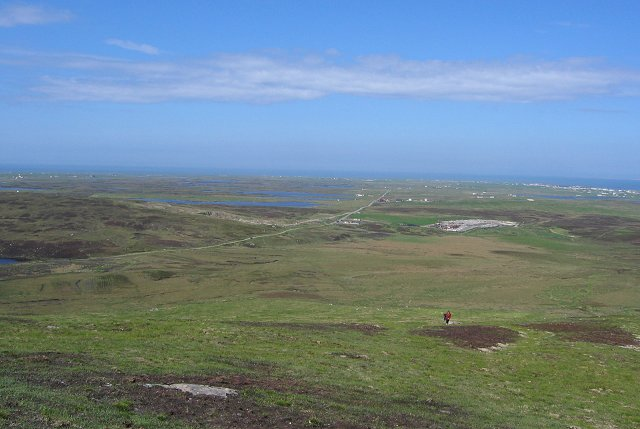
The open landscapes of Benbecula

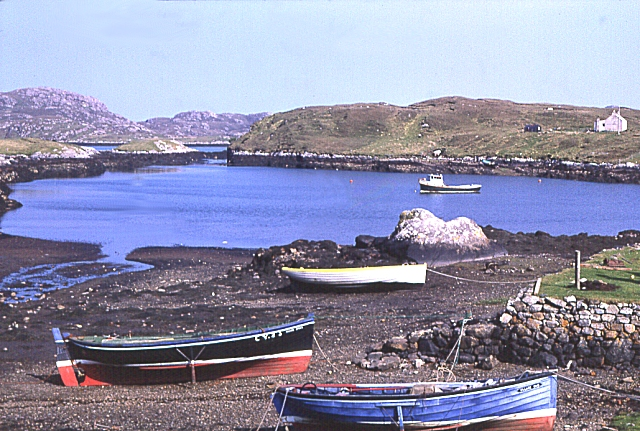
Bàgh Mòr, Grimsay

Much of the archipelago is a protected habitat, including both the islands and the surrounding waters. There are 53 Sites of Special Scientific Interest of which the largest are Loch an Duin, North Uist (151 square kilometres (37,000 acres)) and North Harris (127 square kilometres (31,000 acres)). South Uist is considered the best place in the UK for the aquatic plant Slender Naiad, which is a European Protected Species.

There has been considerable controversy over hedgehogs on the Uists. Hedgehogs are not native to the islands but were introduced in the 1970s to reduce garden pests. Their spread posed a threat to the eggs of ground-nesting wading birds. In 2003 Scottish Natural Heritage undertook culls of hedgehogs in the area, but these were halted in 2007; trapped animals are now relocated to the mainland.

Nationally important populations of breeding waders are present in the Outer Hebrides, including common redshank, dunlin, lapwing and ringed plover. The islands also provide a habitat for other important species such as corncrake, hen harrier, golden eagle and otter. Offshore, basking shark and various species of whale and dolphin can often be seen, and the remoter islands' seabird populations are of international significance. St Kilda has 60,000 northern gannets, amounting to 24% of the world population; 49,000 breeding pairs of Leach's petrel, up to 90% of the European population; and 136,000 pairs of puffin and 67,000 northern fulmar pairs, about 30% and 13% of the respective UK totals. Mingulay is an important breeding ground for razorbills, with 9,514 pairs, 6.3% of the European population.

The bumblebee Bombus jonellus var. hebridensis is endemic to the Hebrides and there are local variants of the dark green fritillary and green-veined white butterflies. The St Kilda wren is a subspecies of wren whose range is confined to the islands whose name it bears.

== Population ==
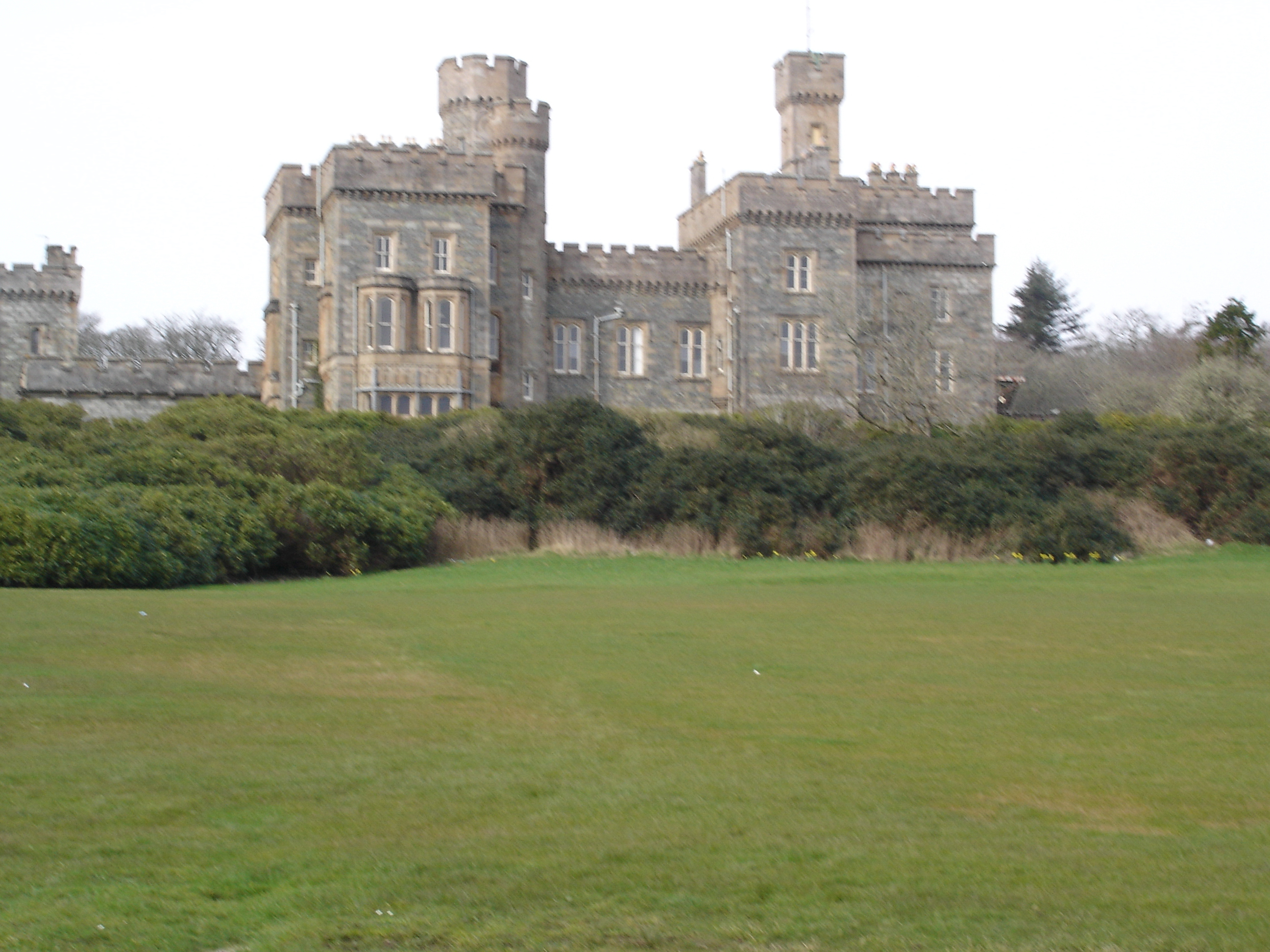
Lews Castle, Stornoway

Historical population
Year	Pop.	±%
1861	36,319	—
1901	46,172	+27.1%
1951	35,591	−22.9%
1961	32,609	−8.4%
1971	29,891	−8.3%
1981	30,702	+2.7%
1991	29,600	−3.6%
2001	26,502	−10.5%
2011	27,684	+4.5%
2022	26,140	−5.6%

The islands' total population was 26,502 at the 2001 census, and the 2011 figure was 27,684. During the same period Scottish island populations as a whole grew by 4% to 103,702. By 2025 the population was 25,770. The largest settlement in the Outer Hebrides is Stornoway on Lewis, which has a population of about 8,100.

The population estimate for 2019 was 26,720 according to a Comhairle nan Eilean Siar report which added that "the population of the Outer Hebrides is ageing" and that "young adults [...] leave the islands for further education or employment purposes". Of the total population, 6,953 people reside in the "Stornoway settlement Laxdale (Lacasdal), Sandwick (Sanndabhaig) and Newmarket" with the balance distributed over 280 townships.

In addition to the major North Ford (Oitir Mhòr) and South Ford causeways that connect North Uist to Benbecula via the northern of the Grimsays, and another causeway from Benbecula to South Uist, several other islands are linked by smaller causeways or bridges. Great Bernera and Scalpay have bridge connections to Lewis and Harris respectively, with causeways linking Baleshare and Berneray to North Uist; Eriskay to South Uist; Flodaigh, Seana Bhaile and the southern Grimsay to Benbecula; and the Vatersay Causeway linking Vatersay to Barra. This means that all the inhabited islands are now connected to at least one other island by a land transport route.

Geographic distribution of Gaelic speakers in Scotland (2011)

Island name		Population		2011 Gaelic speakers
English	Gaelic	2011	2001	2011 Gaelic speakers
Lewis and Harris	Leòdhas	21,031	18,500 (Lewis)	Parish / Speakers; Steòrnabhagh / 43% (5,492); Barabhas / 64% (2,037); Ceann a Tuath nan Loch / 53% (942); Ùig / 56% (873); Total / 49% (9,344)
Lewis and Harris	Na Hearadh	21,031	1,916 (Harris)	60% (1,212)
South Uist	Uibhist a Deas	1,754	1,818	60% (1,888 incl. Benbecula)
North Uist	Uibhist a Tuath	1,254	1,271	61% (887)
Benbecula	Beinn nam Fadhla	1,303	1,219	60% (1,888 with South Uist)
Barra	Barraigh	1,174	1,078	62% (761)
Others		1,168	700	13% (156)
Total		27,684	26,502	52% (14,248)

== Uninhabited islands ==
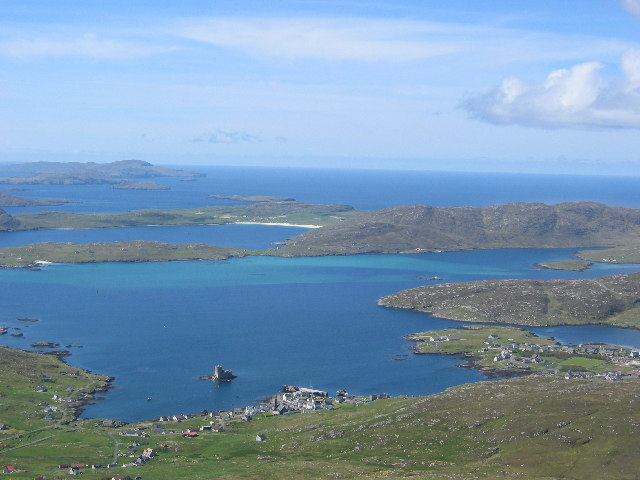
View of the Barra Isles from Heaval. The village of Castlebay is in the foreground, with Vatersay, and the uninhabited islands of Sandray, Pabbay, Mingulay and Berneray beyond.

There are more than fifty uninhabited islands greater in size than 40 hectares (99 acres) in the Outer Hebrides, including the Barra Isles, Flannan Isles, Monach Islands, the Shiant Islands and the islands of Loch Ròg. In common with the other main island chains of Scotland, many of the more remote islands were abandoned during the 19th and 20th centuries, in some cases after continuous habitation since the prehistoric period. More than 35 such islands have been identified in the Outer Hebrides alone. On Barra Head, for example, Historic Scotland have identified eighty-three archaeological sites on the island, the majority being of a pre-medieval date. In the 18th century, the population was over fifty, but the last native islanders had left by 1931. The island became completely uninhabited by 1980 with the automation of the lighthouse.

Some of the smaller islands continue to contribute to modern culture. The "Mingulay Boat Song", although evocative of island life, was written after the abandonment of the island in 1938 and Taransay was the setting for the BBC television series Castaway 2000. Others have played a part in Scottish history. On 4 May 1746, the "Young Pretender" Charles Edward Stuart hid on Eilean Liubhaird with some of his men for four days whilst Royal Navy vessels patrolled the Minch.

Smaller isles and skerries and other island groups pepper the North Atlantic surrounding the main islands. Some are not geologically part of the Outer Hebrides, but are administratively and in most cases culturally, part of Comhairle nan Eilean Siar. 73 kilometres (45 mi) to the west of Lewis lies St Kilda, now uninhabited except for a small military base. A similar distance to the north of Lewis are North Rona and Sula Sgeir, two small and remote islands. While Rona used to support a small population who grew grain and raised cattle, Sula Sgeir is an inhospitable rock. Thousands of northern gannets nest here, and by special arrangement some of their young, known as gugas, are harvested annually by the men of Ness. The status of Rockall, which is 367 kilometres (228 mi) to the west of North Uist and which the Island of Rockall Act 1972 decreed to be a part of the Western Isles, remains a matter of international dispute.

== Settlements ==
The largest settlements in the Outer Hebrides.

A 2018 development plan divides the Outer Hebrides settlements into four types: Stornoway core, main settlements, rural settlements and outwith settlements. The main settlements are Tarbert, Lochmaddy, Balivanich, Lochboisdale/Daliburgh, Greater Castlebay and greater Stornoway (excluding Stornoway core).

Combining with data from the National Records of Scotland, the principal settlements are:

Settlement	Population (2020)
Stornoway (Note: Part of the Stornoway settlement area which has a population of ca. 6,953 (2020).)	4,800
Newmarket, Laxdale and Marybank	1,610
Sandwick	870
Balivanich	510
Tarbert	< 500 (Note: Not listed in mid-2020 census, indicating a population of less than 500.)
Lochmaddy	< 500
Lochboisdale/Daliburgh	< 500
Castlebay	< 500

The dispersed settlements consisting of rural settlements and outwith settlements account for about two-thirds of the population of the council area, since the total population of the table is about 9,000.

== Geology ==
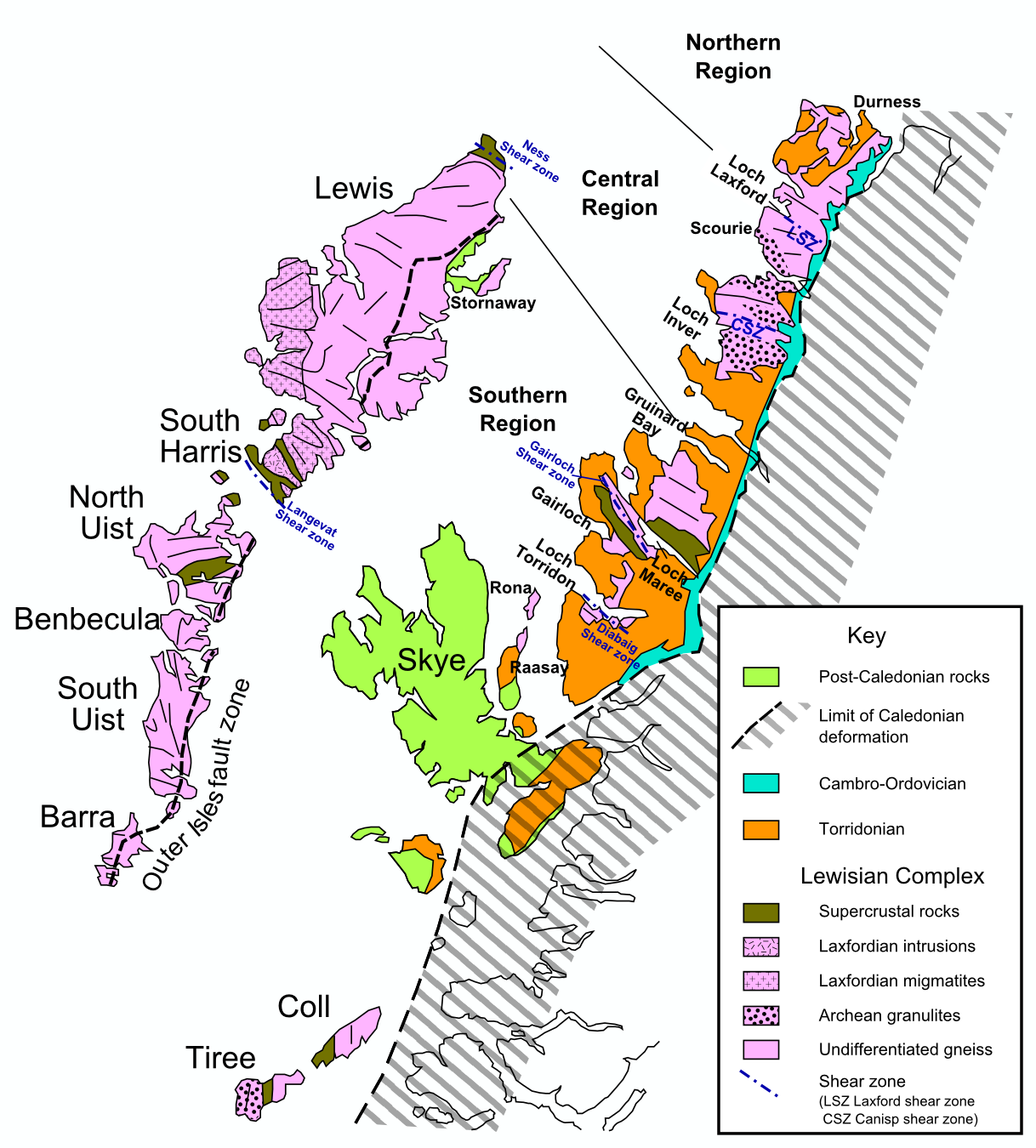
Geological map of the Hebridean terrane

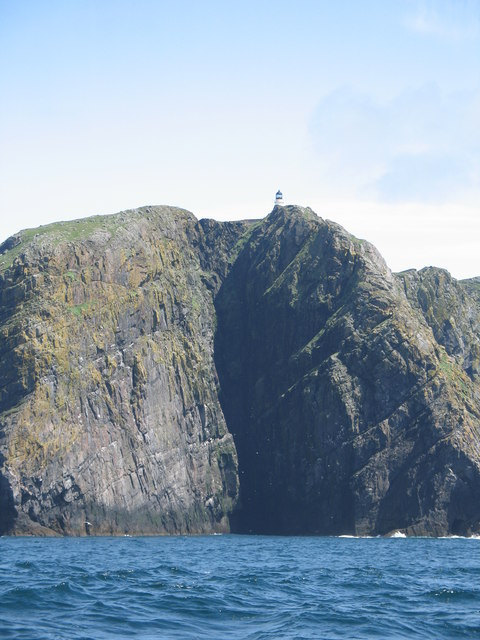
The "Old Boy" — the gneiss cliffs of Sloc na Bèiste, Barra Head, the southernmost point of the Outer Hebrides

Most of the islands have a bedrock formed from Lewisian gneiss. These are amongst the oldest rocks in Europe, having been formed in the Precambrian period up to three billion years ago. In addition to the Outer Hebrides, they form basement deposits on the Scottish mainland west of the Moine Thrust and on the islands of Coll and Tiree. These rocks are largely igneous in origin, mixed with metamorphosed marble, quartzite and mica schist and intruded by later basaltic dykes and granite magma. The gneiss's delicate pink colours are exposed throughout the islands and it is sometimes referred to by geologists as "The Old Boy". (Note: Lewisian gneiss is sometimes described as the oldest rock found in Europe, but trondhjemite gneiss recently measured at Siurua in Finland has been dated to 3.4–3.5 Ga.)

Granite intrusions are found in the parish of Barvas in west Lewis, and another forms the summit plateau of the mountain Roineabhal in Harris. The granite here is anorthosite, and is similar in composition to rocks found in the mountains of the Moon. There are relatively small outcrops of Triassic sandstone at Broad Bay near Stornoway. The Shiant Islands and St Kilda are formed from much later tertiary basalt and basalt and gabbros respectively. The sandstone at Broad Bay was once thought to be Torridonian or Old Red Sandstone.

== Climate ==
The Outer Hebrides have a cool temperate climate that is remarkably mild and steady for such a northerly latitude, due to the influence of the North Atlantic Current. The average temperature is 6 °C (44 °F) in January and 14 °C (57 °F) in summer. The average annual rainfall in Lewis is 1,100 millimetres (43 in) and sunshine hours range from 1,100 to 1,200 per year. The summer days are relatively long and May to August is the driest period. Winds are a key feature of the climate and even in summer there are almost constant breezes. According to the writer W. H. Murray if a visitor asks an islander for a weather forecast "he will not, like a mainlander answer dry, wet or sunny, but quote you a figure from the Beaufort Scale." There are gales one day in six at the Butt of Lewis and small fish are blown onto the grass on top of 190 metre (620 ft) high cliffs at Barra Head during winter storms.

== Prehistory ==
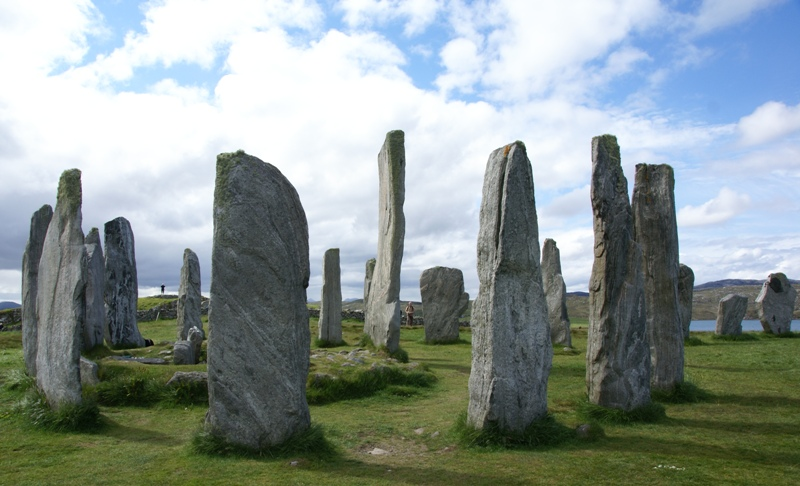
The Callanish Stones

The Hebrides were originally settled in the Mesolithic era and have a diversity of important prehistoric sites. Eilean Dòmhnuill in Loch Olabhat on North Uist was constructed around 3200–2800 BC and may be Scotland's earliest crannog (a type of artificial island). The Callanish Stones, dating from about 2900 BC, are the finest example of a stone circle in Scotland, the 13 primary monoliths of between one and five metres high creating a circle about 13 metres (43 ft) in diameter. Cladh Hallan on South Uist, the only site in the UK where prehistoric mummies have been found, and the impressive ruins of Dun Carloway broch on Lewis both date from the Iron Age.

== History ==
In Scotland, the Celtic Iron Age way of life, often troubled but never extinguished by Rome, re-asserted itself when the legions abandoned any permanent occupation in 211 AD. Hanson (2003) writes: "For many years it has been almost axiomatic in studies of the period that the Roman conquest must have had some major medium or long-term impact on Scotland. On present evidence that cannot be substantiated either in terms of environment, economy, or, indeed, society. The impact appears to have been very limited. The general picture remains one of broad continuity, not of disruption ... The Roman presence in Scotland was little more than a series of brief interludes within a longer continuum of indigenous development." The Romans' direct impact on the Highlands and Islands was scant and there is no evidence that they ever actually landed in the Outer Hebrides.

The later Iron Age inhabitants of the northern and western Hebrides were probably Pictish, although the historical record is sparse. Hunter (2000) states that in relation to King Bridei I of the Picts in the sixth century AD: "As for Shetland, Orkney, Skye and the Western Isles, their inhabitants, most of whom appear to have been Pictish in culture and speech at this time, are likely to have regarded Bridei as a fairly distant presence." The island of Pabbay is the site of the Pabbay Stone, the only extant Pictish symbol stone in the Outer Hebrides. This 6th century stele shows a flower, V-rod and lunar crescent to which has been added a later and somewhat crude cross.

=== Norse control ===
Location of the Kingdom of the Isles at the end of the eleventh century

Viking raids began on Scottish shores towards the end of the 8th century AD and the Hebrides came under Norse control and settlement during the ensuing decades, especially following the success of Harald Fairhair at the Battle of Hafrsfjord in 872. In the Western Isles Ketill Flatnose was the dominant figure of the mid 9th century, by which time he had amassed a substantial island realm and made a variety of alliances with other Norse leaders. These princelings nominally owed allegiance to the Norwegian crown, although in practice the latter's control was fairly limited. Norse control of the Hebrides was formalised in 1098 when Edgar, King of Scotland formally signed the islands over to Magnus III of Norway. The Scottish acceptance of Magnus III as King of the Isles came after the Norwegian king had conquered Orkney, the Hebrides and the Isle of Man in a swift campaign earlier the same year, directed against the local Norwegian leaders of the various islands‘ petty kingdoms. By capturing the islands Magnus imposed a more direct royal control, although at a price. His skald Bjorn Cripplehand recorded that in Lewis "fire played high in the heaven" as "flame spouted from the houses" and that in the Uists "the king dyed his sword red in blood". Thompson (1968) provides a more literal translation: "Fire played in the fig-trees of Liodhus; it mounted up to heaven. Far and wide the people were driven to flight. The fire gushed out of the houses".

The Hebrides were now part of Kingdom of the Isles, whose rulers were themselves vassals of the Kings of Norway. The Kingdom had two parts: the Suðr-eyjar or South Isles encompassing the Hebrides and the Isle of Man; and the Norðr-eyjar or North Isles of Orkney and Shetland. This situation lasted until the partitioning of the Western Isles in 1156, at which time the Outer Hebrides remained under Norwegian control while the Inner Hebrides broke out under Somerled, the Norse-Celtic kinsman of the Manx royal house.

While the Norse settlers appear to have continued many of the livestock management practices of the late Pictish period, there is archaeological evidence in Uist of a shift from dairying to beef production at some locations. Evidence from Bornais, Cille Pheadar and Udal suggests a shift in the management of sheep from lamb and mutton to ewes' milk and wool production. Browsing by goats, which were introduced during the tenth century, probably put additional pressure on relict woodland, leading to increased reliance on heather and peat for fuel.

Following the ill-fated 1263 expedition of Haakon IV of Norway, the Outer Hebrides along with the Isle of Man, were yielded to the Kingdom of Scotland a result of the 1266 Treaty of Perth. Although their contribution to the islands can still be found in personal and placenames, the archaeological record of the Norse period is very limited. The best known find from this time is the Lewis chessmen, which date from the mid 12th century.

=== Scots rule ===
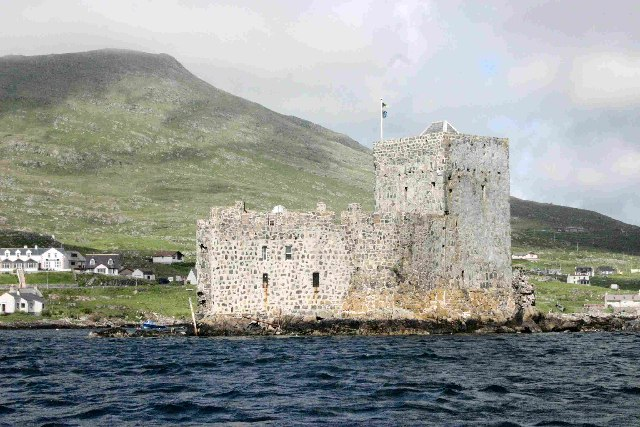
Kisimul Castle, the ancient seat of Clan MacNeil, Castlebay, Barra

As the Norse era drew to a close the Norse-speaking princes were gradually replaced by Gaelic-speaking clan chiefs including the MacLeods of Lewis and Harris, the MacDonalds of the Uists and MacNeil of Barra. (Note: The transitional relationships between Norse and Gaelic-speaking rulers are complex. The Gall-Ghàidhels who dominated much of the Irish Sea region and western Scotland at this time were of joint Gaelic and Scandinavian origin. When Somerled wrested the southern Inner Hebrides from Godred the Black in 1156, this was the beginnings of a break with nominal Norse rule in the Hebrides. Godred remained the ruler of Mann and the Outer Hebrides, but two years later Somerled's invasion of the former caused him to flee to Norway. Norse control was further weakened in the ensuring century, but the Hebrides were not formally ceded by Norway until 1266. The transitions from one language to another are also complex. For example, many Scandinavian sources from this period of time typically refer to individuals as having a Scandinavian first name and a Gaelic by-name.) This transition did little to relieve the islands of internecine strife although by the early 14th century the MacDonald Lords of the Isles, based on Islay, were in theory these chiefs' feudal superiors and managed to exert some control.

The growing threat that Clan Donald posed to the Scottish crown led to the forcible dissolution of the Lordship of the Isles by James IV in 1493, but although the king had the power to subdue the organised military might of the Hebrides, he and his immediate successors lacked the will or ability to provide an alternative form of governance. The House of Stuart's attempts to control the Outer Hebrides were then at first desultory and little more than punitive expeditions. In 1506 the Earl of Huntly besieged and captured Stornoway Castle using cannon. In 1540 James V himself conducted a royal tour, forcing the clan chiefs to accompany him. There followed a period of peace, but all too soon the clans were at loggerheads again.

In 1598 King James VI authorised some "Gentleman Adventurers" from Fife to civilise the "most barbarous Isle of Lewis". Initially successful, the colonists were driven out by local forces commanded by Murdoch and Neil MacLeod, who based their forces on Bearasaigh in Loch Ròg. The colonists tried again in 1605 with the same result but a third attempt in 1607 was more successful, and in due course Stornoway became a Burgh of Barony. By this time Lewis was held by the Mackenzies of Kintail, (later the Earls of Seaforth), who pursued a more enlightened approach, investing in fishing in particular. The historian W. C. MacKenzie was moved to write:

At the end of the 17th century, the picture we have of Lewis that of a people pursuing their avocation in peace, but not in plenty. The Seaforths ..., besides establishing orderly Government in the island.. had done a great deal to rescue the people from the slough of ignorance and incivility in which they found themselves immersed. But in the sphere of economics their policy apparently was of little service to the community.

The Seaforth's royalist inclinations led to Lewis becoming garrisoned during the Wars of the Three Kingdoms by Cromwell's troops, who destroyed the old castle in Stornoway and in 1645 Lewismen fought on the royalist side at the Battle of Auldearn. A new era of Hebridean involvement in the affairs of the wider world was about to commence.

=== British era ===
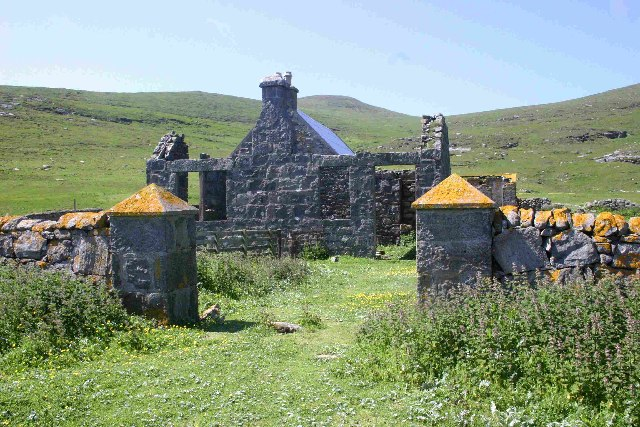
Abandoned school house, Mingulay

With the implementation of the Treaty of Union in 1707 the Hebrides became part of the new Kingdom of Great Britain, but the clans' loyalties to a distant monarch were not strong. A considerable number of islandmen "came out" in support of the Jacobite Earl of Mar in the "15" although the response to the 1745 rising was muted. Nonetheless, the aftermath of the decisive Battle of Culloden, which effectively ended Jacobite hopes of a Stuart restoration, was widely felt. The British government's strategy was to estrange the clan chiefs from their kinsmen and turn their descendants into English-speaking landlords whose main concern was the revenues their estates brought rather than the welfare of those who lived on them. This may have brought peace to the islands, but in the following century it came at a terrible price.

The Highland Clearances of the 19th century destroyed communities throughout the Highlands and Islands as the human populations were evicted and replaced with sheep farms. For example, Colonel Gordon of Cluny, owner of Barra, South Uist and Benbecula, evicted thousands of islanders using trickery and cruelty, and even offered to sell Barra to the government as a penal colony. Islands such as Fuaigh Mòr were completely cleared of their populations and even today the subject is recalled with bitterness and resentment in some areas. The position was exacerbated by the failure of the islands' kelp industry, which had thriven from the 18th century until the end of the Napoleonic Wars in 1815 and large scale emigration became endemic. For example, hundreds left North Uist for Cape Breton, Nova Scotia. The pre-clearance population of the island had been almost 5,000, although by 1841 it had fallen to 3,870 and was only 2,349 by 1931.

The Highland potato famine (Gaiseadh a’ bhuntàta, in Scottish Gaelic), caused by a blight, started in 1846 and had a serious impact, because many islanders were crofters; potatoes were a staple of their diet. Violent riots became common. Charities, encouraged by George Pole and others in the Commissariat (a military agency) encouraged charities to come to the rescue. The Free Church was particularly helpful, "delivering oatmeal to famine-affected families all across the West Highlands and Islands", according to one report. Another report states that the Church "was prompt in organising an efficient system of private charity across the Hebrides and on the Western seaboard. It cooperated with the Edinburgh and Glasgow Relief Committees".

An interdenominational charity was in place by early 1847 and took the most significant role in famine relief. Some landowners also provided a great deal of assistance, according to one history of the region: "MacLeod of Dunvegan bought in food for his people, some eight thousand of them" ... MacLean of Ardgour provided food, and introduced new crops into the area - peas, cabbages and carrots ... Sir James Matheson on Lewis spent £329,000 (Equivalent to £37,000,000 in 2024) on improving his lands, hoping to provide a more secure future for his people". The government of Britain provided some assistance, thanks to Sir Charles Trevelyan, who arranged for food distribution at Portree and Tobermory. The British Association for the Relief of Distress in Ireland and the Highlands and Islands of Scotland also helped as did donations received from North America. The blight struck again over the next two years, requiring an extra tax on landowners to help feed the population. The British government began encouraging mass emigration.

For those who remained new economic opportunities emerged through the export of cattle, commercial fishing and tourism. During the summer season in the 1860s and 1870s five thousand inhabitants of Lewis could be found in Wick on the mainland of Scotland, employed on the fishing boats and at the quaysides. Nonetheless, emigration and military service became the choice of many and the archipelago's populations continued to dwindle throughout the late 19th and 20th centuries. By 2001 the population of North Uist was only 1,271.

The work of the Napier Commission and the Congested Districts Board, and the passing of the Crofters' Holdings (Scotland) Act 1886 helped, but social unrest continued. In July 1906 grazing land on Vatersay was raided by landless men from Barra and its isles. Lady Gordon Cathcart took legal action against the "raiders" but the visiting judge took the view that she had neglected her duties as a landowner and that "long indifference to the necessities of the cottars had gone far to drive them to exasperation". Millennia of continuous occupation notwithstanding, many of the remoter islands were abandoned — Mingulay in 1912, Hirta in 1930, and Ceann Iar in 1942 among them. This process involved a transition from these places being perceived as relatively self-sufficient agricultural economies to a view becoming held by both island residents and outsiders alike that they lacked the essential services of a modern industrial economy.

There were gradual economic improvements, among the most visible of which was the replacement of the traditional thatched blackhouse with accommodation of a more modern design. The creation of the Highlands and Islands Development Board and the discovery of substantial deposits of North Sea oil in 1965, the establishment of a unitary local authority for the islands in 1975 and more recently the renewables sector have all contributed to a degree of economic stability in recent decades. The Arnish yard has had a chequered history but has been a significant employer in both the oil and renewables industries. Comhairle nan Eilean Siar, the local authority, employs 2,000 people, making it the largest employer in the Outer Hebrides. See also the "Innse Gall area plan 2010" and the Comhairle's "Factfile – Economy".

== Economy ==
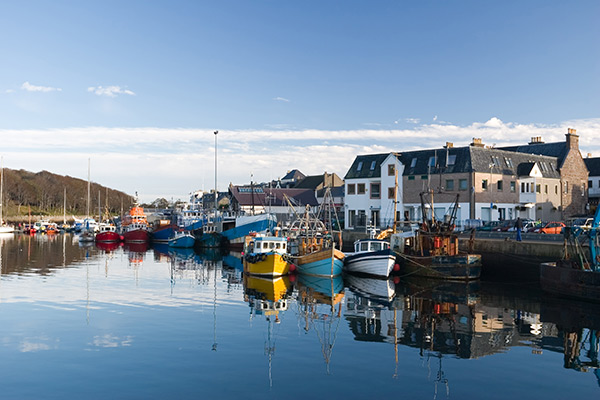
Stornoway Harbour

Modern commercial activities centre on tourism, crofting, fishing, and weaving including the manufacture of Harris tweed. Crofting remains popular especially on Lewis and Harris (population 21,000) with over 920 active crofters according to a 2020 report: "with crofts ranging in size from as small as a single hectare to having access to thousands of hectares through the medium of community grazing". Crofters can apply for subsidy grants; some of these are intended to help them find other avenues to supplement their incomes. Some of the funding schemes available to crofters in the Hebrides include the "Basic Payment Scheme, the suckler beef support scheme, the upland sheep support scheme and the Less Favoured Area support scheme and the Crofting Agricultural Grant Scheme (CAGS), as of March 2020.

According to the Scottish Government, "tourism is by far and away the mainstay industry" of the Outer Hebrides, "generating £65m in economic value for the islands, sustaining around 1000 jobs" The report adds that the "islands receive 219,000 visitors per year".

Some of the larger islands have development trusts that support the local economy and, in striking contrast to the 19th and 20th century domination by absentee landlords, more than two thirds of the Western Isles population now lives on community-owned estates. However the economic position of the islands remains relatively precarious. The Western Isles, including Stornoway, are defined by Highlands and Islands Enterprise as an economically "Fragile Area" and they have an estimated trade deficit of some £163.4 million. Overall, the area is relatively reliant on primary industries and the public sector, and fishing and fish farming in particular are vulnerable to environmental impacts, changing market pressures, and European legislation.

There is some optimism about the possibility of future developments in, for example, renewable energy generation, tourism, and education, and after declines in the 20th century the population has stabilised since 2003, although it is ageing. A 2019 report, using key assumptions, (mortality, fertility and migration) was less optimistic. It predicted that the population is "projected to fall to 22,709 by 2043"; that translates to a 16% decline, or 4,021 people, between 2018 and 2043.

The UK's largest community-owned wind farm, Beinn Ghrideag, is located outside Stornoway, and operated by Point and Sandwick Trust (PST). Beinn Ghrideag is a 9 MW project (consisting of three 3 MW wind turbines) that generates 30 GWh of electricity annually; its profits fund 80% of the Western Isles woodland project, which plants hundreds of thousands of native trees across the islands.

The Isle of Lewis web site states that Stornoway's sheltered harbour has been important for centuries; it was named Steering Bay by Vikings who often visited. A December 2020 report stated that a new deep water terminal was to be developed, the Stornoway Deep Water Terminal, using a £49 million investment. The plan included berths for cruise ships as long as 360 meters, berths for large cargo vessels, and a freight ferry berth.

== Politics and local government ==
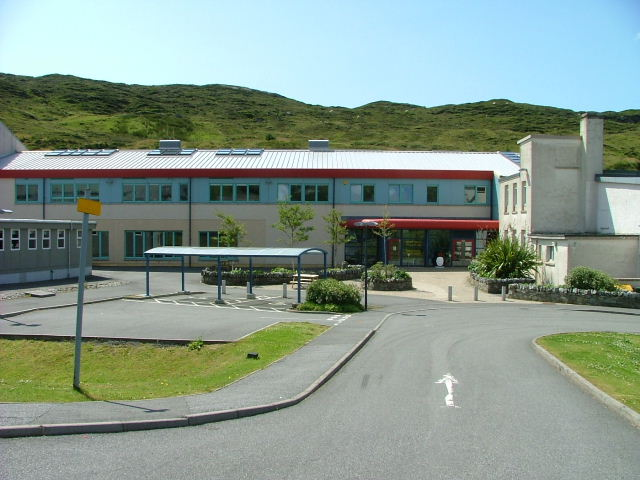
Sir Edward Scott Secondary School, Tarbert, Isle of Harris

The local authority is Comhairle nan Eilean Siar, based at the Council Offices in Stornoway. The council is often known locally simply as "the Comhairle" or a' Chomhairle.

=== Administrative history ===
After the Scottish crown claimed control of the islands, they were included in Inverness-shire. In 1661 Inverness-shire was split, with the northern parts becoming a new county called Ross-shire. The interests of landowners influenced the boundary of the new county. Kenneth Mackenzie, 3rd Earl of Seaforth, owned extensive lands in Ross on the mainland and also owned the Isle of Lewis. Lewis was therefore included in Ross-shire, whereas the rest of the Outer Hebrides stayed in Inverness-shire (including Harris, despite it being part of the same island as Lewis). In 1889, Ross-shire merged with Cromartyshire to form a new county called Ross and Cromarty.

Local government was reformed in 1975 under the Local Government (Scotland) Act 1973, which replaced Scotland's counties, burghs and landward districts. In most of Scotland a two-tier structure of upper-tier regions and lower-tier districts was used, but a single-tier structure of island areas was used for Orkney, Shetland and the Outer Hebrides, the latter being named the Western Isles. Further local government reform in 1996 introduced single-tier council areas across all of Scotland. The councils of the three island areas created in 1975, including the Western Isles, continued to provide the same services after 1996, but their areas were redesignated as council areas.

As part of the 1975 reforms the area was also made a lieutenancy area, represented by the Lord Lieutenant of the Western Isles.

In 1998, following the Local Government (Gaelic Names) (Scotland) Act 1997, the Western Isles Council formally changed the English language version of the council area's name from Western Isles to Na h-Eileanan an Iar (Gaelic for 'the Western Isles'), and the name of the council to Comhairle nan Eilean Siar ('Council of the Western Isles'), to be used in both English and Gaelic contexts.

=== Wider politics ===
The name for the British Parliament constituency covering this area is Na h-Eileanan an Iar, the seat being held by Torcuil Crichton MP since 2024, while the Scottish Parliament constituency for the area is Na h-Eileanan an Iar, the incumbent being Donald MacKinnon MSP.

During the 2014 Scottish independence referendum the area voted against independence by a margin of 53.42% (10,544) to 46.58% (9,195) in favour on a turnout of 86.2%

In 2022, as part of the Levelling Up White Paper, an "Island Forum" was proposed, which would allow local policymakers and residents in the Outer Hebrides to work alongside their counterparts in Shetland, Orkney, Anglesey and the Isle of Wight on common issues, such as broadband connectivity, and provide a platform for them to communicate directly with the government on the challenges island communities face in terms of levelling up.

== Scottish Gaelic language ==
Pronunciation samples
Scottish Gaelic	Pronunciation
A' Chomhairle	[ə ˈxõ.ərˠʎə]
An t-Eilean Fada	[əɲ tʰʲelan fat̪ə]
Comhairle nan Eilean Siar	[ˈkʰõ.ərˠʎə nə ˈɲelan ˈʃiəɾ]
guga	[ˈkukə]
Innse Gall	[ˈĩːʃə ˈkaulˠ̪]
Na h-Eileanan A-muigh	[nə ˈhelanən əˈmuj]
Na h-Eileanan an Iar	[nə ˈhelanən ə ˈɲiəɾ]
Na h-Eileanan Siar	[nə ˈhelanən ˈʃiəɾ]
Oitir Mhòr	[ˈɔʰtʲɪɾʲ ˈvoːɾ]
Sloc na Béiste	[ˈs̪lˠ̪ɔʰk nə ˈpeːʃtʲə]

The Outer Hebrides have historically been a very strong Scottish Gaelic (Gàidhlig) speaking area. Both the 1901 and 1921 census reported that all parishes were over 75% Gaelic speaking, including areas of high population density such as Stornoway. However, the Education (Scotland) Act 1872 mandated English-only education, and is now recognised as having dealt a major blow to the language. People still living can recall being beaten for speaking Gaelic in school. By 1971 most areas were still more than 75% Gaelic speaking – with the exception of Stornoway, Benbecula and South Uist at 50–74%.

In the 2001 census, each island overall was over 50% Gaelic speaking – South Uist (71%), Harris (69%), Barra (68%), North Uist (67%), Lewis (56%) and Benbecula (56%). With 59.3% of Gaelic speakers or a total of 15,723 speakers, this made the Outer Hebrides the most strongly coherent Gaelic speaking area in Scotland.

Most areas were between 60 and 74% Gaelic speaking and the areas with the highest density of over 80% are Scalpay near Harris, Newtonferry and Kildonan, whilst Daliburgh, Linshader, Eriskay, Brue, Boisdale, West Harris, Ardveenish, Soval, Ness, and Bragar all have more than 75%. The areas with the lowest density of speakers are Stornoway (44%), Braigh (41%), Melbost (41%), and Balivanich (37%).

The Gaelic Language (Scotland) Act was enacted by the Scottish Parliament in 2005 to provide continuing support for the language. However, by 2011 the overall percentage of Gaelic speakers in the Outer Hebrides had fallen to 52%, due to the increased presence of English-language residents.

The 2022 Scottish Census reported that out of 25,562 residents aged three and over, 11,780 (46.1%) considered themselves able to speak or read Gaelic.

In modern Gaelic the islands are sometimes referred to collectively as An t-Eilean Fada (the Long Island) or Na h-Eileanan a-Muigh (the Outer Isles). Innse Gall (islands of the foreigners or strangers) is also heard occasionally, a name that was originally used by mainland Highlanders when the islands were ruled by the Norse.

The individual island and place names in the Outer Hebrides have mixed Gaelic and Norse origins. Various Gaelic terms are used repeatedly:

Gaelic root	Derived forms	Anglicised as	Origin and meaning
-aigh		-ay/-ey	generally from the Norse øy meaning "island"
beag	bheag, bige, bhige, beaga, bheaga	beg	small
dearg	dhearg, deirge, dheirge, deirg, dheirg, dearga, dhearga	derg	red
dubh	dhubh, duibh, dhuibh, duibhe, dhuibhe, dubha, dhubha		black; hidden
glas	ghlas, glais, ghlais, glaise, ghlaise, glasa, ghlasa		grey, green
ear			east, eastern
eilean	eilein, eileanan		island
iar			west, western
mòr	mhòr, mòire, mhòire, mòra, mhòra, mòir, mhòir	more	big, great
rubha	rubhannan		promontory
sgeir	sgeirean	skerry	skerry; often refers to a rock or rocks that lie submerged at high tide. From Old Norse sker.

There are also several islands called Orasaigh from the Norse Örfirirsey meaning "tidal" or "ebb island".

=== Other languages ===
The 2022 Scottish Census reported that out of 25,559 residents aged three and over, 4,169 (16.3%) considered themselves able to speak or read the Scots language.

== Transport ==
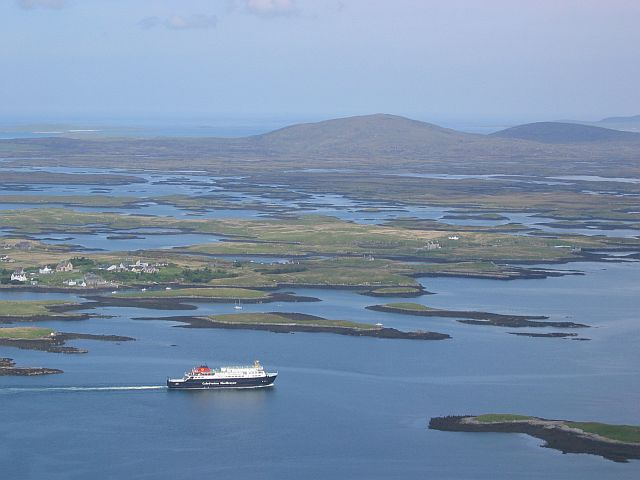
Caledonian MacBrayne ferry MV Hebrides leaving Lochmaddy, North Uist, en route for Skye

Scheduled ferry services between the Outer Hebrides and the Scottish mainland and Inner Hebrides operate on the following routes:

- Oban to Castlebay on Barra
- Oban to Lochboisdale on South Uist (winter only)
- Mallaig to Lochboisdale on South Uist
- Uig on Skye to Tarbert on Harris
- Uig on Skye to Lochmaddy on North Uist
- Ullapool to Stornoway on Lewis
- Tiree to Castlebay, Barra (summer only)

Other ferries operate between some of the islands.

National Rail services are available for onward journeys, from stations at Oban and Mallaig, which has direct services to Glasgow. However, parliamentary approval notwithstanding, plans in the 1890s to lay a railway connection to Ullapool were unable to obtain sufficient funding.

There are scheduled flights from Stornoway, Benbecula and Barra airports both inter-island and to the mainland. Barra's airport is claimed to be the only one in the world to have scheduled flights landing on a beach. At high water the runways are under the sea so flight times vary with the tide.

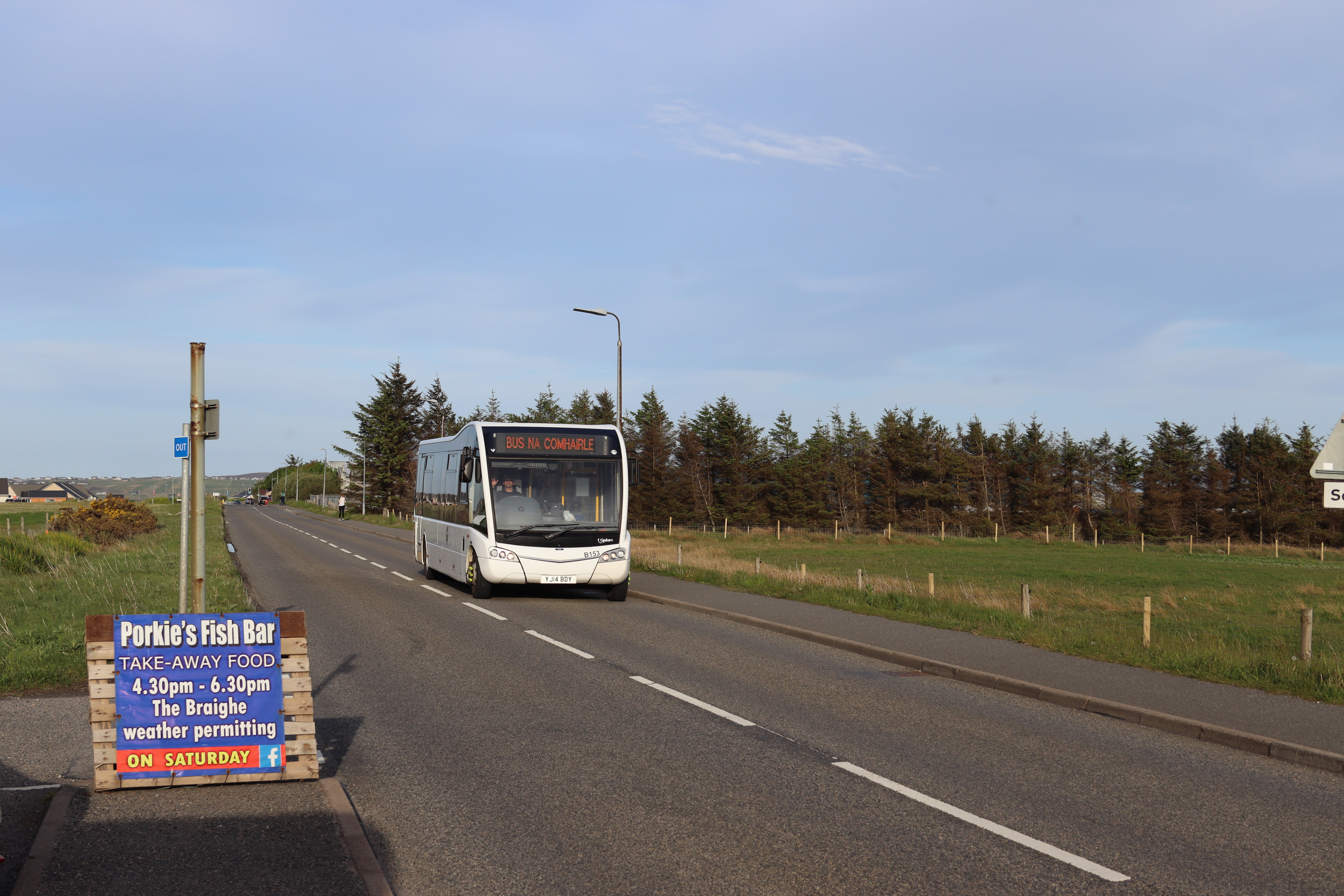
Bus Na Comhairle Optare Solo YJ14 BDY seen in Sandwick, May 2020

=== Bus na Comhairle ===
Bus na Comhairle (meaning "Bus of the Council") is the council-owned local bus company of the Western Isles. The company serves the Broadbay area of Lewis with 7 buses: 6 Optare Solos and 1 ADL Enviro 200.

=== Shipwrecks ===
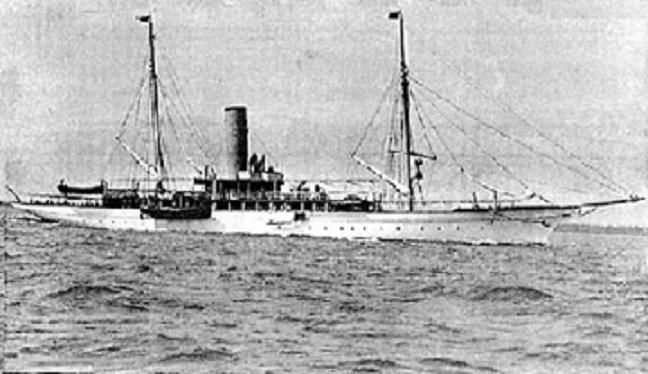
The Admiralty yacht HMS Iolaire

The archipelago is exposed to wind and tide, and lighthouses are sited as an aid to navigation at locations from Barra Head in the south to the Butt of Lewis in the north. There are numerous sites of wrecked ships, and the Flannan Isles are the location of an enduring mystery that occurred in December 1900, when all three lighthouse keepers vanished without trace.

Annie Jane, a three-masted immigrant ship out of Liverpool bound for Montreal, Canada, struck rocks off the West Beach of Vatersay during a storm on Tuesday 28 September 1853. Within ten minutes the ship began to founder and break up, casting 450 people into the sea. In spite of the conditions, islanders tried to rescue the passengers and crew. The remains of 350 men, women and children were buried in the dunes behind the beach and a small cairn and monument marks the site.

The tiny Beasts of Holm off the east coast of Lewis were the site of the sinking of HMS Iolaire during the first few hours of 1919, one of the worst maritime disasters in United Kingdom waters during the 20th century. Calvay in the Sound of Barra provided the inspiration for Compton Mackenzie's novel Whisky Galore after the SS Politician ran aground there with a cargo of single malt whisky in 1941.

== Culture ==
Christianity has deep roots in the Western Isles, but owing mainly to the different allegiances of the clans in the past, the people in the northern islands (Lewis, Harris, North Uist) have historically been predominantly Presbyterian, and those of the southern islands (Benbecula, South Uist, Barra) predominantly Roman Catholic.

At the time of the 2001 Census, 42% of the population identified themselves as being affiliated with the Church of Scotland, with 13% Roman Catholic and 28% with other Christian churches. Many of this last group belong to the Free Church of Scotland, known for its strict observance of the Sabbath. 11% stated that they had no religion. (Note: The 2001 census statistics used are based on local authority areas but do not specifically identify Free Church or Episcopal adherents. 4% of the respondents did not answer this census question and the total for all other religions combined is 1 per cent.) This made the Western Isles the Scottish council area with the smallest percentage of non-religious in the population. There are also small Episcopalian congregations in Lewis and Harris, and the Outer Hebrides are part of the Diocese of Argyll and The Isles in both the Episcopalian and Catholic traditions.

Gaelic music is popular in the islands and the Lewis and Harris Traditional Music Society plays an active role in promoting the genre. Fèis Bharraigh began in 1981 with the aim of developing the practice and study of the Gaelic language, literature, music, drama and culture on the islands of Barra and Vatersay. This two-week festival has inspired 43 other feisean throughout Scotland. The Lewis Pipe Band was founded in 1904 and the Lewis and Harris Piping Society in 1977.

Outdoor activities including rugby, football, golf, shinty, fishing, riding, canoeing, athletics, and multi-sports are popular in the Western Isles. The Hebridean Challenge is an adventure race, run in five daily stages, which takes place along the length of the islands and includes hill and road running, road and mountain biking, short sea swims and demanding sea kayaking sections. There are four main sports centres: Ionad Spors Leodhais in Stornoway, which has a 25 m swimming pool; Harris Sports Centre; Lionacleit Sports Centre on Benbecula; and Castlebay Sports Centre on Barra. The Western Isles is a member of the International Island Games Association.

South Uist is home to the Askernish Golf Course. The oldest links in the Outer Hebrides, it was designed by Old Tom Morris. Although it was in use until the 1930s, its existence was largely forgotten until 2005 and it is now being restored to Morris's original design.

== Places of interest ==
- Amhuinnsuidhe Castle
- An Lanntair
- Arnol Blackhouse
- Barra Airport
- Callanish Stones
- Dun Carloway
- Garenin
- Kisimul Castle
- Lews Castle
- St. Clement's Church
- St. Kilda
- St Moluag's Church

== See also ==
- Constitutional status of Orkney, Shetland and the Western Isles
- Hebridean Myths and Legends
- Leod
- List of Category A listed buildings in the Western Isles
- List of places in the Western Isles
- List of rulers of the Kingdom of the Isles
- List of islands of Scotland
- Ljótólfr
- Solar eclipse of 1 May 1185
- 2012 Comhairle nan Eilean Siar election
- Virtual Hebrides

== Sources ==
- Armit, Ian (1998) Scotland's Hidden History. Tempus (in association with Historic Scotland). ISBN 0-7486-6067-4
- Ballin Smith, B. and Banks, I. (eds) (2002) In the Shadow of the Brochs, the Iron Age in Scotland. Stroud. Tempus. ISBN 0-7524-2517-X
- Ballin Smith, Beverley; Taylor, Simon; Williams, Gareth (eds) (2007) West Over Sea: Studies in Scandinavian Sea-Borne Expansion and Settlement Before 1300. Leiden. Koninklijke Brill. ISBN 978-90-04-15893-1
- Benvie, Neil (2004) Scotland's Wildlife. London. Aurum Press. ISBN 1-85410-978-2
- Buxton, Ben (1995) Mingulay: An Island and Its People. Edinburgh. Birlinn. ISBN 1-874744-24-6
- Downham, Clare (2007) Viking Kings of Britain and Ireland: The Dynasty of Ívarr to A.D. 1014. Edinburgh. Dunedin Academic Press. ISBN 978-1-903765-89-0
- Gillen, Con (2003) Geology and landscapes of Scotland. Harpenden. Terra Publishing. ISBN 1-903544-09-2
- Gregory, Donald (1881) The History of the Western Highlands and Isles of Scotland 1493–1625. Edinburgh. Birlinn. 2008 reprint – originally published by Thomas D. Morrison. ISBN 1-904607-57-8
- Hanson, William S. "The Roman Presence: Brief Interludes", in Edwards, Kevin J. & Ralston, Ian B.M. (Eds) (2003) Scotland After the Ice Age: Environment, Archaeology and History, 8000 BC – AD 1000. Edinburgh. Edinburgh University Press.
- Haswell-Smith, Hamish. (2004) The Scottish Islands. Edinburgh. Canongate. ISBN 1-84195-454-3
- Hunter, James (2000) Last of the Free: A History of the Highlands and Islands of Scotland. Edinburgh. Mainstream. ISBN 1-84018-376-4
- Keay, J. & Keay, J. (1994) Collins Encyclopaedia of Scotland. London. HarperCollins. ISBN 0-00-255082-2
- Mac an Tàilleir, Iain (2003). "Ainmean-àite le buidheachas do dh' Iain Mac an Tailleir / Place-names collected by Iain Mac an Tailleir". The Scottish Parliament / Pàrlamaid na h-Alba. Archived from the original on 6 March 2021. "A'Chleit – Butt of Lewis" (PDF). Archived (PDF) from the original on 9 October 2022. "Cabaan – Eyre" (PDF). Archived (PDF) from the original on 9 October 2022. "Faddoch – Jura" (PDF). Archived (PDF) from the original on 9 October 2022. "Kallin – Ovie" (PDF). Archived from the original (PDF) on 16 November 2018. "Pabay – Yoker" (PDF). Archived from the original (PDF) on 26 May 2016.
- McKirdy, Alan Gordon, John & Crofts, Roger (2007) Land of Mountain and Flood: The Geology and Landforms of Scotland. Edinburgh. Birlinn. ISBN 978-1-84158-357-0
- Maclean, Charles (1977) Island on the Edge of the World: the Story of St. Kilda. Edinburgh. Canongate. ISBN 0-903937-41-7
- Malhotra, R. (1992) Anthropology of Development: Commemoration Volume in Honour of Professor I.P. Singh. New Delhi. Mittal. ISBN 81-7099-328-8
- Li, Martin (2005) Adventure Guide to Scotland. Hunter Publishing. Retrieved 19 May 2010.
- Miers, Mary (2008) The Western Seaboard: An Illustrated Architectural Guide. The Rutland Press. ISBN 978-1-873190-29-6
- Murray, John; Pullar, Laurence (1910). Bathymetrical Survey of the Fresh-Water Lochs of Scotland, 1897–1909. Edinburgh: Challenger Office. Archived from the original on 10 June 2023 – via National Library of Scotland.
- Murray, W.H. (1966) The Hebrides. London. Heinemann.
- Murray, W.H. (1973) The Islands of Western Scotland: the Inner and Outer Hebrides. London. Eyre Methuen. ISBN 0-413-30380-2
- Ross, David (2005) Scotland – History of a Nation. Lomond. ISBN 0-947782-58-3
- Rotary Club of Stornoway (1995) The Outer Hebrides Handbook and Guide. Machynlleth. Kittiwake. ISBN 0-9511003-5-1
- Thompson, Francis (1968) Harris and Lewis, Outer Hebrides. Newton Abbot. David & Charles. ISBN 0-7153-4260-6
- Watson, W. J. (1994) The Celtic Place-Names of Scotland. Edinburgh; Birlinn. ISBN 1-84158-323-5. First published 1926.
