= Vatersay =

Island in the Outer Hebrides of Scotland

Bhatarsaigh (Gaelic)
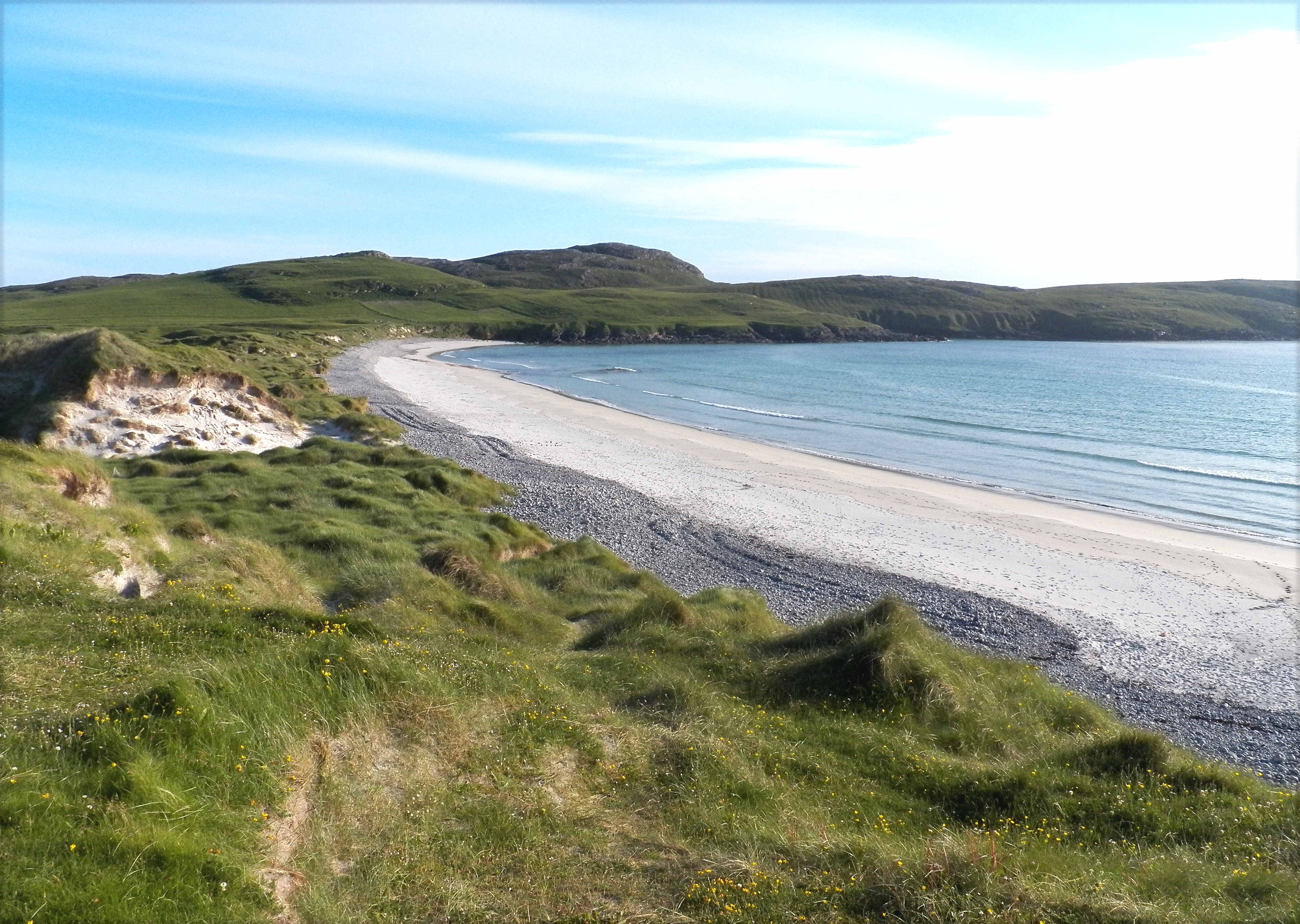
- Bàgh Siar (West Bay)

Location
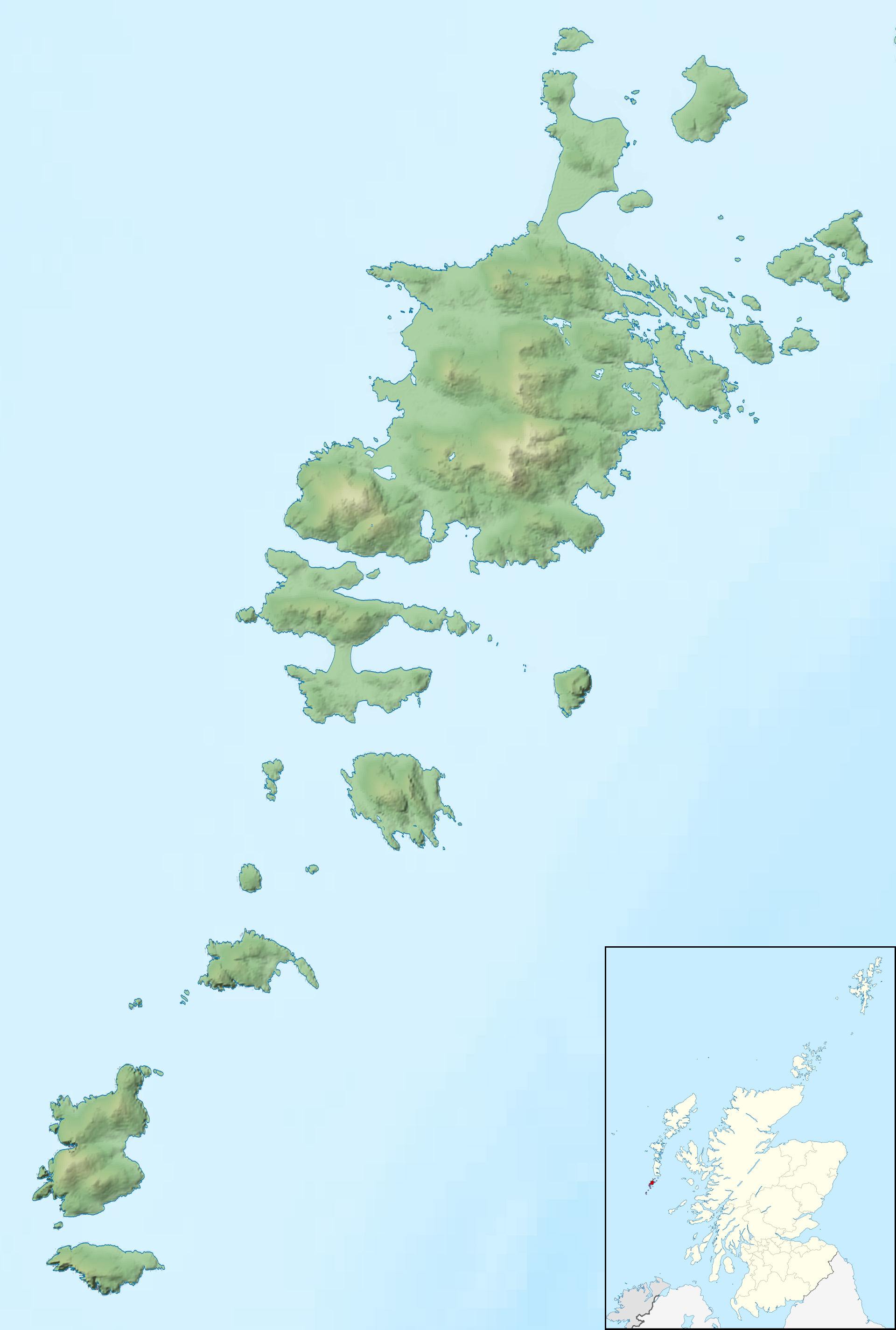
- Vatersay shown within the Bishop's Isles Vatersay shown within the Outer Hebrides
- OS grid reference: NL635955
- Coordinates: 56.93°N 7.53°W

Name
- Gaelic pronunciation: [ˈvaʰt̪əɾs̪aj]
- Name meaning: Water island

Physical geography
- Island group: Uist and Barra
- Area: 960 ha (3 3/4 sq mi)
- Area rank: 51
- Highest elevation: Heiseabhal Mòr, 190 m (623 ft)

Administration
- Council area: Comhairle nan Eilean Siar
- Country: Scotland
- Sovereign state: United Kingdom

Demographics
- Population: 83
- Population rank: 48
- Population density: 8.65/km^{2} (22.4/sq mi)
- Largest settlement: Baile Bhatarsaigh

The island of Vatersay (/ˈvætərseɪ/; Scottish Gaelic: Bhatarsaigh) is the southernmost and westernmost inhabited island in the Outer Hebrides of Scotland, and the settlement of Caolas on the north coast of the island is the westernmost permanently inhabited place in Scotland. (Note: It is also further west than anywhere in England or Wales, but settlements in Counties Fermanagh and Tyrone in Northern Ireland are further west, meaning that Vatersay is not the most westerly settlement in the United Kingdom.) The main village, also called Vatersay, is in the south of the island.

== Geography ==
One of the group of islands south of Barra which make up the Barra Isles, Vatersay is irregularly shaped and has a tombolo: it is composed of two rocky islands (north and south) linked by a sandy isthmus. The isthmus is covered in sand dunes and on either side are large white-sand beaches: Bàgh Siar (West Bay), and Bàgh Bhatarsaigh (Vatersay Bay) to the east. There are a number of beaches backed by sand dunes.

The island is about 3 miles (5 kilometres) from north to south, and the northern section of the island is about 3 1/2 mi (5.5 km) from west to east.

Vatersay is linked to the larger island of Barra to the north by the approximately 250-metre-long (820 ft) Vatersay Causeway, which was completed in 1991. This is of great benefit, as the shipping of goods and passenger traffic no longer has to rely on a small passenger ferry boat. Access to school and for emergency services is also much quicker and easier. The northern end of the causeway is about 2 mi (3 km) by road from Castlebay.

At low tide, the island is also linked to the islet of Uineasan to the east, which is about 5 hectares (12 acres), depending on the tide. To the south are the uninhabited islands of Pabbay, Mingulay and Sandray.

== Wildlife ==
Wildlife on the island includes Eurasian otters, seals and grey herons. Bonnie Prince Charlie's flower (Calystegia soldanella), reputedly originating from French seeds dropped by Bonnie Prince Charlie is, in Scotland, found only on Vatersay and Eriskay. Also found on Vatersay are Atlantic puffins.

== Archaeology ==
The island has remains of an Iron Age broch at Dun a' Chaolais overlooking the Sound of Vatersay, and nearby is a passage grave dated to the 3rd millennium BC. There is also a Bronze Age cemetery at Trèseabhaig south of the heights of Heiseabhal Mòr and a cairn built around 1000 BC west of the village of Vatersay. The offshore islet of Bioruaslum has a walled fort that may be of Neolithic provenance.

== Ownership ==
At the end of the nineteenth century, the existing landowner, wanting to use the whole of the island for their own farming purposes, evicted all the existing crofter inhabitants. Between 1902 and 1906, in a sequence of land raid actions, some of the men, the so-called "Vatersay Raiders", returned and took possession of land, claiming that an ancient law allowed a man to acquire land by building a wooden dwelling and lighting a fire on its hearth within a day. However, the landowner Lady Cathcart took them to court, and they were imprisoned. After much public protest at these events, in 1909, the Congested Districts Board (Scotland) bought Vatersay island for £6250 (equivalent to £643,000 in 2025), and it was divided into 58 crofts.

== Wrecks ==
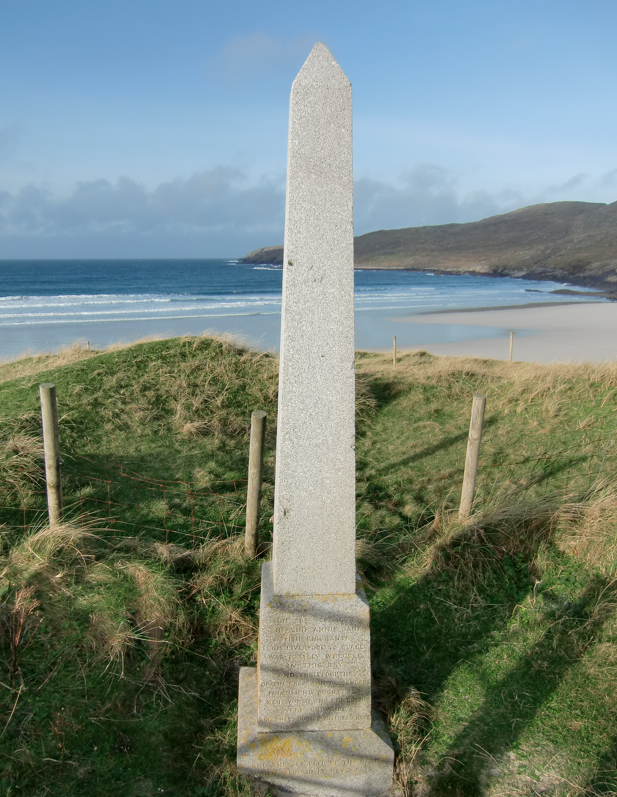
Monument to the wreck of the Annie Jane, overlooking the West Bay

In September 1853, the Annie Jane, a three-masted migrant ship out of Liverpool bound for Montreal, Quebec, Canada, struck rocks off West Beach during a storm. Within ten minutes the ship began to founder and break up, casting 450 people into the raging sea. In spite of the conditions, islanders tried to rescue the passengers and crew.

There were only a few survivors. A small cairn and monument marks the site where the bodies recovered from the sea were buried. An inscription reads:

On 28th September 1853 the ship Annie Jane with emigrants from Liverpool to Quebec was totally wrecked in this bay and threefourths of the crew and passengers numbering about 350 men women and children were drowned and their bodies interred here.

Two Chinese seamen from the SS Idomeneus, which sank on 28 September 1917, are also buried somewhere near the monument. There is a commemorative headstone in Cuier Churchyard.

The remains of a Catalina flying boat that crashed on the slopes of Heiseabhal Beag in 1944 lie in a stream bed near the shore.

== See also ==
- List of islands of Scotland
- Land raid

== Cited sources ==
- Branigan, Keith (2007) Ancient Barra: exploring the Archaeology of the Outer Hebrides. Comhairle nan Eilean Siar.
