= History of the Outer Hebrides =

History of the Scottish islands

The Hebrides were settled early on in the settlement of the British Isles, perhaps as early as the Mesolithic era, around 8500–8250 BC, after the climatic conditions improved enough to sustain human settlement. There are examples of structures possibly dating from up to 3000 BC, the finest example being the standing stones at Callanish, but some archaeologists date the site as Bronze Age. Little is known of the people who settled in the Hebrides but they were likely of the same Celtic stock that had settled in the rest of Scotland. Settlements at Northton, Harris, have both Beaker & Neolithic dwelling houses, the oldest in the Western Isles, attesting to the settlement.

== Celtic Era ==
The earliest written mention of the Outer Hebrides was by the Greek historian Diodorus Siculus in 55 BC. He wrote that there was an island called Hyperborea (which means "Far to the North") where a round temple stood from which the moon appeared only a little distance above the earth every 19 years, an apparent reference to the stone circle at Callanish. Pomponius Mela, a Roman-Spanish writer of the first century, refers to a group of seven islands to which he gave the name Haemodae. Other ancient writers such as Pliny the Elder, the Egyptian astronomer Ptolemy, and Solinus (3 AD) all seem to mention the Hebrides, attesting to some contact of the peoples there with the Roman world.

Little is known of the history of the peoples of the Hebrides before the 6th century as they, like the rest of Scotland, were in the depths of what centuries later became known as the Dark Ages. The first written records of the islands come with the arrival of St. Columba in the 6th century. It was this Irish-Scottish saint who first brought Christianity to the islands, founding several churches.

== Kingdom of the Isles ==
The Kingdom of the Isles (also known as the Kingdom of Mann and the Isles) was a Norse kingdom that existed in the British Isles from 1079 until 1266.

The kingdom was formed by Godred Crovan when he seized the Isle of Man from other Vikings, probably from Dublin in 1079. In the first two attempts at capturing the island Godred was defeated; it was only with his third try that he was victorious near Ramsey. Previously, the islands had been taken between c.700–900 AD, during the Viking invasions of Britain and Ireland. Up until the arrival of Godred the islands had been administered by the Norse Kingdoms of Dublin and Orkney. The later Kingdom of Mann was centred around the Isle of Man but also contained the Outer Hebrides, the Inner Hebrides forming the Kingdom of the Hebrides.

== The Hebrides under Norse control ==
Known as Suðreyar or southern islands in Old Norse. Norse control of the Hebrides was formalised in 1098 when Edgar of Scotland recognised the claim of Magnus III of Norway. The Scottish acceptance of Magnus III as King of the Isles came after the Norwegian king had conquered the Orkney Islands, the Hebrides and the Isle of Man in a swift campaign earlier the same year, directed against the local Norwegian leaders of the various islands. By capturing the islands Magnus III subdued the Norsemen who had seized the islands centuries earlier and imposed a more direct royal control.

The Norwegian control of both the Inner and Outer Hebrides would see almost constant warfare until being ultimately resolved by the partitioning of the Western Isles in 1156. The Outer Hebrides would remain under the Kingdom of Mann and the Isles while the Inner Hebrides broke out under Somerled, the Norse-Celtic kinsman of both Lulach and the Manx royal house. Although the Inner Hebrides, from 1156 known as the Kingdom of the Hebrides, was still nominally under the sovereignty of Norway, the leaders were Scottish in language and Gaelic in culture rather than Norse.

Two years after his victory of 1156 Somerled went on to seize control over the Isle of Man itself and become the last King of the Isle of Man and the Isles to rule over all the islands that the kingdom had once included. After Somerled's death in 1164 the rulers of Mann would no longer be in control of the Inner Hebrides.

== Scottish Control ==
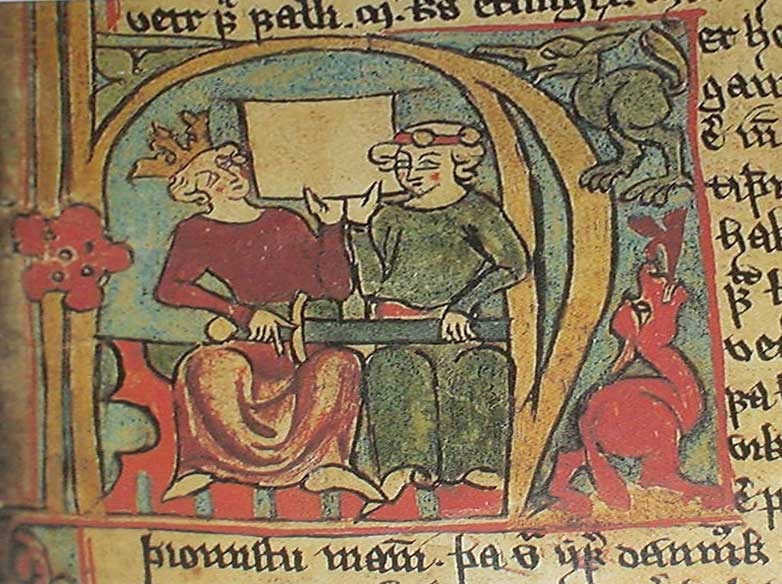
An illustration of Hákon, King of Norway, and Skule Bårdsson, from Flateyjarbók

In 1262 there was a Scottish raid on Skye, causing Haakon IV, King of Norway, to set sail for Scotland to settle the issue. Late in 1263 Haakon headed for Scotland with a large invasion force consisting of 200 ships and 15,000 men. The storms around the coast of Scotland took their toll on the Norwegian fleet, which at one point meant dragging forty ships overland to Loch Lomond. In the end a minor skirmish took place at the Battle of Largs where the Norwegians and their Manx allies under Magnus Olafsson of Mann and the Isles failed to achieve anything more than a minor tactical victory against the Scots led by Alexander Stewart. After the battle, bad weather forced the Norwegian-Manx fleet to sail back to the Orkney Islands. After arriving in Kirkwall, Haakon decided to winter in Bishop's Palace before resuming his campaign the following summer. This failed to occur as the king was struck by illness and died in his palace in December that same year. The death of Haakon left the crown to his son Magnus the Lawmaker, who considered peace with the Scots more important than holding on to the Norwegian possessions off western Scotland and in the Irish Sea. The Treaty of Perth of 1266 left the Hebrides and the Isle of Man to Scotland for 4,000 marks and an annual payment of 100 marks. The treaty also included that Scotland confirmed Norwegian sovereignty over Shetland and Orkney. Still, Scottish rule over the Isle of Man was finally confirmed only after the Manx under Guðrøðr Magnússon were decisively defeated in the 1275 Battle of Ronaldsway.

== History of Specific Islands ==
=== Barra ===
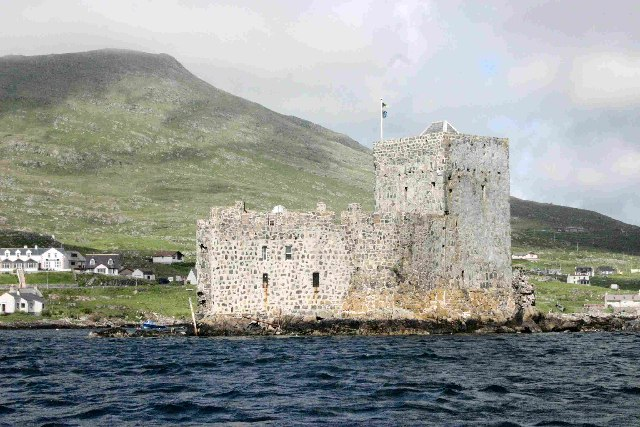
Kisimul Castle, Barra

The Clan MacNeil has strong ties to the Isle of Barra and can trace its lineage back to the O'Neills of Ulster who came to Barra from Ireland around the year 1000. Kisimul Castle at Castlebay is the hereditary seat of the MacNeils. It is located on an island in the bay, so giving the village its name. Other places of interest on the island include a blackhouse museum, a ruined church and museum at Cille Bharra, a number of Iron Age brochs such as those at Dùn Chuidhir and An Dùn Bàn, and a whole range of other Iron Age and later structures which have recently been excavated and recorded.

=== Flannan Isles ===
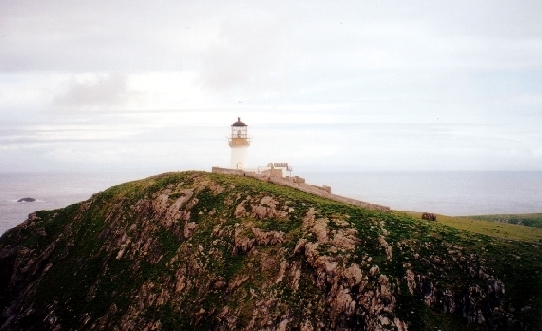
The lighthouse on Eilean Mòr. The Chapel of St Flannan can be seen on the slope to the right of the lighthouse.

As the name implies, Eilean Taighe, in the Flannan Isles, hosts a ruined stone shelter. Eilean Mòr is home to the lighthouse and a ruined chapel dedicated to St Flannan, which the lighthouse keepers refer to as the 'dog kennel' because of its very small size. These ruined bothies were collectively described by the Ancient Monuments Commission as The Bothies of the Clan McPhail or Bothain Chlann ‘ic Phaill. It is not entirely clear which St. Flannan the chapel honours. It is likely that he was either the 7th century Abbot of Killaloe in County Clare or alternatively the half brother of the 8th century St Ronan who gave his name to the nearby island of North Rona. There was also a certain Flann, son of an Abbot of Iona called Maol-duine who died in 890, and who may have loaned his name to these isolated isles.

The archipelago is also known as 'The Seven Hunters', and in the Middle Ages they may also have been called the 'Seven Haley (Holy) Isles'. Martin Martin (1703) lists a number of unusual customs associated with regular pilgrimages to Eilean Mòr such as removing one's hat and making a sunwise turn when reaching the plateau. It is possible that the saint or his acolytes lived on Eilean Mòr and perhaps Eilean Taighe as well. However, it is unlikely that there were permanent residents on the islands once the Celtic Church fell into decline in the Hebrides (as a result of 9th century Viking invasions), until the construction of the lighthouse and its occupation very shortly before the dawn of the 20th century.

=== Great Bernera ===
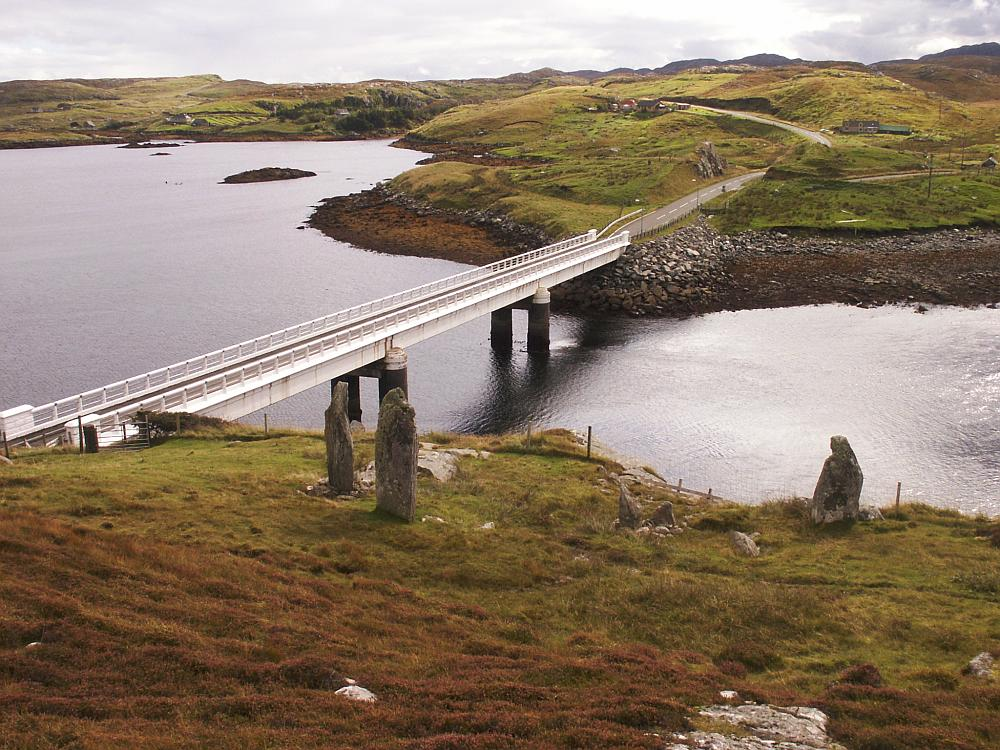
"Tursachan", the Callanish VIII megalithic monument on Great Bernera overlooks the bridge from Lewis

The main settlement on the island is Breaclete (Scottish Gaelic: Breacleit), home to a small museum. Bernera is also known for its Iron Age (or possibly Pictish) settlement at Bostadh, discovered in 1992 and now covered by sand to preserve it. A replica Iron Age house matching those now buried is sited nearby. The island was also the location of the Bernera Riot, where crofters resisted the Highland clearances.

=== Lewis ===
==== Historical Sites ====
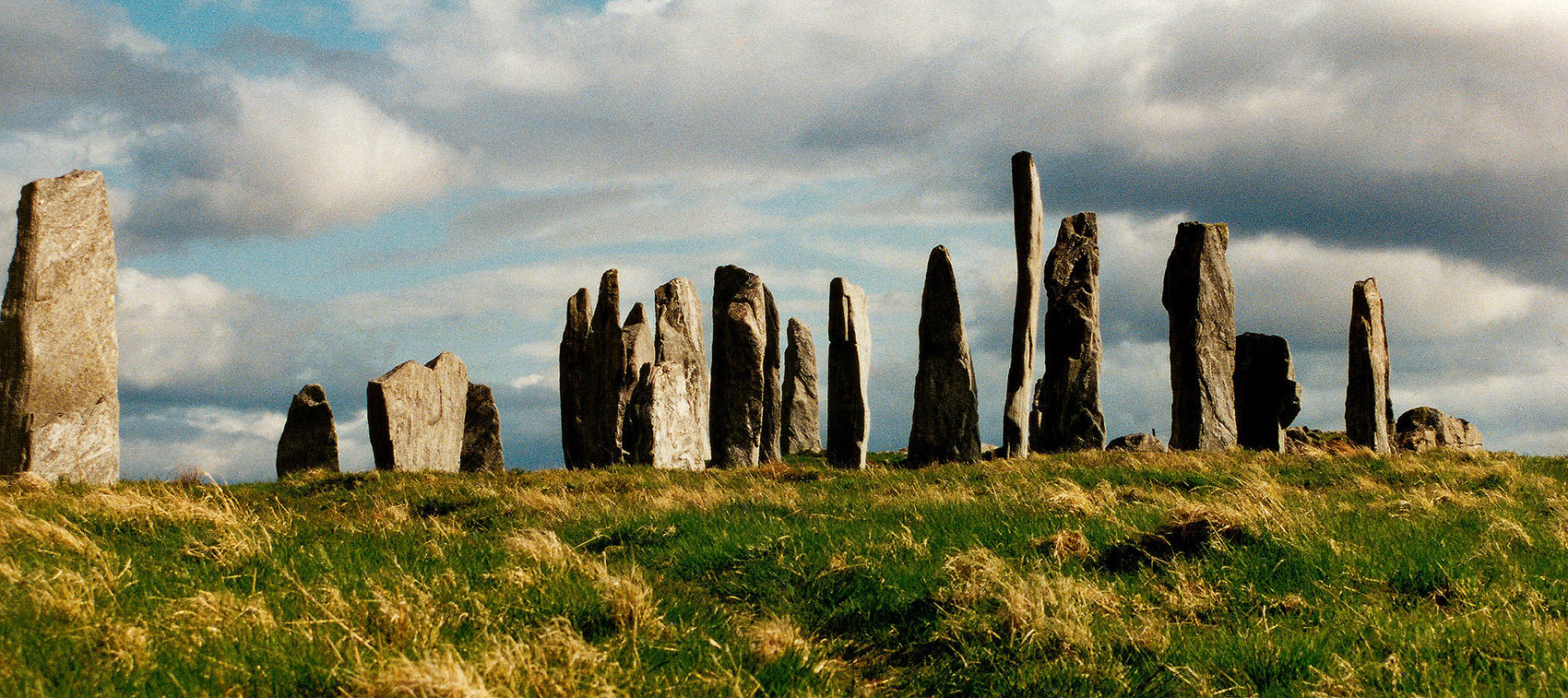
Callanish Stones

The Isle of Lewis has a variety of locations of historical and archaeological interest including:

- Callanish Stones;
- Dun Carloway Broch;
- Iron Age houses near Bostadh (Great Bernera);
- The Black House village at Garenin (Na Gearannan), near Carloway and the Black House at Arnol;
- St. Columba's church in Aignish;
- Teampull Mholuaidh in Ness;
- Clach an Truiseil monolith;
- Bonnie Prince Charlie's Monument, Arnish;
- Lews Castle;
- Butt of Lewis cliffs and Butt of Lewis Lighthouse;
- Dùn Èistean.

There are also numerous 'lesser' stone circles and remains of brochs.

==== Historical events ====
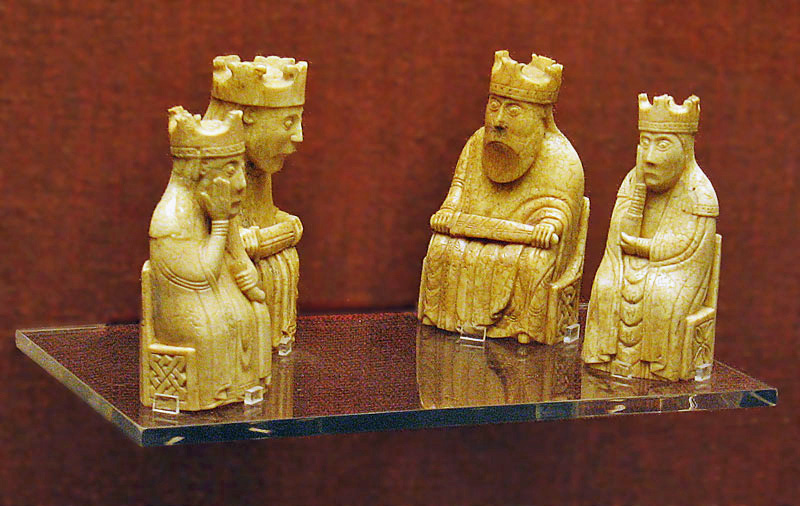
Two kings and two queens from the Lewis chessmen at the British Museum

- The first evidence of human habitation of the islands is found in peat samples which indicate that about 8,000 years ago, much of the native woodland was torched to make way for grassland to allow deer to graze.
- The earliest archaeological remains in Lewis date from about 5,000 years ago. At that time, people began to settle in permanent farms rather than following their herds. The small houses of these people have been found throughout the Western Isles, in particular, at Dail Mor in Lewis. The more striking great monuments of this period are the temples and communal burial cairns at places like Calanais.
- About 500 BC, island society moved into the Iron Age. The buildings became larger and more prominent, resulting in the brochs which were circular dry-stone towers belonging to the local chieftains, the best example of which in Lewis is at Dun Charlabhagh.
- 7th and 8th centuries AD: Christianity began to spread throughout the islands.
- 9th century AD: The Vikings arrived, intermarrying with local families and abandoning their pagan beliefs. At this time, most buildings changed their forms from round to rectangular, following the Scandinavian style. At this time, Lewis was part of the Kingdom of Mann and the Isles and officially part of Norway. The Lewis chessmen, which were found on the island in 1831, date from the time of Viking rule. The people were called the Gall-Ghaidheil, the 'Foreigner Gaels', reflecting their mixed Scandinavian/Gaelic background and probably their bilingual speech.
- 1263 – The Battle of Largs: While not taking place in Lewis, it had a significant effect on Scotland's defeat of the Vikings, leading to Lewis, and the rest of the Islands, being ceded to Scotland in 1266.
- Amie MacRuari, wife of John of Islay, built Borve Castle on Benbecula Island sometime between 1344 and 1363
- 14th century: The Lordship of the Isles emerged as the most important power in northwestern Scotland. The Lords of the Isles were based on Islay, but controlled all of the Hebrides. They were descended from Somerled (Somhairle) Mac Gillibride, a Gall-Gaidheil lord who had held the Hebrides and West Coast two hundred years earlier.
- 18th century: Following the 1745 rebellion, and Prince Charles Edward Stewart's flight to France, the use of Gaelic was discouraged, rents were demanded in cash rather than kind, and the wearing of folk dress was made illegal. Emigration to the New World increasingly became an escape for those who could afford it during the latter half of the century.
- 19th century: Clearances by landlords forced vast numbers of people off their lands, and increased again the flood of emigrants. Lewis was the site of numerous 'land struggles' which have recently been commemorated in modern cairn-style monuments in various villages.
- 1914–1918: During the First World War, thousands of islanders served in the forces, many losing their lives.
- 1919: The Isle of Lewis suffered a terrible blow with the sinking of the Iolaire on New Year's Day at the close of the First World War. The Admiralty yacht "HMY Iolaire" sank within sight of Stornoway's harbour, killing over 200 naval reservists from the island who were returning home.
- 1939–1945: Again, Lewis contributed to the forces during the Second World War with most serving in the Royal and Merchant Navy. Again, many lives were lost. Following the war, many more inhabitants emigrated to the Americas and mainland Scotland.
- Medieval development of Stornoway was spurred on by the construction of the original castle in the High Middle Ages by the Nicolson (or MacNicol) family of Viking descent. Infighting between rival clans continued throughout the Late Middle Ages and resisted an attempt by James VI to colonise Lewis in 1597. The castle was destroyed by Oliver Cromwell's forces in the mid 17th century, and the ownership of Lewis passed from the MacKenzies of Kintail through the Seaforth family and Sir James Matheson (and his descendants) to William Lever, 1st Viscount Leverhulme.
- Lord Leverhulme finally gifted the town's parish to the Stornoway Trust, whose ownership remains to this day.

=== North Uist ===
North Uist has many prehistoric structures, including the Barpa Langass chambered cairn, the Pobull Fhinn stone circle and the Fir Bhreige standing stones.

=== Scalpay ===
Eilean Glas a tiny peninsula on Scalpay's eastern shore is home to the first lighthouse to be built in the Outer Hebrides.

=== South Uist ===
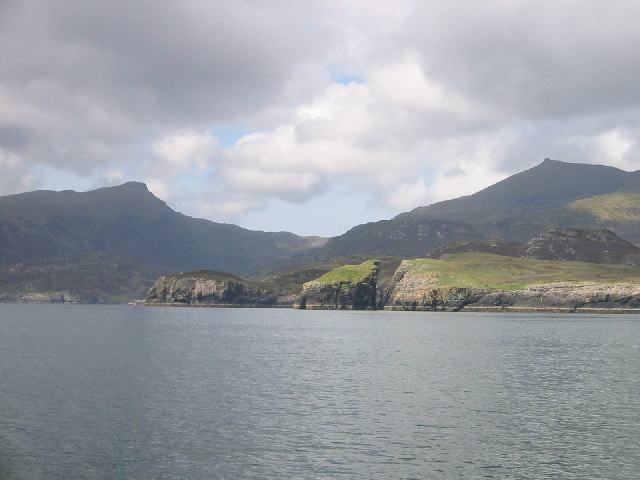
Looking west to Nicolson's Leap. In the background are Beinn Mhór on the left, and Hecla on the right.

South Uist is home to the Kildonan Museum housing the 16th century Clanranald Stone and the ruins of the house where Flora MacDonald was born.

The SEARCH project (Sheffield Environmental and Archaeological Research Campaign in the Hebrides) on South Uist has been developing a long-term perspective on changes in settlement and house form from the Bronze Age to the 19th century. Organisation within Iron Age roundhouses appears to have been very different from 19th century blackhouses in which the dwelling was shared with stock. Stock sharing living space with people is often regarded as a traditional Hebridean arrangement reflecting Norse influence.

An excavation at Bornais on the Isle of South Uist revealed what is probably the largest Viking settlement in Scotland.

The archaeological site of Cladh Hallan on South Uist is the only site in the British Isles where prehistoric mummies have been found.

=== St Kilda ===
St Kilda was continuously inhabited for two millennia or more, from the Bronze Age to the 20th century. However, little is known of the early history, the first written record of which dates from the late 14th century. The islands were historically part of the domain of the MacLeods of Harris whose steward was responsible for the collection of rents in kind and other duties. The first report of a visit to the islands dates from 1549.

Macaulay (1764) reports the existence of five druidic altars including a large circle of stones fixed perpendicularly in the ground, by the Stallir House on Boreray.

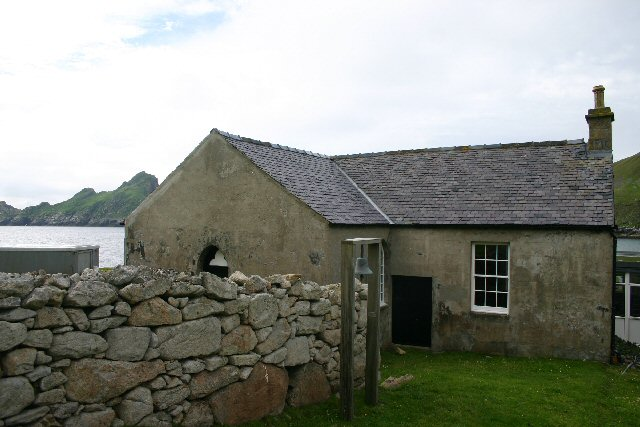
The schoolroom (on the right of the photo) was added to the side of the church in 1884.

Visiting ships in the 18th century brought cholera and smallpox and in 1727 the loss of life was so high that there were not enough men to man the boats and new families were brought in from Harris to replace them. By 1758 the population had risen to 88 and reached just under 100 by the end of the century. This figure remained fairly constant until 1851 when 36 islanders emigrated to Australia on board the Priscilla, a loss from which the island never fully recovered.

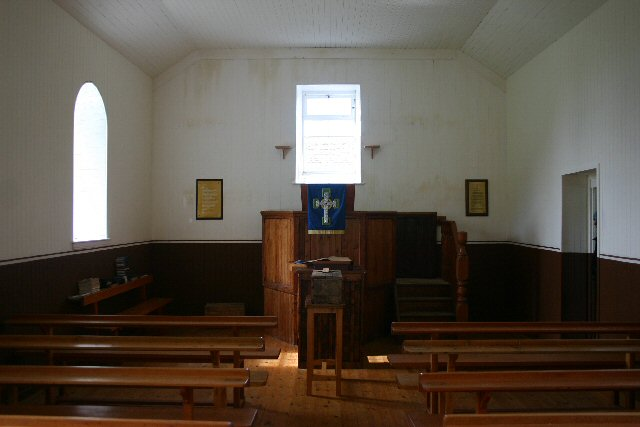
The interior of the church at Oiseabhal, St Kilda

Tourism had a destabilising impact on St Kilda. During the 19th century steamers began to visit Hirta, enabling the islanders to earn money from the sale of tweeds and birds' eggs but at the expense of their self-esteem as the tourists clearly regarded them as curiosities.

By the turn of the 20th century formal schooling had become a feature of the islands and in 1906 the church was extended to make a schoolhouse. All the children now learned English in addition to their native Gaelic. Improved midwifery skills reduced the problems of childhood tetanus. There had been some talk of an evacuation in 1875 but despite occasional food shortages and a 'flu epidemic in 1913 the population was stable at 75 to 80 people, and there was no obvious sign that within a few years the millennia-old occupation of the island was to end.

==== World War One ====
Early in World War I the Royal Navy erected a signal station on Hirta and daily communications with the mainland were established for the first time in St Kilda's history. In a belated response, a German submarine arrived in Village Bay on the morning of 15 May 1918 and after issuing a warning, started shelling the island. Seventy two shells in all were fired and the wireless station was destroyed. The manse, church, and jetty storehouse were also damaged.

As a result of this attack a Mark II QF gun was erected on a promontory overlooking Village Bay, but it was never fired in anger. Of greater long-term significance to the islanders was the introduction of regular contact with the outside world and the slow development of a money-based economy, both of which made life easier but less self-reliant. These were both factors in the evacuation of the island only a little more than a decade later.

==== Evacuation ====
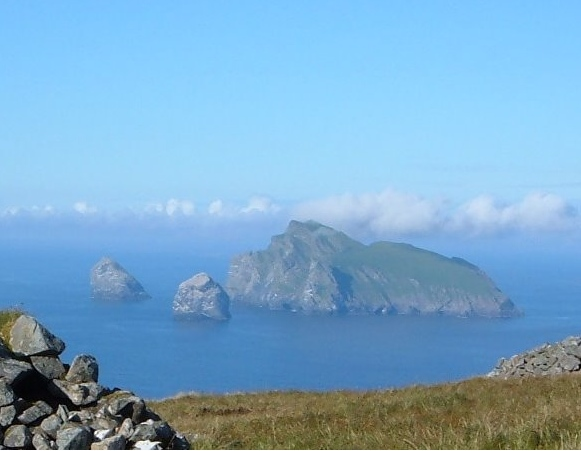
Boreray, Stac Lee, and Stac an Armin (left) from the heights of Conachair

The advent of tourism and the presence of the military in World War One had enabled the islanders to understand that there were alternatives to the privations they had routinely suffered. Despite the provision of a small jetty in 1902 the islands remained at the mercy of the weather. The authorities were unable to do much to assist them, although reliable radios and other infrastructure denied to the civilian islanders were later to be provided for the military base at a cost of millions of pounds.

After World War One most of the young men left the island and the population fell from 73 in 1920 to 37 in 1928. After the death of four men from influenza in 1926, and a succession of crop failures in the 1920s, the last straw came with the death from appendicitis of a young woman, Mary Gillies, in January 1930. On 29 August 1930, the last 36 inhabitants were evacuated to Morvern on the Scottish mainland at their own request.

==== Later military events ====
In 1955 the British government decided to incorporate St Kilda into a missile tracking range based in Benbecula, where test firings and flights are carried out. Thus in 1957 St Kilda became permanently inhabited once again. A variety of new military buildings and masts have since been erected, including the island's first licensed premises, the 'Puff Inn'. The Ministry of Defence leases St Kilda from the National Trust for Scotland for a nominal fee. The main island of Hirta is still occupied all year round by a small number of civilians working in the military base there.

== See also ==
- History of Scotland
- Hebrides
- Barra
- Benbecula
- Berneray, North Uist
- Eriskay
- Flannan Isles
- Great Bernera
- Harris
- Isle of Lewis
- North Uist
- Rockall
- Scalpay, Outer Hebrides
- South Uist
- St Kilda, Scotland
