= Sollas Airfield =

Former airfield in the Hebrides, Scotland

Sollas Airfield Sollas Airport
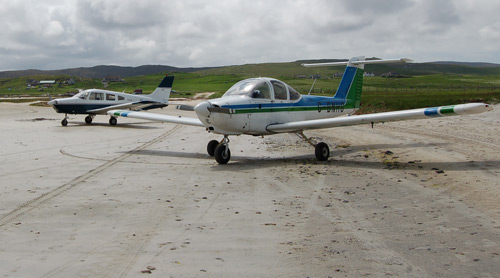
- Highland Aviation PA-28 and PA-38 at Traigh Ear beach, near Sollas, 2011
- IATA: none; ICAO: none

Summary
- Airport type: Disused
- Operator: Northern & Scottish Airways
- Location: Scottish Highlands, North Uist
- Coordinates: 57°39′51″N 007°20′07″W

Map
- Location on North Uist Location in Scotland, Sollas

Runways
Direction	Length		Surface
Direction	ft	m	Surface
S/N	N/A	N/A	Grass/sand

Sollas Airfield was an airfield on the island of North Uist in the Outer Hebrides.

The airfield was positioned to the north of Sollas township with the runway located to south of the sand dunes. The area is now agricultural land. All that could be found on the date of visit was three concrete hut bases on the north side of the A865.

== History ==
According to Iain Louis Hutchison's book on the Scottish Ambulance Service, the airfield was opened in March 1936 by the Northern & Scottish Airways. Prior to 1936 the ambulance would land either on the sands of Traigh Ear, opposite Grenitote village or on the Vallay Strand.

Hutchison writes that, by 1936 two grass runways, a hangar and a fuel depot were built by the airways when it was opened in the beach, and the Machair. Some sources say that the RAF used this airfield as an emergency airfield during WW2 until 1960, a decade after the airfield was otherwise unused.

=== Closure ===
The service continued after the Scottish Airways became British European Airways, and then retired its De Havilland Rapides in the 1950s by which time the airfield was closed.

The beach is still being used for light aircraft, and special "fly in" annual events as a memorial for John Macleod who died while running the event.
