= Na Fir Bhrèige =

Na Fir Bhreige
- Na Fir Bhrèige
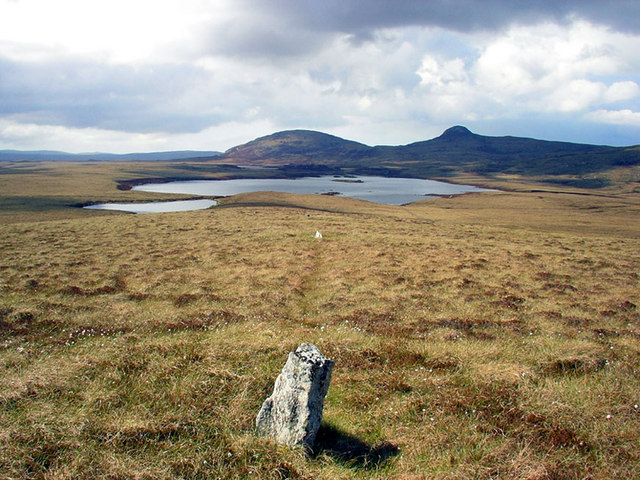

- Location within North Uist
- 57.627366°N 7.217072°W
- Periods: Neolithic
- Location: North Uist

Na Fir Bhrèige (pronounced [nə fiɾʲ ˈvɾʲeːkʲə]; can be translated from Gaelic into English as "The False Men") is a set of three standing stones on the Isle of North Uist in the Outer Hebrides. They lie on the northwestern slope of Blashaval.

The stones are set in a line that runs WNW to ESE, nearly in alignment with the peaks of Blashaval and Maari. They protrude 0.7m, 0.5m, and 0.6m above the peat, although they are probably embedded very deeply and stood much higher when originally erected. They lie 21m and 35m apart.

The name derives from two local legends. One is that they mark the graves of three traitors who were buried alive. Another is that they are three men from Skye who deserted their wives and were turned to stone by a witch.

The stones are located at grid reference NF88757176. They can be reached from the A865 about 3 miles northwest of Lochmaddy. One must then walk about a mile up Blashaval.

The stones inspired Mhairead MacLeod's novel, The False Men, based on true events during the Highland Clearances.

== See also ==
Other Neolithic sites in the Uists:

- Cladh Hallan
- Pobull Fhinn
- Barpa Langass

== Sources ==
- Beveridge, Erskine (1911). North Uist. Edinburgh: William Brown & Co. p. 262.
- Haswell-Smith, Hamish (2004). The Scottish Islands. Edinburgh: Canongate. p. 198. ISBN 978-1-84195-454-7.
- Tomes, John (1980). Blue Guide Scotland (8th ed.). London: Ernest Benn Limited. p. 399. ISBN 0-510-01625-1.
- "Na Fir Bhreige".
- "North Uist, Blashaval, Na Fir Bhreige".
