= Loch Sgadabhagh =

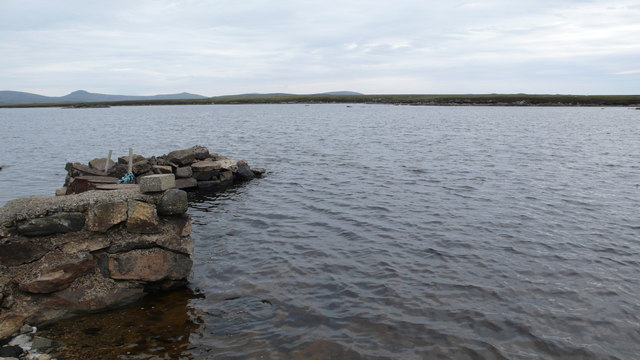
- Loch Sgadabhagh, southern portion

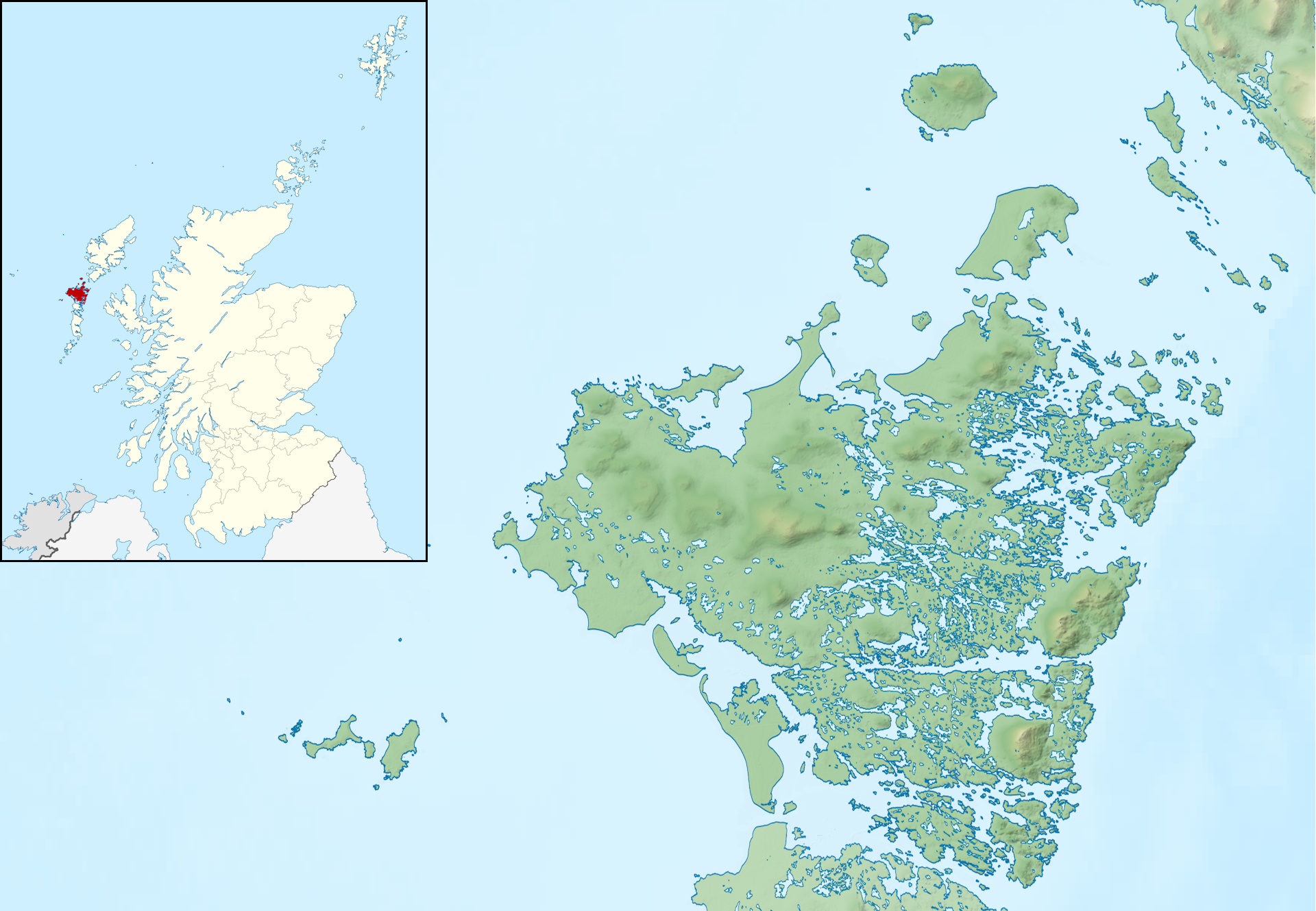
- Location within North Uist
- Location: North Uist, Eilean Siar
- Coordinates: 57°35′44″N 7°15′13″W
- Type: Freshwater loch
- Primary outflows: Garbh-Abhuinn
- Basin countries: Scotland
- Max. length: 7.25 km (4.50 mi)
- Max. width: 3 km (1.9 mi)
- Surface area: 453 ha (1,120 acres)
- Average depth: 2.75 m (9 ft 0 in)
- Max. depth: 15.1 m (50 ft)
- Water volume: 11,836,442 m^{3} (418,000,000 cu ft)
- Shore length^{1}: 80.5 km (50.0 mi)
- Surface elevation: 5 m (16 ft)
- Islands: Eilean Dubh Mòr
- Sections/sub-basins: Numerous
- Settlements: Lochmaddy
- ^{1} Shore length is not a well-defined measure.

Loch Sgadabhagh or Loch Scadavay is a body of water on the island of North Uist, Scotland. The name may be of Old Norse derivation meaning "lake of tax bay" although if so, the reason is obscure. Loch Sgadabhagh is the largest loch by area on North Uist although Loch Obisary has about twice the volume.

== Geography ==
According to Murray and Pullar (1908) "there is probably no other loch in Britain which approaches Loch Scadavay in irregularity and complexity of outline. It is an extraordinary labyrinth of narrow channels, bays, promontories and islands" The loch is crossed by the main A867 road and the northern and southern portions are "connected by such a small channel under the road that in time of flood the south loch may temporarily rise some feet higher than the other, though normally they are at the same level".

Located at NF862683, it stretches for over 7.25 kilometres (4 1/2 mi), is over three kilometres (2 mi) broad in places and has a total shore line of 80.5 kilometres (50 mi), yet the mean depth is only 2.75 metres (9 ft 0 in). The narrow channels leading into some of the elongate arms are often less than 1 metre (3 ft 3 in) in depth. The total area is 453 hectares (1,120 acres) and the maximum depths are 11.2 metres (36 ft 9 in) in the north loch and 15.1 metres (49 ft 6 in) in the south loch.

Two very short streams enter Loch Scadavay, conveying the overflow of Loch nan Eun and Loch a' Bhuird. The rivulet Garbh-Abhuinn, the most considerable stream in this part of the island, flows eastward from the north portion of the loch to Loch Garbh-Abhuinn, which drains through Loch Skealtar and Loch nan Geireann into the sea via Loch Maddy.

The shoreline is in parts of peat, stones, gravel with boulders, or rock. The easternmost arm of the south loch has precipitous rocky cliffs up to 10 metres (33 ft) high on both sides.

== Islands ==
There are numerous islands in the loch of which the largest is Eilean Dubh Mòr. Some of the islands have been the sites of dùns or crannogs and in some cases would have been connected to the shore by narrow causeways.

Once such, which lies between the promontories Rubh' a' Chlachain and Aird Smeilis, is described as a walled islet that is connected to the shore by an S-shaped causeway. According to Beveridge (1911) there is a gateway "a little east from the landing point of the causeway, which leads to a guard-chamber built against the inner side of the fort wall. Its walls range in thickness from 2 to 3 ft [60 to 90 cm], enclosing an almost rectangular area of approx 6 by 8 ft [1.8 m × 2.4 m]. Three other round or oval sheiling-type erections are scattered over the island, but near the centre is a more important building with 2 ft [60 cm] thick walls enclosing an area about 12 ft [3.7 m] diameter." There is also a semicircle of stones that forms a small harbour on the west side of the island.

The presence of these islets mean that there is no open water broader than about 0.8 kilometres (1/2 mi) anywhere on the loch. Small boulders break the surface of the shallower sections making navigation difficult.
