= Barpa Langass =

Chambered cairn in Scotland

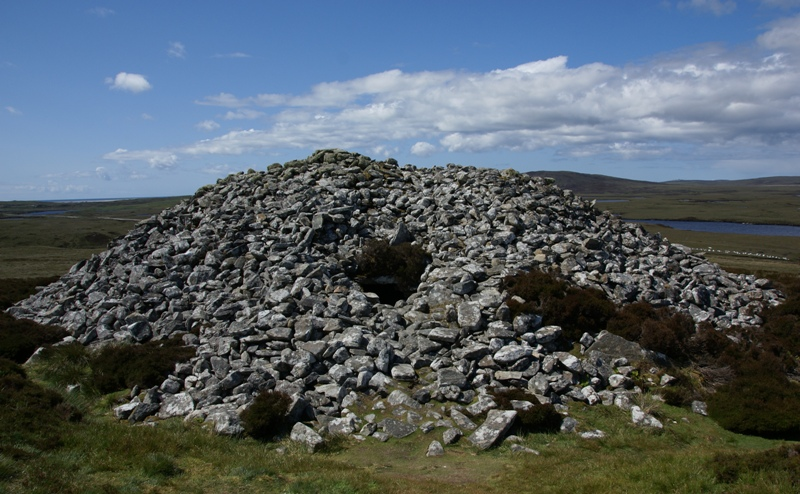
- The cairn in 2009
- Interactive map of Barpa Langass
- 57°34′14″N 7°17′29″W
- Type: Cairn
- Location: Scotland

History
- Built: c. 3000 BC

Site notes
- Material: Stone
- Height: c. 5.5 m (18 ft)
- Diameter: c. 22 m (72 ft)

Barpa Langass or Langass Barp (Scottish Gaelic: Barpa Langais [ˈpaɾpə ˈl̪ˠaŋkɪʃ]) (Note: The name means "cairn (Gaelic barpa) of Langass", referring to a nearby locality. The locality's name is of Norse origin and means "long ridge".) is a Neolithic chambered cairn on the Isle of North Uist in the Outer Hebrides of Scotland. It measures around 22 meters in diameter by 5.5 meters in height, and is around 5,000 years old. The roof is constructed of two massive slabs with a third slab superimposed.

The entrance is at the east side. Although the structure has partially collapsed, it is still possible to enter one chamber. The antiquary Erskine Beveridge believed that a second and perhaps a third chamber exist. In or prior to 1911, Dr Beveridge excavated within and near the cairn, and he found evidence of burnt burials as well as pieces of pottery (some with patterned lines), wood ashes, burnt bones, a flint arrowhead, a scraper, and a piece of pierced talc.

Barpa Langass can be reached via footpath from the A867 about 5 miles southwest of Lochmaddy. Alternatively, one can park at the Langass Lodge Hotel, follow the footpath to the Pobull Fhinn stone circle, and then continue up Ben Langass to Barpa Langass.

== See also ==
- Cladh Hallan – a Bronze Age site on South Uist

== Sources ==
- Beveridge, Erskine (1911). North Uist. Edinburgh: William Brown & Co. pp. 246–48.
- Tomes, John (1980). Blue Guide Scotland (8th ed.). London: Ernest Benn Limited. p. 399. ISBN 0-510-01626-X.
- "North Uist, Barpa Langass". Archived from the original on 6 August 2012.
