= Dun an Sticir =

Iron Age broch in the Scottish Outer Hebrides

- Dun an Sticer; Dun an Sticar
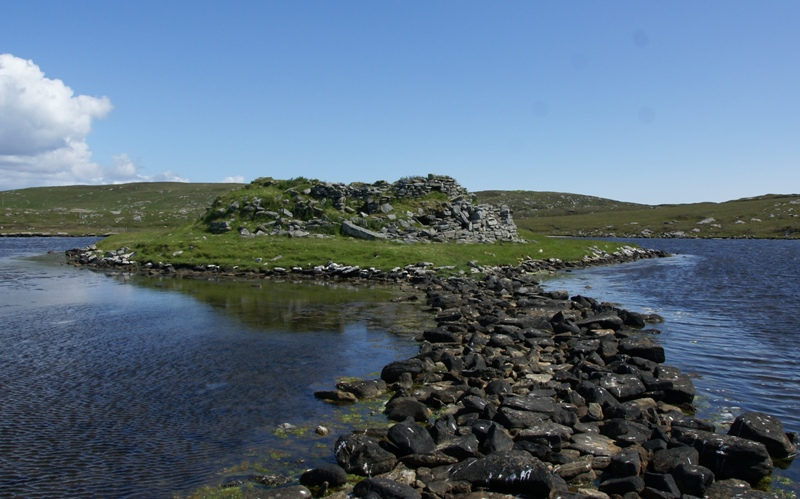
- Dun an Sticir

- Location within North Uist
- 57°40′53.43″N 7°12′27.99″W
- Type: Broch
- Periods: Iron Age
- Location: North Uist

Site notes
- Public access: Yes

Dun an Sticir (Scottish Gaelic: Dùn an Sticir [ˈt̪un əɲ ˈʃtʲiçkʲɪɾʲ]) is an Iron Age broch situated approximately 9.5 kilometers north of Lochmaddy in a loch on North Uist in the Scottish Outer Hebrides. A building was erected on the site in the late medieval period.

== Name and location ==
Dun an Sticir (grid reference NF89717767) is located on a small island in Loch an Sticir on the east side of the B893 road, 0.8 kilometers south of Newtonferry. The name is also misspelled Dun an Sticer and Dun an Sticar. The island, on which the broch stands, is connected by a causeway to another larger island called Eilean na Mi-Chomhairle (Island of Bad Council). This larger island is connected via two causeways to the mainland. Dun an Sticir is freely accessible. At high tide, the causeways may be partially submerged.

The name Dun an Sticir is derived from "dun", which means "fortress", and "sticir" which means "skulker". Thus Dun an Sticir means Fort Skulker. Only in the second half of the twentieth century did it become clear that the structure was a broch.

== History ==
Dun an Sticir was probably built in the Iron Age in the period between 100 BC and 100 AD, like most brochs. Limited excavations resulted in finds of pottery.

The broch was probably inhabited during the Viking period. In the Middle Ages the broch was converted into a rectangular hall, or small tower. The entrance was enlarged and a window was constructed. Outbuildings were added and there was a larger building on Eilean na Mi-Chomhairle. The causeway from the north side of the loch to Eilean na Mi-Chomhairle was widened to 3 meters, so that carts could get to the island.

Hugh MacDonald of Sleat (Scottish Gaelic: Ùisdean MacGilleEasbuig Chlèirich), son of Hugh the Clerk, inhabited Dun Sticir in 1602. He was the Factor to North Uist in the 1580s. In 1586 he hatched a plan to murder his cousin, Donald Gorm, 8th Chief of the Macdonalds of Sleat. After his plan was discovered, he fled to Dun an Sticir. He was eventually captured when he tried to escape a siege of his castle, Caisteal Uisdean, on Skye. As punishment, he was starved to death in the dungeon of Duntulm Castle on Skye.

== Construction ==
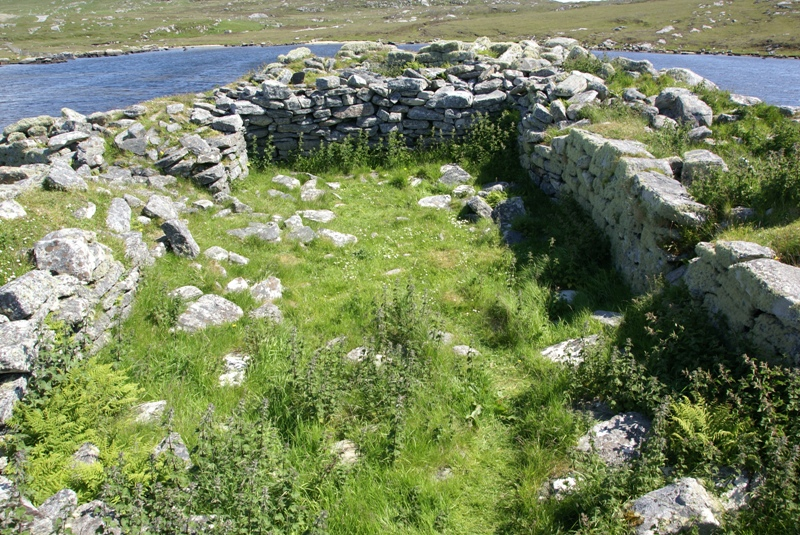
Medieval building within Dun an Sticir

Dun an Sticir is located on an island in a loch. A wide stone causeway leads from the north to the island of Eilean na Mi-Chomhairle. A second, smaller causeway leads from the south side of the lake to the same island. A third causeway curves from that island to the east to the small island on which the broch lies. The causeways are partially submerged at high tide.

The broch has a total diameter of 18 metres. The walls of the broch are 3.5 metres thick and in some places a little more than three metres high.

The circular interior of the broch was in the Middle Ages transformed into a rectangular area 10 metres by 4.6 metres. The axis is northeast–southwest. The entrances are 1.1 metres wide, located in the northwest and southwest of the rectangular space. The wall at the southwestern entrance is 2.5 metres thick.
