= Hougharry =

Coordinates: 57.608°N 7.516°W

Hougharry: Scottish Gaelic: Hogha Gearraidh
- Hougharry in the 1970s

- Location within the Outer Hebrides Hougharry (Outer Hebrides)
- Language: Scottish Gaelic; English
- OS grid reference: NG707711
- Civil parish: North Uist
- Council area: Na h-Eileanan Siar
- Lieutenancy area: Western Isles
- Country: Scotland
- Sovereign state: United Kingdom
- Post town: ISLE OF NORTH UIST
- Postcode district: HS6
- Dialling code: 01876
- Police: Scotland
- Fire: Scottish
- Ambulance: Scottish
- UK Parliament: Na h-Eileanan an Iar
- Scottish Parliament: Na h-Eileanan an Iar

Hougharry (Scottish Gaelic: Hogha Gearraidh) is a township (crofting settlement) on North Uist in the Outer Hebrides. The settlement is recorded on Ordnance Survey mapping since 1876 and on other maps since 1799. It is situated just north of Balranald Nature Reserve and about 1.5 kilometres (0.93 miles) east of Aird an Rùnair. It is the closest permanently inhabited settlement to Rockall (369 kilometres to the west). The township contains a smithy and well. Three whalebone objects and prehistoric potsherds were found around 1986 while walking on the beach. A church (Kilmuir church) is mentioned in 1392, indicated now by the Balranald tomb, dated 1768, in the centre of a once circular graveyard, enlarged in 1900. The site is likely to be archaeologically significant.
