= Siol Murdoch =

Ancient Scottish clan

Profile
- Region: Outer Hebrides
- District: North Uist
- Siol Murdoch no longer has a chief, and is an armigerous clan

The Siol Murdoch were an ancient Scottish family and a sept of the Clan Donald or MacDonald, a Scottish clan of the Scottish Highlands. Siol Murdoch in Scottish Gaelic means seed of Murdoch with the full Gaelic being Siol Mhurchaidh and may also be known by the Anglicised Gaelic surname of MacMurchie. They inhabited North Uist.

== History ==
The Siol Murdoch are noted for their feud during the 14th and 15th centuries with the Siol Gorrie (surname MacGorrie) who were another sept of the Clan Donald. The Siol Gorrie were apparently the legitimate possessors of North Uist but this was disputed by the Siol Murdoch and a struggle began between the two factions. The Siol Murdoch inhabited the valley of Hosta and the Siol Gorrie apparently dug away the soil embankment of a nearby loch, which in turn formed a new loch, the present Loch Hosta, and in the resulting deluge many people of Siol Murdoch were killed. The survivors however attacked the Siol Gorrie near the township of Udal and there was only one survivor who found refuge in Lochboisdale.

According to tradition there are those in Uist who pride themselves as being descended from the legitimate and honourable Siol Gorrie and not from the deceitful and illegitimate Siol Murdoch.

A short Gaelic verse about the Siol Murdoch is as follows:

Gu traigh! gu traigh! Siolach a Mhurachaidh, Gu traigh! gu traigh! Siolach a Mhurachaidh, Gu traigh! gu traigh! Siolach a Mhurachaidh, Siol dugh nan car ! Siol dugh nan car ! Siol dugh nan car ! Siol nan cuilichiann or cuiligionn.

This translates in English as:

To the strand! to the strand! ye seedlings of Murdoch, To the strand! to the strand! ye seedlings of Murdoch, To the strand! to the strand! ye seedlings of Murdoch, The black-hearted seedlings! The black-hearted seedlings! The black-hearted seedlings! The seedlings of Murdoch.

Angus MacDonald who was a member of the Siol Murdoch family (Sio Mhurchaidh in Gaelic) from North Uist was named as the last piper of the Great Highland bagpipes who could play the Lament for the Laird of Valley all the way through. This Angus MacDonald was a veteran of the Napoleonic Wars.
