= Newtonferry =

Coordinates: 57.687°N 7.212°W

Newtonferry: Scottish Gaelic: Port nan Long
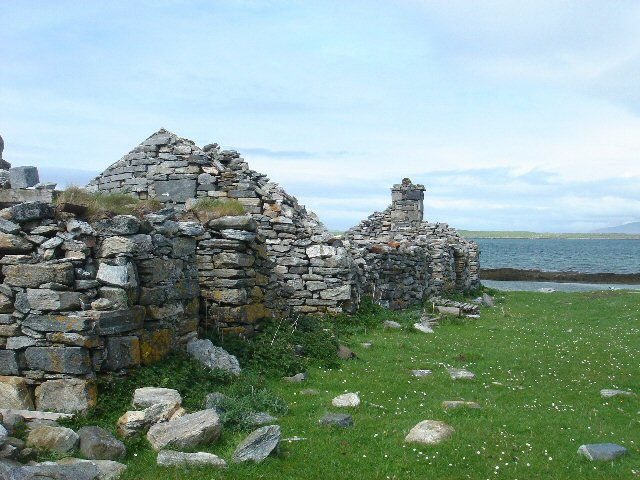
- Old steadings at Port nan Long

- Location within the Outer Hebrides
- Language: Scottish Gaelic; English
- OS grid reference: NF894782
- Civil parish: North Uist
- Council area: Na h-Eileanan Siar
- Lieutenancy area: Western Isles
- Country: Scotland
- Sovereign state: United Kingdom
- Post town: ISLE OF NORTH UIST
- Postcode district: HS6
- Dialling code: 01876
- Police: Scotland
- Fire: Scottish
- Ambulance: Scottish
- UK Parliament: Na h-Eileanan an Iar
- Scottish Parliament: Na h-Eileanan an Iar

Newtonferry (Scottish Gaelic: Port nan Long, "the harbour of the ships") is a small crofting community on the island of North Uist in the Western Isles of Scotland, at the end of the B893 road. Newtonferry is within the parish of North Uist.

A number of archaeological sites have been discovered in the vicinity.

A ferry used to run between Newtonferry and the neighboring island of Berneray, but no longer runs since a permanent causeway was constructed between Berneray and North Uist.

== See also ==
- Dun an Sticir
