= Vallay =

Uninhabited tidal island in the Scottish Outer Hebrides

Bhàlaigh (Gaelic)

Location
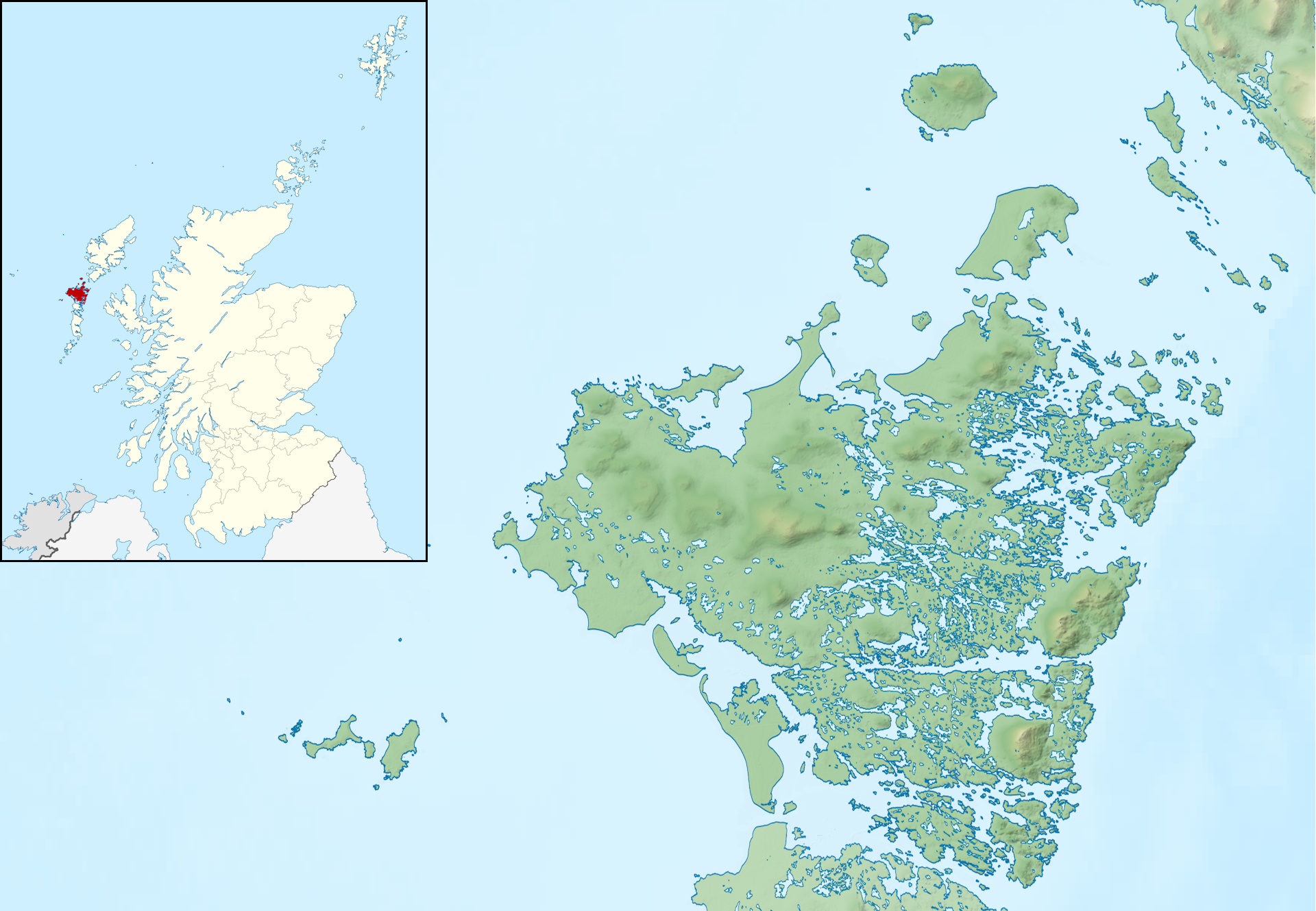
- Vallay shown next to North Uist Vallay shown within the Outer Hebrides
- OS grid reference: NF769763
- Coordinates: 57.660690°N 7.419152°W

Name
- Name meaning: hill island

Physical geography
- Island group: Outer Hebrides
- Area: 260 hectares (1.00 sq mi)
- Area rank: 94
- Highest elevation: 38 metres (125 ft)

Administration
- Council area: Comhairle nan Eilean Siar
- Country: Scotland
- Sovereign state: United Kingdom

Demographics
- Population: 0

Vallay (Scottish Gaelic: Bhàlaigh) is an uninhabited tidal island in the Scottish Outer Hebrides. It can be reached from North Uist by a long beach at low tide.

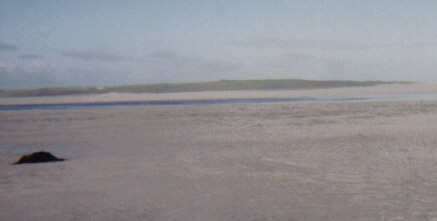
Southeast coast of Vallay seen from Solas.

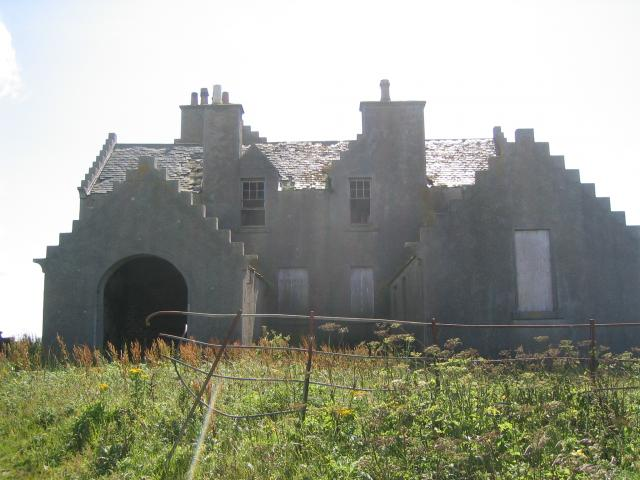
The abandoned mansion of Erskine Beveridge in July 2004

Once the island supported a population of nearly sixty people. Its best-known inhabitant was the archaeologist Erskine Beveridge. The island is also known for its sea birds and for prehistoric monuments.
