= Sollas =

Coordinates: 57.650°N 7.345°W

Sollas: Scottish Gaelic: Solas
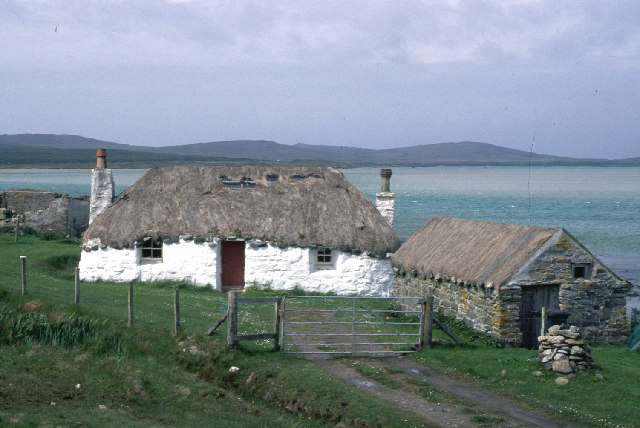
- Struan cottage. A traditional thatched cottage in Sollas, seen in 2002 and since restored.

- Location within the Outer Hebrides
- Language: Scottish Gaelic; English
- OS grid reference: NF812747
- Civil parish: North Uist
- Council area: Na h-Eileanan Siar
- Lieutenancy area: Western Isles
- Country: Scotland
- Sovereign state: United Kingdom
- Post town: ISLE OF NORTH UIST
- Postcode district: HS6
- Dialling code: 01876
- Police: Scotland
- Fire: Scottish
- Ambulance: Scottish
- UK Parliament: Na h-Eileanan an Iar
- Scottish Parliament: Na h-Eileanan an Iar

Sollas (Scottish Gaelic: Solas) is a small crofting township on the northern coast of the island of North Uist, Scotland.

== History ==
=== The Battle of Sollas ===
From Sollas, the road that heads towards Bayhead is known as the Committee Road. It is called this as it was organised by a committee charged with providing relief to the Highland Potato Famine in the 1840s. The Battle of Sollas took place in 1849 during the time of the Highland Clearances.

In 1849, Lord Macdonald decided to evict between 600 and 700 people from Sollas. At the time the people were suffering from several years of potato famine. The notices of ejection were served on the tenants on 15 May 1849. They asked for a delay in order to use their cattle and other effects to their best advantage, but were given no answer. Many of them were soon turned out of their houses and their property seized. It was now the month of July and far too late for them to set out for Canada as the cold winter would be setting in when they arrived, with no means to provide against it and therefore they rebelled. As a result the principal Sheriff-Substitute by the surname of Colqhoun along with his officers and a strong body of police left Inverness and headed for Sollas on North Uist to eject the tenants from their homes. As the tenant's homes were demolished they began to throw stones at the men carrying out this work who were then driven from the houses and had to retire behind the police for shelter. Volleys of stones and other missiles followed. The police then charged at them in two divisions and there were some cuts and bruises on both sides, but the demolition work then went on uninterrupted. Among the incidents of eviction mentioned by historian Alexander Mackenzie was that of an old woman who attacked an officer with her stick, knocking off his hat, but she was then carried out by two police officers. Four of the men were later charged with deforcing the officers and were each sentenced to four months imprisonment at the Inverness Court of Justiciary. The following year the whole district was completely cleared of the remaining inhabitants.

The Battle of Sollas is featured in the novel The False Men by Mhairead MacLeod.

== Local amenities ==
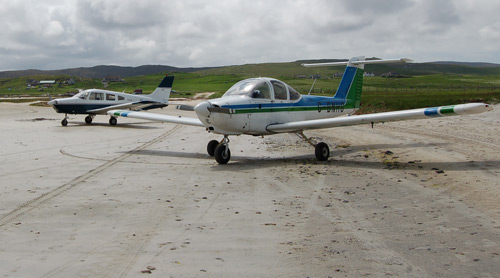
Highland Aviation aircraft at Tràigh Ear, Sollas, in 2011

Today, the village of Sollas has a local supermarket and the old school building has been turned into a community centre - Taigh Sgire Sholais. Every July, the residents of Sollas host a series of events known as Sollas Week. Sollas is situated in the parish of North Uist, and the people are almost entirely Protestant.

== In popular culture ==
- The False Men by Mhairead MacLeod, author. The novel is set in North Uist during the era of the Highland Clearances when all residents of the townships around Sollas were forcibly evicted resulting in the Battle of Sollas.
- Sollas beach is featured in the novel The Chessmen by Peter May.

== Airfield ==
Northern & Scottish Airways inaugurated services to Sollas in February 1936, using beach and the machair (on which it laid out two grass runways, a hangar and a fuel depot). Services continued until British European Airways retired its De Havilland Rapides in the 1950s. The beach at Tràigh Ear continues to be used infrequently by light aircraft. Highland Aviation uses the beach for its beach landing training course, along with Traigh Mhòr beach at Barra (the site of Barra Airport).
