= Pauline Prior-Pitt =

British poet

Pauline Prior-Pitt is a British poet who lives in North Uist, Scotland. She lives in Grenitote in North Uist, an island in the Outer Hebrides off the west coast of Scotland. In addition to several books of poetry, Prior-Pitt has also written the pamphlet North Uist Sea Poems; the poems are bound together in a pamphlet, designed and handmade by the poet.

== Publications ==
Prior-Pitt has written several books of poetry, including:

- Waiting Women (1989).
- In the Heat of the Moment (1991).
- Still Standing in the Plant Pot (1994).
- Addresses & Dreams (1997).
- Storm Biscuits (2001).
- Ironing with Sue Lawley (2005).
