= Siol Gorrie =

Profile
- Region: Outer Hebrides
- District: North Uist
- Siol Gorrie no longer has a chief, and is an armigerous clan

Siol Gorrie (Siolach Ghoirridh) is a Scottish Clan and a branch of Clan Donald. The progenitor of Siol Gorrie is Gorrie (Godfrey), a son of John of Islay and Amy of Garmoran.

Godfrey was titled Lord of Uist. The Siol Gorrie feuded with their cousins Clan Ranald and Siol Murdoch, which almost led to Siol Gorrie's extinction after three generations. Alister MacGorrie, son of Godfrey was executed at Inverness by King James I of Scotland in 1427. The lands of the clan were given by John of Islay, Earl of Ross to Hugh MacDonald, Lord of Sleat in 1495, however Clan Ranald disputed and fought against this charter.

== Castles ==
- Castle Elantirrim (Castle Tioram)
