= Tigharry =

Coordinates: 57.617°N 7.504°W

Tigharry: Scottish Gaelic: Taigh a' Ghearraidh
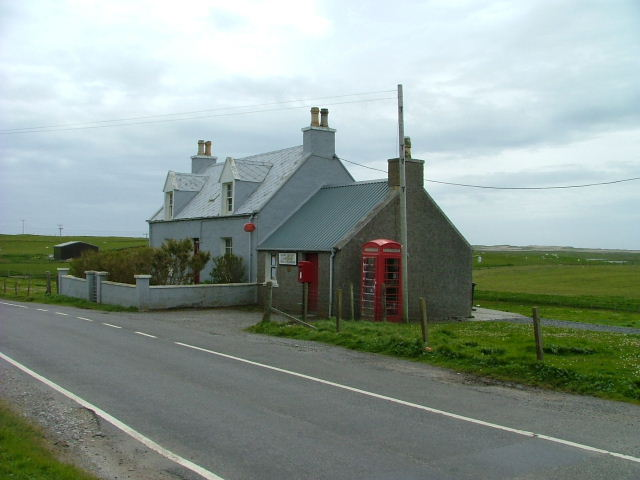
- Tigharry Post Office

- Location within the Outer Hebrides
- Language: Scottish Gaelic; English
- OS grid reference: NF714718
- Civil parish: North Uist
- Council area: Na h-Eileanan Siar
- Lieutenancy area: Western Isles
- Country: Scotland
- Sovereign state: United Kingdom
- Post town: NORTH UIST
- Postcode district: HS6
- Dialling code: 01876
- Police: Scotland
- Fire: Scottish
- Ambulance: Scottish
- UK Parliament: Na h-Eileanan an Iar
- Scottish Parliament: Na h-Eileanan an Iar

Tigharry (Scottish Gaelic: Taigh a' Ghearraidh) is a small village on the west of North Uist. It is mostly a farming community. There are a few rocky beaches and one point of interest is Kettle's Cave. Tigharry is within the parish of North Uist and used to have its own chapel, known as St. Clement's and dating from prior to 1654. The settlement contains the remains of a fort where potsherds were found, which was once an island with a causeway.
