= Scolpaig =

Coordinates: 57.6489°N 7.4850°W

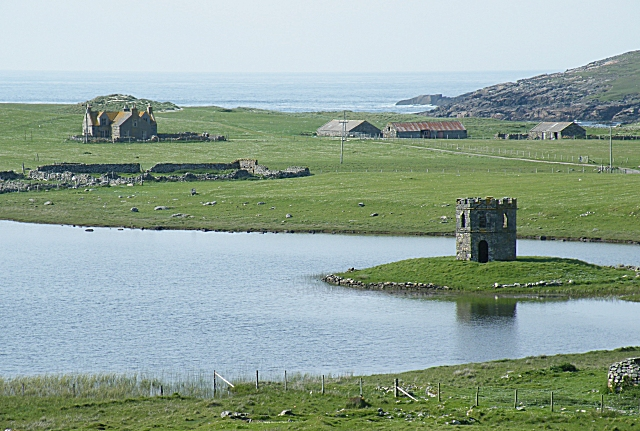
Scolpaig Farm and Scolpaig tower

Scolpaig (Scottish Gaelic: Sgolpaig) is a district on the north-west coast of the island of North Uist in the Outer Hebrides of Scotland.

In 2018 it was unsuccessfully proposed as the site of a spaceport backed by the Scottish government. In 2019 it was again proposed as the site of a spaceport. Construction work started in 2024.

Scolpaig Tower is a folly that was erected at Loch Scolpaig as part of famine relief works in about 1830.

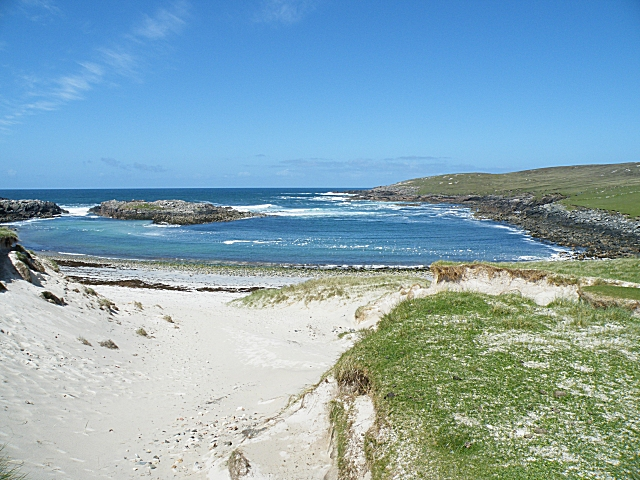
Bàgh Sgolpaig

== Coastline ==
Lewisian Gneiss rock formations at Scolpaig are unique on the Atlantic coast of Uist, which is predominantly machair and sandy beaches. Striking rock formations, sheer cliff faces and breeding cormorant and black guillemot colonies are to be seen along the coast at Scolpaig.

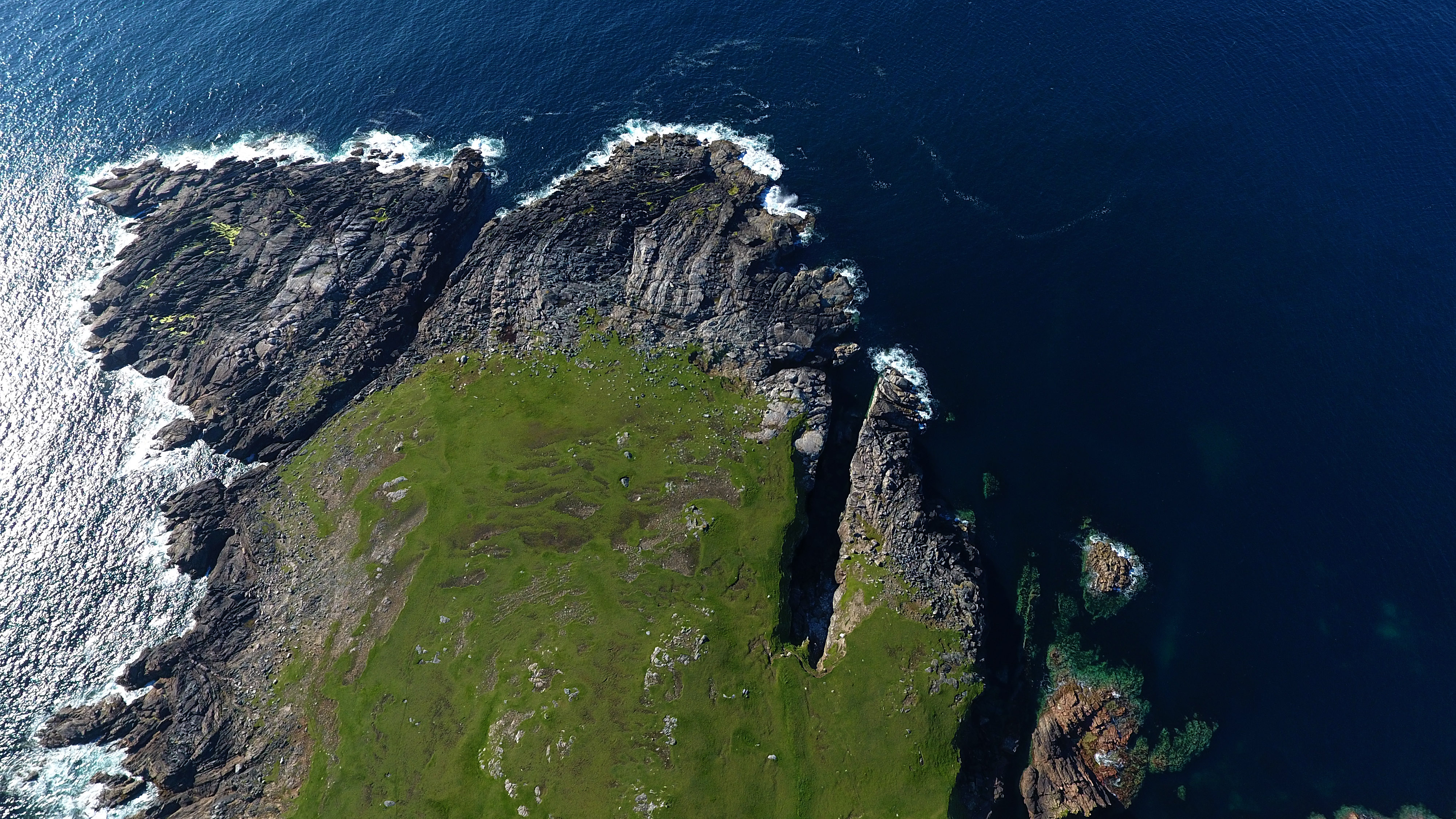
Lewisian Gneiss on the Atlantic coast of North Uist at Sloc Rubha, Scolpaig

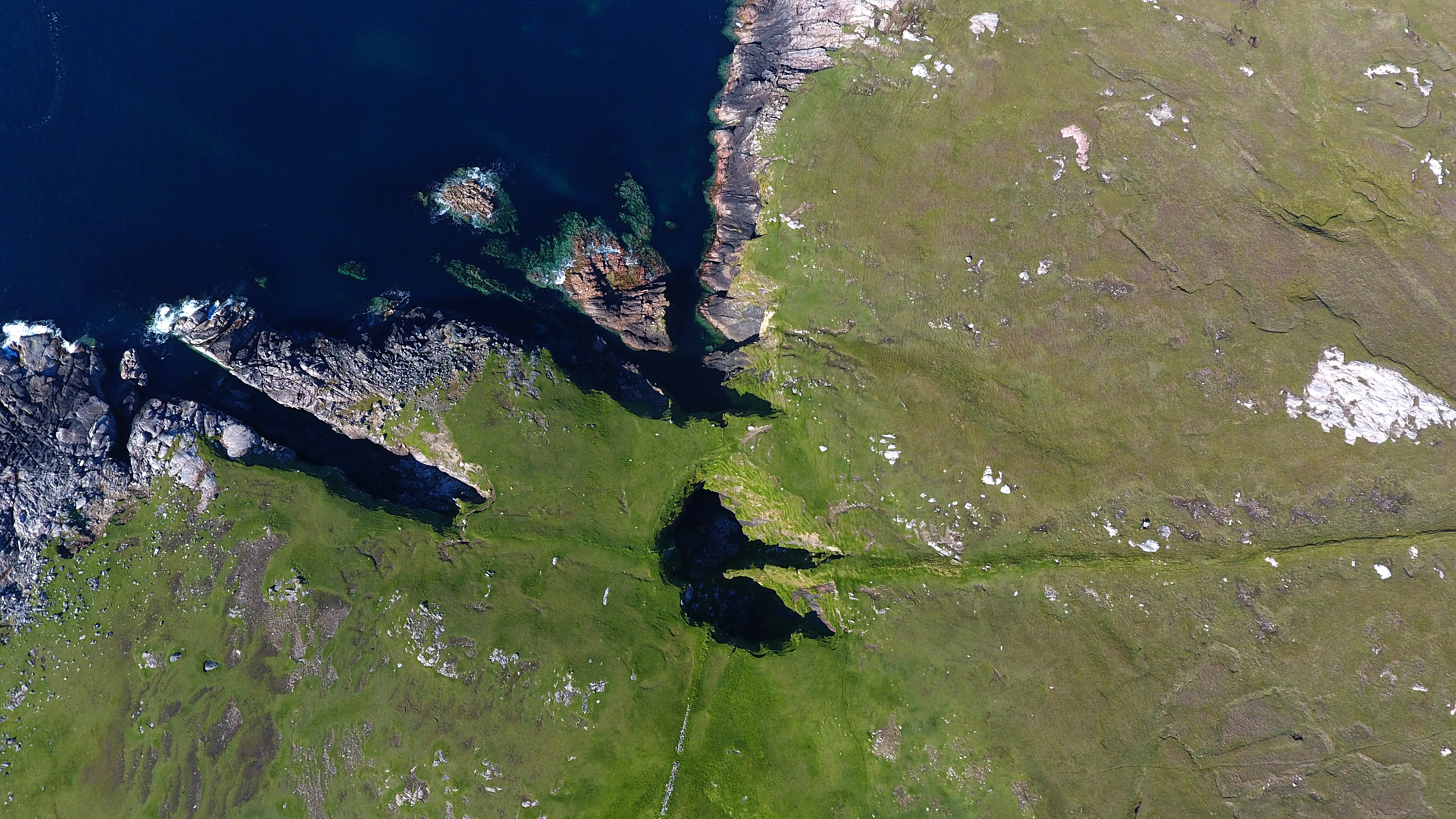
Partially collapsed sea cave in Lewisian Gneiss at Sloc Rubha, Scolpaig

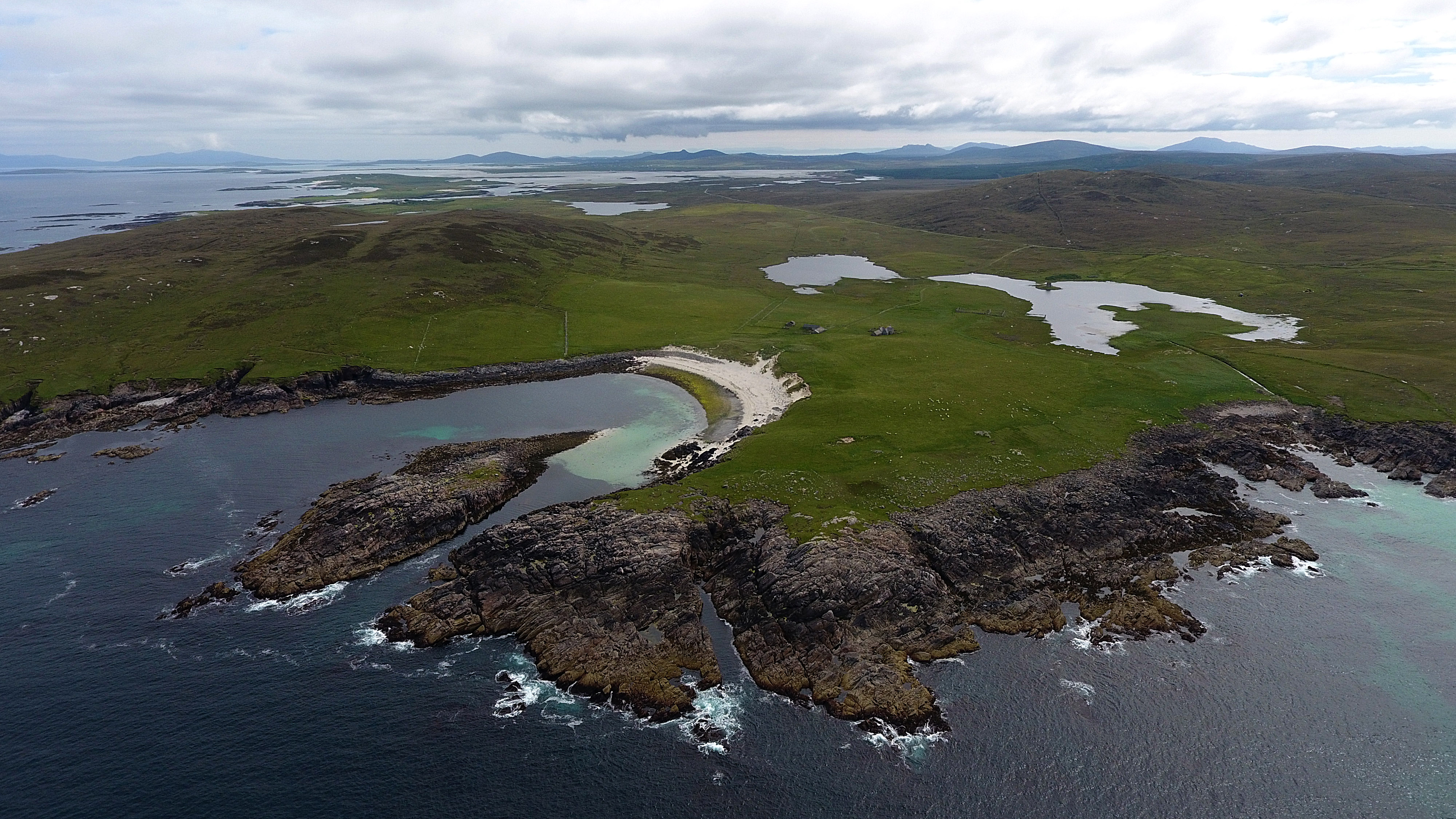
Scolpaig Bay, Loch Scolpaig and Beinn Scolpaig, North Uist

== Spaceport ==
A spaceport is being constructed at Scolpaig despite objections from the local community and the Royal Society for the Protection of Birds. In 2019 Comhairle nan Eilean Siar (the local council) agreed to invest £1m to purchase land at Scolpaig for the construction of a launch facility, in a consortium with Highlands and Islands Enterprise, the UK technology company QinetiQ and the consultancy Commercial Space Technologies (CST). Rockets would be launched vertically to carry payloads of up to 500 kg into Sun synchronous and polar orbits.
