= Scolpaig Tower =

Coordinates: 57°38′45.8″N 7°28′53.35″W

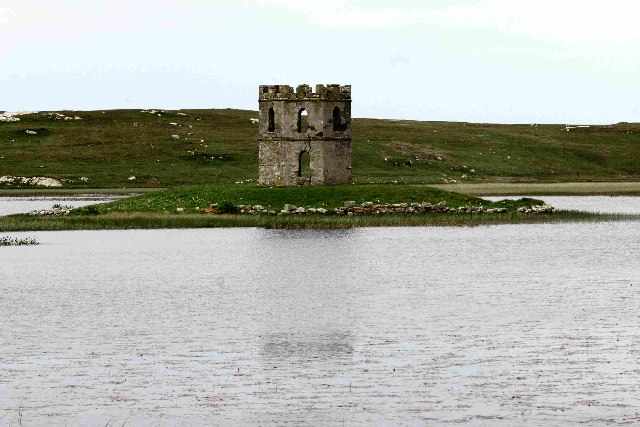
Scolpaig Tower as seen across Loch Scolpaig

Scolpaig Tower (also known as Dùn Scolpaig or MacLeod’s Folly) is a Georgian folly located near the village of Scolpaig on the island of North Uist in the Outer Hebrides. The name probably derives from the Old Norse scolpvik, or 'Scolp Bay' (a scolp being a large Hebridean vessel, probably relating to the nearby bay where such boats may have landed).

It was built in about 1830 by Dr Alexander MacLeod, who was the factor of the North Uist estate. It was erected to provide employment for the purpose of famine relief. Built over an Iron Age dun on a small islet in Loch Scolpaig, the Gothic-style folly has an octagonal footprint and appears as a two-storey structure surmounted by a crenellated parapet. The tower is surrounded by a low stone wall that was probably constructed at the same time. The original dun has disappeared entirely. Today the tower is open to the elements and serves as a nesting place for birds.

It was included in the Ninth Report and Inventory of Monuments and Constructions in the Outer Hebrides, Skye and the Small Isles (1928) of the Royal Commission on the Ancient and Historical Monuments of Scotland. In Historic Scotland approved it as a Category B listed building in 1971, however this was withdrawn in 2018 as part of the Dual Designation 2A project though the site continues to be protected as part of a scheduled monument.

Scolpaig Tower is located at OS Grid Reference NF73107503. When the water level is sufficiently low, it can be reached via a stone causeway in Loch Scolpaig. The tower is a prominent feature on otherwise flat ground and is among the most photographed sites on the island.

A group organised by the Council for Scottish Archaeology under its Adopt-a-Monument scheme was in 2008 attempting to raise funds to stabilise and conserve the structure.
