= Pobull Fhinn =

Ring of standing stones, N. Uist, Outer Hebrides

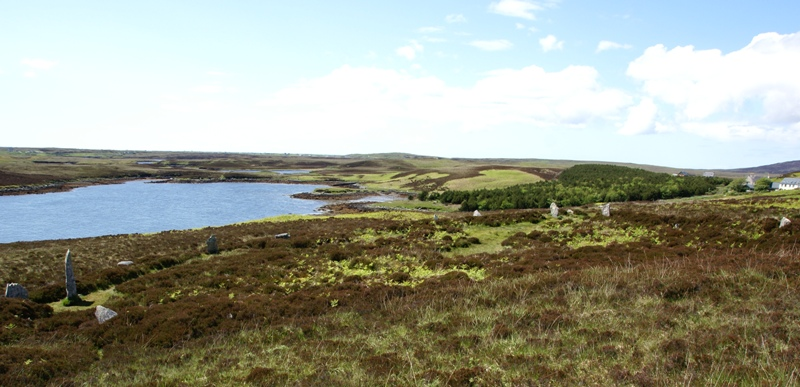
Pobull Fhinn from the north with in the background Loch Langass.

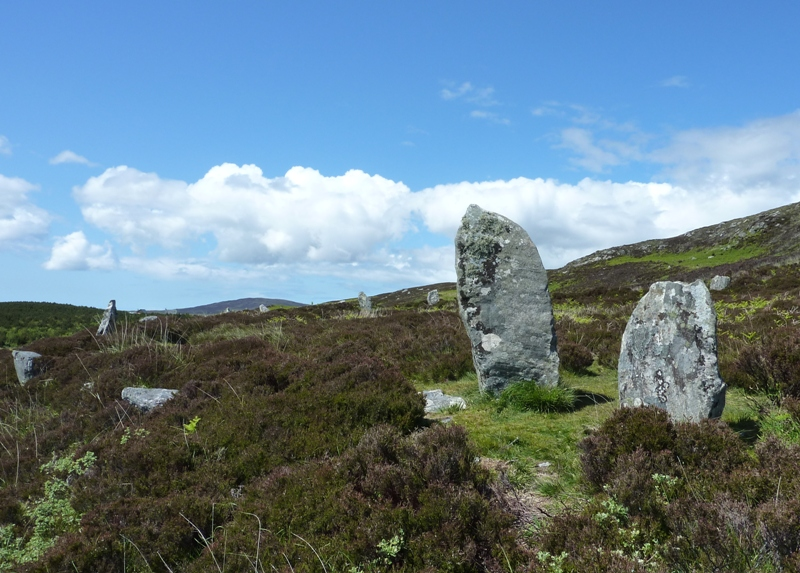
Pobull Fhinn from the east. The second stone on the right is the highest one with a height of two meters.

Pobull Fhinn (Scottish Gaelic: Poball Fhinn [ˈpʰɔpəl̪ˠ ˈiːɲ]) is a stone circle on the Isle of North Uist in the Outer Hebrides. The name is Gaelic. The first word has been variously spelt as pobull, poball, pobul or as plural pobuill. The phrase can be translated as "Fionn's people", "the white/fair people", or "Finn's tent". The plural form Pobuill Fhinn can be translated as "Fionn's peoples" and is unlikely to be correct.

The stones were probably named after the legendary Gaelic hero Fionn mac Cumhaill known in English as Finn or Fingal. The present title may constitute a modern rationalisation of a word now obsolete in colloquial Scottish Gaelic: Pùball Fhinn ("Fionn's tent") was a common phrase in the ancient Fenian cycle of Gaelic lore and indicated his nomadic residence.

The stones are also known as Sòrnach Coir' Fhinn, or "the fireplace of Fionn's cauldron" and locally as Sòrnach a' Phobaill ("the fireplace of the People"). The former name is similar to that of Sòrnaichean Coir' Fhinn ("the fireplaces of Fionn's cauldron") near Kensaleyre in Skye and Suidhe Coire Fhionn ("the site of Fionn's cauldron") in Arran. Coire Fhinn ("Fionn's cauldron") was used to cook the deer that he and his fellow hunters had killed.

Of the several stone circles on the island, Pobull Fhinn is the most conspicuous. It is located on the south side of Ben Langass, and it possibly dates from the second millennium BC. It is technically an oval rather than a circle, measuring about 120 feet (37 metres) from east to west and 93 ft (28 m) from north to south. Although situated on a natural plateau, the north side of the enclosed area has been excavated to about 4 ft (1.2 m). At least two dozen stones can be counted, some eight on the northern half and 16 on the southern half, but parts of the circle are devoid of stones. About 4 ft (1.2 m) within the circle at the east side is a tall single stone, and there are two fallen slabs about 7 ft (2.1 m) beyond the western edge.

Pobull Fhinn is located at grid reference NF 8427 6502 57°33′52″N 7°16′57″W. It can be reached from a footpath beginning near the Langass Lodge Hotel. Alternatively, it can be reached from the footpath to Barpa Langass that starts from the A867 about five miles (eight kilometres) southwest of Lochmaddy; Barpa Langass is a 3/4-mile (1.2-kilometre) walk up Ben Langass from Pobull Fhinn. The jagged shapes of the stones silhouetted against Loch Langass, Loch Eport, and Eaval make Pobull Fhinn one of the most visited and most photographed sites on North Uist.

== Sources ==
- Beveridge, Erskine (1911). North Uist. Edinburgh: William Brown & Co. pp. 259–60.
- Thom, A. (1967). Megalithic Sites in Britain. Oxford: Clarendon Press. pp. 131–33.
