= Balranald Nature Reserve =

Nature reserve in the Outer Hebrides, Scotland

Coordinates: 57.609164°N 7.502957°W

The Balranald Nature Reserve is an RSPB reserve on the north west coast of North Uist, Outer Hebrides, Scotland.

The reserve is open all year round and has a small unmanned visitor centre

Balranald has a number of birds that can be viewed there regularly, such as lapwings, corn buntings, greylag geese and the famous corncrake, which makes a distinctive rasping sound in the summer months. 29 singing male corncrakes were reported by the Royal Society for the Protection of Birds in its 2025 Wildlife on Reserves report.

North Uist has also had some other rarer visitors such as the Snowy Owl, Black Billed Cuckoo, Gyrfalcon and the Hoopoe.

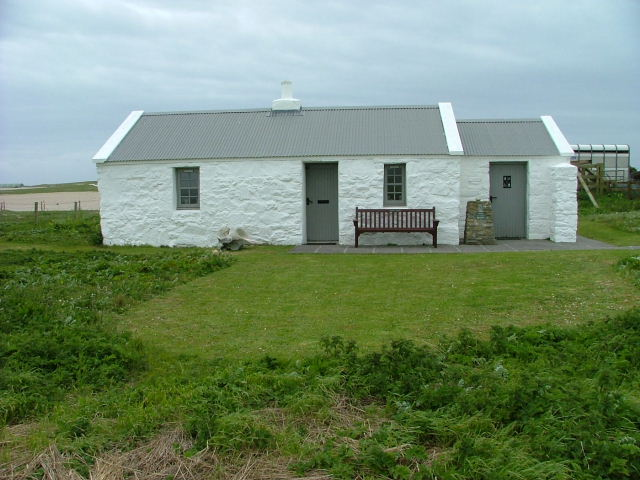
Balranald Visitor Centre
