= Erskine Beveridge =

Erskine Beveridge FRSE FSAScot (27 December 1851 – 10 August 1920) was a Scottish textile manufacturer, historian and antiquary. He was the owner of Erskine Beveridge & Co. Ltd., which had been founded by his father in 1832 and was the largest linen manufacturer in Dunfermline, Fife. He travelled extensively in Scotland, taking numerous photographs and publishing several scholarly books on Scottish history and archaeology.

== Life ==
He was born in Dunfermline, the eldest of four children of Erskine Beveridge (1803–1864) and his second wife, Maria Elizabeth Wilson (1816–1873). He was educated at the Free Abbey School in Dunfermline, the Edinburgh Institution, and the University of Edinburgh. His father died when the younger Erskine was twelve years old, and in 1874 the family firm passed from the management of a trustee to the joint control of Erskine junior, a brother, and a half-brother. By 1888, Erskine junior was in full control of the business following his half-brother's death and his brother's withdrawal.

The company grew rapidly with the robust world demand for high-quality linens. Notably, Beveridge tapped the large North American market and eventually opened a New York warehouse. By 1903, Erskine Beveridge & Co. Ltd. was a world leader in fine linen and had three branch factories in addition to its primary works in Dunfermline.

Notwithstanding his dedication to and success in business, Beveridge was devoted to Scottish antiquarian studies. His first published book was a compilation of grave inscriptions called The Churchyard Memorials of Crail (1893), and he published two further works about his native Fife: A Bibliography of Dunfermline and the West of Fife (1901) and The Burgh Records of Dunfermline, 1485–1584 (1917).

Perhaps his greatest antiquarian contribution was to the archaeological study of the Hebrides. He published Coll and Tiree: Their Prehistoric Forts and Ecclesiastical Antiquities in 1903. He owned a large house (now a ruin 57°39′25.50″N 7°24′42″W) on the tidal island of Vallay, North Uist, and he excavated many sites in the area around Vallay, dating from the first millennium BC to the first millennium AD. These excavations, together with his studies of other parts of North Uist, led to the publication of North Uist: Its Archaeology and Topography in 1911. Today, he is regarded as one of the first and most significant archaeological excavators in the Outer Hebrides. Some of the objects that he recovered are preserved in the Erskine Beveridge Collection at the National Museums Scotland.

His notes formed the basis of two further books that were published posthumously. The 'Abers' and 'Invers' of Scotland (1923) was a study of Scottish place-names, and Fergusson's Scottish Proverbs (1924) was an annotated edition of a compilation published by David Fergusson in Edinburgh in 1641.

He was also an amateur photographer, illustrating some of his books with his own photographs. A two-volume collection of collotype reproductions was published in 1922 as Wanderings with a Camera, 1882–1898. The Royal Commission on the Ancient and Historical Monuments of Scotland holds about 500 of his original glass plate photographic negatives.

Beveridge was a fellow of the Royal Society of Edinburgh and of the Society of Antiquaries of Scotland, serving as vice-president of the latter from 1915 to 1918. The University of St Andrews awarded him an honorary degree.

He married twice, first in 1872 to Mary Owst (1853–1904), with whom he had six sons and a daughter, and second to Margaret Scott Inglis, with whom he had two sons. He was a member of the Scottish Episcopal Church. He died at his house in Dunfermline, called St Leonard's Hill, after an operation for throat cancer. He was buried in the churchyard of Dunfermline Abbey.

== Bibliography ==
- 1893 – The Churchyard Memorials of Crail.
- 1901 – A Bibliography of Dunfermline and the West of Fife.
- 1901 – A Bibliography of works relating to Dunfermline and the west of Fife, including publications of writers connected with the district.
- 1903 – Coll and Tiree: Their Prehistoric Forts and Ecclesiastical Antiquities.
- 1911 – North Uist: Its Archaeology and Topography.
- 1917 – The Burgh Records of Dunfermline, 1485–1584.
- 1922 – Wanderings with a Camera, 1882–1898.
- 1923 – The 'Abers' and 'Invers' of Scotland.
- 1924 – Fergusson's Scottish Proverbs.
