= North Uist =

Island and community in the Outer Hebrides of Scotland

Uibhist a Tuath (Gaelic); North Uist (Scots)
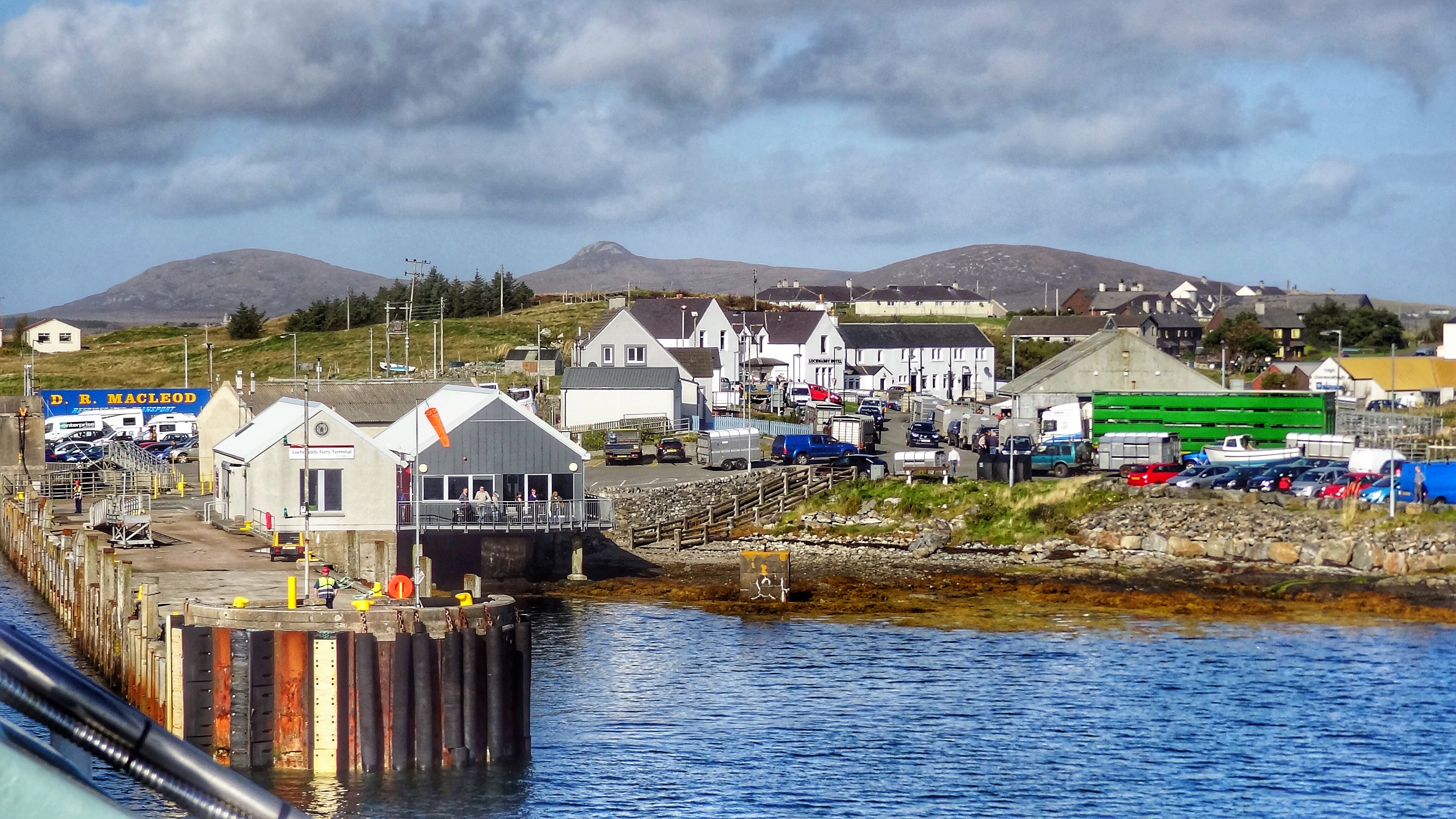
- Lochmaddy pier

Location
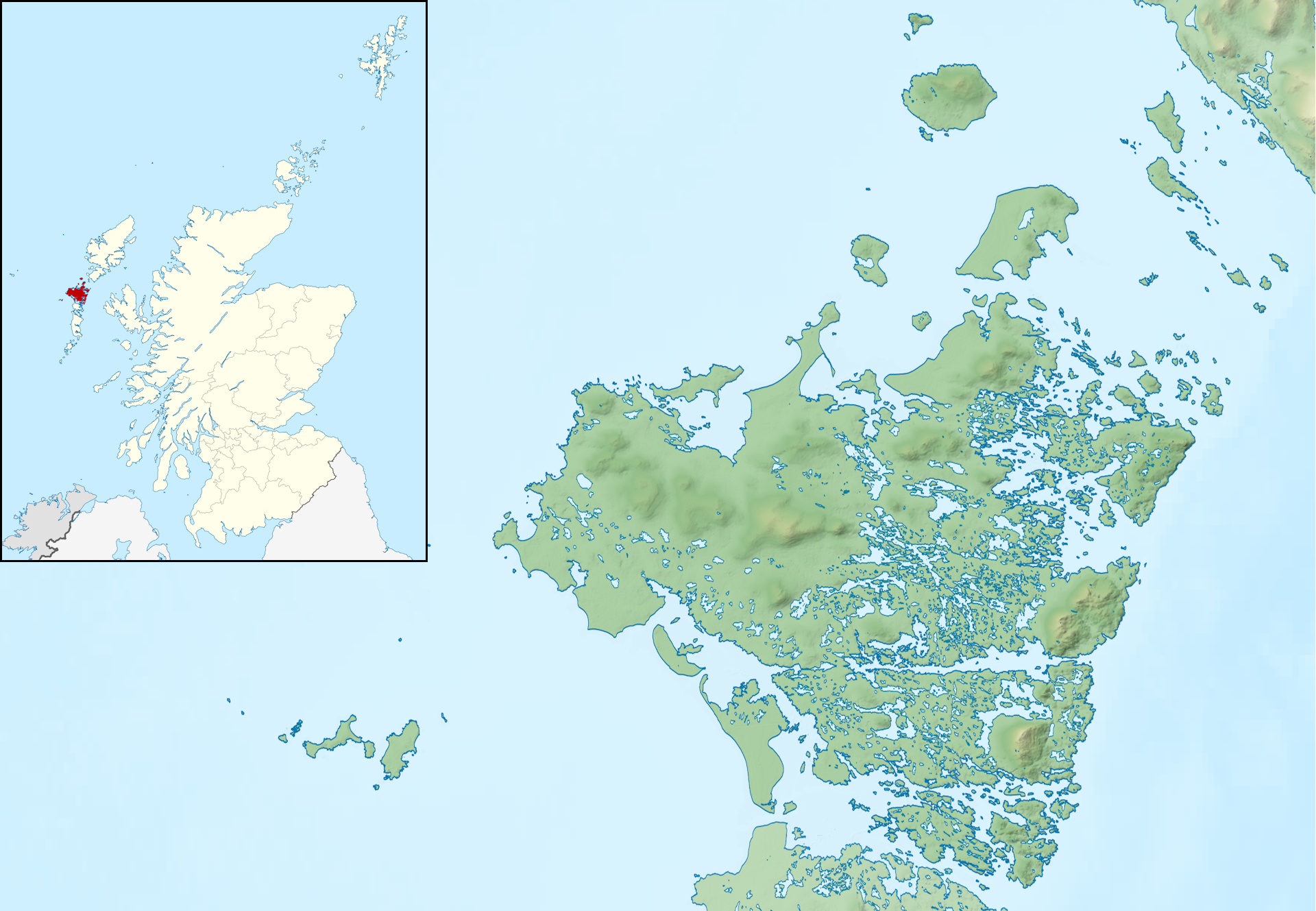
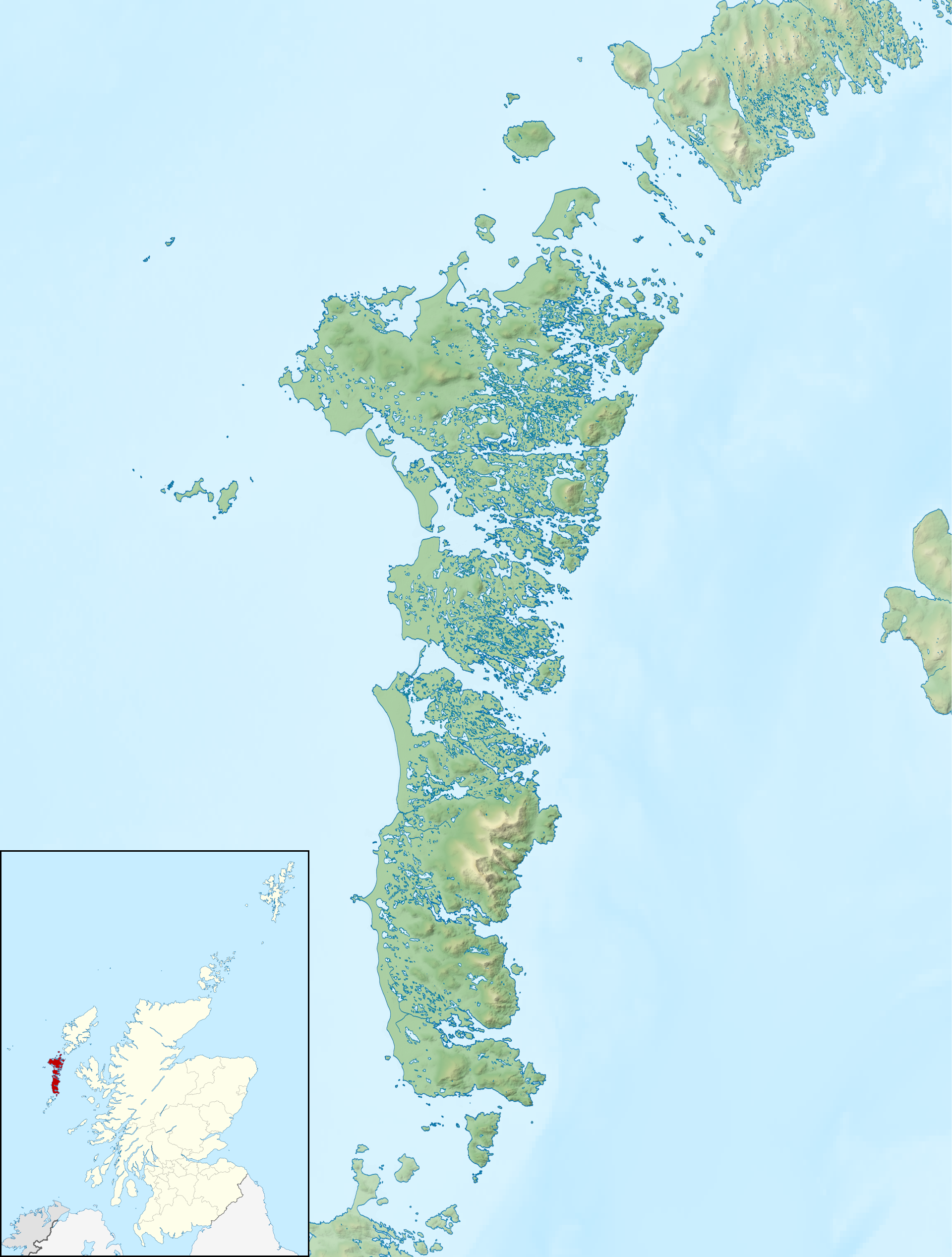
- Map of North Uist & surrounding islands North Uist shown within the Outer Hebrides North Uist (Outer Hebrides)
- OS grid reference: NF835697
- Coordinates: 57.6°N 7.333°W

Name
- Gaelic pronunciation: [ˈɯ.ɪʃtʲ ə ˈt̪ʰuə]
- Name meaning: The etymology of "Uibhist" is unclear.

Physical geography
- Island group: Uist and Barra
- Area: 30,305 ha (74,885 acres)
- Area rank: 10
- Highest elevation: Eaval 1,138 ft (347 m)

Administration
- Council area: Comhairle nan Eilean Siar
- Country: Scotland
- Sovereign state: United Kingdom

Demographics
- Population: 1,208
- Population rank: 13
- Population density: 4 people/km^{2}
- Largest settlement: Lochmaddy

Ramsar Wetland
- Official name: North Uist Machair and Islands
- Designated: 22 July 1997
- Reference no.: 1004

North Uist (Scottish Gaelic: Uibhist a Tuath) is an island and community in the Outer Hebrides of Scotland.

== Etymology ==
In Donald Munro's A Description of the Western Isles of Scotland Called Hybrides of 1549, North Uist, Benbecula and South Uist are described as one island of Ywst (Uist). Starting in the south of this 'island', he described the division between South Uist and Benbecula where "the end heirof the sea enters, and cuts the countrey be ebbing and flowing through it". Further north of Benbecula he described North Uist as "this countrey is called Kenehnache of Ywst, that is in Englishe, the north head of Ywst".

Some have taken the etymology of Uist from Old Norse, meaning "west", much like Westray in Orkney. Another speculated derivation of Uist from Old Norse is Ívist, derived from vist meaning "an abode, dwelling, domicile".

A Gaelic etymology is also possible, with I-fheirste meaning "Crossings-island" or "Fords-island", derived from I meaning "island" and fearsad meaning "estuary, sand-bank, passage across at ebb-tide". Place-names derived from fearsad include Fersit, and Belfast. Mac an Tàilleir (2003) suggests that a Gaelic derivation of Uist may be "corn island". However, whilst noting that the -vist ending would have been familiar to speakers of Old Norse as meaning "dwelling", Gammeltoft (2007) says the word is "of non-Gaelic origin" and that it reveals itself as one of a number of "foreign place-names having undergone adaptation in Old Norse". In contrast, Clancy (2018) has argued that Ívist itself is an Old Norse calque on an earlier Gaelic name, Ibuid or Ibdaig, which corresponds to Ptolemy’s Eboudai. (Note: Coates (2006) speculativelylinked the names Uist and Ibiza, an island in the Mediterranean, arguing for an origin in Semitic meaning "island of a fragrant plant", acknowledging the possibility the name being subject to the influence of Norse ívist.)

== Geography ==
North Uist is the tenth-largest Scottish island and the thirteenth-largest island surrounding Great Britain. It has an area of 117 square miles (303 square kilometres), slightly smaller than South Uist. North Uist is connected by causeways to Benbecula via Grimsay, to Berneray, and to Baleshare. With the exception of the south east, the island is very flat, and covered with a patchwork of peat bogs, low hills and lochans, with more than half the land being covered by water. Some of the lochs contain a mixture of fresh and tidal salt water, giving rise to some complex and unusual habitats. Loch Sgadabhagh, about which it has been said "there is probably no other loch in Britain which approaches Loch Scadavay in irregularity and complexity of outline", is the largest loch by area on North Uist although Loch Obisary has about twice the volume of water. The northern part of the island is part of the South Lewis, Harris and North Uist National Scenic Area, one of 40 in Scotland.

== Geology ==
In common with the rest of the Western Isles, North Uist is formed from the oldest rocks in Britain, the Lewisian gneiss which dates from the Archaean eon. A zone running west from Lochmaddy to Baleshare has abundant metasediments and metavolcanics. The direction of inclination of layered textures or foliation in this metamorphic rock is typically to the north but varies widely across the island. Pockets of metabasic rocks equivalent to the Scourie dyke suite are developed in certain areas, particularly in the north. Banded metabasic rocks and Archaean granites are found in the northwest around Loch Phaibeil. A band of pseudotachylyte curves north the northwest through the centre of the island. The island is traversed by numerous normal faults many of which run broadly NW-SE though ranging from E-W to NNW-SSE. Loch Eport is developed along one such fault. The Outer Hebrides Thrust Zone runs along the eastern coast of the island and brings distinctive gneisses which form the rough hilly terrain along that coast. More recent geological deposits include blown sand along the northern and western coasts and peat inland.

== History ==
=== Prehistory ===
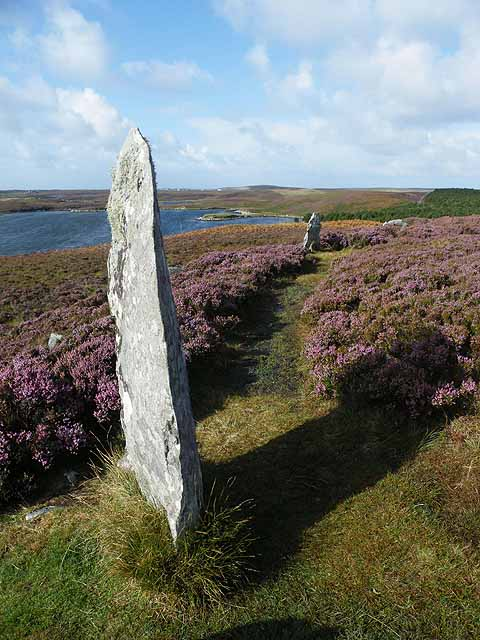
The remains of Pobull Fhinn stone circle

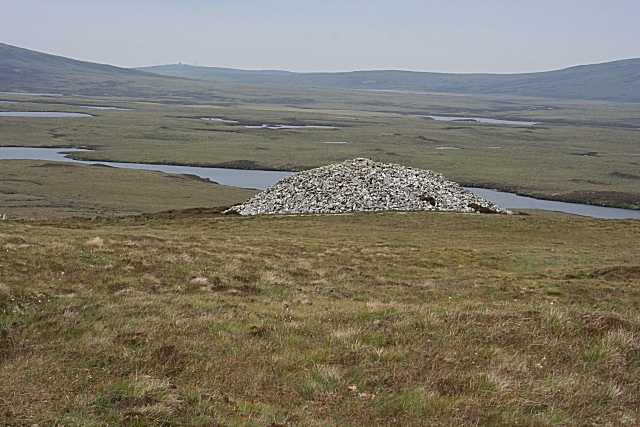
The cairn at Langass

A number of standing stones from the Neolithic period are scattered throughout the island, including a stone circle at Pobull Fhinn. In addition to these, a large burial cairn, in almost pristine condition, is located at Barpa Langass. The island remained inhabited for at least part of the Bronze Age; a burial from this period was found on the Udal peninsula (near Sollas). For the Iron Age, in addition to the wheelhouses typical of the Outer Hebrides, the remains of a broch(fort), from the late Iron Age, can be found at Dun an Sticir; there was formerly another broch near Scolpaig, but it was replaced by Scolpaig Tower in the 19th century.

=== Kingdom of the Isles ===
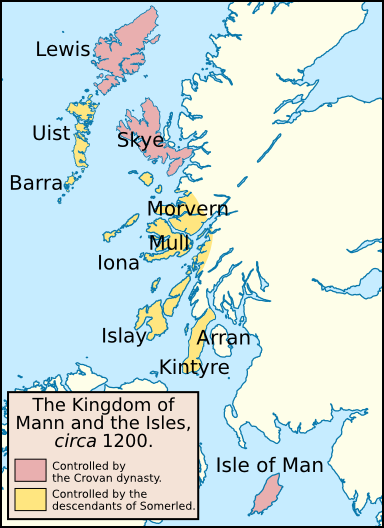
The Suðreyjar in about 1200: the lands of the Crovan dynasty and the descendants of Somerled.

In the 9th century Viking settlers established the Kingdom of the Isles throughout the Hebrides. Following Norwegian unification, the Kingdom of the Isles became a crown dependency of the Norwegian king; to the Norwegians it was the Suðreyjar (meaning "southern isles").

In the mid-12th century, Somerled, a Norse-Gael of uncertain origin, launched a coup, which made the Suðreyjar effectively independent. Following his death, Norwegian authority was nominally restored, but in practice, the kingdom was divided between Somerled's heirs (Clann Somhairle), and the dynasty that Somerled had deposed (the Crovan dynasty). The MacRory, a branch of Somerled's heirs, ruled Uist, as well as Barra, Eigg, Rùm, the Rough Bounds, Bute, Arran, and northern Jura.

In the 13th century Scottish forces attempted to conquer parts of Suðreyjar, culminating in the indecisive Battle of Largs. In 1266, the matter was settled by the Treaty of Perth, which transferred the whole of Suðreyjar to Scotland, in exchange for the sum of 4000 marks.

=== Lordship of Garmoran ===
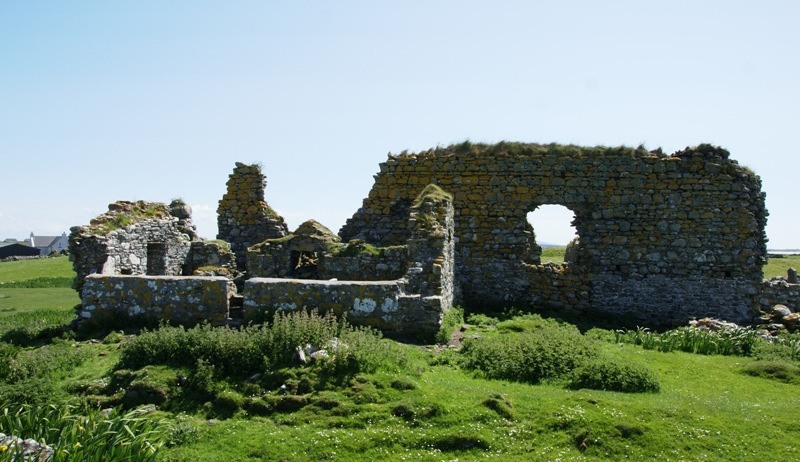
The ruins of Teampull na Trionaid, an Augustinian nunnery and "college of learning" at Carinish said to have been founded by Bethóc, daughter of Somerled, and rebuilt and enlarged by Amy of Garmoran, after her divorce from John of Islay, Lord of the Isles.

At the turn of the century, William I had created the position of Sheriff of Inverness, to be responsible for the Scottish highlands, which theoretically now extended to Garmoran. In 1293, however, King John Balliol established the Sheriffdom of Skye, which included the Outer Hebrides. Nevertheless, following his usurpation, the Skye sheriffdom ceased to be mentioned and the Garmoran lordship (including Uist) was confirmed to Ruaidhrí Mac Ruaidhrí. In 1343, King David II issued a further charter for this to Ruaidhrí's son.

In 1346, just three years later, the sole surviving MacRory heir was Amy of Garmoran. The southern parts of the Kingdom of the Isles had become the Lordship of the Isles, ruled by the MacDonalds (another group of Somerled's descendants). Amy married the MacDonald chief, John of Islay, but a decade later he divorced her. As part of the divorce, John deprived his eldest son, Ranald, of the ability to inherit the Lordship of the Isles, in favour of a son by his new wife. As compensation, John granted Lordship of the Uists to Ranald's younger brother Godfrey.

Godfrey had a younger brother, Murdoch, whose heirs, the Siol Murdoch, now claimed to own part of North Uist. This led to a great deal of violent conflict involving Godfrey's family (the Siol Gorrie) and those of his brothers.

In 1427, frustrated with the level of violence generally in the Highlands, King James I demanded that highland magnates should attend a meeting at Inverness. On arrival, many of the leaders were seized and imprisoned. Alexander MacGorrie, son of Godfrey, was considered to be one of the two most reprehensible, and after a quick show trial, was immediately executed.

=== Early Lairds ===
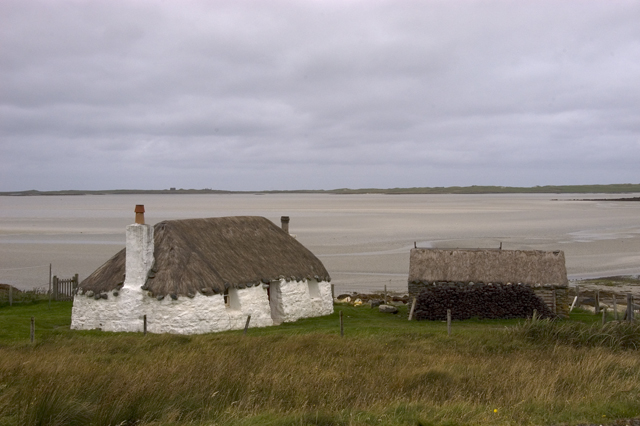
Traditional cottage on Uist

In 1469 James III granted Lairdship of Garmoran, including North Uist, to John of Ross, the Lord of the Isles. In turn, John passed it to his own half-brother, Hugh of Sleat. Hugh died a few years later, and in 1505 his eldest son, John, granted North Uist (and Sleat) to Ranald Bane, the Captain of Clanranald. However, Hugh's second son, Donald Gallach, opposed Clan Ranald and established his own de facto control of North Uist and Sleat. In the following year (1506), Donald was stabbed to death by his own younger brother – Black Archibald. The king authorised Ranald Bane to retake the lands by force.

Three years later Black Archibald returned. He managed to ingratiate himself with James IV, by capturing and handing over two pirates and in 1511, the king pardoned him for his crimes, and confirmed his possession of Sleat and North Uist.

At some point before 1520, Black Archibald was murdered by Donald Gallach's son. Consequently, in 1520, James IV issued a charter awarding lairdship of Sleat and North Uist to Alasdair Crotach MacLeod the leader of the Sìol Tormoid, who possessed neighbouring lands.

After the deaths of Alastair Crotach and his son William in quick succession Alastair's heir was his young granddaughter, Mary MacLeod. Donald Gormson, a descendant of Donald Gallach, took the opportunity to seize Sleat and North Uist. In 1554, Mary of Guise was appointed regent and issued a "commission of fire and sword" against Gormson, who managed to successfully resist. By 1565, the tables turned when he took the queen's side during the Chaseabout Raid and was consequently back in royal favour.

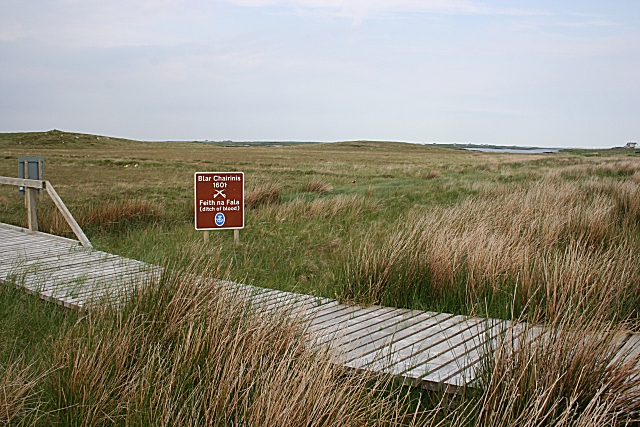
The Battlefield at Carinish

Donald Gorm Mor, Donald Gormson's grandson, was granted a charter in 1596 which acknowledged him as rightful heir of Hugh of Sleat, and confirmed him as laird of Sleat and North Uist. In an attempt to solidify peaceful relations with the Siol Tormoid, Donald Gorm Mor married the daughter of their leader, Rory Mor. Unfortunately, the marriage failed catastrophically, leading to the Battle of Carinish in North Uist, the last battle in Scotland that involved bows and arrows. It led to the Battle of Coire Na Creiche, where Donald Gorm Mor won a more decisive victory, at which point the privy council intervened, and imposed a lasting peace. Donald was succeeded by his nephew, Donald Gorm Og whose loyalty to the king resulted in him being made the first Baronet of Sleat.

=== 18th Century ===
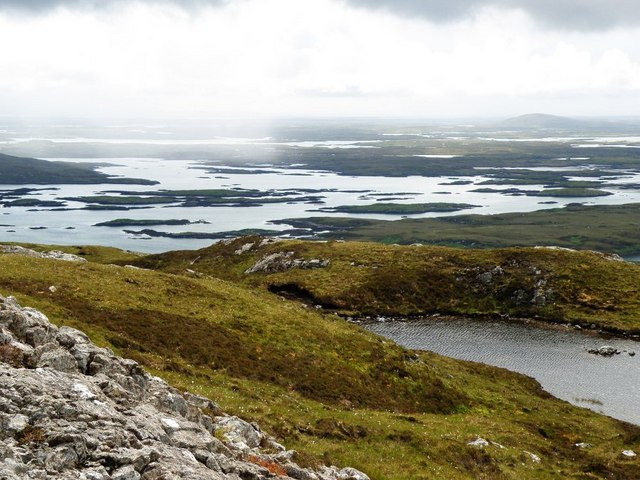
View over southern North Uist

A century later, Sir Donald MacDonald, the 4th Baronet of Sleat, supported the Jacobite rising of 1715, but fell ill and was forced to flee to North Uist. When the Papists Act was passed the following year, requiring his attendance at Inverlochy, he argued that he was too ill to travel. Under the terms of the act, this made him a recusant, and his lairdships were accordingly forfeited, under the terms of the Forfeited Estates Act of the previous year.

On his succession in 1723, the 7th baronet arranged for a middleman to buy back Sleat and North Uist from the Commissioners for £21,000 and pass them on to him. In 1727, he was granted a royal charter formally acknowledging his position as laird of the Sleat and North Uist.

North Uist bard Iain Mac Fhearchair the official poet to the chief, composed poetry criticizing both the Scottish clan chiefs and the Anglo-Scottish landlords of the Highlands and Islands for the often brutal mass evictions of the Scottish Gaels that followed the 1746 Battle of Culloden. Among MacCodrum's most popular anti-landlord poems he mocks Aonghus MacDhòmhnaill, the post-Culloden tacksman of Griminish. It is believed to date from between 1769 and 1773, when overwhelming numbers of Sir Alexander MacDonald's tenants on the isles of North Uist and Skye were reacting to his rackrenting and other harsh treatments by emigrating to the region surrounding the Cape Fear River in North Carolina. The song is known in the oral tradition of North Uist as Òran Fir Ghriminis ("A Song of the Tacksman of Griminish").

=== 19th Century - Kelp and Clearances ===
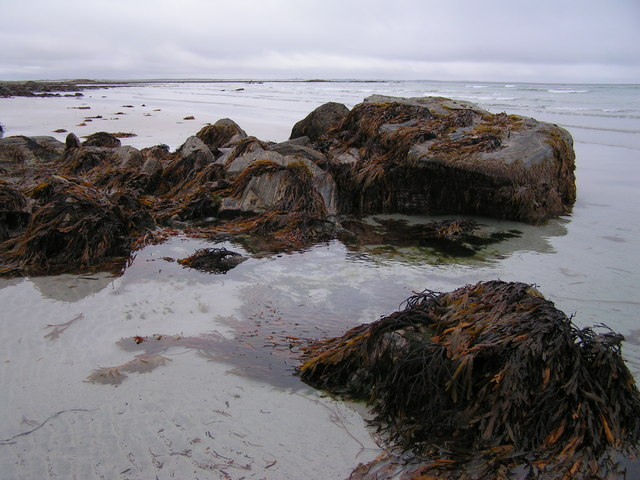
Kelp on the coast of North Uist

During the French Revolutionary Wars, the scarcity of external supplies of minerals to the United Kingdom led to a boom in the kelp industry, which became North Uist's main source of income. When the war ended, the availability of foreign mineral supplies led to an abrupt collapse in the demand for kelp-based products. The burning of kelp had also damaged the fertility of the land. As a result, the crofters of North Uist could no longer afford the rents. Even though the landlords reduced the rents (e.g. in 1827 the rents were reduced by 20%) many resorted to emigration.

In 1826 the villages of Kyles Berneray, Baile Mhic Coinein, and Baile Mhic Phàil, at the north-east corner of North Uist, were abandoned by their inhabitants. Although some moved further south-east to Loch Portain, most of those affected moved to Cape Breton, in Nova Scotia. By 1838, the number of people having left North Uist was reported as 1,300; before the 1820s, the population of North Uist had been almost 5,000, but by 1841 it had fallen to 3,870.

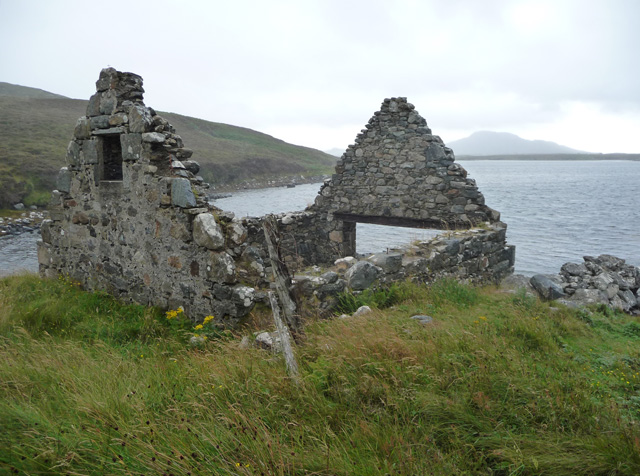
One of many abandoned buildings on Uist

The 7th baronet's heir, Godfrey MacDonal, the 4th Baron of Slate ran sheep on North Uist orchestrating one of the most notable mass evictions of the Highland Clearances. In 1849, an attempt to evict 603 crofters from Sollas caused rioting. Rocks were reportedly thrown at the police officers sent from Glasgow to quell the riot. In the convictions that followed the jury added the following written comments:

...the jury unanimously recommend the pannels to the utmost leniency and mercy of the Court, in consideration of the cruel, though it may be legal, proceedings adopted in ejecting the whole people of Solas from their houses and crops without the prospect of shelter, or a footing in their fatherland, or even the means of expatriating them to a foreign one...

In 1855, Sir Godfrey decided to sell North Uist to Sir John Powlett Orde who gained the reputation of being the worst type of landlord, utterly opposed to any attempt to improve the lot of his tenants. He, in turn, sold parts of the island to his son Sir Arthur Campbell-Orde, mainly in order to frustrate the terms of the Crofter's Acts, which could have allowed crofters to apply for more land, but only on land with the same ownership. Sir Arthur eventually inherited the whole estate; he seems to have been a very different type of landlord, and was involved in the re-crofting of Sollas and other areas."

=== Modern times ===
In 1889, counties were formally created in Scotland, on shrieval boundaries, by a dedicated Local Government Act; North Uist, therefore, became part of the new county of Inverness. Following late 20th century reforms, it became part of Na h-Eileanan an Iar.

In 1944, the Campbell-Orde family sold North Uist Estate, not the whole island, to Douglas Douglas-Hamilton, 14th Duke of Hamilton, who in 1960 sold it in turn to the 5th Earl Granville, and the current laird is Fergus Leveson-Gower, 6th Earl Granville, who lives on the island. The Granville family administers the estate through a trust fund called the North Uist Trust. Some of the machair townships, however, were taken over by the Board of Agriculture and its successors.

The population of North Uist has now dwindled to around 1,200.

== Demography ==
=== Settlements ===
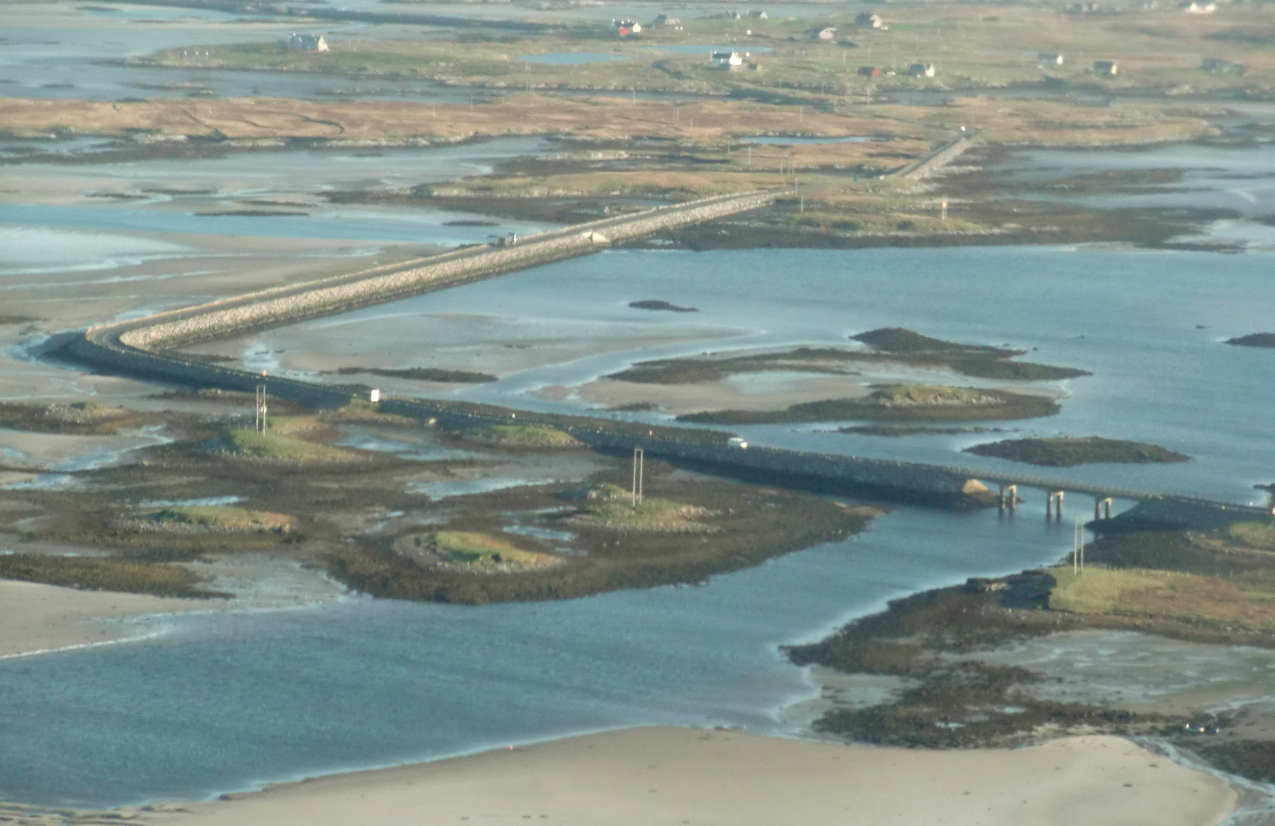
Causeway from Benbecula (foreground) to North Uist

The main settlement on the island is Lochmaddy, a fishing port and home to a museum, an arts centre and a camera obscura. Caledonian MacBrayne ferries sail from the village to Uig on Skye, as well as from the island of Berneray (which is connected to North Uist by road causeway), to Leverburgh in Harris. Lochmaddy also has the Taigh Chearsabhagh — a museum and arts centre with a cafe, small shop and post office service. Nearby is the Uist Outdoor Centre.

The island's main villages are Sollas, Hosta, Tigharry, Hougharry, Paible, Grimsay and Cladach Kirkibost. Other settlements include Clachan Carinish, Knockquien, Port nan Long, Greinetobht and Scolpaig, home to the nineteenth-century Scolpaig Tower folly. Loch Portain is a small hamlet on the east coast — some 9 mi (14 km) from Lochmaddy, with sub areas of Cheesebay and Hoebeg.

=== Population ===
In the 18th century, the total population of the combined Uists rose dramatically, before the population crash of the Highland Clearances. In 1755, the Uists' estimated combined population was 4,118; by 1794 it rose to 6,668; and in 1821 to 11,009.

1841	1881	1891	1931	1961	1971	1981	1991	2001	2011	2022
3,870	3,398	3,250	2,349	1,622	1,469	1,454	1,404	1,271	1,254	1,208

From Haswell-Smith (2004) except as stated.

=== Gaelic ===
According to the 2011 Census, there are 887 Gaelic speakers (61%) on North Uist. The Gaelic dialect spoken is a Southern Hebridean dialect related to that of Harris and the rest of Uist.

== Places of interest ==
North Uist has many prehistoric structures, including the Barpa Langass chambered cairn, the Pobull Fhinn stone circle, Dun an Sticir, the Fir Bhreige standing stones, Eilean Dòmhnuill (which may be the earliest crannog site in Scotland), and the Baile Sear roundhouses, which were exposed by storms in January 2005.

The Vikings arrived in the Hebrides in AD 800 and developed large settlements.

Newer sites of interest are the Uist sculpture trail with two art installations in Lochmaddy. Close by is the Hut of Shadows, a camera obscura.

On the Northern and western side of the island are several white sandy beaches such as Clachan Sands.

The island is known for its bird life, including corncrakes, Arctic terns, gannets, corn buntings and Manx shearwaters. The RSPB has a nature reserve at Balranald.

== Literature ==
- The False Men by Mhairead MacLeod, author. The novel is set in North Uist during the era of the Highland Clearances when all residents of the townships around Sollas were forcibly evicted resulting in the Battle of Sollas.
- Iain Mac Fhearchair (alias John MacCodrum) (1693-–1779) was a Scottish Gaelic poet who spent his life as the "family bard to Sir James MacDonald of Sleat". One of his most popular songs is "Smeòrach Chlann Dòmhnaill" ("The Mavis of Clan Donald"), in which the bard "praises the isle of his birth". The song was recorded by fellow North Uist native Julie Fowlis on her 2014 album Gach sgeul – Every story.
- The war poet Dòmhnall Ruadh Chorùna (1887–1967), a major figure in 20th-century Scottish Gaelic literature, was born on North Uist and lived his life there. Due to his vivid descriptions of his combat experiences during the First World War, he is often referred to as "The Voice of the Trenches".
- Pauline Prior-Pitt, a British poet, lives on North Uist.
- Sollas beach on North Uist is featured in the novel The Chessmen by Peter May.

== Notable residents ==
- Erskine Beveridge, LL.D., FRSE (1851–1920), a textile manufacturer and antiquary and sometime resident of Vallay, completed important archaeological excavations in the Hebrides.
- Julie Fowlis (born 1979), a singer and instrumentalist who sings primarily in Scottish Gaelic, was born and raised on North Uist.
- Alasdair Morrison (born 1968), former Member of the Scottish Parliament for the Western Isles, lived on North Uist and was educated at Paible School.
- Flight Lieutenant John Morrison, 2nd Viscount Dunrossil, CMG, JP (1926–2000), diplomat and Governor of Bermuda, lived at Clachan Sands.
- Brothers Rory and Calum MacDonald, members of the Gaelic rock band Runrig.
- Angus MacAskill (1825–1863), "true giant" and strong man from Berneray, off North Uist.
- Donald Macdonald (1825–1901), a founding minister of the Free Presbyterian Church of Scotland, was born at Langass on North Uist.
- Brothers Angus Matheson (1912–1962), inaugural Professor of Celtic at the University of Glasgow, and William Matheson (1910–1995), a Scottish Gaelic scholar, academic, and ordained minister of the Church of Scotland.
- Fergus Leveson-Gower, 6th Earl Granville (born 1959), laird, lives at Callernish House, near Lochmaddy

== In popular culture ==
The penultimate segment of "Lochdown", the 41st episode (3rd episode of 4th season) of the popular motoring television series The Grand Tour, was filmed on a narrow strait close to Griminish, at the northwest corner of the island, with the presenters building a floating bridge to drive their cars across to the island of Vallay (unlike suggested in the episode, the last segment was filmed in Swindon, not on Vallay).

== See also ==
- List of islands of Scotland

== Bibliography ==
- Ballin Smith, Beverley; Taylor, Simon; and Williams, Gareth (2007) West over Sea: Studies in Scandinavian Sea-Borne Expansion and Settlement Before 1300. Leiden. Brill. ISBN 978-90-04-15893-1
- Mac an Tàilleir, Iain (2003) Goireasan Cànain / Language Resources - Tadhail is Ionnsaich : Pàrlamaid na h-Alba. (pdf) Pàrlamaid na h-Alba. Retrieved 26 October 2025.
