= Highland Aviation =

Coordinates: 57.5414°N 4.0639°W

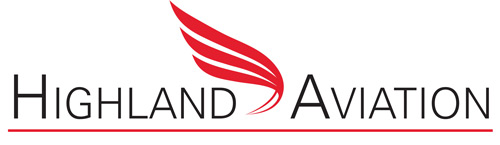

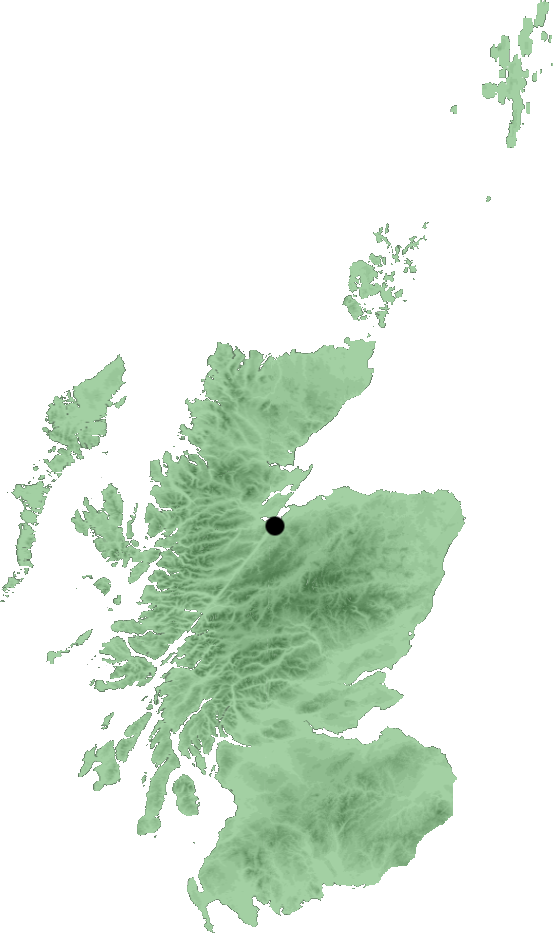
- Formation: April 2009
- Type: Flying school
- Location: Inverness Airport, Scotland
- Website: HighlandAviation.com

Highland Aviation Training Ltd is an aviation training company, based at Inverness Airport in Scotland.

== History ==
Highland Aviation was the first company to gain the CAA's Approved Training Organisation Gyroplanes status.

As of 2026, Highland Aviation is no longer an Approved Training Organisation for Gyroplanes.

== Fleet ==
In 2024 Highland Aviation had a fleet of eight aircraft.

Aircraft	Quantity	Seats
AutoGyro 914 (Cavalon)	1	2
AutoGyro 912 (MTOsport)	1	2
Cessna 172S	1	4
Piper PA28-161	1	4
Piper PA38-112	3	2
