= Cladh Hallan =

Archaeological site in South Uist, Scotland

- Cladh Hàlainn (Scottish Gaelic)
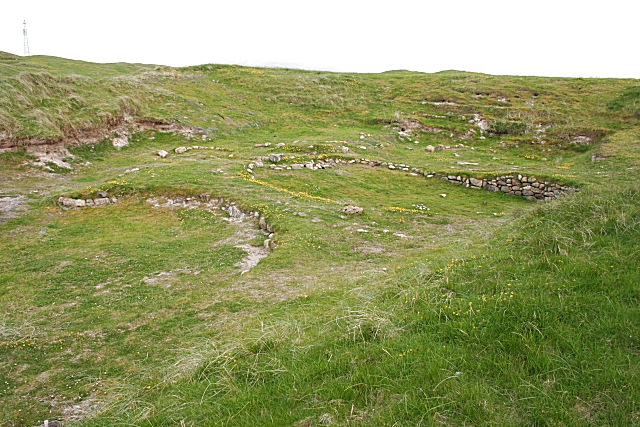
- Remains of roundhouses at Cladh Hallan

- Location within South Uist
- 57.17116°N 7.40759°W
- Type: Prehistoric settlement and burial site
- Periods: Bronze Age
- Location: South Uist, Outer Hebrides, Scotland

History
- First occupied: Approximately 2000 BCE
- Built: Roundhouses: c. 1080–1020 BCE

Site notes
- Excavation dates: 1988–2002
- Public access: Yes
- Two composite mummies discovered beneath a roundhouse floor in 2001

Cladh Hallan (Scottish Gaelic: Cladh Hàlainn, Scottish Gaelic pronunciation: [kʰl̪ˠɤɣ ˈhaːl̪ˠɪɲ]) is an archaeological site on the island of South Uist in the Outer Hebrides, Scotland. It is significant as the only place in Great Britain where prehistoric mummies have been found. Excavations were carried out there between 1988 and 2002, which indicate the site was occupied from 2000 BC.

== Discovery ==
Archaeological excavations at Cladh Hallan began in 1988. Over the next 14 years, archaeologists working on the South Uist Archaeological Project uncovered preserved floors, walls, middens and outdoor surfaces. Beneath these layers, they found traces of earlier ploughed fields, a Bronze Age burial ground and evidence of earlier occupation.

== Roundhouses ==
The settlement included a north–south row of three adjoining roundhouses constructed between 1080 and 1020 BCE. The buildings shared walls, each contained a central hearth, and preserved floor surfaces, sleeping areas, entrances, yards and evidence of repeated rebuilding survived.

== Mummies ==
Near the end of the excavations in 2001, archaeologists believed they had found the remains of four individuals beneath the floors of the Bronze Age roundhouses: two adults and two children.

The adult skeletons were identified as a man and a woman from their skeletal characteristics. The children consisted of a crouched burial estimated to have been between 10 and 14 years old and the largely disarticulated remains of a younger child aged about 18 months to three years.

Because the soft tissue had decomposed, the remains appeared to be ordinary skeletons rather than deliberately preserved bodies. The burials were initially interpreted as representing four individuals who had lived and died during the occupation of the settlement.

== See also ==
- List of bog bodies from Great Britain
