= Lochmaddy =

Coordinates: 57.602°N 7.164°W

Lochmaddy: Scottish Gaelic: Loch nam Madadh
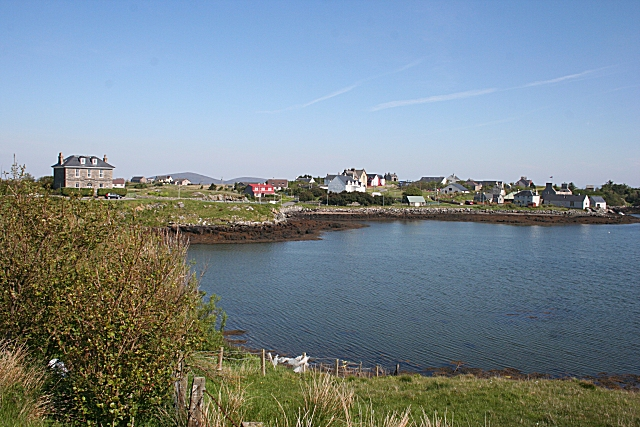
- Lochmaddy viewed from the south

- Location within the Outer Hebrides Lochmaddy (Outer Hebrides)
- Language: Scottish Gaelic; English
- OS grid reference: NF915686
- Civil parish: North Uist
- Council area: Na h-Eileanan Siar
- Lieutenancy area: Western Isles
- Country: Scotland
- Sovereign state: United Kingdom
- Post town: ISLE OF NORTH UIST
- Postcode district: HS6
- Dialling code: 01876
- Police: Scotland
- Fire: Scottish
- Ambulance: Scottish
- UK Parliament: Na h-Eileanan an Iar
- Scottish Parliament: Na h-Eileanan an Iar

Lochmaddy (Scottish Gaelic: Loch nam Madadh [l̪ˠɔx nə ˈmat̪əɣ], "Loch of the Hounds") is the administrative centre of North Uist in the Outer Hebrides, Scotland. Na Madaidhean (the wolves/hounds) are rocks in the bay after which the loch, and subsequently the village, are named. Lochmaddy is within the parish of North Uist.

== Geography ==
Lochmaddy lies on the sea loch of that name and, due to the rocky nature of the coast, is the only settlement of any size on the east coast. Most of the island's settlements are on the west coast. Lochmaddy is at the eastern end of the A865 and close to the eastern end of the A867; these are the only two main roads on the island.

== History ==
Virtually the first mention anywhere of Lochmaddy is a complaint of "piracie and murder" in a report dated 1616: "Lochmaldie on the coast of Uist is a rendezvous for pirates" it said. The coves and inlets around the village were ideal hiding places for raiding ships stocked with fine goods bound for the clan chiefs of the time, and contraband activity persisted until the modern era.

Lochmaddy was an important fishing community before the commercial decline of the herring. During the reign of King Charles it was the site of a Royal Fishing Station. Lochmaddy Sheriff Court was completed in 1875.

== Economy ==
Nowadays, the same good harbour makes Lochmaddy the ferry port for the island, with the MV Hebrides plying the route to Skye. The commercial activity of shops and public building has been generated due to the port activity, and today the village has the only bank, courthouse, tourist information office and youth hostel on North Uist. Lochmaddy hospital closed in March 2001. It was replaced by the newly opened Ospadal Uibhist agus Bharraigh (Uist and Barra Hospital) in Balivanich, Benbecula.

The current laird of North Uist, Fergus Granville, lives at Callernish House, near Lochmaddy.

== Ferry service ==
Caledonian MacBrayne provides year-round ferry service to Uig, on the west coast of the Isle of Skye.

Preceding station	Caledonian MacBrayne	Following station
Terminus	North Uist ferry	Uig Terminus
