= Mingulay =

Island of Bishop's Isles, Outer Hebrides, Scotland

Miughalaigh (Gaelic)

Location
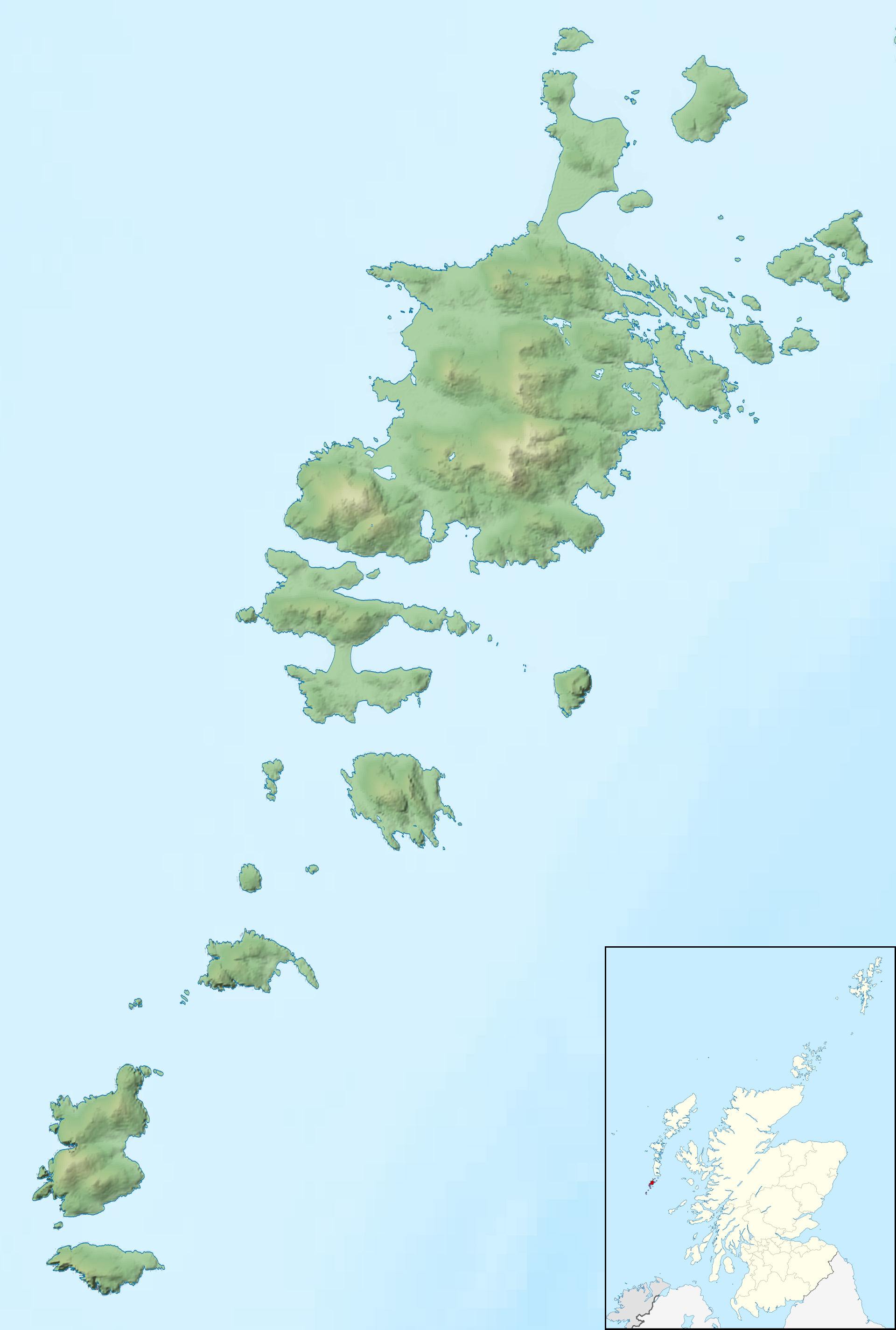
- Mingulay shown within the Bishop's Isles Mingulay shown within the Outer Hebrides
- OS grid reference: NL560830
- Coordinates: 56.811°N 7.637°W

Name
- Gaelic pronunciation: [ˈmjuː.əl̪ˠaj]
- Name meaning: Old Norse for 'Big island'.
- Old Norse name: Mikil-ay

Physical geography
- Island group: Uists and Barra
- Area: 640 ha (2 1/2 sq mi)
- Area rank: 67 out of 162
- Highest elevation: Càrnan, 273 m (896 ft)

Administration
- Council area: Na h-Eileanan Siar
- Country: Scotland
- Sovereign state: United Kingdom

Demographics
- Population: Uninhabited since 1912
- Largest settlement: The abandoned 'Village'.

Mingulay (Scottish Gaelic: Miughalaigh) is the second largest of the Bishop's Isles in the Outer Hebrides of Scotland. Located 12 nautical miles (22 kilometres) south of Barra, it is known for an extensive Gaelic oral tradition incorporating folklore, song and stories and its important seabird populations, including puffins, black-legged kittiwakes, and razorbills, which nest in the sea-cliffs, amongst the highest in the British Isles.

There are Iron Age remains, and the culture of the island was influenced by early Christianity and the Vikings. Between the 15th and 19th centuries Mingulay was part of the lands of Clan MacNeil of Barra, but subsequently suffered at the hands of absentee landlords.

After two thousand years or more of continuous habitation, the island was abandoned by its Gaelic-speaking residents in 1912 and has remained uninhabited since. It is no longer used for grazing sheep. The island is also associated with the "Mingulay Boat Song", although that was composed in 1938. The National Trust for Scotland has owned Mingulay since 2000.

== Geology and soils ==
In the Pleistocene era Mingulay was covered by the ice sheets which spread from Scotland out into the Atlantic Ocean beyond the Outer Hebrides. After the last retreat of the ice around 20,000 years ago, sea levels were lower than at present and circa 14,000 BP it was joined to a single large island comprising most of what is now the Outer Hebrides. Steadily rising sea levels since that time then isolated the island, which is made up of Hebridean gneiss interspersed with some granite. The ice deposited both erratic blocks of rock and boulder clay on the eastern side of the island around Mingulay Bay. The rest of the island is covered in peat, thin acidic soils, or bare rock.

== Geography and pre-history ==
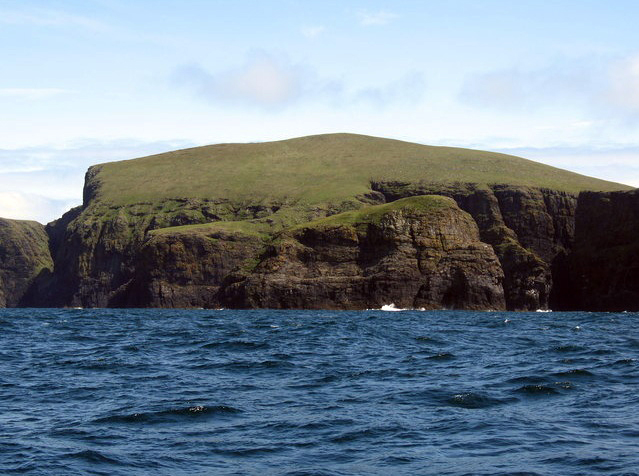
The western cliffs with the stack of Arnamuil in the centre and Bagh na h-Aoineig to the left.

Mingulay is part of the small archipelago known as the Bishop or Barra Isles which are "composed of a cluster of islands surrounded by a boisterous sea, making the passage of one island to another a matter of very considerable hazard" and which form the southern end of the larger Outer Hebrides group.

There is one large beach on the eastern side of the isle, where the only settlement of note ('The Village') was located, and a tiny cove at Skipsdale (Old Norse: ship valley). Bagh na h-Aoineig (Scots Gaelic: bay of the steep promontory) on the western side is a deep cleft in the sea-cliffs once thought to be the highest in the UK which rise to 213 m (699 ft) above sea level at Builacraig.

Mingulay has three large sea stacks: Arnamul (Old Norse: Erne mound), Lianamul (Old Norse: Flax mound) and Gunamul, which has a natural arch in 150 m (490 ft) cliffs through which boats can sail on rare days when the sea is calm. There are several outlying islets including the twin rocks of Sròn a Dùin to the south-west, Geirum Mòr and Geirum Beag to the south between Mingulay and the nearby island of Berneray, and Solon Mòr ('Big Gannet'), Solon Beag ('Little Gannet'), Sgeirean nan Uibhein, Barnacle Rock and a smaller stack called The Red Boy, all to the north between Mingulay and Pabbay.

The highest hills are Càrnan (273 m or 896 ft), Hecla (Old Norse: Hooded shroud) (219 m or 719 ft) and Macphee's Hill (224 m or 735 ft). The last was named when a relief ship was sent by MacNeil of Barra to discover why communications from the island had ceased. A crewman called Macphee was sent ashore and returned to report that the residents had all died of disease. Fearing the plague, his shipmates refused to allow him back on board. He survived for a year, and climbed the hill every day to look out for a rescue. When the island was re-settled the chief of the Clan MacNeil of Barra granted him land there.

The south-western promontory of Dun Mingulay has the remains of an Iron Age fort and there is a pre-historic site at Crois an t-Suidheachain near the western landing place at Aneir at the southern end of Mingulay Bay, which may have been a stone circle. In 1971 a 2,000-year-old Iron Age midden was found resting on sand near the 'Village' overlooking the Bay. A stone 'pebble hammer' was discovered nearby in 1975, but it has not been possible to date the find. Skipisdale may also contain Iron Age remains.

== Name ==
In historic times the Hebrides have been heavily influenced by Celtic, Norse and Scots culture and this is evident in the variety of names the isle possesses. "Mingulay" is derived from Mikil-ay, the Old Norse for "Big Island" although this is misleading as it is only the second largest of the Barra Isles behind Vatersay, which is lower lying and appears smaller from the sea. Miughalaigh and Miùghlaigh are two variants of the Gaelic name. Lowland Scots speakers in their turn have variously described the island as "Mewla" or "Miuley" (which are both approximations of the Gaelic pronunciation), "Megaly" and "Micklay" before finally settling on the current variant.

Murray (1973) states that the name "appropriately means Bird Island".

== History and culture ==
=== Christianity, Norsemen and Clan MacNeil ===
Early Christianity influenced Mingulay (for example the nearby islands of Pabbay and Berneray both have cross-inscribed slabs) but no direct evidence has yet been found. From circa 871 onwards Viking raids on the Outer Hebrides gathered pace but similarly the Viking graves found on Berneray and Vatersay are not replicated on Mingulay and whilst there are no definite indications of Norse settlement, their presence on the island is confirmed by the many features they named.

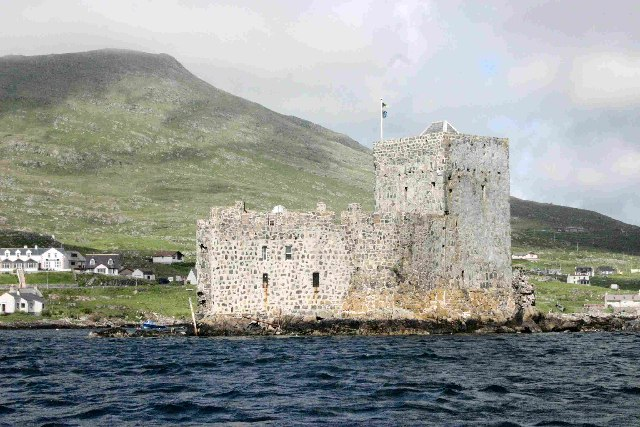
Kisimul Castle, Barra, the ancient seat of Clan MacNeil

Acknowledged by Malcolm III as part of the Kingdom of the Isles, a Norwegian crown dependency, from the 12th century onwards Norwegian power in the Western Isles weakened. By the 1266 Treaty of Perth they reverted to the Scottish crown control under the tutelage of the quasi-autonomous Lordship of Garmoran (ruled by the MacRory, a faction among the rulers of the Kingdom of the Isles). In 1427, following violence between the MacRory heirs to Garmoran (Clan Ranald, the Siol Gorrie, and Siol Murdoch), Garmoran was declared forfeit.

That same year – 1427 – following the forfeiture, the Lords of the Isles (the remaining MacRory heirs) awarded Lairdship of Barra (and its associated islands) and half of South Uist to Clan MacNeil of Barra. They adopted the cliffs of Builacraig as part of their traditional crest and used the name as a war-cry. However, following acts of piracy by the MacNeils, king James VI transferred ownership of some of the southern archipelago (including Mingulay) to the Bishop of the Isles (Note: The Bishopric originated with the Kingdom of the Isles.), hence those islands became known as the Bishop's Isles .

The islanders' livelihood was based on fishing (for white fish, herring and lobster), crofting (with up to 55 ha (0.21 sq mi) of arable and pasture land fertilised by wrack on which sheep, cattle, ponies, pigs and poultry were kept) and very dependent on the bounty provided by seabirds. For example, rent was payable to The MacNeil in fachaich or 'fatlings' – shearwater chicks.

The Reformation never reached the south of the Outer Hebrides and Roman Catholicism held sway from the 12th century to the early 20th. The lack of a resident priest meant that services were often organised by the lay community, but the local culture and traditions of songs and story-telling were rich and varied. As Samuel Johnson observed when lamenting his failure to reach thus far on his 18th-century Hebridean journey:

Popery is favourable to ceremony; and among the ignorant nations ceremony is the only preservative of tradition. Since Protestantism was extended to the savage parts of Scotland, it has perhaps been one of the chief labours of the Ministers to abolish stated observances, because they continued the remembrance of the former religion.

Some of the local beliefs were perhaps less welcome to the practitioners of organised religion. An each-uisge was thought to live in a bottomless well near the summit of Macphee's Hill, and faery sidhes and their associated music were taken for granted, if generally avoided. The curative powers of the seventh son of a seventh son were assumed to be sufficient for the treatment of diseases as serious as tuberculosis. Yet the old ways themselves were dying.

=== Absentee landlords ===
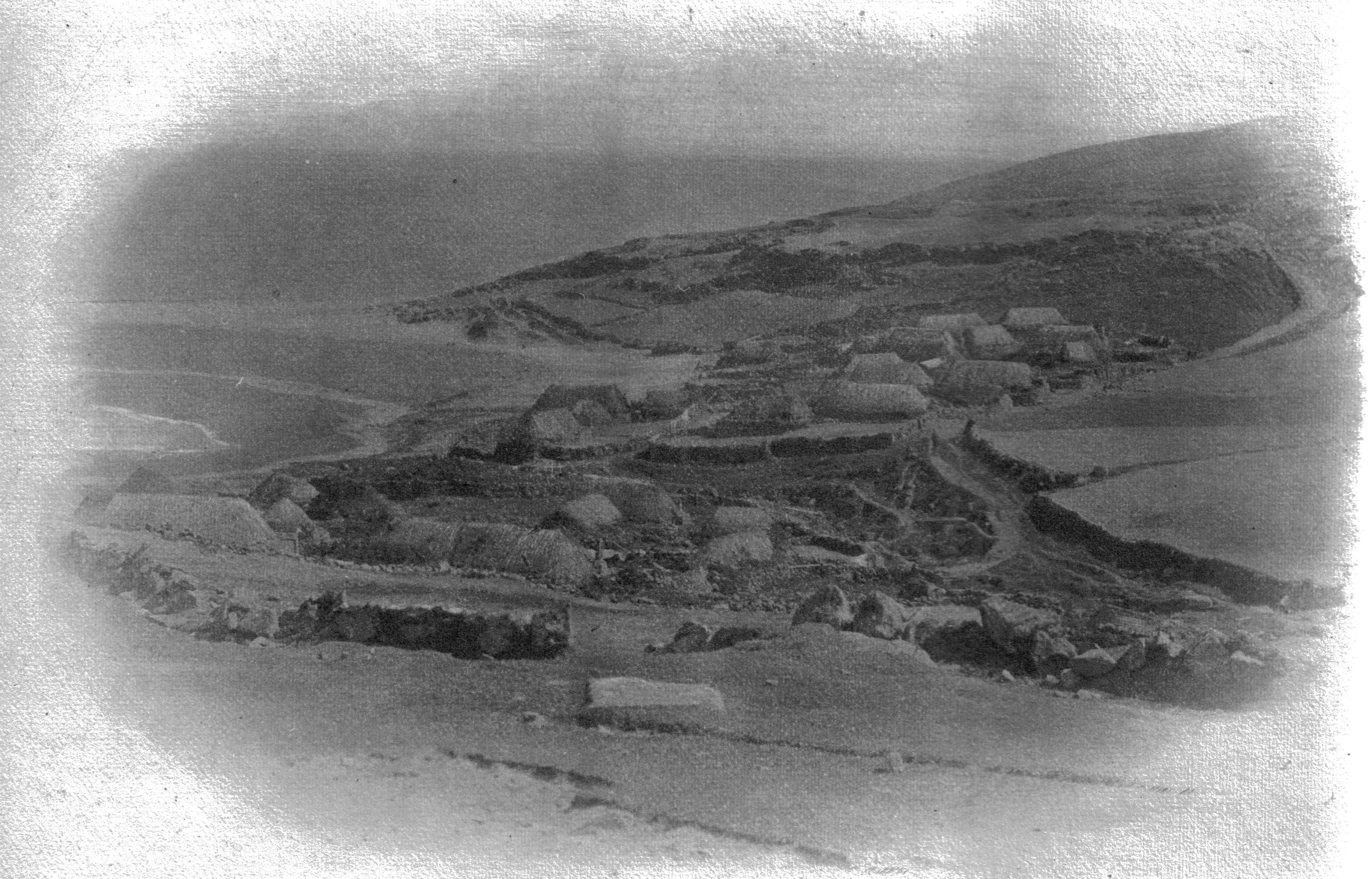
Mingulay village in 1888.

The Barra estates of MacNeil (including all the Barra Isles) were sold to Colonel John Gordon of Cluny Aberdeenshire in 1840 whose lack of consideration for his tenants during the potato famines was matched by his zeal for evictions to create sheep farms. However, the Highland Clearances seemed to have the effect of increasing Mingulay's population as families evicted from Barra sometimes chose to re-settle there rather than take the emigrant ships to Nova Scotia. In this regard Mingulay's remoteness was probably an advantage and rents were reduced from 1840 to 1845. In 1878 Lady Gordon Cathcart inherited the estate and visited but once during her fifty-four year period of tenure.

In 1764 the population of the island was 52. Later census records show that there were 113 residents in 1841, 150 in 1881, 142 in 1891 (occupying 28 houses, compared to the 1841 total of 19), and 135 in 1901. Families were often large, and ten or more children was not uncommon, with three generations sometimes sharing a single small house. Life was co-operative with fishing, waulking, peat cutting and landing the boats all being communal activities. The island is remote but was by no means cut off. In the 19th century fishermen sold fish in Glasgow and Ireland, both men and women worked on the east coast herring fishing industry, and food was brought in from mainland Scotland on a regular basis.

At the height of village life there was a mill, a chapel house consisting of a church and a priest's residence, and a school. However, despite there being a continuous population on Mingulay for at least two thousand years, evacuations began in 1907 and the island was completely abandoned by its residents in 1912.

=== Evacuation ===
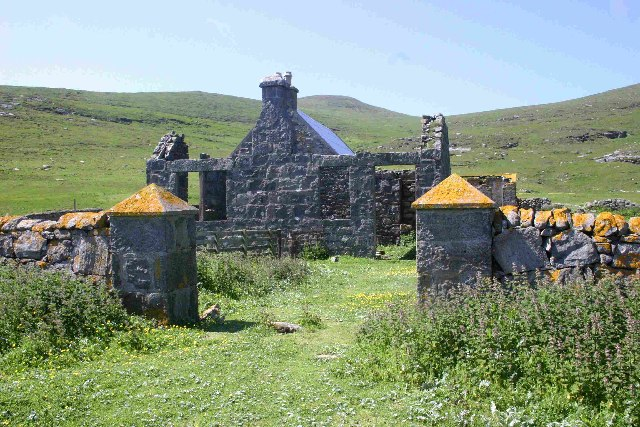
The old school house

There were numerous reasons for the evacuation. In 1897 a boat from the neighbouring island of Pabbay was lost off Barra Head with its crew of five: more than half of Pabbay's male population, and this did not encourage confidence amongst the fishermen of Mingulay. The lack of a sheltered landing meant that the island could be unreachable for weeks at a time, and loading and unloading goods was at best strenuous and at worst hazardous. This may have meant less at a time when possessions were fewer, but no doubt the population was also increasingly aware of their relative isolation. Writing about the collapse of similar populations in the Hebrides, Neat (2000) suggests:

one common thread would appear to be the unwillingness of even the most stoical and historically-aware communities to continue an existence based upon endless physical hardship when the opportunity of an easier livelihood elsewhere is there to be taken.

Buxton (1995) tells the story of two men who left Mingulay together. One was visiting Barra, and the other intended to emigrate to New York. They said their farewells in Castlebay but it did not work out for the latter and he returned from the United States three months later. To his great surprise he met his friend in Castlebay again, who explained that he had been unable to return to Mingulay since they had last met because of adverse sea conditions. Similar difficulties experienced by visiting priests or doctors bound for Mingulay were a constant source of concern to the islanders.

The ferocity of the weather also created constant hardship. In 1868 a wave washed over the top of Geirum Mor, taking the sheep with it. The summit of the islet is 51 metres (170 ft) above sea level. Fraser Darling and Boyd (1969) also speculate about the "quiet failure" of the populations of small islands like Mingulay to husband their available natural resources. Certainly the population began to exceed the carrying capacity of the land. The Congested Districts Board installed a derrick to assist with the landings at Aneir at the south end of the Bay in 1901, but the design was flawed and its failure was a further disappointment.

In July 1906 grazing land on Vatersay was raided by landless cottars from Barra and its isles, including three families from Mingulay. They were followed in 1907 by eight more raiders from Mingulay led by Micheal Neill Eachainn. Lady Gordon Cathcart took legal action but the visiting judge took the view that she had neglected her duties as a landowner and that "long indifference to the necessities of the cottars had gone far to drive them to exasperation". Vatersay has sheltered anchorages and was only 300 metres (330 yd) from Barra (until the construction of a causeway in 1990) and Neil MacPhee wrote "it is better a thousand times to die here than to go through the same hardships which were our lot" on Mingulay.

In November 1907 six more families consisting of 27 individuals from Mingulay squatted on Sandray, which has a sheltered beach. Meanwhile, the plight of the Vatersay raiders had been raised at Westminster. Despite considerable public sympathy they were eventually sentenced to two months in prison. Shortly thereafter the Congested Districts Board purchased the entire island of Vatersay with the aim of providing new crofts. By the next summer there were 14 Mingulay families living there. Only six families remained on Mingulay itself, and all of them planned to leave.

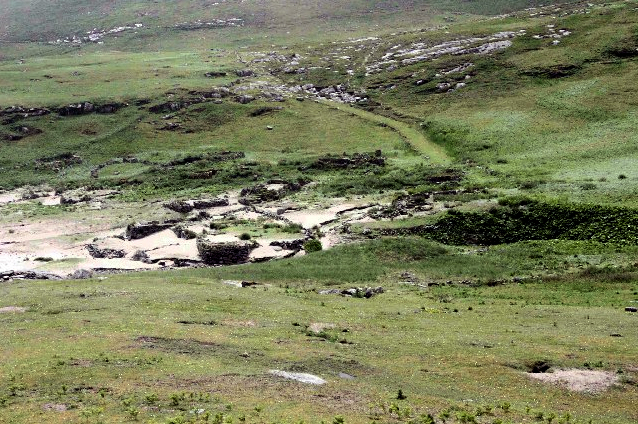
The ruins of the sand-encroached Village from the north

By 1910 there were only a dozen fishermen in six families living there, and in summer 1912 the island was finally abandoned. Some may have wished to stay, but by now the population had been reduced below a viable number and the lack of a school, which had closed in April 1910, would have been a factor. There is also no doubt that the parish priest, Donald Martin, encouraged the desertion. It is claimed that neither did he like travelling there, nor did the church receive much in the collection box on his visits.

Mingulay bears physical similarities to the island of Hirta, which was evacuated in 1930, although Storey (2008) confirms that the abandonment of Mingulay was unlike that of St Kilda: the Mingulay islanders left of their own accord, and did not have the benefit of Government support as in the St Kilda situation. Mingulay is sometimes referred to as the "near St Kilda". Mingulay is less than a third of the distance from "The Long Island" that Hirta is, yet a 19th-century visitor commented that the former was "much more primitive than St Kilda, especially as regards the cottars' and crofters' houses", suggesting that the lack of a permanent landing was of greater import than sheer distance.

=== 1912 to the present day ===
After the island was evacuated it was first tenanted and then purchased in 1919 by Jonathan MacLean from Barra. In 1930 it was sold to John Russell who had experience as a sheep farmer in both Australia and Montana. Russell was clearly a man who liked his own company, choosing to live on the island alone all autumn and winter with his pet ferrets and cats, and joined by two shepherds for the spring and summer only. After seven years he sold up to Peggy Greer, a farmer from Essex who visited only rarely and let the grazings out to local farmers. In 1951 she attempted to sell the island herself, but without success until 1955 when a local crofters' syndicate called the Barra Head Isles Sheepstock Company completed the purchase. The advent of motor boats made stocking the islands considerably easier and the company's ownership continued for the next forty years.

In 2000 Mingulay was acquired by the National Trust for Scotland through a bequest by J. M. Fawcitt "to provide an area of natural beauty in memory of her parents and the courage of her late brother, Bernard."

Only two buildings survive on the island: the schoolhouse and the chapel house, although the latter was damaged by storms in the early 20th century. The schoolhouse was restored by the National Trust for Scotland in 2013 and is used as accommodation for researchers and conservationists.

== Flora and fauna ==
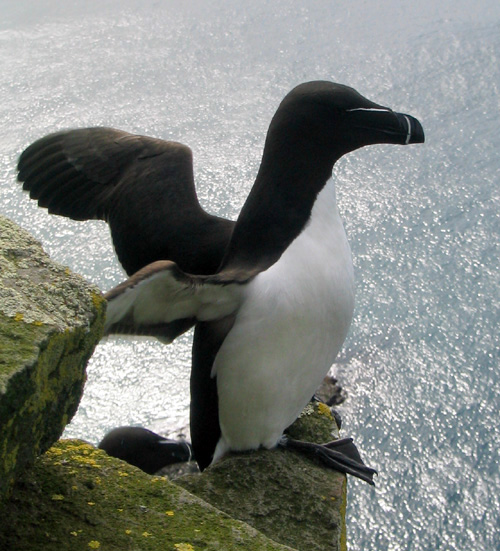
Razorbill: Alca torda

Mingulay has a large seabird population, and is an important breeding ground for razorbills (9,514 pairs, 6.3% of the European population), guillemots (11,063 pairs) and black-legged kittiwakes (2,939 pairs). shags (694 individuals), fulmar (11,626 pairs), puffins (2,072 pairs), storm petrel, common terns, Arctic terns, bonxies and various species of gull also nest in the sea-cliffs. Manx shearwaters nested on Lianamul stack until the late 18th century, when they were driven away by puffins, and tysties have also been recorded there.

In recent years, to help limit the spread of bird flu, access to the puffin colonies has been restricted through the use of sections of metal fences but it is still possible to get quite close to the burrows. The Ultimate Mingulay Travel Guide (2025)

The last sheep were taken off the island in 2007 but there is still a population of rabbits, introduced by shepherds after the 1912 evacuation. In recent years, there have been reports of a small number of guinea pigs on the east coast of the island. It is unknown how they got there and are rarely spotted. Sightings remark on their long hair and thick coats, likely as a result of the different climate. Grey seals are abundant, numbers having grown substantially since the departure of human residents. Although they do not breed, up to 1,000 make use of the beach in winter.

The flora of the island is typical of the Outer Hebrides with heather, sphagnum moss, sedges, grass and bracken predominating. There is but a single tree – a 2-metre high poplar on a cliff overlooking Mingulay Bay. Sea holly, otherwise rare in the Western Isles, has grown on Mingulay since at least the late nineteenth century, and sea milkwort, normally only found at sea level is able to grow on the high cliff tops due to the ocean spray and seagull manure. In spring and summer there are profusions of wild flowers around the deserted Village.

Mingulay and nearby Berneray became a Site of Special Scientific Interest in 1983.

=== Important Bird Area ===
The island (along with neighbouring Berneray) has been designated an Important Bird Area (IBA) by BirdLife International because it supports breeding populations of several species of seabirds.

== Visiting Mingulay ==
The island attracts regular visits from naturalists and in recent years has also become popular with rock climbers. The National Trust for Scotland operates two licensed boatmen from Barra and further information may be available at the tourist office in Castlebay.

There is an "occasional" anchorage in Mingulay Bay sheltered from westerly winds. Landing on the beach may be difficult as there is a regular heavy swell and approaching the old landing place at Aneir may be easier. There is also a landing place at Skipisdale.

== Mingulay Boat Song ==
The "Mingulay Boat Song" was composed by Hugh S. Roberton, the founder of the Glasgow Orpheus Choir, in 1938, and first recorded by the Francis McPeake family of Ulster. Written in the style of Hebridean work songs to the tune Creag Guanach from Lochaber, it invites the listener to imagine the boatsmen of the island singing in time to the pulling of their oars.

Chorus
Heel ya'ho boys, let her go, boys
Bring her head round now all together
Heel ya'ho boys, let her go boys
Sailing homeward to Mingulay!

What care we tho' white the Minch is
What care we for wind and weather?
Let her go boys, every inch is
Wearing homeward to Mingulay!

Chorus

Wives are waiting on the bank, boys,
Looking seaward from the heather.
Pull her 'round boys, and we'll anchor
'Ere the sun sets at Mingulay!

Chorus

It has been recorded by numerous artists including Robin Hall and Jimmy MacGregor in 1971, The Idlers and Richard Thompson in 2006, and by Kris Delmhorst on her 2003 Songs for a Hurricane album.

The lyrics have also been variously interpreted. For example, Hall and MacGregor's 1961 version has a female vocalist (Shirley Bland) rendering the third stanza as:

We are waiting by the harbour,
Weeping, waiting since break of day-o.
We are waiting by the harbour,
As the sun sets on Mingulay.

Although the fame of the song means that it is one of the few things popularly associated with the island and it is evocative of island life, it was never sung by its residents, having been composed long after the evacuation.

Other songs composed by or about residents of the island survive. These include "Oran do dh'Eilean Mhiulaidh" (Song to the Isle of Mingulay) written by Neil MacPhee the Vatersay raider (see above), after the abandonment of the island, and "Turas Neill a Mhiughlaigh" (Neil's Trip to Mingulay) written by Father Allan MacLean (known locally as the "Curate of Spain" having attended the Scots College in Valladolid), possibly during the period 1837–40 when he lived on Barra. Songs and oral tradition relating to Mingulay are discussed in Liza Storey's Muinntir Mhiughalaigh (2008).

== In literature ==
- There is a local tradition that French gold intended to support the 1745 Jacobite rebellion was hidden in a sea cave on the west coast. This story forms the basis of the novel Children of Tempest by Neil Munro.
- Mingulay is the name of an isolated human colony in Ken MacLeod's Cosmonaut Keep, book one in the "Engines Of Light" series of science-fiction novels.
- In the science-fiction novel A Boy and his Dog at the End of the World by C. A. Fletcher, Mingulay is the home of a family a few generations removed from the ending of human civilisation, and the first location setting of the story.

== See also ==
- List of islands of Scotland
- North Rona

== Bibliography ==
- Buxton, Ben (1995). Mingulay: An Island and Its People. Edinburgh. Birlinn. ISBN 1-874744-24-6.
- Darling, F. Fraser & Boyd, J. M. (1969). Natural History in the Highlands and Islands. London. Bloomsbury. ISBN 1-870630-98-X.
- Haswell-Smith, Hamish (2004). The Scottish Islands. Edinburgh. Canongate. ISBN 1-84195-454-3.
- Martin, Martin (1703). A Description of the Western Isles of Scotland Including a Voyage to St. Kilda Retrieved 8 October 2008.
- Murray, W. H. (1973). The Islands of Western Scotland. London. Eyre Methuen. SBN 413303802.
- Neat, Timothy (2000). When I Was Young: Voices from Lost Communities in Scotland – The Islands. Edinburgh. Birlinn. ISBN 1-84158-039-2.
- Storey, Liza (Lisaidh Dhonnchaidh Mhoir) (2008). Muinntir Mhiughalaigh. Inverness. CLAR. ISBN 978-1-900901-14-7.
