= Gordon baronets =

Set index for Gordon baronets

There have been eleven Gordon baronetcies. Of those, two are extant as of 2026, with the baronets of Embo dormant.

- Gordon baronets of Letterfourie, Sutherland (1625), initially Gordon baronets of Gordonstoun
- Gordon baronets of Cluny, Aberdeen (1625)
- Gordon baronets of Lesmore, Aberdeen (1625)
- Gordon baronets of Lochinvar, Kirkcudbright (1626): see Viscount of Kenmure
- Gordon baronets of Embo, Sutherland (1631)
- Gordon baronets of Haddo, Aberdeen (1642): see Marquess of Aberdeen and Temair
- Gordon baronets of Park, Banff (1686)
- Gordon baronets of Dalpholly, Sutherland (1704)
- Gordon baronets of Earlston, Kirkcudbright (1706)
- Gordon baronets of Newark-upon-Trent (1764)
- Gordon baronets of Northcourt, Isle of Wight (1818)
