= Gordon baronets of Earlston, Kirkcudbright (1706) =

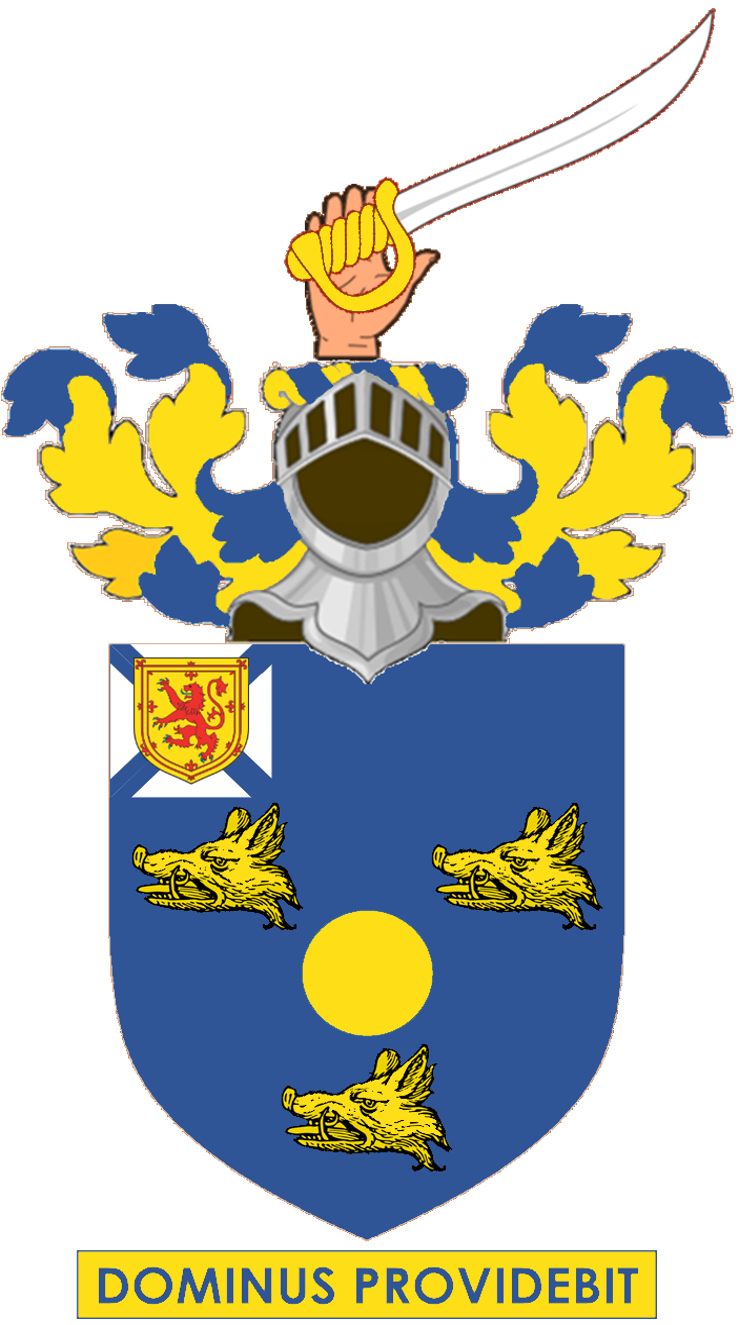
Coats of arms of the Gordon baronets of Earlston

The Gordon baronetcy of Earlston, Kirkcudbrightshire, was created in the Baronetage of Nova Scotia for William Gordon of Afton, son of William Gordon of Earlston, a Covenanter. He was an army officer, a soldier of fortune under Frederick I of Prussia who took part in Monmouth's Rebellion and the Williamite Wars. He was succeeded by his elder brother Alexander Gordon of Earlston.

== Gordon of Earlston, Kirkcudbright (1706) ==
- Sir William Gordon, 1st Baronet, of Earlston (1654–1718)
- Sir Alexander Gordon, 2nd Baronet (1650–1726)
- Sir Thomas Gordon, 3rd Baronet (1685–1769)
- Sir John Gordon, 4th Baronet (1720–1795)
- Sir John Gordon, 5th Baronet (1780–1843)
- Sir William Gordon, 6th Baronet (1830–1906)
- Sir Charles Edward Gordon, 7th Baronet (1835–1910)
- Sir Robert Charles Gordon, 8th Baronet (1862–1939)
- Sir John Charles Gordon, 9th Baronet (1901–1982)
- Sir Robert James Gordon, 10th Baronet (born 1932)
