= Gordon baronets of Letterfourie, Sutherland (1625) =

Escutcheon of the Gordon baronets of Letterfourie

The Gordon baronetcy of Gordonstoun was created on 28 May 1625 in the Baronetage of Nova Scotia for Robert Gordon of Gordonstoun, fourth son of Alexander Gordon, 12th Earl of Sutherland. It was until 1908 the premier baronetcy in Scotland.

== Gordon baronets of Gordonstoun, then Letterfourie ==
- Sir Robert Gordon, 1st Baronet (1580–1656), MP for Inverness-shire in 1630. He was a courtier in the service of James VI and then Charles I of Great Britain, MA of the University of Cambridge in 1615.
- Sir Ludovick Gordon, 2nd Baronet (1624 – c. 1685), MP for Elgin & Forresshire
- Sir Robert Gordon, 3rd Baronet FRS (1647–1704), MP for Sutherland
- Sir Robert Gordon, 4th Baronet (1696–1772), MP for Caithness 1715–1722
- Sir Robert Gordon, 5th Baronet (c.1738–1776)
- Sir William Gordon, 6th Baronet (died 1795)
- Alexander Gordon of Letterfourie (1715–1797), did not assume the title, which was dormant until 1806
- Sir James Gordon, 8th Baronet (1779–1843)
- Sir William Gordon, 9th Baronet (1803–1861)
- Sir Robert Glendonwyn Gordon, 10th Baronet (1824–1908)

The baronetcy, which was created with remainder to all male descendants, became dormant 24 March 1908. It is not considered extant by the Official Roll of the Baronetage.
