= Sir Robert Gordon, 3rd Baronet =

Scottish courtier and politician

Sir Robert Gordon, 3rd Baronet (1647–1704) was a Scottish courtier and politician.

== Life ==
Born 7 March 1647, was the eldest son of Sir Ludovick Gordon, 2nd Baronet of Gordonstoun in Drainie, Elginshire, by his first wife Elizabeth, daughter and coheiress of Sir Robert Farquhar of Mounie in Daviot, Aberdeenshire; his grandfather was Sir Robert Gordon, 1st Baronet. He travelled in continental Europe, learning mechanics and chemistry.

Gordon represented Sutherland in the Scottish Parliament of 1672–74, sat in the convention of 1678, in that of 1681–82, and again in 1685–86. He was knighted in 1673 and succeeded to the baronetcy in September 1685. James II made him a gentleman of his household, and took an interest in his scientific inventions.

On 3 February 1686, Gordon was elected Fellow of the Royal Society. He died in 1704.

== Works and legacy ==
In April 1687 Gordon communicated to the Royal Society, by the king's command, Receipt to cure Mad Dogs, or Men or Beasts bitten by Mad Dogs (Phil. Trans. xvi. 298). The year after his death his widow erected a mausoleum to his memory on the site of the old church of Ogston, immediately to the east of the mansion of Gordonstoun. An underground chamber at Gordonstoun was shown as his laboratory, and he lived in popular traditions of the neighbourhood as "Sir Robert the warlock".

== Family ==
Gordon was twice married:

1. On 23 February 1676, to Margaret, widow of Alexander Sutherland, 1st Lord Duffus, and daughter of William Forbes, 11th Lord Forbes. She died in April 1677, leaving a daughter.
2. To Elizabeth, only daughter of Sir William Dunbar, bart., of Hempriggs, Wick; they had a family of three sons and four daughters. He was succeeded in the baronetcy by his eldest son Sir Robert Gordon, 4th Baronet.

== Notes ==
Attribution

This article incorporates text from a publication now in the public domain: Stephen, Leslie; Lee, Sidney, eds. (1890). "Gordon, Robert (1647-1704)". Dictionary of National Biography. Vol. 22. London: Smith, Elder & Co.

Baronetage of Nova Scotia
Preceded by Ludovick Gordon	Baronet (of Gordonstoun) c.1685–1704	Succeeded by Robert Gordon
