= Mingulay Boat Song =

1930s song by Hugh S. Roberton

The "Mingulay Boat Song" is a song written by Sir Hugh S. Roberton (1874–1952) in the 1930s. The melody is described in Roberton's Songs of the Isles as a traditional Gaelic tune, probably titled "Lochaber". The tune was part of an old Gaelic song, "Òran na Comhachaig" (the 'Creag Ghuanach' portion); from Brae Lochaber. The song describes fishermen sailing homeward to the isle of Mingulay where their families wait.

== Lyrics ==
Roberton's lyrics are as follows:

Hill you ho, boys; Let her go, boys;
Bring her head round, now all together.
Hill you ho, boys; Let her go, boys;
Sailing home, home to Mingulay.

What care we though white the Minch is?
What care we for wind or weather?
Let her go boys! ev'ry inch is
Wearing home, home to Mingulay.

Wives are waiting on the bank, or
Looking seaward from the heather;
Pull her round boys! and we'll anchor,
Ere the sun sets at Mingulay.
