= Gordon baronets of Dalpholly, Sutherland (1704) =

Escutcheon of the Gordon baronets of Dalpholly

The Gordon baronetcy of Dalpholly, Sutherland was created on 3 February 1704 in the Baronetage of Nova Scotia for William Gordon, son of Sir Adam Gordon, Member of the Parliament of Scotland for Sutherland. The title was also known as Gordon of Invergordon.

== Gordon of Dalpholly, Sutherland (1704) ==
- Sir William Gordon, 1st Baronet (died 1742), MP for Sutherlandshire 1708–1713 and 1714–1727 and Cromartyshire 1741–1742
- Sir John Gordon, 2nd Baronet (c.1707–1783), MP for Cromartyshire 1742–1747 and 1754–1761
- Sir Adam Gordon, 3rd Baronet (died 1817), Rector of West Tilbury in Essex
- Sir George Gordon, 4th Baronet (died 1840)
- Sir Adam Gordon, 5th Baronet (died 1850)
