= Sir Home Gordon, 12th Baronet =

Sir Home Gordon in 1908

Sir Home Seton Charles Montagu Gordon, 12th Baronet Gordon of Embo, Sutherland (30 September 1871 – 9 September 1956 at Rottingdean, East Sussex) was a journalist and author who was best known for his writing on cricket. He contributed regularly to the magazine The Cricketer as well as writing numerous books on the subject.

== Life and career ==
After completing his schooling at Eton College in 1887, he became a journalist and writer and subsequently a publisher, at one time being the sole proprietor of Williams & Norgate Ltd. In addition to his own books, he contributed to annuals for county cricket clubs and also wrote for the Encyclopædia Britannica.

He was known on cricket grounds all over the country, recognisable by the red carnation that he always wore. His memories of cricket went back as far as 1878, when as a small boy he was taken to the Gentlemen of England v. the Australians match at Prince's Cricket Ground. He first went to Lord's in 1880, when he met W. G. Grace. Later that season he watched the first Test match to be played in England, at The Oval. He attended no fewer than seventy of the annual Oxford v. Cambridge games. He watched every Test match at Lord's from the first one in 1884 to the one in 1956, shortly before he died. He was an enthusiastic statistician but a somewhat inaccurate one, a fact noted by Plum Warner in Sir Home's obituary in The Cricketer.

He was friends with such great figures of the game as K. S. Ranjitsinhji, with whom he drove in a silver coach to the Delhi Durbar, Lord Hawke and Lord Harris. He collaborated with the latter two in editing the Marylebone Cricket Club's (MCC) Memorial Biography of W. G. Grace. He was the inaugural President of the London Club Cricket Conference from 1915 to 1919, chairman of the Sports Conference in 1919, and held practically every honorary position for Sussex, being their President in 1948.

When young he played for MCC amateur sides, but never played first-class cricket. However, for his services to Sussex, he was given a county cap, an old one belonging to A. E. R. Gilligan.

Outside cricket, he held a post at the Air Ministry in 1918 and was a member of the Committee of National Alliance of Employers and Employed from 1918 to 1919.

Gordon succeeded to the Baronetcy when his father died in 1906.

== Family ==
Gordon married, firstly, in 1897, Edith Susan Leeson-Marshall (died 1945), daughter of Richard John Leeson-Marshall, of Callinafercy House, County Kerry. He married, secondly, in 1953, Katharine Hornsby, daughter of John Hornsby of Rottingdean.

As Gordon had no children from either of his two marriages, the title, created by King Charles I in 1631, became extinct with his death.

== See also ==
- Gordon baronets

== Sources ==
- Haigh, G. (ed.) (2006) Peter the Lord's Cat, Aurum Books: London. ISBN 1 84513 163 0.

== Bibliography ==
- Initiation Into Literature, Émile Faguet & Sir Home Gordon (translator), Williams And Norgate (London), 1912.
- The Memorial Biography of Dr. W. G. Grace, Lord Hawke, Lord Harris, Sir Home Gordon - eds., Constable, 1919.
- That Test Match, Duckworth & Co, 1921 (a novel).
- Cricket Form at a Glance in This Century, Duckworth, 1924.
- Eton v. Harrow at Lord's, Sir Home Gordon (ed.), Bernard Darwin, Stanley Baldwin (intro.), Williams and Norgate, 1926.
- Cricket Form at a Glance for Sixty Years: 1878-1937, Arthur Barker Ltd. (London), 1938.
- Background of Cricket, Arthur Baker Ltd. (London), 1939.
- Sussex County Cricket, Convoy Publications, 1950.

Baronetage of Nova Scotia
Preceded by Home Gordon	Baronet (of Embo); 1906–1956	Extinct
