= Sir Patrick Dunbar, 3rd Baronet =

Scottish politician

Sir Patrick Dunbar, 3rd Baronet (c. 1676–1763), of Bowermadden, and Northfield, Caithness, was a Scottish politician who sat in the British House of Commons from 1727 to 1734.

Dunbar was the eldest son of Sir Robert Dunbar, 2nd Baronet, of Northfield and his wife Mary Sinclair, daughter of Patrick Sinclair of Ulbster, Caithness. He married Catherine Sinclair, daughter of William Sinclair of Dunbeath, Caithness, in 1697. She died and he married secondly Catherine Brodie, daughter of Joseph Brodie of Milntown, Moray in 1722.

Dunbar was returned as Member of Parliament for the alternating seat of Caithness by John Sinclair of Ulbster, the hereditary sheriff, after a contest at the 1727 general election. He voted consistently with the Administration. There was no election at Caithness in 1734 but he was defeated at the 1741 general election.

Dunbar succeeded to the baronetcy on the death of his father in 1742. He died on 5 April 1763. He had two sons by each of his marriages, but they all predeceased him. He had three daughters by his second marriage. He was succeeded by Sir Archibald Dunbar, 4th Baronet.

His daughter Margaret Dunbar was second wife to Rev James Oswald minister of Methven and Moderator of the General Assembly of the Church of Scotland in 1765.

Parliament of Great Britain
Preceded by Sir Robert Gordon, Bt	Member of Parliament for Caithness; 1727–1734	Succeeded by Alexander Brodie
Baronetage of Nova Scotia
Preceded by Robert Dunbar	Baronet (of Northfield); 1742-1763	Succeeded by Archibald Dunbar
