= Gordon baronets of Embo, Sutherland (1631) =

Escutcheon of the Gordon baronets of Embo

The Gordon baronetcy of Embo, Sutherland, was created on 18 June 1631 for John Gordon, son of John Gordon a prominent landowner.

== Gordon baronets of Embo, Sutherland (1631) ==
- Sir John Gordon, 1st Baronet (died 1649)
- Sir Robert Gordon, 2nd Baronet (died 1697)
- Sir John Gordon, 3rd Baronet (died 1701)
- Sir William Gordon, 4th Baronet (died 1760)
- Sir John Gordon, 5th Baronet (died 1779)
- Sir James Gordon, 6th Baronet (died 1786)
- Sir William Gordon, 7th Baronet (1736–1804)
- Sir John Gordon, 8th Baronet (died 1804)
- Sir Orford Gordon, 9th Baronet (died 1857)
- Sir William Home Gordon, 10th Baronet (1818–1876)
- Sir Home Seton Gordon, 11th Baronet (1845–1906)
- Sir Home Seton Charles Montagu Gordon, 12th Baronet (1871–1956)

The 12th Baronet was recorded in 1943 as having no heir. The baronetcy was extinct or dormant on 9 September 1956 with his death. No heir was known by 1971, and the Official Roll counts it as extinct.
