= Arnamul =

Arnamuil (Gaelic)
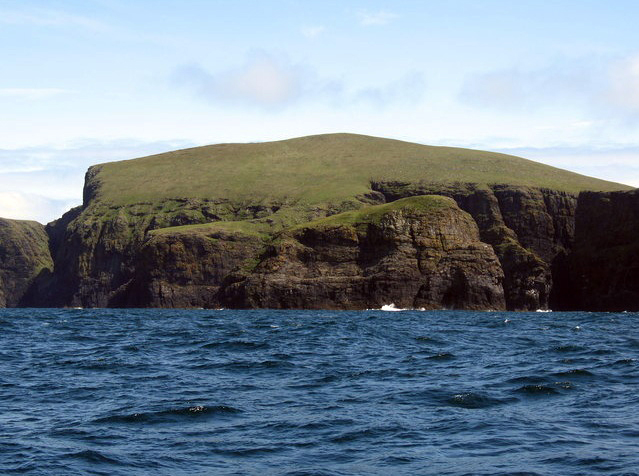
- The western cliffs of Mingulay with Arnamuil in the centre

Location
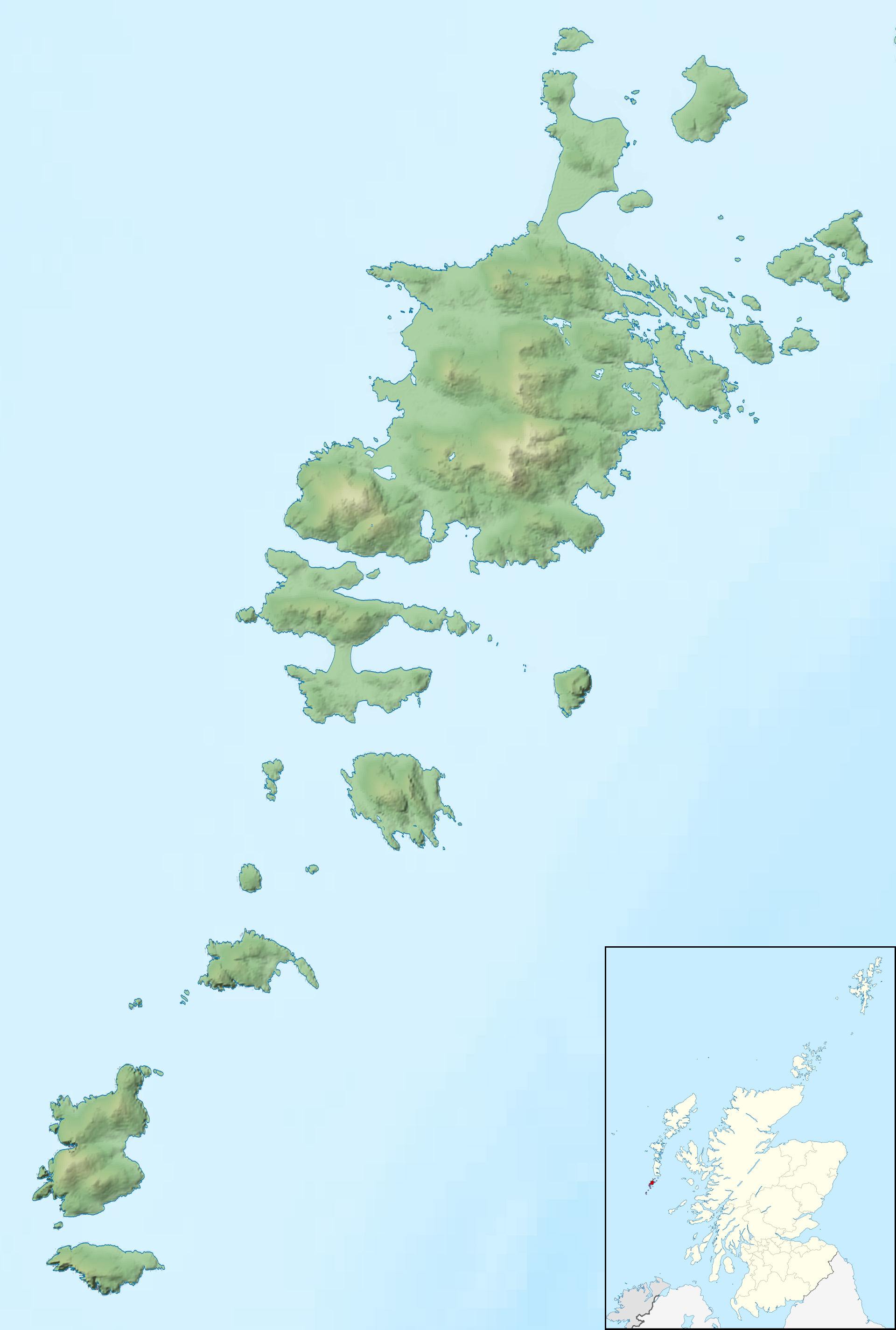
- Arnamul shown within the Bishop's Isles Arnamul shown within the Outer Hebrides
- OS grid reference: NL545825
- Coordinates: 56.806°N 7.662°W

Name
- Name meaning: Norse for "erne mound"
- Old Norse name: Arnamul

Physical geography
- Island group: Uists and Barra
- Highest elevation: 121 metres (397 ft)

Administration
- Council area: Na h-Eileanan Siar
- Country: Scotland
- Sovereign state: United Kingdom

Demographics
- Population: Unpopulated

Arnamul (Scottish Gaelic: Arnamuil) is a stack off the west coast of Mingulay in the Western Isles, Scotland. Although precipitous, sheep were grazed on its relatively flat summit during the human occupation of Mingulay.

Haswell-Smith (2004) states that the name means "erne mound". Mac an Tailleir (2003) does not provide a derivation, although he quotes "Arnabol" as meaning "eagle farm" or "Arne's farm" from the Norse.

It was ascended by a party of hill baggers in April 2018.
