= Sir Robert Gordon, 4th Baronet =

Scottish landowner and politician

Sir Robert Gordon, 4th Baronet (1696–1772) was a Scottish landowner and politician who sat in the House of Commons from 1715 to 1722.

Gordon was the eldest son of Sir Robert Gordon, 3rd Baronet of Gordonstoun and his second wife Elizabeth Dunbar, daughter of Sir William Dunbar, 1st Baronet of Hempriggs, Caithness. His father died in 1704 and he succeeded to the baronetcy. His mother married secondly James Sutherland afterwards Dunbar who was Member of Parliament for Caithness from 1710 to 1713.

Gordon was elected MP for Caithness at the 1715 general election. As the constituency was only represented in alternate parliaments, there was no election in 1722, and Gordon never stood again.

Gordon married Agnes Maxwell, eldest daughter of Sir William Maxwell, 4th Baronet., of Calderwood, Lanark on. 26 April 1734 and had four sons and one daughter. He died on 8 January 1772 and was succeeded by his son Robert.

Parliament of Great Britain
Preceded by No representation Previously Sir James Dunbar, Bt	Member of Parliament for Caithness; 1715–1722	Succeeded by No representation after Sir Patrick Dunbar, Bt
Baronetage of Nova Scotia
Preceded by Robert Gordon	Baronet (of Gordonstoun); 1704-1772	Succeeded by Robert Gordon
