= James Oswald (moderator) =

Scottish Minister and Moderator of the General Assembly of the Church of Scotland

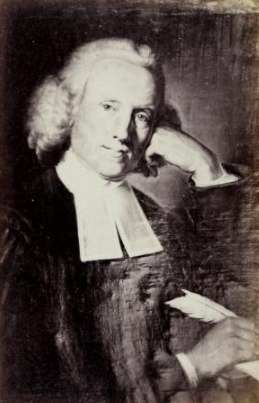
Very Rev James Oswald DD

James Oswald (1703–1793) was a Church of Scotland minister who served as Moderator of the General Assembly in 1765.

== Life ==
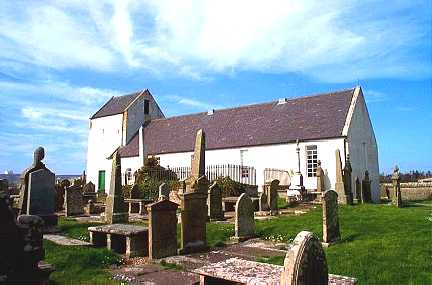
Dunnett Parish Church

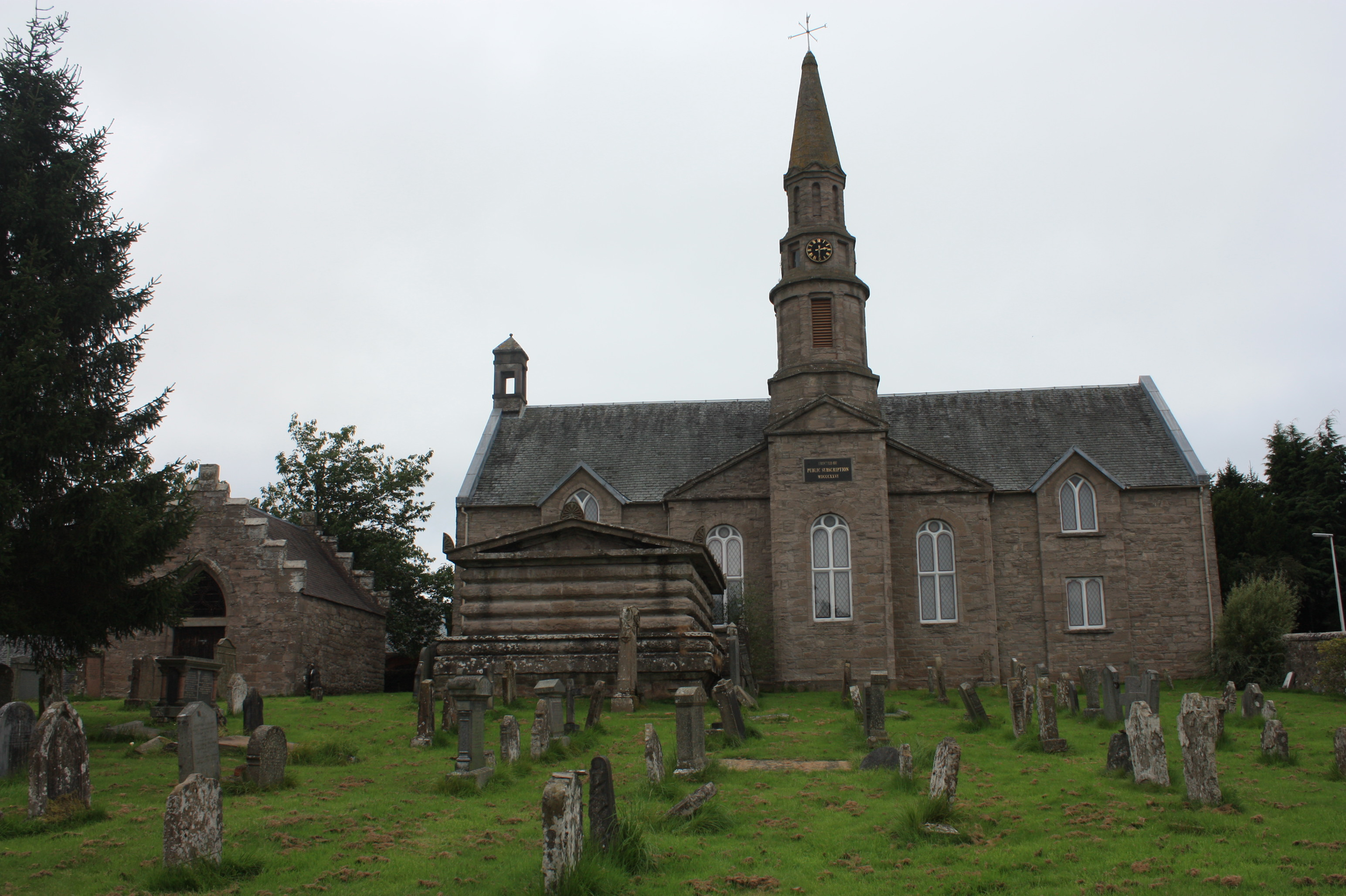
Methven Church and churchyard

He was born in the manse at the remote village of Dunnet (near John O'Groats) on 23 July 1703 the son of Rev George Oswald.

He was licensed to preach by the Presbytery of Caithness in March 1726 and ordained as minister of his home parish of Dunnet in August 1726, replacing his father who died in 1725. In December 1748 he was presented to the congregation of Methven in Perthshire by his patron David Smyth of Methven and translated to this new charge two years later in December 1750.

In 1765 he succeeded Rev Alexander Gerard as Moderator of the General Assembly of the Church of Scotland the highest position in the Scottish church. Glasgow University awarded him an honorary Doctor of Divinity later in the same year.

He retired in April 1783 and moved to Scotstoun near Glasgow. Here he was joint founder of the Glasgow Society of Sons of the Clergy. He died on 2 August 1793.<re name = fasti />

== Family ==
In January 1728 he married Elizabeth Murray daughter of James Murray of Clairden in Caithness. Their children included:

- Richard (1731–1747)
- Margaret –
- Barbara (born 1734), married William Laird of Port Glasgow
- George Oswald of Scotstoun and Auchincruive (1735–1819), Glasgow tobacco merchant, Lord Rector of Glasgow University 1797–8
- Alexander Oswald of Shieldhill (1738–1813) Glasgow merchant
- James (born 1742)
- Janet (born 1744)
- Andrew (1745–1748)

Elizabeth died in 1746 and he then (1749) married Margaret Dunbar daughter of Sir Patrick Dunbar, 3rd Baronet of Northfield. They had no further children and Margaret died in 1779.

George Oswald and his wife Margaret Smythe of Methven were portrayed by Thomas Gainsborough.

== Artistic recognition ==
He was portrayed by William Cochran.

== Publications ==
- An Appeal to Common Sense on Behalf of Religion vol. 1 (1766), vol 2 (1772)
- The Divine Efficacy of the Gospel Dispensations (1770)
