= William Gordon of Earlston =

Scottish Presbyterian elder (1614–1679)

William Gordon of Earlston (1614–1679)
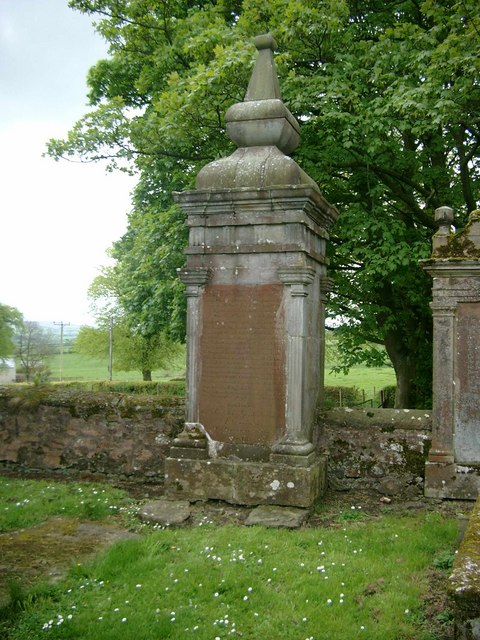
- Headstone in Glassford Graveyard

Personal details
- Born: 1614 Dalry
- Died: 1679 (aged 64–65) Crookedstane Farm, Glassford
- Denomination: Church of Scotland
- Spouse: Mary Hope 2nd daughter of Lord Craighall
- Children: 13 including Alexander Gordon of Earlston

William Gordon (1614-1679) was a Scottish landowner and Covenanter. He is remembered as being a correspondent in Samuel Rutherford's Letters and being one of the biographies in John Howie's Scots Worthies. He was regarded as a man of strong religious convictions and piety. In 1664 he was banished for listening to ministers who lacked a government licence, both at his mother's house and in the woods. He arrived at the Battle of Bothwell Bridge after the fighting was over and, hesitating to surrender, was shot.

== Life before the Restoration ==
William Gordon of Earlston was a Covenanter, born in 1614. He was the second son of Alexander Gordon of Earlston (1587-1654) and Elizabeth Gordon, his wife. His father represented the presbytery of Kirkcudbright as an elder at the General Assembly of 1638 in Glasgow. William studied for the ministry of the Church of Scotland, and graduated as master of arts. On the outbreak of the civil war in 1639 he accepted a command under General Alexander Leslie, and was present in the following year at the taking of Newcastle. After his elder brother's death he returned home to assist his now disabled father, and served on the committee for war of the Stewartry of Kirkcudbright, from whom he presented a petition to parliament in 1648. During the Commonwealth he took part in Glencairn's insurrection in Scotland in 1653 on behalf of Charles II; but, disgusted by the animosities which prevailed in Glencairn's army, he withdrew, and, taking advantage of an act of indemnity issued by Cromwell in 1654, surrendered and returned home. That he lived quietly under Cromwell's administration is shown by his appointment on two commissions in 1656 and 1659 for raising taxation in his stewartry.

Gordon was a man of eminent piety. His tenants were bound by their leases to observe family worship and other duties of religion. He went at their head to church every Sabbath day. His skill in solving cases of conscience is remarked by Wodrow in his Analecta.

== After the Restoration ==
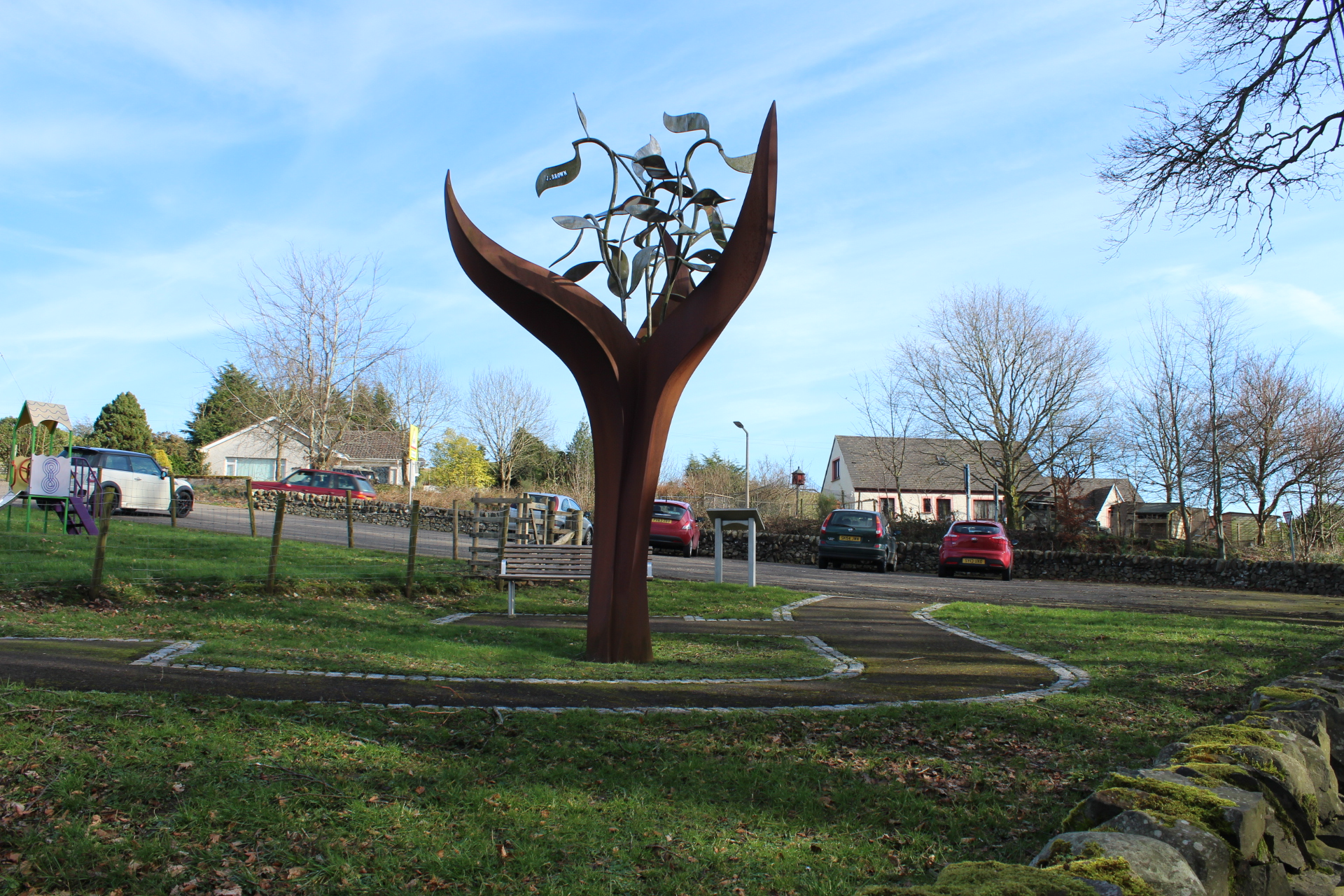
William and Alexander Gordon's names are on one of the leaves of The Dalry Covenanter Sculpture

Along with his presbyterian brethren Gordon hailed with delight the Restoration of Charles II. Owing to his strict adherence to his religious principles he was exempted from the act of indemnity granted by Charles in 1662 until he should pay a large fine of £3,500; while about the same time he and a number more were pursued by James, earl of Queensberry, to pay their shares of the damage sustained by that earl in a raid which they had made in 1650 upon his Drumlanrig Castle. In 1663 Gordon was required by the commissioners of the privy council then in the district, as patron of the church of Dalry, to present an episcopal curate to the charge, and their letter was sent by the hand of the curate himself. Gordon, in a letter which Wodrow has printed in his 'History', declined to force any one upon the people contrary to their wishes.

For this "seditious carriage" he was called before the privy council, but they do not appear to have found that his conduct amounted to a punishable crime, and therefore, on the 24 November 1663, he was summoned upon the more comprehensive accusation of keeping conventicles and private meetings in his house; and, a little more than three months later on 1 March of 1663/4 — until the year 1751, England did not mark the change in year until March 25, so March 1 was still "1663" on the English calendar and 1664 on the Gregorian calendar and in some nations where the Julian calendar was still in effect — Gordon was found guilty, upon his own confession, of having been one at three several conventicles, when Mr. Gabriel Semple, a deposed minister, preached — one in Corsack wood, and two in the wood of Airds; of hearing Mr. Robert Paton, likewise a deposed minister, expound a text of Scripture, and perform divers acts of worship in his mother's house; and of allowing Mr. Thomas Thomson, another of the same kind, to lecture in his own house to his family on a Sabbath day — for these offences, and because he would not engage never to repeat them, he was banished forth of the kingdom, not to return under pain of death. This was in March 1664. A month was allowed him to make his preparations, during which he was ordained to live peaceably and orderly under a penalty of £10,000, or enter himself in prison. He went to London, but after the Pentland Rising, of which he had disapproved, was suppressed, he was permitted to return home. His house at Earlston was frequently made a barrack for the troops employed in hunting down the covenanters, and he himself had to construct a secret and safe hiding-place in the depths of the forest of Aird.

== Bothwell Bridge ==
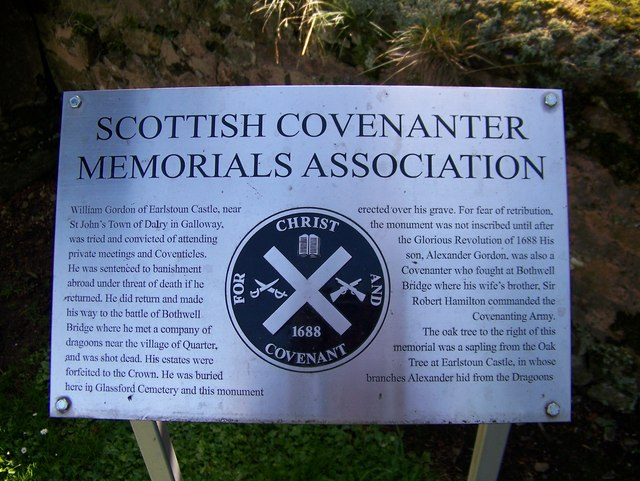
Plaque at William Gordon's Grave

Gordon fully approved the rising which ended in the battle of Bothwell Bridge on 22 June 1679. He was hindered from being present at the fight, but, coming up after it was over, fell into the hands of a detachment of dragoons, who demanded his surrender. He hesitated for a moment, and was immediately shot dead. His body was secured, and buried by his sister-in-law, the wife of Sir John Harper of Cambusnethan, in Glassford churchyard, Lanarkshire, where a plain pillar was erected to mark the spot of interment. This monument has since been restored with an inscription. He was some time after death cited before the privy council, and sentence of forfeiture and death was passed upon him.

== Family ==
Gordon was survived by his widow, Mary Hope, second daughter of Sir John Hope, lord Craighall, who with great difficulty succeeded in retaining her life-rent right in the estates. They were married on 26 October 1648, and had issue thirteen children, most of whom died young, only three sons and one daughter reaching maturity. The sons were:

- (1) Alexander Gordon of Earlston;
- (2) Sir William Gordon of Afton, who was a lieutenant-colonel under the Duke of Marlborough, and for his services at the revolution was created a baronet of Nova Scotia on 9 July 1706
- (3) John, a surgeon in the army.

Their daughter, Margaret, married James Holborn of Menstrie, Clackmannanshire in 1682.

== Fiction ==
S.R. Crockett's Men of the Moss Hags tells the story of the Gordons of Earlstoun. Published in 12 serial instalments in Good Words Magazine, it was subsequently published by Isbister in 1895. William's namesake, William Gordon, is the hero of the story. A sequel, Lochinvar was serialised in The Christian World Magazine and published by Methuen in 1897. Both novels were international bestsellers.

== Bibliography ==
- McKerlie's Hist. of the Lands and their Owners in Galloway, iii. 415–18
- Wodrow's Church History, ed. Burns, i. 369–412, ii. passim, iii. 108
- Acts of the Parliaments of Scotland, vols. vi. and vii.
