= Gordon baronets of Lesmore, Aberdeen (1625) =

Escutcheon of the Gordon baronets of Lesmore

The Gordon baronetcy of Lesmore, Aberdeenshire was created on 2 September 1625 in the Baronetage of Nova Scotia for James Gordon, son of Alexander Gordon.

== Gordon baronets of Lesmore, Aberdeen (1625) ==
- Sir James Gordon, 1st Baronet (died c.1640)
- Sir James Gordon, 2nd Baronet (died c.1647)
- Sir William Gordon, 3rd Baronet (died c.1671)
- Sir William Gordon, 4th Baronet (died c.1684)
- Sir James Gordon, 5th Baronet (died c.1710)
- Sir William Gordon, 6th Baronet (died 1750)
- Sir Alexander Gordon, 7th Baronet (died 1782)
- Sir Francis Gordon, 8th Baronet (c.1764–1839)

The baronetcy became dormant on 9 November 1839, and Cokayne commented in 1902 that it was unlikely that it was then extinct. It does not as of 2026 appear on the Official List.

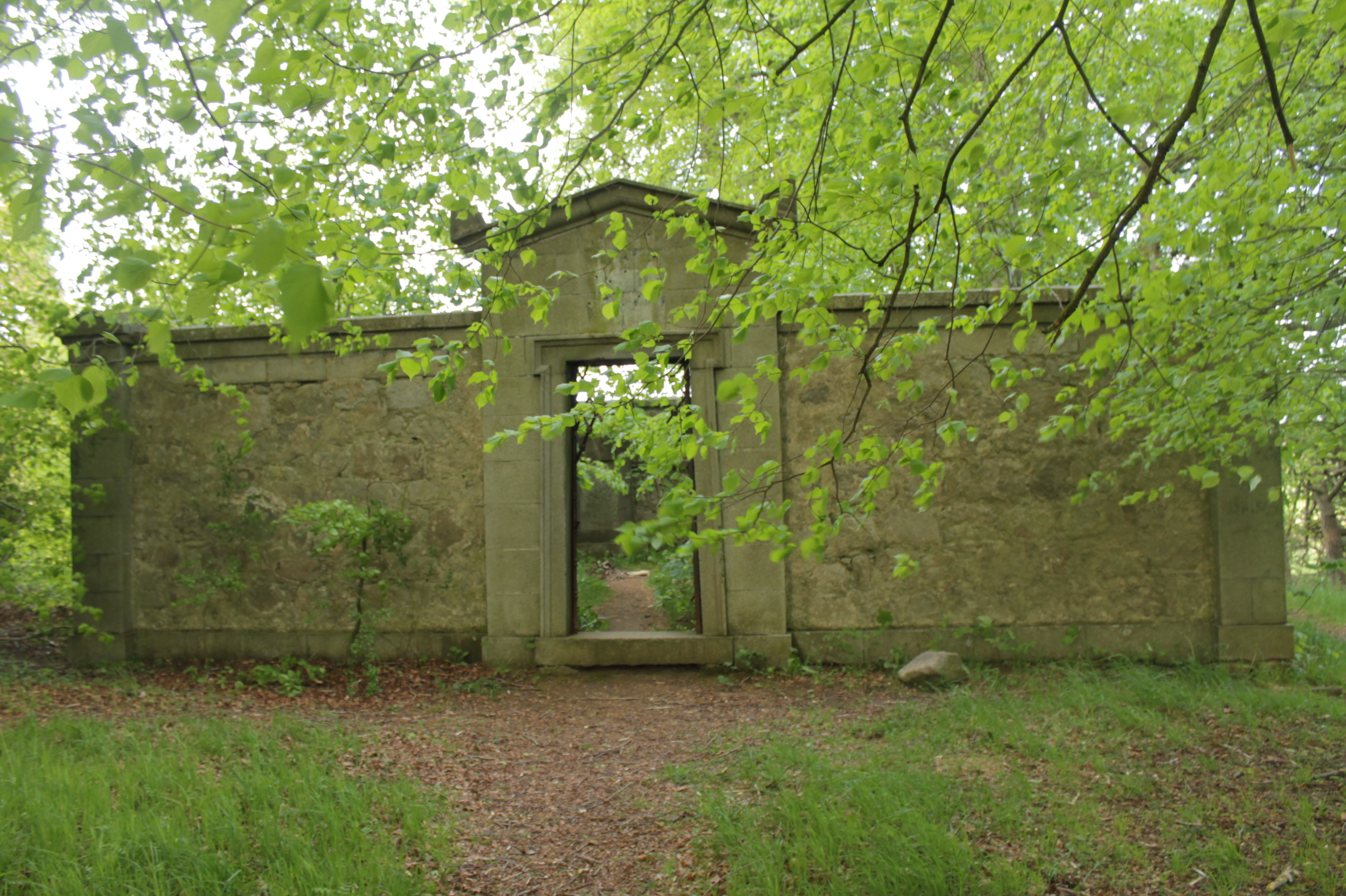
Gordon Mausoleum, River Don near Dyce
