= Cluny Castle =

Castle in Aberdeenshire, Scotland

Coordinates: 57.1983°N 2.5059°W

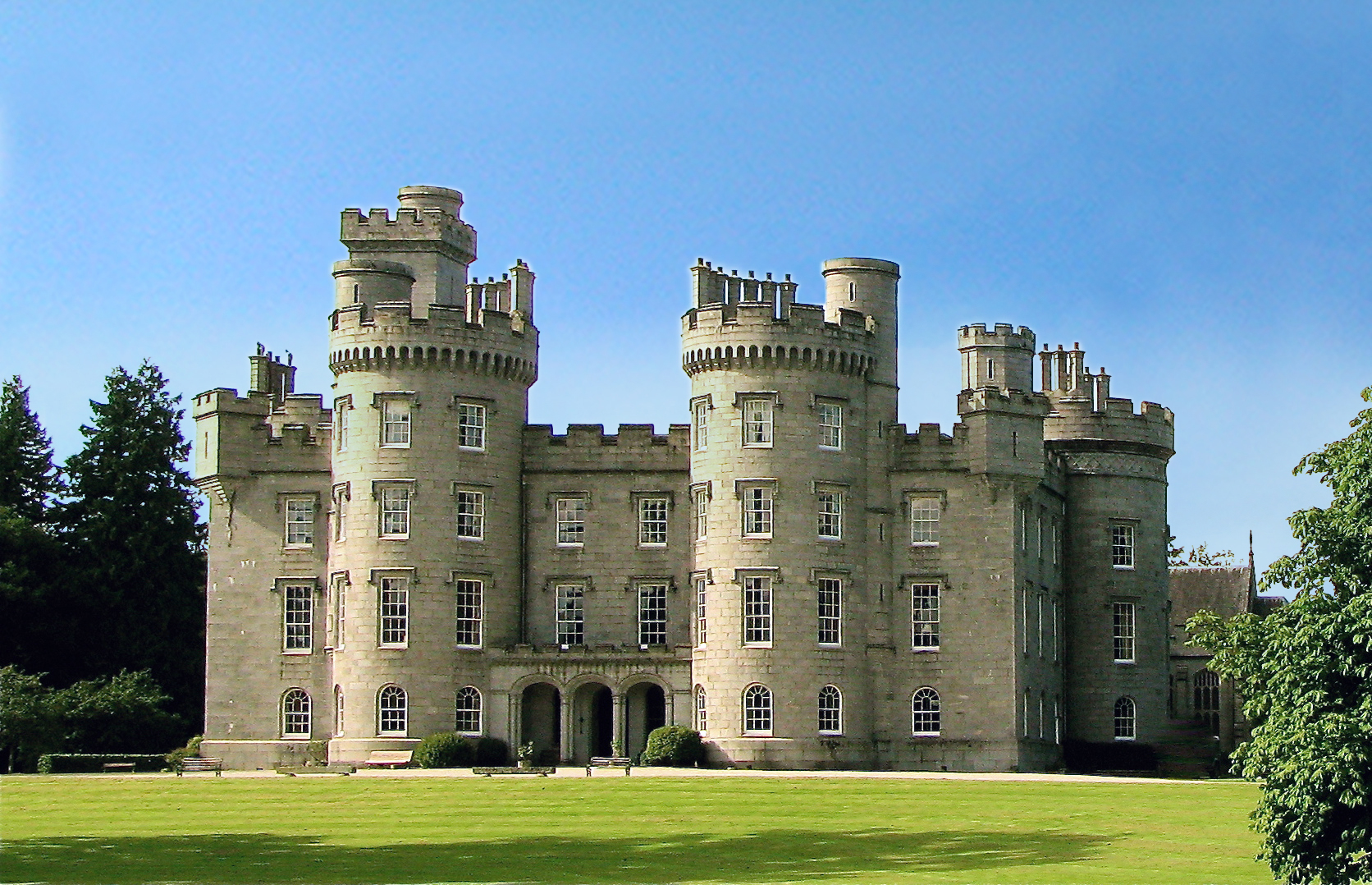
- Cluny Castle in 2014
- Interactive map of the Cluny Castle area

General information
- Location: Scotland

Technical details
- Size

Inventory of Gardens and Designed Landscapes in Scotland
- Official name: Cluny Castle
- Designated: 30 March 2006
- Reference no.: GDL00103

Cluny Castle was originally built c.1604 as a Z-plan castle replacing either a house or small peel tower. Sited in the parish of Cluny, it is south of Monymusk and north of Sauchen in Aberdeenshire, north-east Scotland. Owned by the Gordon baronets of Cluny and three separate branches of the family over the centuries, it was used to shelter Jacobite rebels in the mid-18th century. Extensive additions were made in 1820 to the design of architect John Smith when it was in the ownership of Colonel John Gordon. The private chapel, once completed in 1870, was described by the British press as "one of the first and most beautiful oratories in the kingdom". Two wings of the castle and the adjoining private chapel were destroyed by fire in 1926, but the damage was mostly restored.

It is a Category A listed building and has been used as a film setting. The grounds are included on the Inventory of Gardens and Designed Landscapes in Scotland and are described as 'Outstanding' in their Artistic and Historical Interest by Historic Scotland.

As of 2025 it remains privately owned by Cosmo Linzee Gordon of Cluny who has employed craftsmen to complete extensive renovations. It is not open to the public but corporate events are hosted there and weddings are held in the chapel.

== History ==
On an unknown date prior to 1325, King Robert the Bruce granted the lands of Cluny (Gaelic meaning meadow or "meadows interspersed with rising grounds") to his sister Mary's husband, Alexander Fraser. The lands passed down through the family, via Adam Gordon of Huntly and the Earls of Huntly, to John Gordon, a younger son of the 3rd Earl. His son Sir Thomas Gordon (d. 1607) built the castle to replace an earlier house or peel tower. (Note: Slade describes it as a house but Miller refers to a peel tower) The lands were inherited by his son, Alexander Gordon, who became the fourth laird of Cluny and the second baronet. By 1636 the cost of building the castle combined with other financial difficulties caused ownership of the lands to be transferred. The castle had various owners, probably creditors, until 1680, when it became the property of Robert Gordon, of the Gordonstoun branch of the family. It remained in the hands of this family until the mid-18th century.

The Gordons of Cluny were implicated in the Jacobite rising of 1745, and had also incurred debts. This resulted in the castle passing to a third branch of the Gordon family around 1753, although the exact date is unknown. The new proprietor John Gordon (1695–1769) was of obscure origins. He was an Edinburgh merchant as well as a factor to Cosmo Gordon, 3rd Duke of Gordon. John Gordon's son was also named Cosmo Gordon (1736–1800) and he inherited the estate on his father's death in 1769. He was a politician and co-founder of the Royal Society of Edinburgh. He did some work at the castle, although records give no indication of what was involved. Plans for a redesign were commissioned from Robert Adam in 1790 and from his business partner and younger brother James in 1793, though this work was never carried out. Predeceased by his wife, Mary Baillie, Cosmo Gordon died without issue in 1800 and was succeeded by his brother Charles, described by architectural historian H. Gordon Slade as "eccentric and excessively penurious". When Charles died on 8 May 1814, various bequests were made to his children; his eldest son John, later an army colonel and a member of Parliament, inherited Cluny and the remainder of the properties plus £30,000. No money had been spent on the estate during the years it was owned by Charles Gordon.

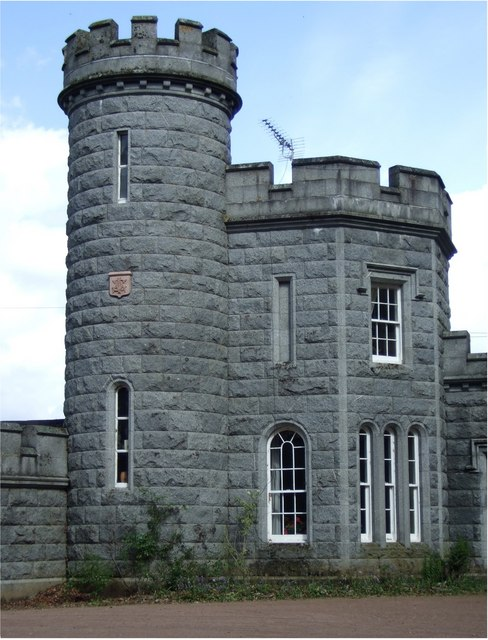
South Lodge, Cluny Castle

It was under the ownership of Colonel Gordon that extensive additions were made to the castle, commencing around 1820. He had previously inherited the estates of his uncle, a merchant in West India, and the Colonel continued to extend his fortune, purchasing additional lands including North and South Uist, Benbecula and Barra. The Colonel died in 1858; a description included in his obituaries was "the richest commoner in the northern part of the kingdom." In The Times dated 23 July 1858, his assets were estimated at between £2–3 million and it stated he was "without doubt the richest commoner in Scotland." He was unmarried but had four illegitimate children; all bar his eldest son John (c.1820–1878) predeceased him. Despite a series of litigations lasting 20 years, in 1858 the estates were inherited by his natural son John, who became an Aberdeenshire Militia captain from 29 March 1852. The captain continued the castle renovations and improved the general policies (Note: The definition of policies as used in Scots land terminology given in the OED is: "The enclosed (and often ornamental) grounds, park, or demesne land surrounding a large country house.") by additions of artificial lakes and woodland.

Captain Gordon also died without issue in 1878. Emily Pringle, his second wife, married Sir Reginald Cathcart becoming Lady Cathcart. The estates were overseen by a trust set up by Colonel Gordon (the Cluny Trust). In September 1926 a fire started in the Servants' Hall kitchens causing extensive damage to two wings of the castle and destroying the private chapel which had been intricately decorated by the notable artist Daniel Cottier. After Lady Cathcart's death in 1932, the estate passed to Captain Gordon's cousin, Charles Arthur. He adopted the name Linzee Gordon to comply with a stipulation made by Colonel Gordon in a codicil added to his will on 21 June 1852. In an earlier legal document dated 5 October 1835, the Colonel had declared that he wished his illegitimate children to inherit, but he did not intend to marry to facilitate it. The codicil ensured the family name was continued by mandating that any heirs to the estates "shall be bound and constantly obliged to bear, use and retain the surname of 'Gordon' and arms and designation of 'Gordon of Cluny' in all time after their succession to, or obtaining possession of, my said lands and estates, as their proper surname, arms and designation."

Historic Scotland listed the castle as a Category A listed building in April 1971.

== Architecture ==
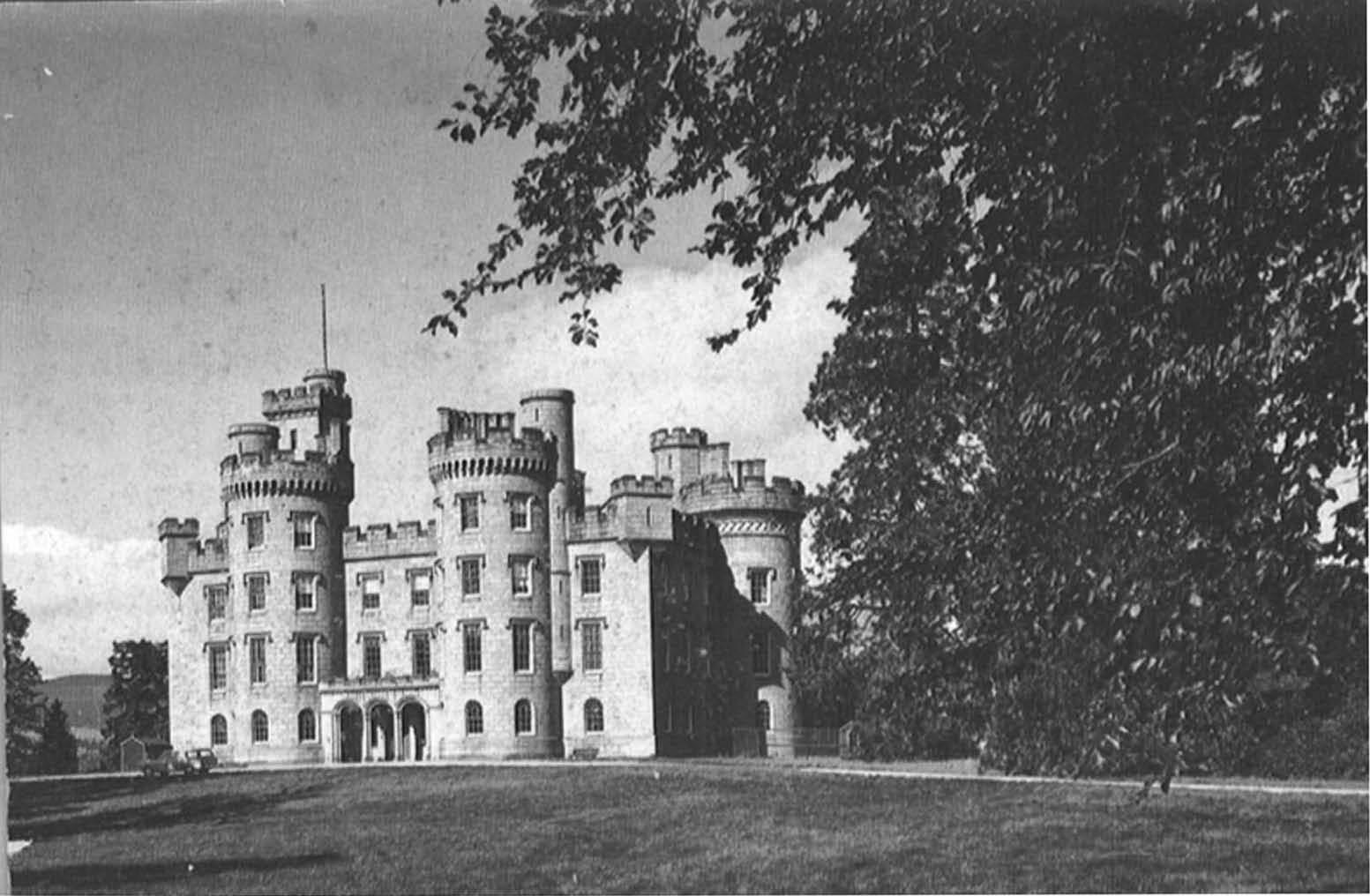
Cluny Castle pictured in 1966

Construction of the original Z-plan castle was completed in 1604; there is a commemorative stone inscribed "Thom. Gordon a Cluny miles me fecit 1604". The Master Mason Ian (John) Bell (Bel) is attributed with the construction of the original Cluny Castle and nearby Castle Fraser. MacGibbon and Ross attributed Cluny to a date earlier than 1604 and suggested it was similar in design to Claypotts Castle and would date from about the same time.

The Aberdeen City Architect, John Smith was commissioned to undertake an extensive redesign of the castle in the 1820s. Completion of the construction work spanned several years and meant the castle was unsuitable for residential use until 1832. It took until the early 1840s for the work to be finished. The old castle was cocooned in granite so it blended with the new extensions and its first floor hall became the principal dining room. A clone of the old castle was built towards the east and the two were conjoined by a new building housing the entrance hall, main stairway and gallery corridor. The drawing room and morning room were on the first floor of the replica wing. The ground fell away at the rear of the buildings and an extra basement level was added there. Circular towers arched windows with hood moulds and crenellated parapets above bold corbelling were all incorporated into the design. The pre-existing tower on the west elevation was considerably heightened by the addition of a further tall square tower above it.

Significant parts of the castle were gutted by fire in September 1926. The main house was not damaged but two wings and the chapel were consumed by flames. Restoration work was promptly undertaken – a report in the Aberdeen Journal estimated repairs would be between £60,000 to £70,000. The chapel was reconstructed to resemble its former state, minus the original artistry of Cottier (now deceased), and some remodelling of the courtyard wings was carried out. (Note: Slade gives the date of the fire as 25 September; however, the cutting from the Aberdeen Journal is dated 16 September and The Times dated 18 September 1926 also includes details of the fire.)

The later extensions were initially described by architectural historian H. Gordon Slade in 1978 as "the most shocking misuse of architectural effort and granite in the north-east of Scotland." However, in 1981, he amended his opinion stating: "The architectural qualities of the castle as John Smith redesigned it becomes much more apparent and impressive as one becomes better acquainted with them, and – once regret at the loss of the old Cluny is set aside – it is possible to accord the new Cluny the approbation that it merits." Ian Shepherd, an archaeologist, characterised it "As fantastical a baronial pile as can be found in eastern Scotland".

== Barony of Cluny ==
Cluny Castle was historically the caput baroniæ (head seat) of the feudal Barony of Cluny, one of the principal baronies in Aberdeenshire.

A distinctive feature associated with the barony is the so-called “justice stone” (sometimes referred to as the “grey stane”), situated on the estate. Unlike most feudal baronies, where judicial authority was exercised in the great hall, at Cluny tradition holds that the baron's court was convened at this outdoor stone. A King's Counsel writing for the Spalding Club described this as “almost, but not quite, unique in Scotland.”

Following the Abolition of Feudal Tenure in Scotland (Scotland) Act 2000, the barony became a dignity without legal jurisdiction but remains recognised as an incorporeal feudal title. The title continues in the Linzee Gordon family, who have maintained the estate as the historic seat.

== Twenty-first century ==
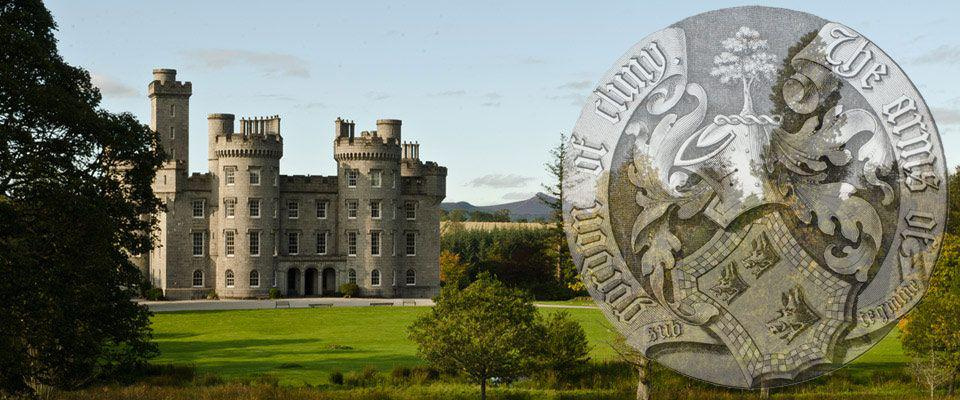
Cluny Castle with the Gordon of Cluny arms

The castle remains privately owned and was inherited by the Baron of Cluny, Cosmo Linzee Gordon, when he reached 18 years of age in 2010. Cosmo's descent from the Scottish nobility (including the Earls of Strathmore and Kinghorne), links him directly to Queen Elizabeth the Queen Mother, making him a cousin to her children, including Queen Elizabeth II.

Some scenes for the film The Queen, starring Helen Mirren, were recorded at the castle, and it has also featured on a variety of UK national television programmes. It is not open to the public although some corporate events, political gatherings, and conferences are catered for. In addition, it can be used as a wedding venue with the ceremony taking place in the private chapel, which can seat up to 100 guests. Overnight accommodation is available for the main guests at weddings.

From 2006, the policies were listed on the Inventory of Gardens and Designed Landscapes in Scotland by Historic Scotland. It is assessed as "outstanding" in the work of art category and receives a high rating in the horticultural, arboricultural and silvicultural categories due to the Wellingtonia trees planted in the 19th century.

During 2016 and 2017, substantial renovations were undertaken: the chapel was repainted; the roof and ceiling above the main staircases in the castle were replaced; turrets redecorated and drainage systems overhauled. Refurbishment work is ongoing but the majority of the restoration has been completed. The renovations have all been funded by the family estate.
