= Gordon baronets of Cluny, Aberdeen (1625) =

Escutcheon of the Gordon baronets of Cluny

The Gordon baronetcy of Cluny, Aberdeenshire, was created on 31 August 1625 for Alexander Gordon, son of Sir Thomas Gordon and his wife Grizel, daughter of James Stewart, 7th Lord Innermeath. He had served for Aberdeenshire in the Parliament of Scotland from 1612 to 1617.

== Gordon of Cluny, Aberdeen (1625) ==
- Sir Alexander Gordon, 1st Baronet (died c.1648)
- Sir John Gordon, 2nd Baronet (died before 1668)

The baronetcy became dormant on the death of the 2nd baronet, and is considered extinct.
