= John Gordon (soldier) =

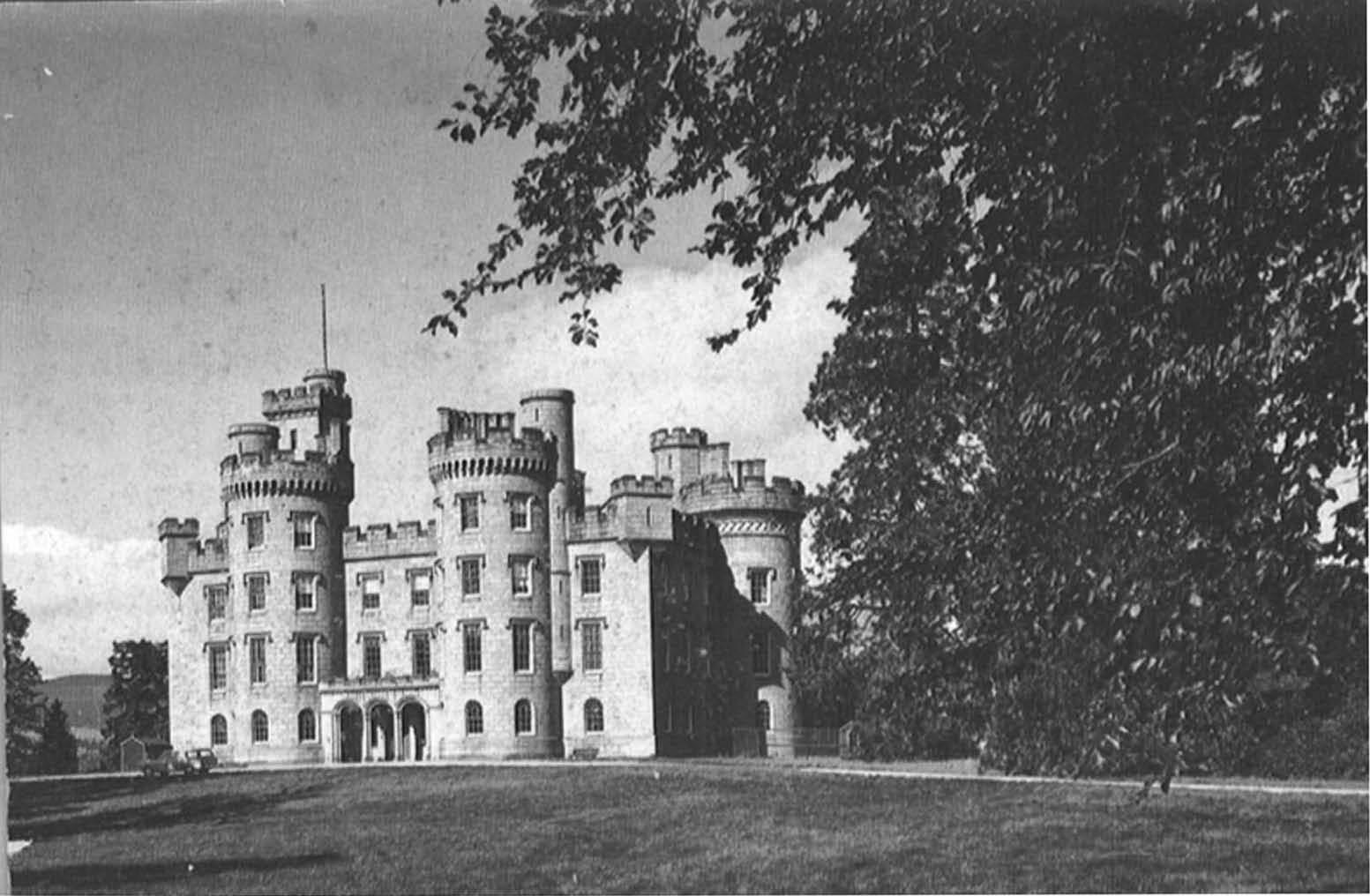
Cluny Castle (pictured here in 1966) was one of the properties inherited by Gordon in 1814.

John Gordon (c.1776 – 16 July 1858) was a Scottish soldier and Tory politician.

Gordon was the son of Charles Gordon of Braid and Cluny, Aberdeenshire, and his wife Johanna Trotter. Gordon became 2nd lieutenant in the Royal Aberdeenshire Light Infantry on 2 December 1800. He was then lieutenant in the 7th Company of the 55th Aberdeenshire Militia on 25 April 1804. In 1804 Gordon made a grand tour of Egypt, carving his name on many ancient monuments. He returned home via Gibraltar where he boarded HMS Victory, which also brought home the mortal remains of Admiral Horatio Nelson. He arrived back in England in December 1805.

Gordon became major on 11 August 1808 and lieutenant-colonel on 6 June 1820.

On the death of his father in 1814, Gordon inherited his estates including Cluny Castle; he was already a wealthy man as he also succeeded to his uncle's estate, who had been a merchant in the British West Indies. He also purchased further properties, including North and South Uist, Benbecula and Barra. He was described by architectural historian H. Gordon Slade as a "model landlord" to tenants on his Aberdeenshire properties, although he was responsible for several mass evictions of his Scottish Gaelic-speaking tenants in the Hebrides during what is now termed the Highland Clearances. Around 3,000 tenants from his estates on the Outer Hebrides were both evicted and forced to board emigrant ships to Canada in 1851 alone. After the British government introduced the Slavery Abolition Act 1833 Gordon received a compensation payment of £24,964, as his six plantations on the Caribbean island of Tobago had included 1,383 slaves.

Gordon was the Member of Parliament for Weymouth and Melcombe Regis from 1826 to 1832.

He became an Honorary Colonel in 1836.

Gordon died a bachelor without legal issue in 1858; of his illegitimate children, John Gordon of Cluny, his eldest son, was the only one to outlive him. The Cluny estate passed to his widow, Emily Gordon, who continued mass evictions and coercive emigration to Saskatchewan.

Parliament of the United Kingdom
Preceded by Fowell Buxton; William Williams; Thomas Wallace, 1st Baron Wallace; Masterton Ure	Member of Parliament for Weymouth and Melcombe Regis; 1826–1832; With: Fowell Buxton 1818–37; Thomas Wallace 1818–28; Masterton Ure 1813–32; Edward Sugden 1828–31; Richard Weyland 1831; Charles Baring Wall 1831–32	Succeeded by Fowell Buxton; Sir Frederick Johnstone, Bt
