= Emily Gordon Cathcart =

Scottish landowner (born 1845)

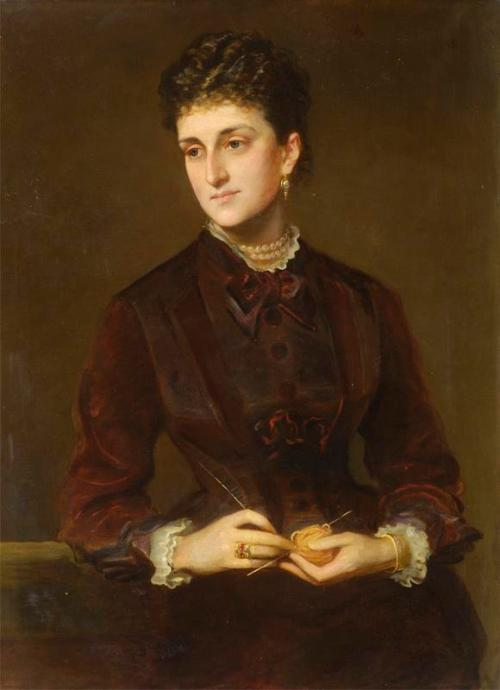
Painting from 1876

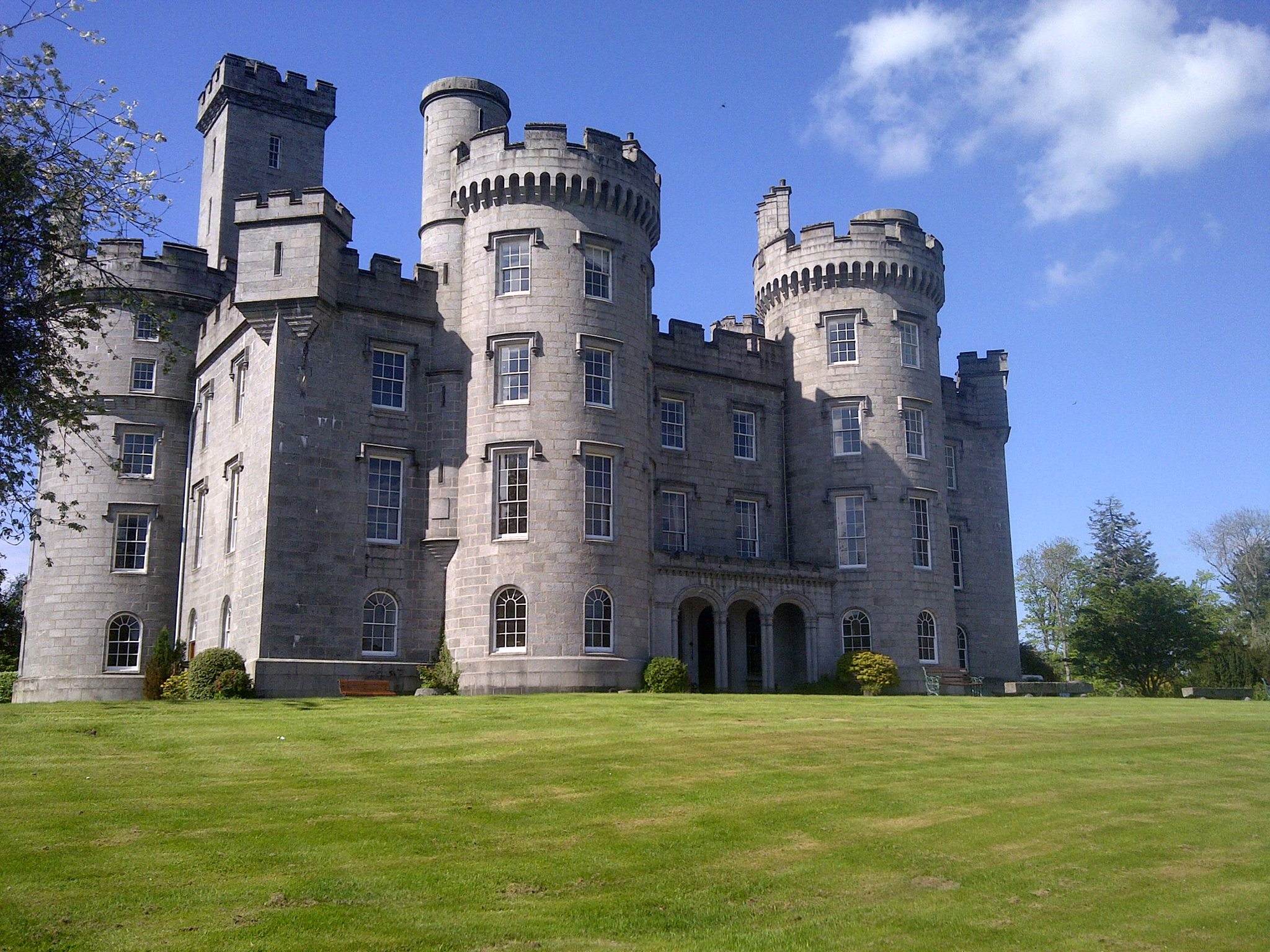
Cluny Castle in Aberdeenshire was part of the estate inherited by Lady Gordon Cathcart

Emily Eliza Steele Gordon, Lady Cathcart (née Pringle; 6 August 1845 – 8 August 1932) was a Scottish aristocrat known for her association with the Highland Clearances.

== Early life ==
Cathcart was born on 6 August 1845 at Nellore, British India, the first child of John Robert Pringle of the Madras Civil Service and Hester Helen McNeill, daughter of Gen. Malcolm McNeill, of the Madras Army, great-uncle of Lord Colonsay.

In 1847, her father died at sea when the family was traveling back from India. The following year, at Gretna Green, her mother remarried to Alexander "Lockhart" James Petty Menzies, a swindler and forger, with whom she had a son. In 1851, he was sent on the convict ship Pyrenees to Australia, where he died in 1858 falling off a horse while kangaroo hunting.

She and her younger brother were brought up by their grandfather, Sir John Pringle, 5th Baronet of Stichill, and his second wife, Lady Elizabeth Maitland Pringle, their step-grandmother, daughter of John Campbell, 1st Marquess of Breadalbane. Their grandmother was Emily, daughter of Norman MacLeod. Her brother, John, died in 1860 while at St Peter's School in York, aged 13. Both father and son are commemorated on a stained glass window erected in 1862 in the chapel at the school.

== Marriages ==
Her first marriage was in 1865 to Captain John Gordon, the illegitimate son of Colonel John Gordon, who was known as "the richest commoner in the northern kingdom". He had inherited his father's extensive assets, valued at £2-3 million in 1858, on the lower estimate equivalent to £215,000,000 in 2025. His estates included Cluny Castle, North and South Uist, Benbecula, Eriskay, and Barra.

When Captain Gordon died without legitimate issue in 1878, Emily Gordon inherited his money and estates. Her second husband was Sir Reginald Archibald Edward Cathcart (d. 1916) whom she married in late 1880 at St George's Hanover Square, London. He was the sixth baronet of Cathcart, succeeding to the title in 1878. The Cathcart family seat was Killochan Castle near Girvan in Ayrshire, but the couple lived primarily in Titness Park, Sunninghill, Berkshire.

== Highland clearances ==
Known for her anti-Catholicism, she played a leading role in the Highland Clearances as she continued the mass evictions initiated by her father-in-law. Many evicted crofters on her lands were forcibly re-settled in Regina and Wapella, in Saskatchewan, Canada, possibly due to the shares she held in the Canadian Pacific Railway.

In 1891, Lady Cathcart commissioned Old Tom Morris to design a golf course at Askernish on South Uist. She included a clause in the crofters tenancy agreements retaining the right to allow golf to be played on the land.

Lady Cathcart never lived in the highlands and is thought to have visited only once; she took ten Vatersay crofters to court in 1908 after they refused to vacate their cottages. They were sentenced to serve two months imprisonment but released two weeks early.

== Death ==
She died on 8 August 1932 at Margate in Kent. Her will included instructions for a Long Island, United States emigration fund to be set up but this was never undertaken as the trustees refused to carry it out for fear of repercussions.
