= Sutherland (Parliament of Scotland constituency) =

Constituency of the Old Parliament of Scotland

Sutherland was a constituency that returned shire commissioners to the Parliament of Scotland and to the Convention of the Estates.

Sutherland became a sheriffdom after the resignation of the heritable jurisdiction by the Earl of Sutherland on 28 June 1633.

== List of shire commissioners ==
- 1639–40: Robert Murray of Spinningdale
- 1641: Robert Murray, now laird of Pulrossie
- 1643–44: Robert Gray of Skibo
- 1645: Robert Gray of Ballone
- 1646–47: Alexander Sutherland of Duffus
- 1648: Robert Gray of Ballone
- 1649–50: Sir Robert Gordon of Embo

During the Commonwealth of England, Scotland and Ireland, the sheriffdoms of Sutherland, Ross and Cromarty were jointly represented by one Member of Parliament in the Protectorate Parliament at Westminster. After the Restoration, the Parliament of Scotland was again summoned to meet in Edinburgh.

- 1661–63: (Sir) Robert Gordon of Langdale, with Sir Robert Gordon of Embo in 1661; Embo's absence was excused in 1663
- 1669–74: Sir George Munro of Culrain and Newmore with Robert Gordon of Gordonstoun, yr 1672–74
- 1678: Robert Gordon of Gordonstoun, yr with Robert Gordon of Rogart
- 1681–82: Robert Gordon of Gordonstoun, yr with John Gordon of Embo, yr
- 1685–86: Sir Robert Gordon of Gordonstoun with Sir John Gordon of Doall
- 1689 (convention), 1689–90: (Sir) John Gordon of Embo
- 1689 (convention), 1689–1700: (Sir) Adam Gordon of Dalfolly (died c.1700)
- 1700–02, 1702–05: Alexander Gordon of Garty
- 1700–01: John Gordon the younger of Carroll
- 1702–04: David Sutherland the younger of Kinnauld

After the Act of Union 1707, Sutherland was represented by one Member of Parliament in the House of Commons at Westminster.
