= Earlstoun Castle =

Uninhabited tower house in Scotland

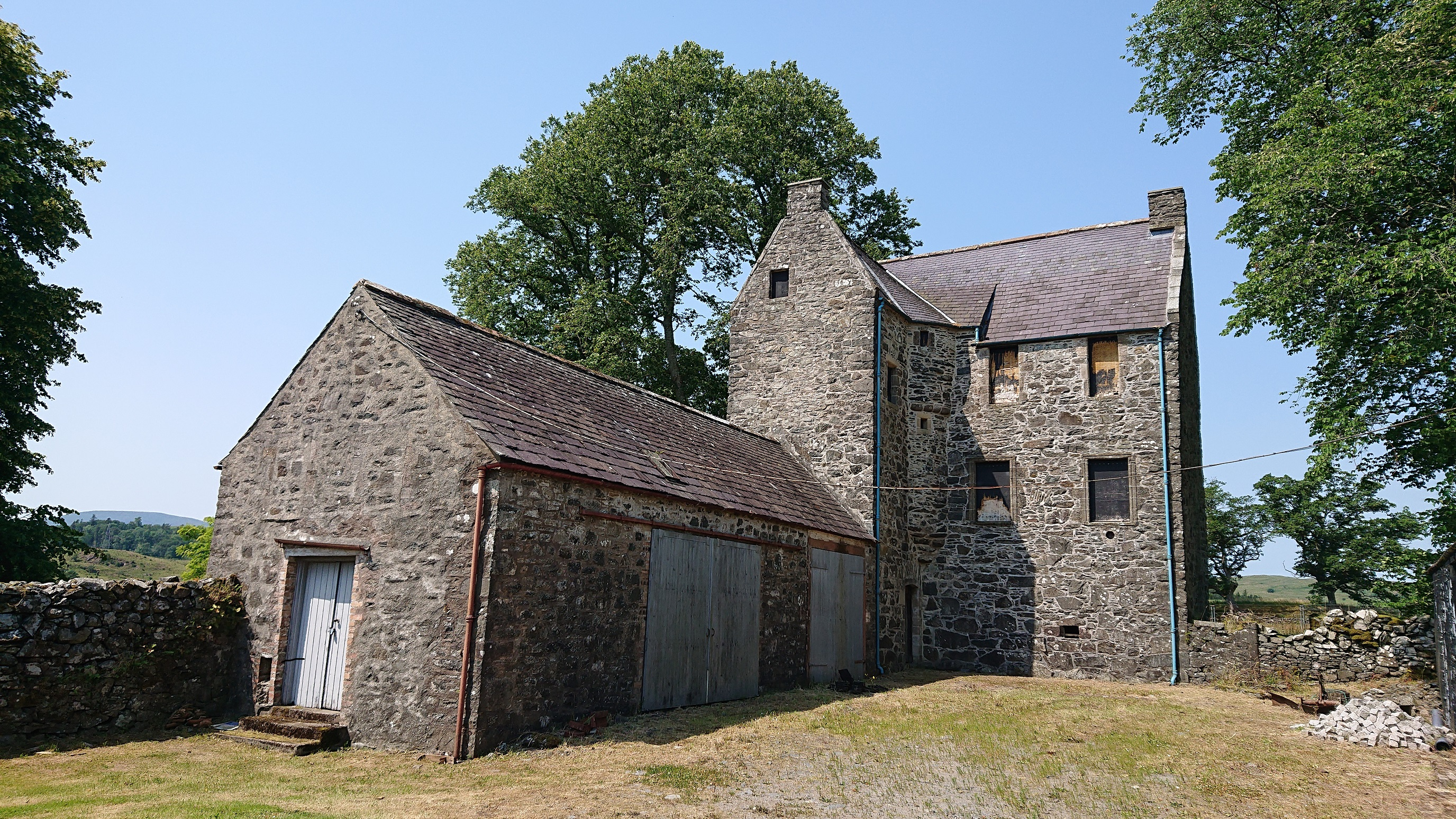
- Earlstoun Castle, viewed from the south-east

- Location of the tower within Dumfries and Galloway
- 55°07′52″N 4°10′39″W
- Type: Tower house
- Location: Near St John's Town of Dalry, Dumfries and Galloway

Scheduled monument
- Designated: 1937
- Reference no.: SM1118

Earlstoun Castle, sometimes spelled Earlston Castle, is a derelict tower house near St John's Town of Dalry in Dumfries and Galloway, Scotland. Built in the late sixteenth century, it was home to members of the Gordon family, including William Gordon of Earlston who was killed at the battle of Bothwell Bridge. It is unusual for a tower house of its age for its lack of defensive arrangements: it has no gun loops, its roof is without a parapet or corner turrets, and it lies in open ground without natural defences.

The castle was designated a scheduled monument in 1937; it was also designated a Category A listed building in 1971, but was delisted in 2017, while retaining its scheduled monument status.

A nearby ancient lightning-struck tree known as the Earlstoun or 'Covenanters' Oak is linked by local tradition to William Gordon's son Alexander Gordon of Earlstoun who is said to have hidden in this tree from government troops after his father's death.

== Description ==
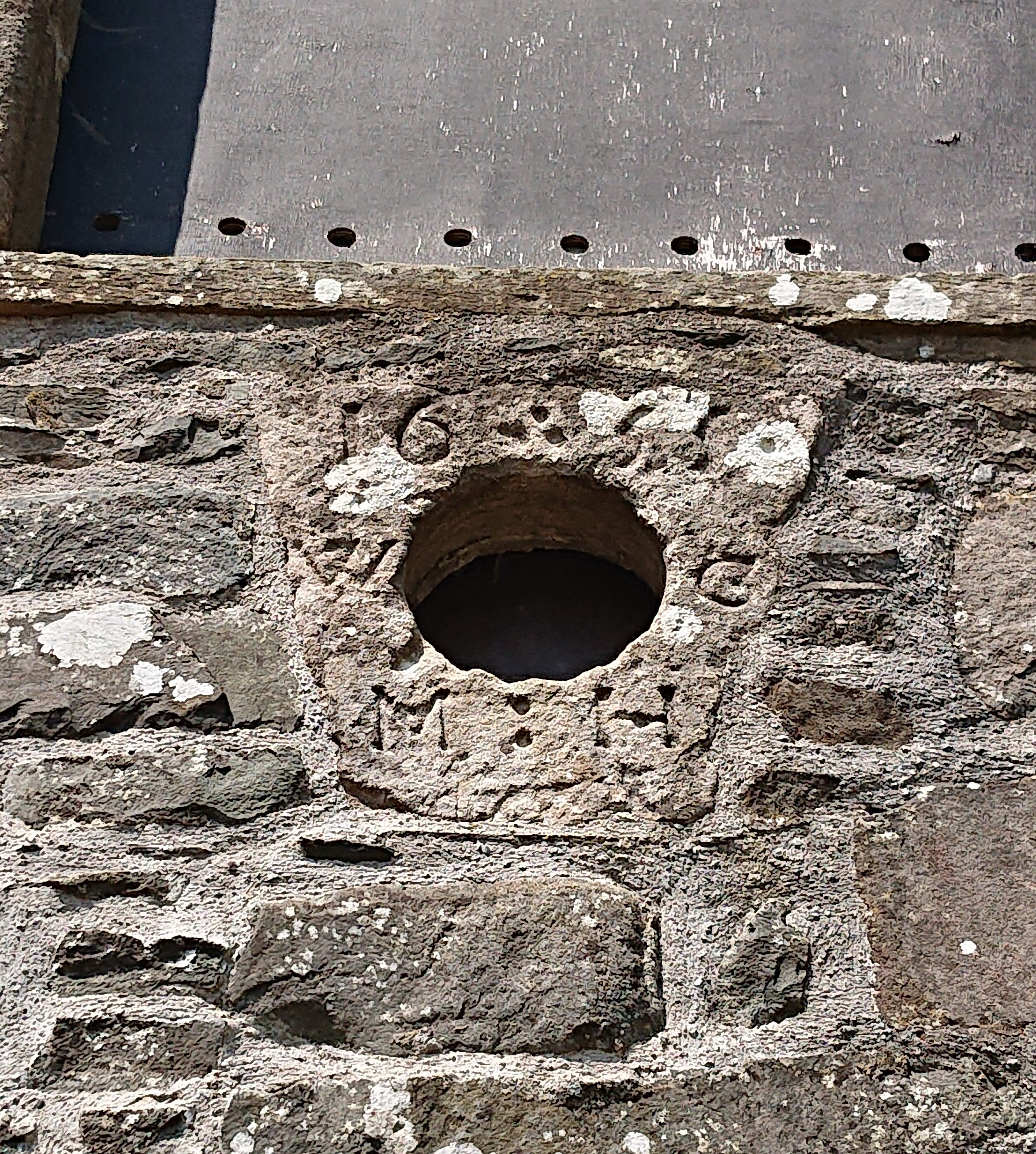
The 1655 datestone, originally part of a now-demolished extension of that date

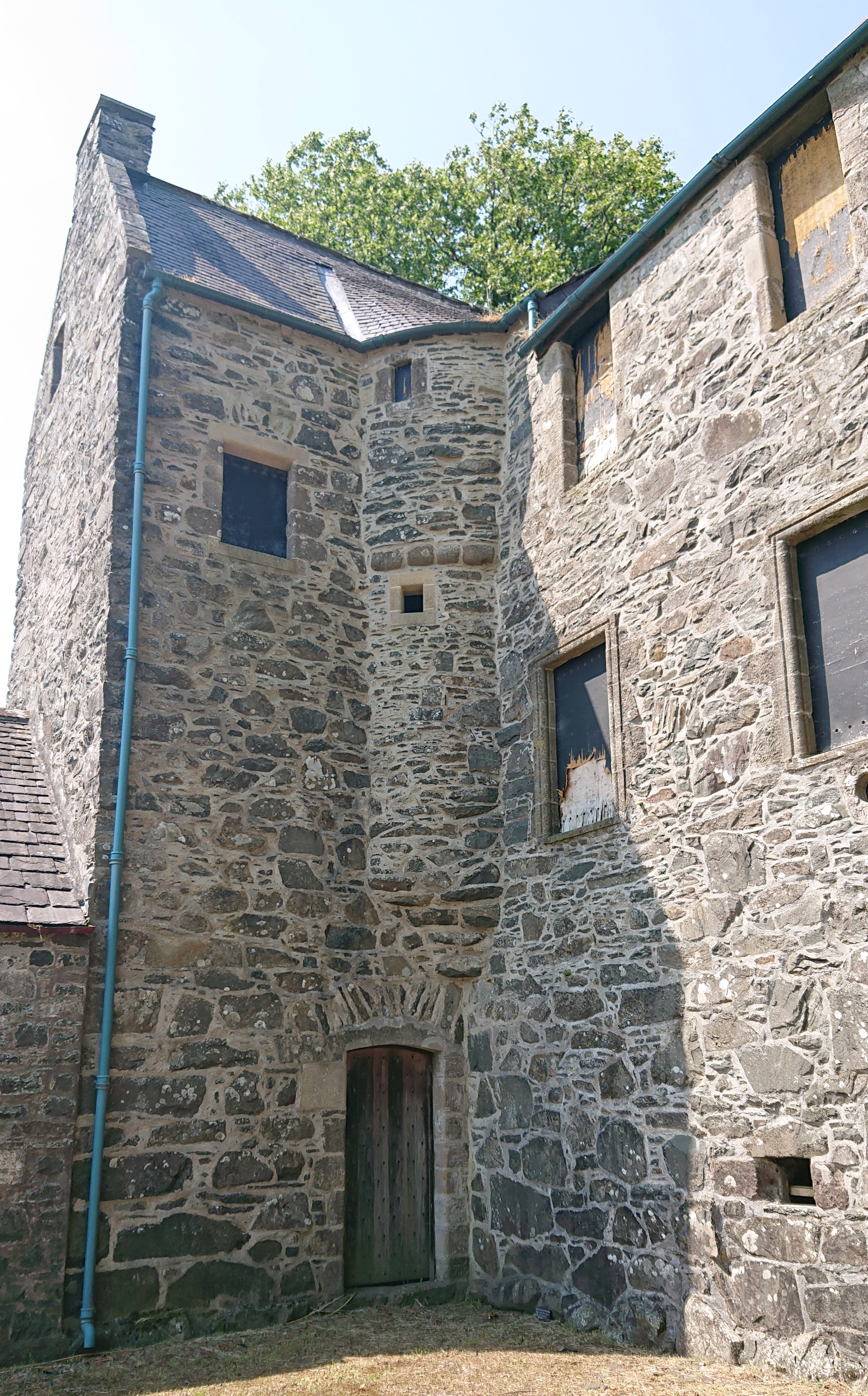
The entrance to the castle, below the corbelled stair turret.

Earlstoun Castle lies on the edge of a shallow bank in open countryside about 3 kilometres (2 mi) north of St John's Town of Dalry. It is an L-plan tower house, three storeys high with an attic above, made mostly of greywacke rubble with sandstone detailing, and a slate roof. It would originally have been harled, but the stonework is now exposed. It lacks many of the defensive features that might normally be expected on a building of its age and type, such as gun loops, a parapet and corner turrets, and its situation in open ground offers no natural protection. A single-storey farm building of the nineteenth century now abuts the tower on the south wall of the stair wing.

The ground-floor entrance to the castle is at the internal angle of the two wings, beneath a corbelled-out stair turret. This door gives access to a lobby, which connects to two barrel-vaulted cellars on the ground floor, and to the turnpike stair which leads to the upper floors.

The hall, which runs the full length of the main wing on the first floor, has large windows, and retains some of its ornate Renaissance panelling and cornicing, and a fireplace with Ionic pilasters in the north east gable wall, but these are all now in a state of considerable disrepair. The second floor of the main wing was divided into two rooms, each with a fireplace, large windows, and seventeenth-century panelling. There was also a small chamber with a fireplace and window in the stair wing, above which was a garret; both of these rooms are now missing their floors.

== History ==
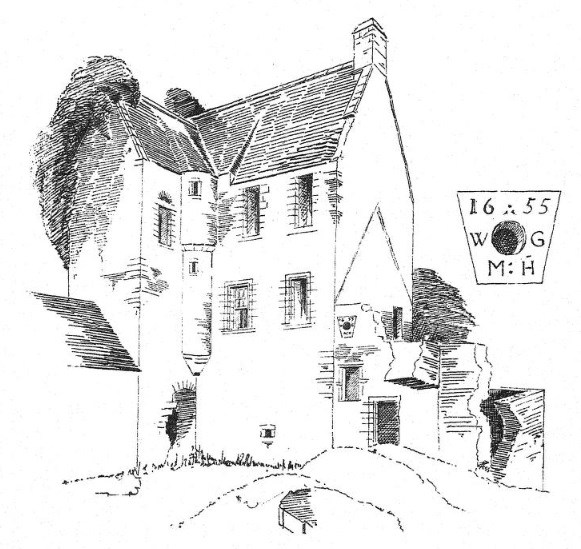
A view of Earlstoun Castle published in 1889, showing the datestone in its original location

The Earlstoun estate was bought by Sir John Sinclair of Herdmanston around 1472, and records exist of a David Sinclair and his son John living on the estate in 1536; David died shortly after this date, and the present structure was probably built by John (who was murdered around 1583) or by his son, also John. The lands passed to the Gordons in 1601, and John Gordon of Earlstoun took up residence.

The castle underwent renovations in the mid-seventeenth century. A two-storey extension was built onto the north-east wall, in which was set a stone dated 1655 with the initials WG/MH, for William Gordon of Earlston and his wife, Mary Hope. Around this time, the windows of the first floor were enlarged, the elaborate Renaissance panelling was installed in the great hall, and the arrangement of fireplaces and the orientation of some of the rooms was altered. After William Gordon was killed at Bothwell Bridge in 1679, troops were garrisoned at the castle while they suppressed the Covenanters.

The Gordons sold the estate in the 1740s, after which the castle fell into a state of disrepair. An 1845 report noted that "[w]ith some repair it might be made habitable". When MacGibbon and Ross surveyed the structure in the late nineteenth century, they bemoaned the condition it had been allowed to fall into: "It is to be regretted that this work has been allowed to fall into such a state of decay, and that within recent years, as people not yet old, who were born in the house, remember it in perfect preservation." At that time the remains of the eastern additions of 1655, including the datestone, were still standing, but they were roofless and most of the walls had been demolished; they were completely removed around 1950, but the datestone was retained and built into the eastern wall of the main block.

The castle was designated a scheduled monument in 1937, and a Category A listed building in 1971. By 1978, some of the floors had collapsed, leaving the walls improperly supported, and the owners were seeking to stabilise the structure. In 2017 its status as a listed building was removed, to avoid it having a dual designation, but it remains a scheduled monument.

== In literature ==
S.R. Crockett's 1895 novel Men of the Moss Hags recounts the story of the Gordons of Earlstoun. It was initially published in twelve serial instalments in Good Words magazine, and later in novel form by Isbister. It went on to become an international bestseller.

== See also ==
- Scottish castles
- Tower houses in Britain and Ireland

== Sources ==
- "Earlstoun Castle". Canmore. Historic Environment Scotland.
- Crockett, S. R. (1895). The men of the moss-hags : being a history of adventure taken from the papers of William Gordon of Earlstoun in Galloway and told over again. London: Isbister & Co.
- Donaldson, Islay Murray (2016). Life and Work of S.R. Crockett. Ayton Publishing (2nd edition). ISBN 9781910601143.
- Gifford, John (1996). The Buildings of Scotland:Dumfries and Galloway. London: Penguin. ISBN 0140-71067-1.
- Historic Environment Scotland. "Earlston Castle (Scheduled Monument SM1118)".
- Historic Environment Scotland. "Earlstoun Castle (Category A Listed Building LB3624)".
- Hume, John R (2000). Dumfries and Galloway: An Illustrated Architectural Guide. Edinburgh: The Rutland Press. ISBN 1-873-190-344.
- MacGibbon, David; Ross, Thomas (1889). The Castellated And Domestic Architecture Of Scotland Vol III. Edinburgh: David Douglas.
- Maxwell-Irving, Alastair M. T. (2014). The Border Towers of Scotland 2: Their Evolution and Architecture. Stirling: Alastair M. T. Maxwell-Irving. ISBN 978-1-907931-37-6.
