= Gordon baronets of Park, Banff (1686) =

The Gordon baronetcy of Park, Banffshire, was created on 21 August 1686 for John Gordon, son of Sir John Gordon of Park. The 3rd Baronet was an attainted Jacobite. The baronetcy was extinct or dormant in 1835, when the 5th baronet died.

== Gordon of Park, Banff (1686) ==
- Sir John Gordon, 1st Baronet (died 1713)
- Sir James Gordon, 2nd Baronet (died 1727)
- Sir William Gordon, 3rd Baronet (died 1751)
- Sir John James Gordon, 4th Baronet (1749–1780)
- Sir John Bury Gordon, 5th Baronet (1779–1835). He was in 1780 heir to the baronetcy, which was claimed incorrectly by Ernest Gordon, and then in 1800 by John Gordon, who died in 1804.
