= Northbay =

Village in the Outer Hebrides, Scotland

Coordinates: 57.003°N 7.433°W

Northbay: Scottish Gaelic: Am Bàgh a Tuath
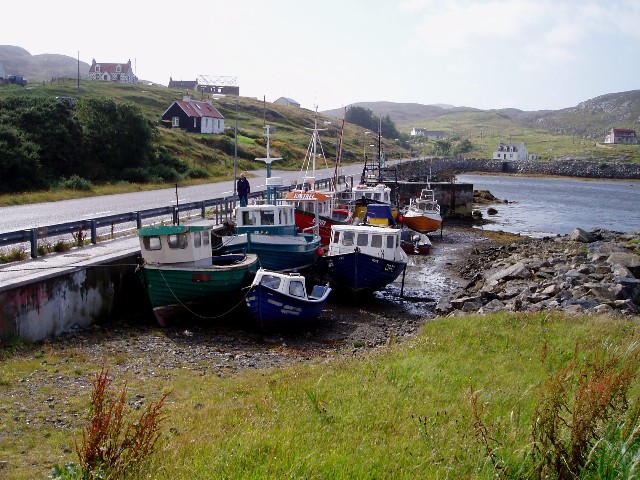
- Fishing boats at Northbay

- Location within the Outer Hebrides
- Language: Scottish Gaelic; English
- OS grid reference: NF702033
- Civil parish: Barra
- Council area: Na h-Eileanan Siar
- Lieutenancy area: Western Isles
- Country: Scotland
- Sovereign state: United Kingdom
- Post town: ISLE OF BARRA
- Postcode district: HS9
- Dialling code: 01871
- Police: Scotland
- Fire: Scottish
- Ambulance: Scottish
- UK Parliament: Na h-Eileanan an Iar
- Scottish Parliament: Na h-Eileanan an Iar

Northbay (Scottish Gaelic: Am Bàgh a Tuath) is a township and community in the north of Barra in the Outer Hebrides, off the west coast of Scotland. Northbay is within the parish of Barra.

There was a long history of settlement in the area - the Neolithic standing stones at Borve testify to this. Once the Celts arrived here from Ulster, the island spent 800 years firmly under the stewardship of the MacNeil clan engaged in feudal agriculture and fishing. When Kisimul Castle was abandoned in 1795, the clan chief came to live at Eoligarry House and remained there until Colonel Cluny bought the island from the clan in 1838.

In 1939, a tarred road finally connected Northbay with Castlebay – formerly people either walked or used the sea to ship goods to the main port. Despite being a small island, communications were before this quite bad between the north and the south. The building of the road was largely the result of a campaign by Compton Mackenzie, author of Whisky Galore! who was quite well-connected.
