= Heaval =

Hill on Barra, Outer Hebrides, Scotland

Coordinates: 56°57′58.7542″N 7°28′6.9643″W

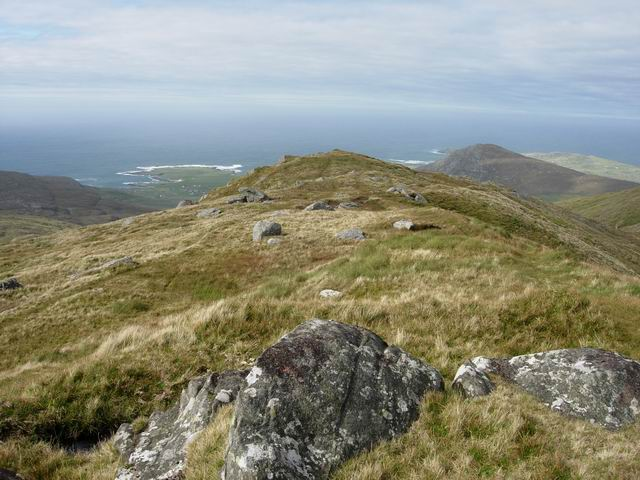
Top of Heaval, looking out into the Atlantic

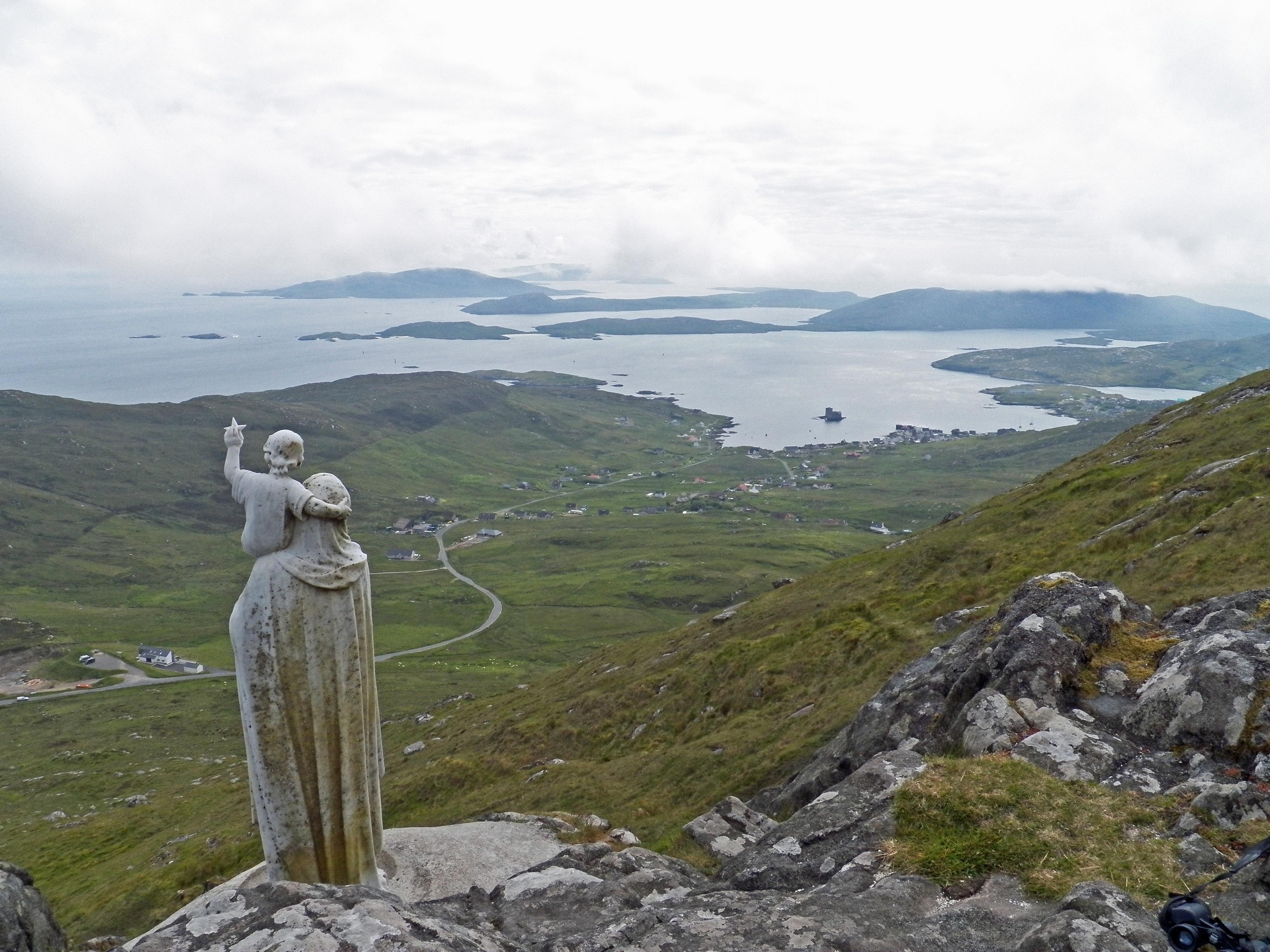
View from Heaval of Castlebay, Vatersay, Sandray, Mingulay and Pabbay

Heaval is the highest hill on the Outer Hebridean island of Barra, Scotland. The highest point is 383 metres high above sea level and it is located 1.5 km northeast of Castlebay.

It is most easily ascended from the south east, from the summit of a 102 m high road pass on the A888 about 1 km east of Castlebay. There is a signposted car park nearby. About halfway up the ridge, there is a white statue of the Virgin and Child. Near the top, the ridge becomes steep, but any difficulties can be bypassed on the south side.

The two other hills on Barra with more than 150 metres of reascent are Ben Tangaval 333 metres (1,093 ft) in the west, and Ben Cliad 202 metres (663 ft) in the north. Another hill, Theisabhal Mor (190 m) is on Vatersay, which is linked to Barra by the Vatersay Causeway.

Five of the uninhabited islands to the south have summits higher than 150 m. Weather permitting, these islands can be visited, with time for summit ascents, by arrangement with Barra Fishing Charters.
