= Isle of Barra distillery =

Gin distillery on Barra, Scotland

- Location: Castlebay, Isle of Barra, Western Isles, HS9 5XF, Scotland, United Kingdom
- Coordinates: 56.9551°N 7.4993°W
- Owner: Isle of Barra Distillers Ltd.
- Founded: 2019; 7 years ago (as gin distillery)
- Founder: Michael Morrison; Katie Morrison
- Architect: Denham Youd
- Status: Operational
- No. of stills: 1 x 300 litre gin rectifier
- Website: isleofbarradistillers.com

Isle of Barra distillery is a gin distillery and planned single malt whisky distillery on Barra, in the Outer Hebrides of Scotland. The distillery was founded in 2019 in Castlebay, the largest settlement on the island.

As of 2026, the company is constructing a second, larger distillery in order to begin production of single malt whisky. This will be the first whisky distillery on Barra. When completed, the current gin distillery will be wound down, with production moved to the new site.

== History ==
The company was established in 2016 by couple Michael and Katie Morrison. The Morrisons had lived in Glasgow for nine years before moving to Barra to launch the brand. The company received its distilling license in 2019.

In 2020, the distillery installed an additional 300 litre pot still made by Forsyths of Rothes, expanding capacity of each distilling run from 87 to 500 bottles. The still was nicknamed 'Ada', after the Morrisons' daughter.

The core gin was listed in Waitrose supermarkets in 2023 and in Sainsbury's supermarkets in 2024. Later in 2024, an office in Glasgow was opened to accommodate the company's growth.

By 2021, plans had been made for a second distillery to allow the company to produce whisky. A crowdfunding campaign was launched, which raised over £800,000 towards the estimated £12 million building cost. Planning permission was granted in 2022 for a site at Eoligarry, in the north of the island; however when construction began in December 2024, it was at Castlebay, in the south of the island. Work had been scheduled to begin in October of that year, but was interrupted when Iron Age pottery was discovered at the site.

Once opened, the future distillery will be the most westerly whisky distillery in Scotland.

== Products ==
The core product is Barra Atlantic Gin, first released in 2017. It is made using 17 botanicals. The signature botanical is Carrageen moss, which is hand-harvested on the island. Initially, it was contract-distilled in England, but production moved to the Isle of Barra in 2019. The gin's packaging won a Master award at the Design & Packaging Awards 2023.

Several other products use ingredients sourced from Barra. A limited-edition gin liqueur in 2021 was made with rhubarb grown at Gàradh a’ Bhàgh a’ Tuath, a community garden on the island, and the distillery's Hebridian Honey vodka uses honey from Bee Bharraigh.

To mark the start of construction on the future whisky distillery, Isle of Barra released two independently bottled blended whiskies: a non-age statement and a 10 year old. The recipe for the blends included ingredients sourced from Blair Athol, BenRiach and Tullibardine.

== See also ==
- List of distilleries in Scotland
