= Barra =

Island in Outer Hebrides, Scotland

Eilean Bharraigh (Gaelic); Barra (Scots)

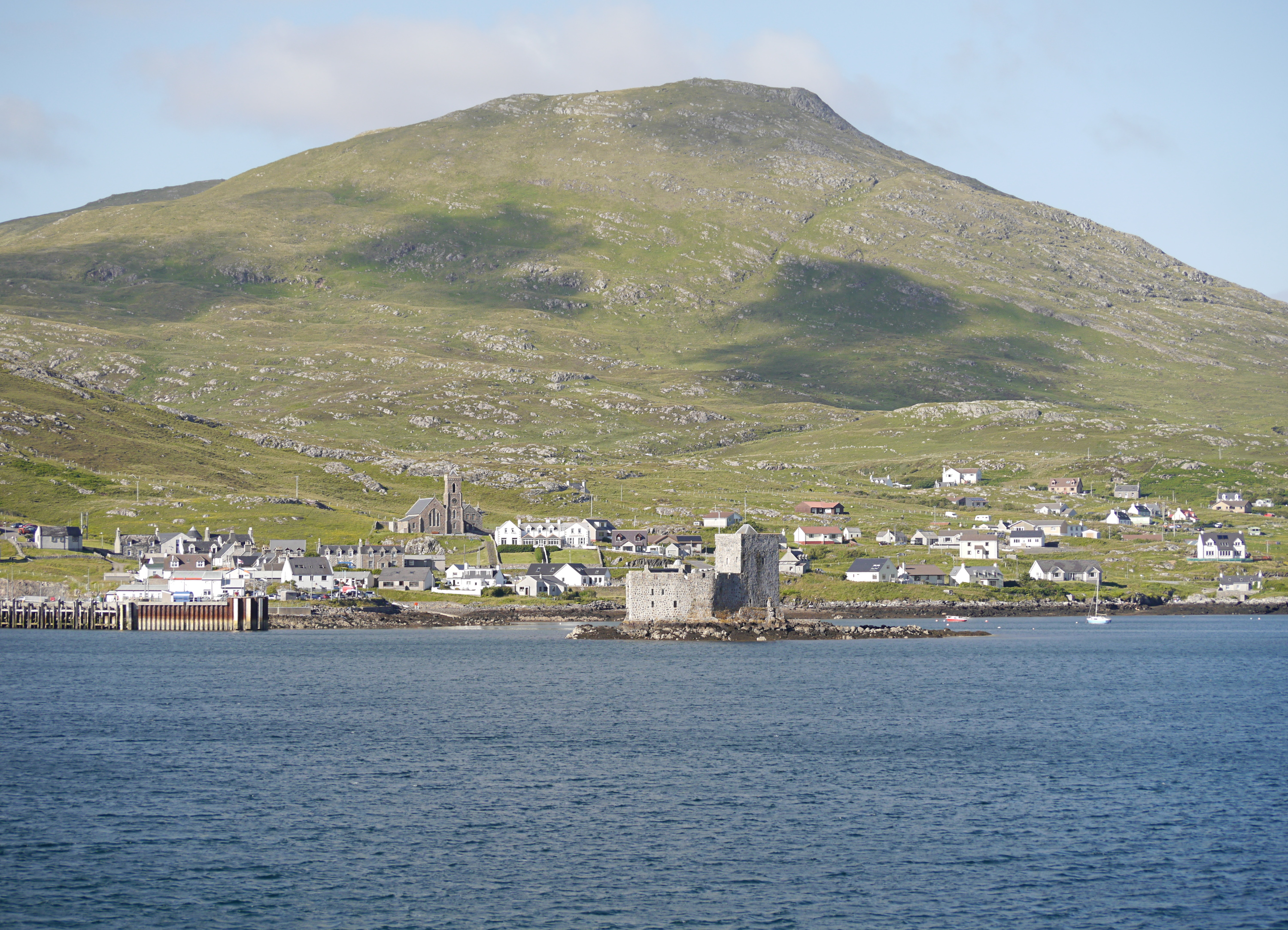
- The Village of Castlebay from the sea with Kisimul Castle in the foreground and the heights of Heaval beyond

Location
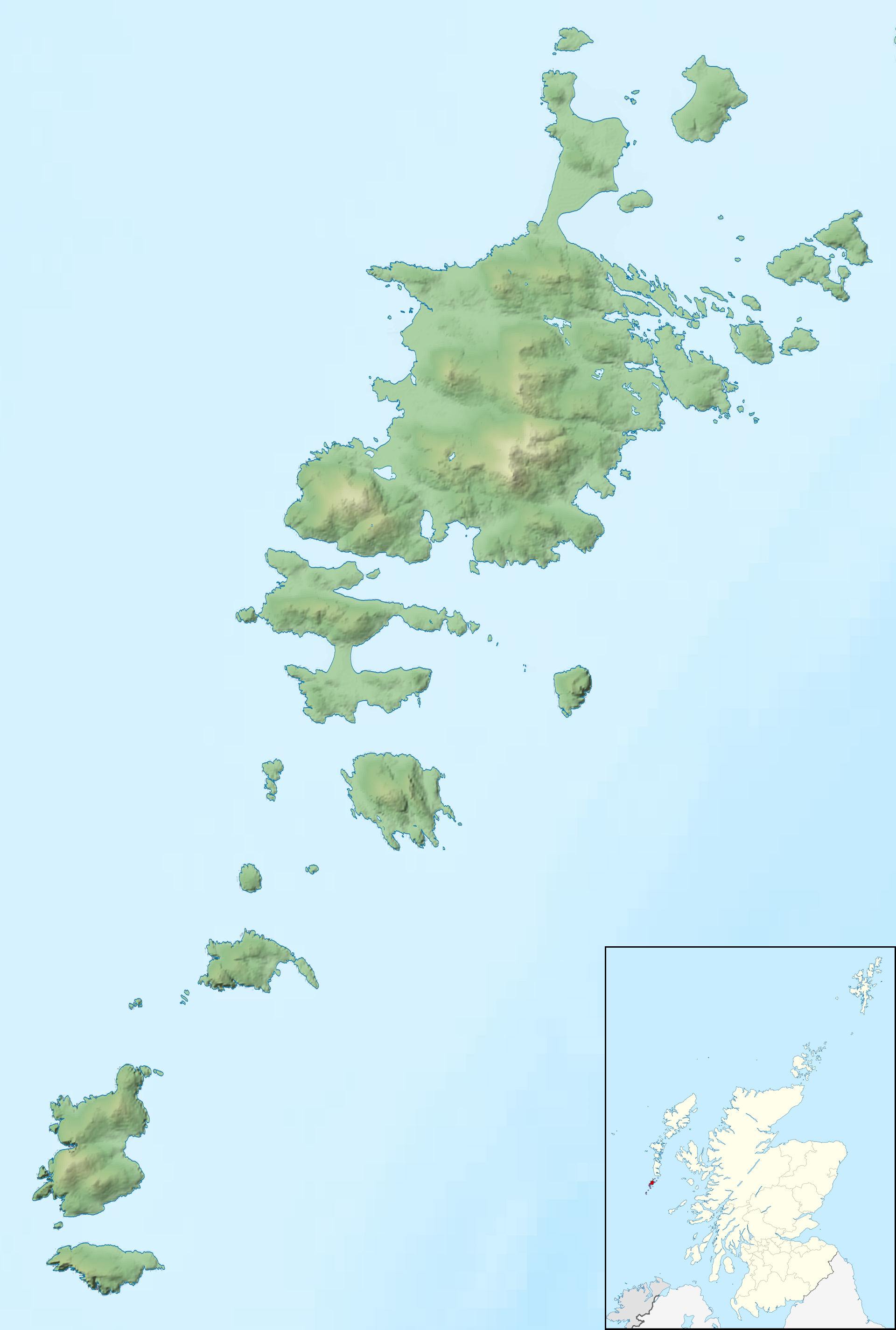
- Map of Barra & surrounding islands Barra shown within the Outer Hebrides
- OS grid reference: NF687004
- Coordinates: 56.9833°N 7.4667°W

Physical geography
- Island group: Uists and Barra
- Area: 5,875 ha (22 5/8 sq mi)
- Area rank: 20
- Highest elevation: Heaval, 383 m (1,257 ft)

Administration
- Council area: Na h-Eileanan Siar
- Country: Scotland
- Sovereign state: United Kingdom

Demographics
- Population: 1,209
- Population rank: 12
- Population density: 20.6 people/km^{2}
- Largest settlement: Castlebay

Barra (/ˈbærə/; Scottish Gaelic: Barraigh [ˈparˠaj] or Eilean Bharraigh [ˈelan ˈvarˠaj]; Scots: Barra) is an island in the Outer Hebrides, Scotland, and the second southernmost inhabited island there, after the adjacent island of Vatersay to which it is connected by the Vatersay Causeway.

In 2022, the population was 1,209, an increase of 35 since the 2011 census. English and Gaelic are widely spoken, and at the 2011 Census, there were 761 Gaelic speakers (62% of the population, falling from 76% in the 1991 census). Barra's airport is claimed to be the only one in the world to have regular scheduled flights landing on a beach. The island has been reported as being 'the most Scottish place'.

== Geography ==
Barra is roughly 60 km^{2} (23 sq mi) in area, 14 km (8.7 mi) long and 11 km (7 mi) wide. A single-track road, the A888, runs around the coast of the southern part of the island following the flattest land and serving the many coastal settlements. The interior of the island here is hilly and uninhabited. The west and north of the island has white sandy beaches consisting of sand created from marine shells adjoining the grassed machair, while the southeast side has numerous rocky inlets. To the north a sandy peninsula runs to the beach airport and Eoligarry.

== Geology ==
In common with the rest of the Western Isles, Barra is formed from the oldest rocks in Britain, the Lewisian gneiss, which dates from the Archaean eon. Some of the gneiss in the east of the island is noted as being pyroxene-bearing. Layered textures or foliation in this metamorphic rock is typically around 30° to the east or northeast. Palaeoproterozoic age metadiorites and metatonalites forming a part of the East Barra Meta-igneous Complex occur around Castlebay as they do on the neighbouring islands of Vatersay and Flodday. A few metabasic dykes intrude the gneiss in the east. The island is traversed by a handful of normal faults running WNW-ESE and by west-facing thrust faults bringing nappes of gneiss from the east. Blown sand masks the bedrock around Borve and Allisdale as it does west of Barra airport. Peat deposits are mapped across Beinn Chliaid and Beinn Sgurabhal in the north of the island.

== History ==
=== Early history ===
Human presence on Barra since the Neolithic era was established by the discovery of a near-complete pottery beaker dating from 2500 BC during the construction of a road in the 1990s. A number of stone remains were also found, including a Neolithic "work platform", which complement the several standing stones scattered around the island. In the hills to the north of Borve, there is a large chambered cairn, sited in a prominent position.

Beyond the main island, a Bronze Age cemetery is located on Vatersay, as well as an Iron Age broch; the remains of a similarly aged broch is located on the east of Barra itself. Remains of Bronze Age burials and Iron Age roundhouses were also discovered in sand dunes, near the hamlet of Allasdale, following storms in 2007 (Note: In May of that year, Channel 4's Time Team came to investigate the remains. The programme was broadcast on 20 January 2008.). Occupation of Barra continued during the later Iron Age, as evidenced by the discovery of a wheelhouse from the end of the period, which was later re-occupied between the 3rd and 4th centuries, and again in the 7th and 8th centuries.

These occupations were followed in the 9th century by Viking settlers, who gave the island the Old Norse ey ("island") part of its name. Various origins of Barr have been suggested, including the Gaelic personal name Finnbarr, the Old Norse elements berr or barr ("bare" or "rough"), and the Celtic element *barr ("top" or "peak").

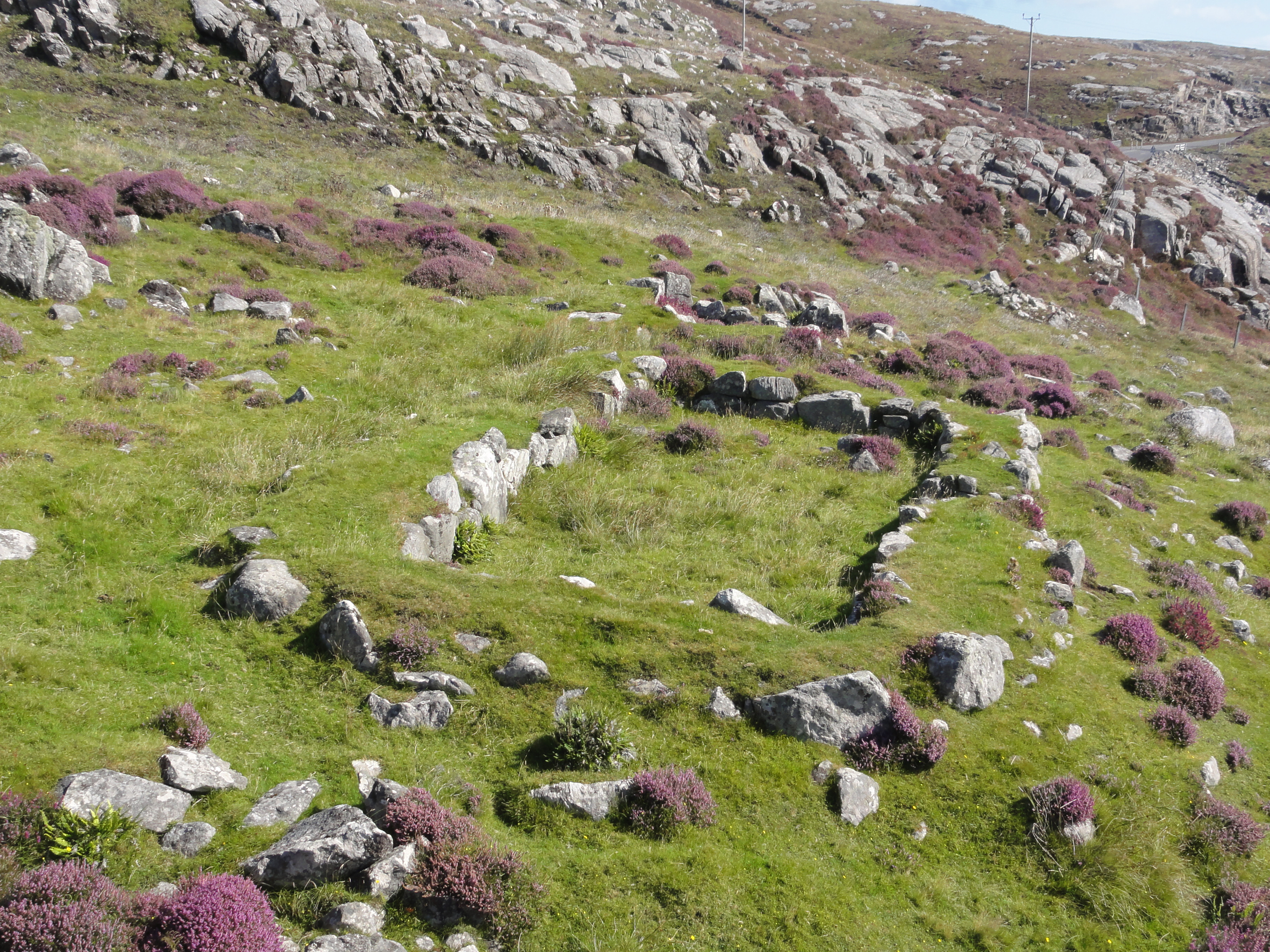
Neolithic "work platform", near Vatersay

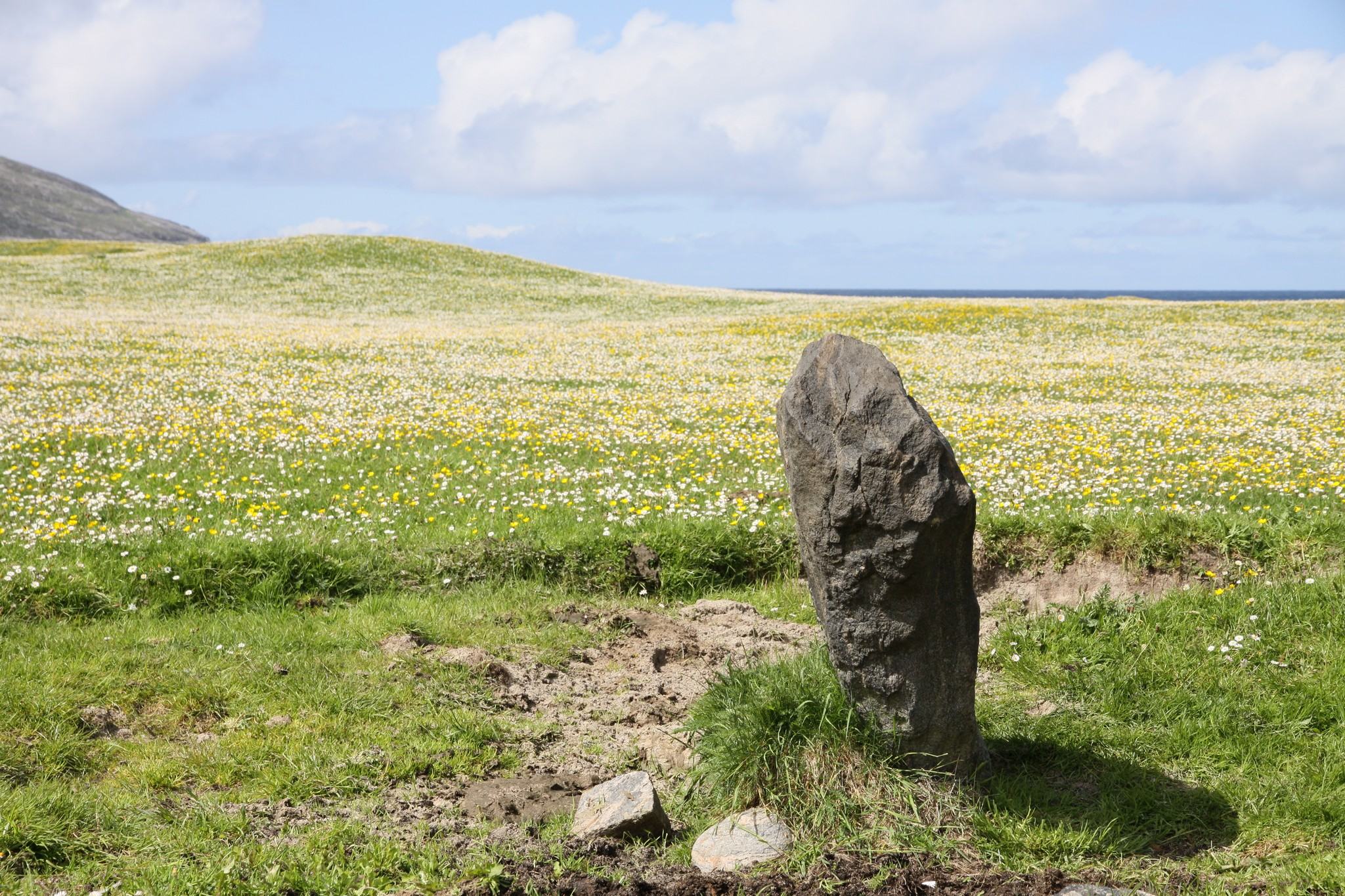
Standing stone at Borve

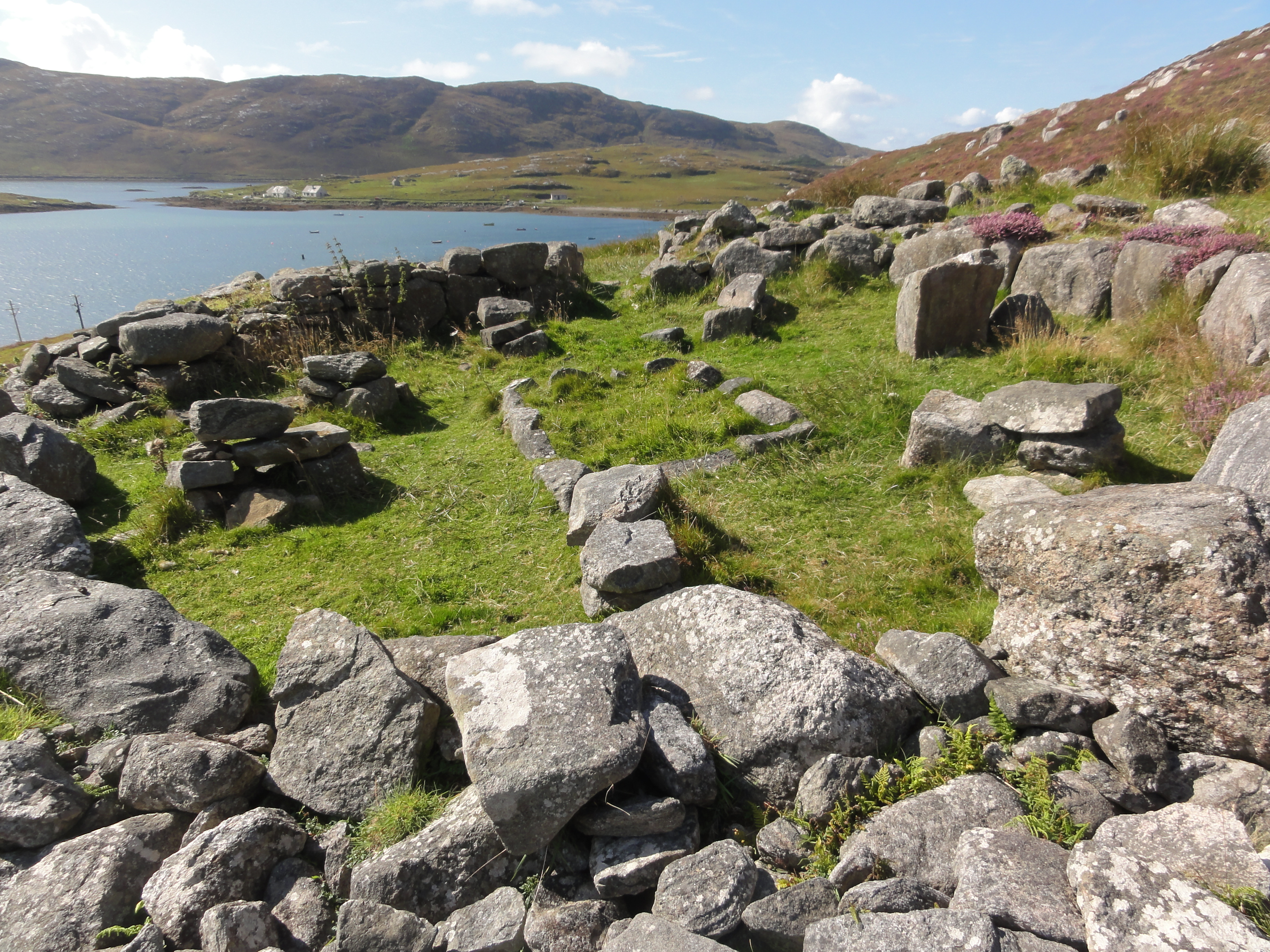
Iron Age wheelhouse near Vatersay

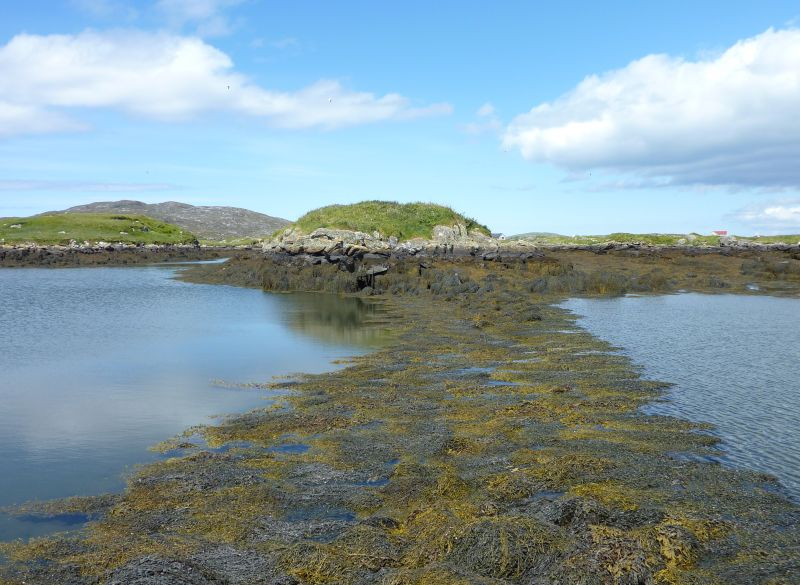
Broch at Bruernish

=== Kingdom of the Isles ===
The Vikings established the Kingdom of the Isles throughout the Hebrides, including Barra. Following Norwegian unification, the Kingdom of the Isles became a crown dependency of the Norwegian king; to the Norwegians, it was Suðreyjar (meaning southern isles). Malcolm III of Scotland acknowledged in writing that they were not Scottish, and King Edgar quitclaimed any residual doubts. In the north of Barra, from this period survived a gravestone, on which a Celtic cross is present on one side, and runic inscriptions on the other (Note: Discovered in 1865, the gravestone is now located in Edinburgh, though a facsimile was later placed in the chapel near the stone's original location on Barra).

In the mid 12th century, Somerled, a Norse-Gael of uncertain origin, launched a coup, which made Suðreyjar entirely independent. Following his death, Norwegian authority was nominally restored, but in practice, the kingdom was divided between Somerled's heirs (Clann Somhairle), and the dynasty that Somerled had deposed (the Crovan dynasty). Clann Ruaidhrí, a branch of Somerled's heirs, ruled Barra, as well as Uist, Eigg, Rùm, the Rough Bounds, Bute, Arran, and northern Jura.

In the 13th century, despite Edgar's quitclaim, Scottish forces attempted to conquer parts of Suðreyjar, culminating in the indecisive Battle of Largs. In 1266, the matter was settled by the Treaty of Perth, which transferred the whole of Suðreyjar to Scotland, in exchange for a very large sum of money. (Note: 4000 marks) The Treaty expressly preserved the status of the rulers of Suðreyjar; the Clann Ruaidhri lands, excepting Bute, Arran, and Jura, became the Lordship of Garmoran, a quasi-independent crown dependency, rather than an intrinsic part of Scotland.

=== Lordship of Garmoran ===
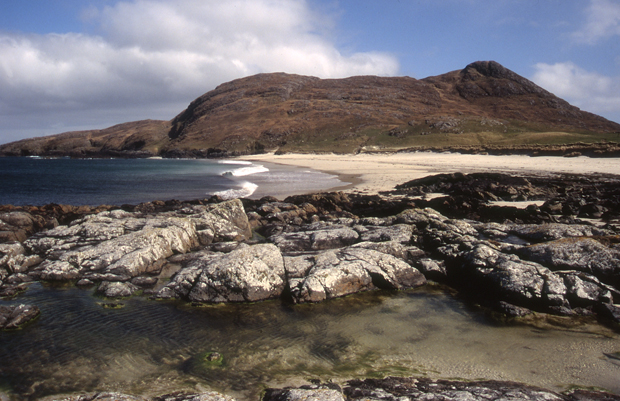
Cliad bay

In 1293, King John Balliol established the Sheriffdom of Skye, which included the Outer Hebrides. Following his usurpation, the sheriffdom ceased to be mentioned (Note: In surviving records, at least.), and the Garmoran lordship (including Barra) was confirmed to Ruaidhrí Mac Ruaidhrí, the head of Clann Ruaidhri. In 1343, King David II issued a further charter to Ruaidhrí's son, Raghnall, but Raghnall's assassination, just three years later, left Garmoran in the hands of Amy of Garmoran.

The southern parts of the Kingdom of the Isles had become the Lordship of the Isles, ruled by the MacDonalds (another group of Somerled's descendants). Amy married the MacDonald leader, John of Islay, but a decade later he divorced her, and married the king's niece instead (in return for a substantial dowry). As part of the divorce, John deprived his eldest son, Ranald, of the ability to inherit the Lordship of the Isles, in favour of a son by his new wife. As compensation, John granted Lordship of the Uists to Ranald's younger brother Godfrey and made Ranald Lord of the remainder of Garmoran.

On Ranald's death, disputes between Godfrey and his nephews led to an enormous amount of violence. In 1427, frustrated with the level of violence generally in the highlands, King James I demanded that highland leaders should attend a meeting at Inverness. On arrival, many of the leaders were seized and imprisoned; Alexander MacGorrie, son of Godfrey, was considered to be one of the two most reprehensible, and after a quick showtrial, was immediately executed. As Alexander had by now inherited Godfrey's de facto position as Lord of Garmoran, and in view of Ranald's heirs being no less responsible for the violence, King James declared the Lordship of Garmoran forfeit.

=== Lairds and pirates ===
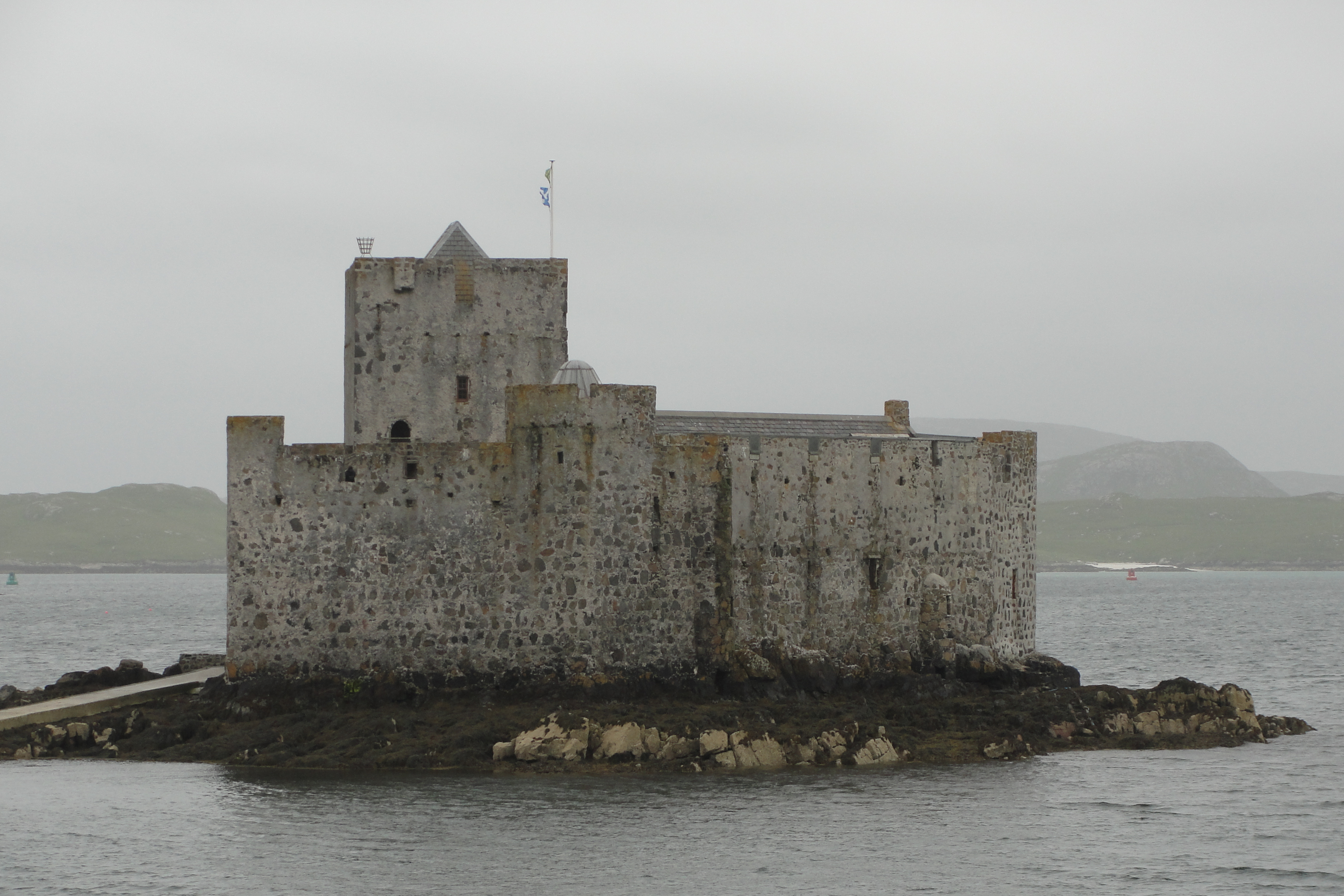
Kisimul Castle

Following the forfeiture, and in that same year, the Lord of the Isles granted Lairdship of Barra (and half of South Uist) to Giolla Adhamhnáin Mac Néill, Chief of Clan MacNeil.

Headquartering themselves at Kisimul Castle and making use of Birlinns, the MacNeils became famed for piracy after attacking English ships during the reign of Queen Elizabeth I. They were summoned by King James VI – King of Scotland – to answer for their behaviour. The Chief, Roderick MacNeil ("Rory the Turbulent"), argued that he thought King James would be pleased, since Queen Elizabeth had beheaded his mother Mary, Queen of Scots. Pleased, King James released him.

The mainly Catholic population of the island was under serious threat during the Jacobite Uprising of 1745. According to Bishop John Geddes, "Early in the spring of 1746, some ships of war came to the coast of the isle of Barra and landed some men, who threatened they would lay desolate the whole island if the priest was not delivered up to them. Father James Grant, who was missionary then, and afterward Bishop, being informed of the threats in a safe retreat in which he was in a little island, surrendered himself, and was carried prisoner to Mingarry Castle on the Western coast (i.e. Ardnamurchan)". He was detained and then deported.

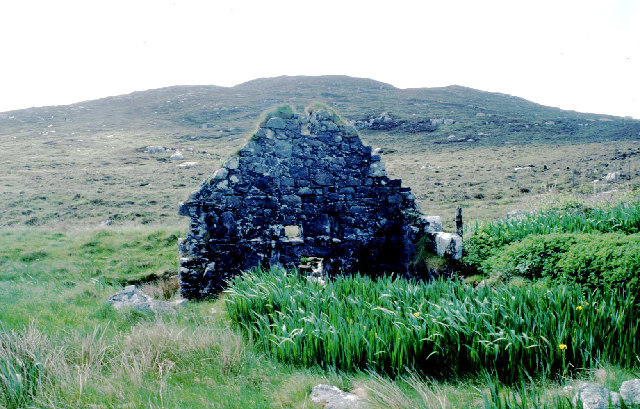
An abandoned watermill on Barra

The descendants of the Clan Chiefs held on to Barra until 1838. Roderick MacNeil, Chief of the MacNeils was heavily in debt and sold the island to Colonel John Gordon of Cluny for the sum of £38,050. Without any consultation with the islanders Gordon then offered Barra to the British Government for use as a penal colony.

In common with many of the new Anglo-Scottish landlords, Colonel Gordon evicted most of the islanders to make way for sheep farming in 1851. These were "some of the most cruel and shameful cases of inhumanity ever seen on the West Coast" with many of the displaced islanders joining the Scottish diaspora in Australia, New Zealand, the United States, and Canada.

The MacNeil Chiefs were also among the migrants, settling at first in Canada, but moving to the United States by the 20th century. Barra was restored to MacNeil ownership in 1937 when the Barra estate, which encompassed most of the island, was bought by Robert Lister Macneil, an American. In 2000, his heir, Ian Roderick Macneil (another American), let Kisimul Castle to Historic Scotland, on a 1000-year lease (for a rental of £1 and a bottle of whisky, per annum). In 2003, he transferred ownership of the Barra Estate to the Scottish Government. Under Scottish law, the inhabitants have the right to take possession of the estate themselves, if they so wish.

== Places of interest ==
The main village is Castlebay (Bàgh a' Chaisteil) in a sheltered bay, where Kisimul Castle sits on a small islet not far from shore; giving the village its name. This is the main harbour.

A smaller medieval tower house, Dun Mhic Leoid, is in the middle of Loch St Clare on the west side of the island at Tangasdale.

The highest elevation on the island is Heaval, near the top of which is a prominent white marble statue of the Madonna and Child, called "Our Lady of the Sea", which was erected during the Marian year of 1954. The predominant faith on the island is Catholicism and the Catholic church dedicated to Our Lady of the Sea is apparent to those arriving at Castlebay.

== Economy ==
Tourism provides the main income for the majority of islanders; the high season lasts from May to September. Thousands of people visit the island every year, the busiest times being during Fèis Bharraigh & BarraFest in July. The Dualchas Heritage and Cultural Centre is located in Castlebay, next to Castlebay Community School. It has various exhibitions each year and is open throughout the year. In April 2020, Condé Nast Traveller summed up Barra as "a delightful little island with its own castle and beach airport" and recommended visiting the "high cliffs in the east and lovely beaches and bays in the west".

The Outer Hebrides Web site particularly recommended visits to sites "the iconic Kisimul Castle at Castlebay" and stopping to see the Barra seals at Seal Bay. The Explore Scotland tourism Web site also discusses the Barra Golf Club, Kisimul Castle, Barra Heritage and Cultural Centre, Heaval for exceptional views, Church of Our Lady Star of the Sea and Cille Bharra, the ancient graveyard.

According to the Scottish Government, "tourism is by far and away the mainstay industry" of the Outer Hebrides, "generating £65m in economic value for the islands, sustaining around 1000 jobs" The report adds that the "islands receive 219,000 visitors per year". The Outer Hebrides tourism bureau states that 10–15% of economic activity on the islands was made up of tourism in 2017. The agency states that the "exact split between islands is not possible" when calculating the number of visits, but "the approximate split is Lewis (45%), Uist (25%), Harris (20%), Barra (10%)".

Castlebay is the primary base for tourists, with a few hotels, a supermarket, bank and petrol station. Explore Scotland stated in 2020 that the island was "also an ideal starting point for visiting and exploring the Uists and Benbecula".

In 2010, camping on the machair at the airport was banned due to erosion; this prompted crofters to provide areas on their crofts for visiting tourists. Boat trips to the neighbouring island of Mingulay are available during the summer season, and island-hopping plane trips are also available.

The Barratlantic factory, in Northbay is a fish and shellfish processing company. As of 2020, its main products were king scallops and langoustines but it was selling most types of white fish from the quayside. Their website indicated that the stock included "cod; haddock; skate; witches; megrims; turbot; Dover sole and monkfish which you can buy direct from the factory". The Hebridean Toffee Factory in Castlebay is one of the few manufacturers on Barra and it makes the products locally. According to Visit Scotland, the toffee can be ordered from anywhere in the world; "it is made to order and is usually shipped within 24 hours".

Isle of Barra Distillers was founded in 2016; their Barra Atlantic Gin was first sold in August 2017 and the company has expanded since then. As of early 2021, the distillery continued marketing gin, with great success. The plan for whisky was stated on its Web site as: "It is our goal to open the Islands first Single Malt Whisky Distillery within the next 2–3 years".

The Isle of Barra distillery was founded in 2003 as Uisge Beatha nan Eilean Ltd and became a Community Benefit Society in 2018 under the Co-operative and Community Benefit Societies Act 2014. In December 2012, four 6 kW wind turbines made by Proven (Proven were bought by Kingspan Group in 2011) were erected next to the reservoir Loch Uisge, which originally supplied the mains water to Castlebay. It is proposed that as much as possible of the raw materials, supply chain and labour to produce the whisky should remain as local as possible to minimise imports and maximise the benefit to the island's economy.

=== Coimhearsachd Bharraigh agus Bhatarsaigh ===
Coimhearsachd Bharraidh agus Bhatarsaidh (Barra and Vatersay Community) Ltd is a community-owned company whose aim is to support community development on Barra and Vatersay. The company is managed by a volunteer board of directors drawn from the membership. Membership is open to residents of the two islands whose names appear on the voting register.

The company's latest project is a 900 kW Enercon E-44 wind turbine installed at Gòb Sgùrabhal, at the most northwesterly point of the island. At the time of construction, it was anticipated that the wind resource would make this one of the most productive 900 kW turbines in Western Europe.

== Transport ==
=== Air ===
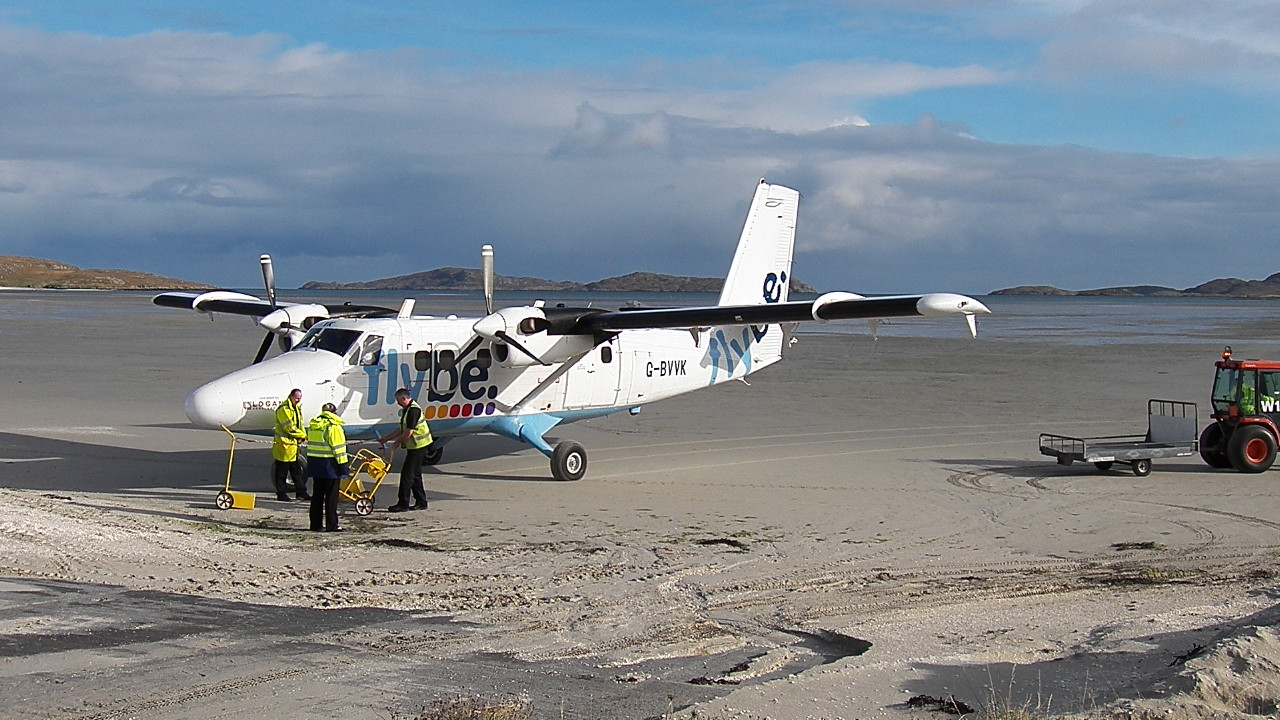
Twin Otter at Barra airport

Barra's airport, near Northbay, uses the 2-mile-long (3 km) cockle shell beach of Traigh Mhor, (Scottish Gaelic: An Tràigh Mhòr "The Great Beach") as a runway. Planes can land and take off only at low tide, so the timetable varies. Voted the world's most scenic landing location using a scheduled flight, Barra's airport is claimed to be the only airport in the world to have regular scheduled flights landing on a beach.

=== Maritime ===
The primary means of transport for residents to the Scottish mainland is via the Caledonian MacBrayne ferry, MV Isle of Lewis, between the Castlebay harbour and Oban ferry terminal. The Oban-Barra ferry service has faced scrutiny from residents due to an ageing fleet, frequent breakdowns, and poor weather, which can often leave locals and goods stranded in Oban or Barra.

Since 2003, Caledonian MacBrayne runs a smaller ferry service as part of the Sound of Barra Integrated Transport Project with the MV Loch Alainn servicing the Ardmhor ferry terminal in Barra and Eriskay, making 5 crossings a day and lasting 40 minutes. This journey is often congested throughout the summer months. The ferry service is integrated with the Eriskay causeway, connecting Barra to South Uist and the rest of the Western Isles.

=== Land ===
Aurora Trans Co. operates a bus service in Barra and Vatersay on behalf of the local council, consisting of the W32 and W33 buses.

== Media ==
The island has featured in a variety of media.

=== Film and TV ===
Barra is home to a TV production company, Little Day Productions, who produced the documentary Barra to Barcelona, which was broadcast on BBC Alba in 2022 and 2023. Much of their work features Barra and Vatersay. Barra has regularly featured in various television programmes on the Scottish Gaelic channel BBC Alba since it began broadcasting in 2008.

The 1949 Ealing Studios comedy Whisky Galore! was filmed on Barra. The film is based on the novel Whisky Galore by Sir Compton Mackenzie, itself a fictionalised telling of the story of the SS Politician, which ran aground with a cargo of some 50,000 cases of whisky on board in 1941. Mackenzie, who lived near the airport and died in 1972, is buried in a grave marked by a simple cross at Cille Bharra cemetery, which is situated a little way up the hillside overlooking Eoligarry jetty. The sequel Rockets Galore! was also filmed in and around the island.

The 1976 romance Emily by Jilly Cooper was filmed on the island; it starred Gemma Craven and Ronald Pickup. In the sitcom Dad's Army, broadcast from 1968 to 1977, Private Frazer claims to be from Barra, which he often describes as "a wild and lonely place".

Barra was featured on Time Team, in which archaeologists excavated several Iron Age sites.

Barra was also featured in the 2006 Channel 5 documentary Extraordinary People: The Boy Who Lived Before, where a young boy named Cameron, who lived in Glasgow, claimed to have memories of past life on the island.

The island was the location for the fifth (2011) and sixth series (2012) of the BBC Two documentary An Island Parish documenting the arrival and subsequent experiences of a new Catholic priest on the island – Father John Paul.

=== Books ===
The specialist in mystical theology and author Rayner Torkington wrote a novel concerning Christian Mysticism featuring a character based on his late brother Peter Torkington called Peter Calvay, whom in the novel had lived on the island of Hellisay for a number of years in the first half of the twentieth century. The book, titled Peter Calvay, Hermit: A Personal Rediscovery of Prayer, was first published in 1977 and has had at least eleven reprintings.

Torkington's novel Wisdom from the Western Isles: The Making of a Mystic, published in 2008, also describes the author's meetings with Peter Calvay whilst he was staying on Barra.

=== Other ===
In 2008 the Barra RNLI Lifeboat, Edna Windsor, was featured on a series of postage stamps. The first class stamp shows the 17-metre (56 ft) Severn class lifeboat in action in the Sound of Berneray 20 kilometres (12 mi) southwest of Barra in 3.5 m (11 ft 6 in) swell with 30 km/h (16 kn) of wind.

Having been flown unofficially for at least a decade, the island's flag received official recognition from the Lyon Court and the Flag Institute in November 2017. The design is a white Nordic cross on a green background.

== Climate ==
Barra has an oceanic climate, with mild temperatures year-round.

Climate data for Barra (Traigh Mhòr Airport, 0 m asl, averages 1991–2020)
Month	Jan	Feb	Mar	Apr	May	Jun	Jul	Aug	Sep	Oct	Nov	Dec	Year
Record high °C (°F)	13.0 (55.4)	12.9 (55.2)	13.5 (56.3)	20.3 (68.5)	20.1 (68.2)	21.9 (71.4)	24.7 (76.5)	24.3 (75.7)	21.0 (69.8)	16.1 (61.0)	15.0 (59.0)	14.2 (57.6)	24.7 (76.5)
Mean daily maximum °C (°F)	8.6 (47.5)	8.2 (46.8)	9.2 (48.6)	10.7 (51.3)	13.1 (55.6)	14.9 (58.8)	16.4 (61.5)	16.6 (61.9)	15.1 (59.2)	12.6 (54.7)	10.4 (50.7)	8.8 (47.8)	12.1 (53.8)
Daily mean °C (°F)	6.6 (43.9)	6.2 (43.2)	6.9 (44.4)	8.4 (47.1)	10.4 (50.7)	12.4 (54.3)	14.1 (57.4)	14.3 (57.7)	13.0 (55.4)	10.7 (51.3)	8.5 (47.3)	6.9 (44.4)	9.9 (49.8)
Mean daily minimum °C (°F)	4.6 (40.3)	4.3 (39.7)	4.7 (40.5)	6.1 (43.0)	7.8 (46.0)	10.0 (50.0)	11.7 (53.1)	12.1 (53.8)	11.0 (51.8)	8.8 (47.8)	6.5 (43.7)	4.9 (40.8)	7.7 (45.9)
Record low °C (°F)	−0.6 (30.9)	−2.5 (27.5)	−2.6 (27.3)	−1.5 (29.3)	2.3 (36.1)	5.0 (41.0)	7.3 (45.1)	5.9 (42.6)	4.4 (39.9)	2.1 (35.8)	−0.4 (31.3)	−3.2 (26.2)	−3.2 (26.2)
Average precipitation mm (inches)	143.5 (5.65)	101.7 (4.00)	99.0 (3.90)	70.2 (2.76)	55.2 (2.17)	67.1 (2.64)	78.3 (3.08)	93.7 (3.69)	93.2 (3.67)	112.7 (4.44)	125.2 (4.93)	135.9 (5.35)	1,175.7 (46.29)
Average precipitation days (≥ 1.0 mm)	22.5	18.8	18.4	13.9	12.9	12.8	14.8	17.4	16.5	20.3	22.0	21.7	212.0
Mean monthly sunshine hours	27.2	63.2	105.5	163.0	211.8	177.3	160.6	158.7	118.6	84.8	42.8	19.5	1,333.1
Source 1: Met Office
Source 2: Starlings Roost Weather

== People from Barra ==
- Angus MacNeil (b. 1970), Member of Parliament for Na h-Eileanan an Iar, 2005–2024
- Flora MacNeil (1928—2015), Scottish Gaelic traditional singer and Barra native
- Mick MacNeil (b. 1958), Simple Minds keyboardist 1978–1990

== See also ==
- List of islands of Scotland
- List of places in the Western Isles
- Fèis Bharraigh
