= Castlebay Community School =

- Sgoil Bàgh a Chaisteil

Location
- Castlebay; Barra, HS9 5XD; Scotland
- Coordinates: 56.9567°N 7.4958°W

Information
- Type: Primary, secondary
- Age: 3 to 18
- Enrolment: 170
- Language: English, Gaelic

Castlebay Community School is a bilingual Gaelic/English school for ages 3–18 on the Scottish island of Barra.

There are four schools on Barra - three in Castlebay - the Nursery School/Sgoil àraich, Castlebay Primary School/Bun-sgoil Bhàgh a’ Chaisteil, and Castlebay Secondary School/Sgoil Bhàgh a’ Chaisteil, and one in Eoligarry, in the north of the island - Eoligarry Primary School/Bun-Sgoil Eòligearraidh, This group of four schools all operate under one headteacher.

In September 2007, it hosted a major tribute to sailors who sailed in the Merchant Navy from the Western Isles and around the world. Such tributes included various plays, traditional highland dancing, tours around ships used by the Merchant Navy and a fly past by the RAF. Representatives from Her Majesty's Armed Forces around the world were also present.
