= Borve, Barra =

Coordinates: 56.981°N 7.507°W

Borve: Scottish Gaelic: Borgh
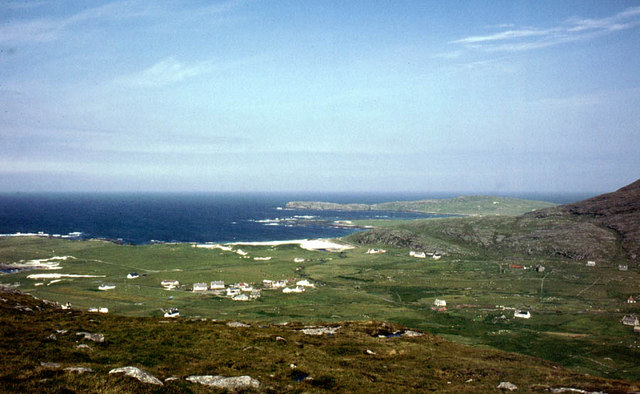
- Borve and the adjoining coastline, viewed from Beinn na Moine

- Location within the Outer Hebrides
- Language: Scottish Gaelic; English
- OS grid reference: NF655012
- Civil parish: Barra
- Council area: Na h-Eileanan Siar
- Lieutenancy area: Western Isles
- Country: Scotland
- Sovereign state: United Kingdom
- Post town: ISLE OF BARRA
- Postcode district: HS9
- Dialling code: 01871
- Police: Scotland
- Fire: Scottish
- Ambulance: Scottish
- UK Parliament: Na h-Eileanan an Iar
- Scottish Parliament: Na h-Eileanan an Iar

Borve (Scottish Gaelic: Borgh) is a village on the west coast of the island of Barra in the Outer Hebrides, Scotland. Borve is within the parish of Barra, and is situated on the A888 which is the island's circular main road.

== History ==
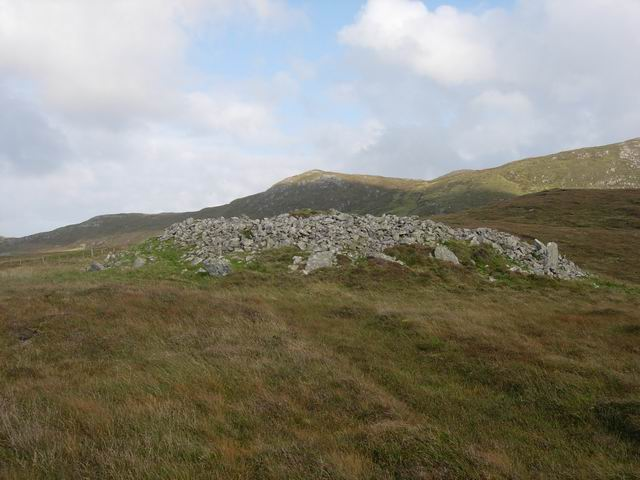
The cairn at Dun Barpa

There are a number of Neolithic remains nearby, including a burial cairn, and standing stones. A rich Viking burial was unearthed in the vicinity of Borve at a site called Ardvouray in 1862, the contents of which can be found in the British Museum. The grave included amongst other things a pair of oval brooches, a comb, fragments of a drinking horn, a spear, a pair of shears, a weaving sword and a whetstone.
