= Vatersay Causeway =

Causeway between the islands of Vatersay and Barra in the Outer Hebrides

Vatersay Causeway Rathad Bhàgh Bhatarsaigh
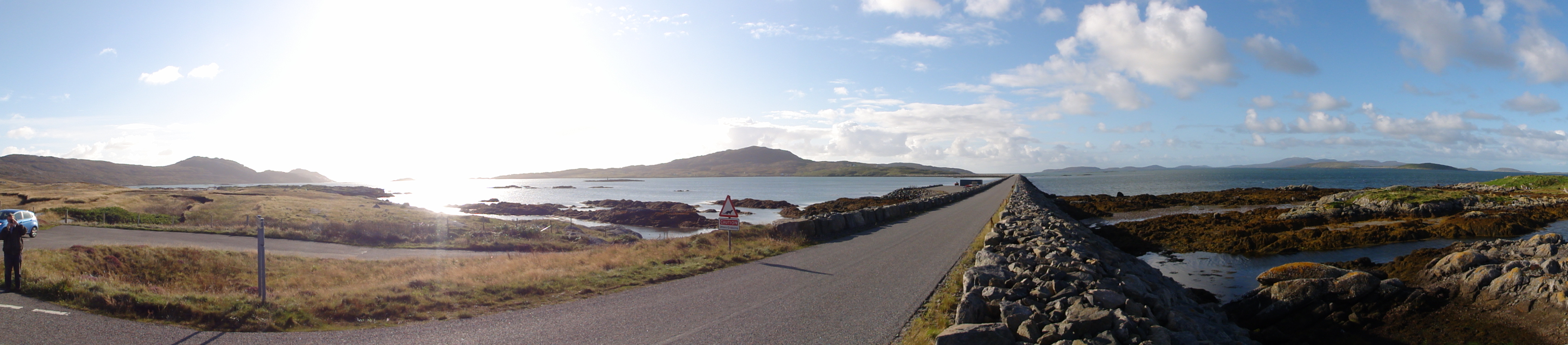
- The Vatersay Causeway
- Coordinates: 56°56′48.2″N 7°31′56.2″W
- Carries: A888
- Crosses: Sound of Vatersay
- Owner: Comhairle nan Eilean Siar

Characteristics
- Total length: 0.25 kilometres (0.16 mi)

History
- Architect: Transport Scotland
- Constructed by: R.J. McLeod (Contractors) Ltd.
- Construction start: 1989
- Construction end: 1991
- Construction cost: £3.7 million
- Opened: 1991

Location
- Interactive map of Vatersay Causeway

The Vatersay Causeway (Scottish Gaelic: Rathad Bhàgh Bhatarsaigh) is a 250-metre-long causeway that links the Scottish Hebridean Islands of Vatersay and Barra across the Sound of Vatersay (Scottish Gaelic: Caolas Bhatarsaigh).

The causeway was constructed between 1989 and 1991, and provides a direct link between Vatersay, the most southerly inhabited island of the Outer Hebrides, and Barra. Before its inception, the island was reachable only via a passenger ferry from Castlebay, making the transportation of goods, cattle, or vehicles arduous, necessitating the hiring of private boats.

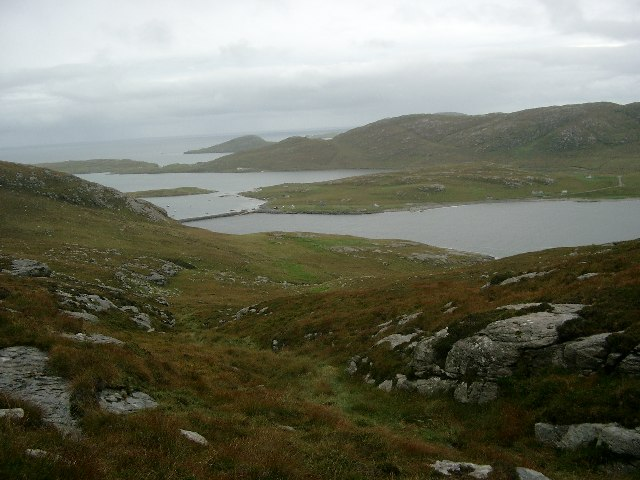
The Vatersay Causeway from Beinn Tangabhal

== Historical background and need for the causeway ==
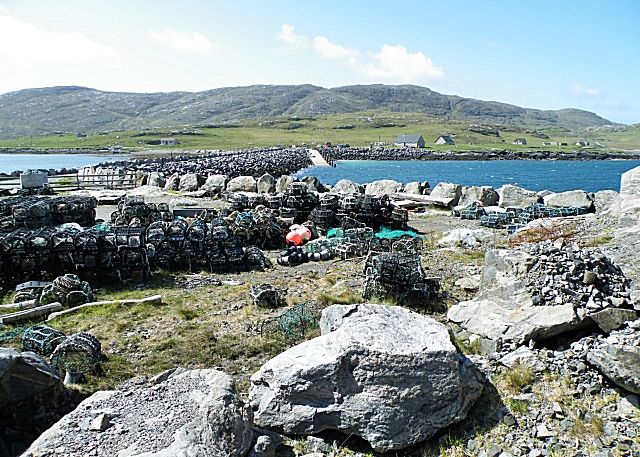
The Vatersay Causeway

The effects of the Highland Clearances reduced Vatersay's population to a mere 13 inhabitants by 1901. However, immigration from Barra and Mingulay subsequently caused a surge in the population, culminating in a peak of 288 residents by 1911. The population continued to fluctuate, reaching a low of 65 in 1988.

Prior to 1989, Vatersay stood as the sole inhabited Hebridean Island without a vehicular ferry or causeway. Other small islands that lacked causeways were served by relatively modern ferries, subsidised by Comhairle nan Eilean Siar. A service for Scalpay was operated by Caledonian MacBrayne, which operated ferries to the mainland of Scotland and between other islands. Conversely, the ferries servicing Berneray and Eriskay were directly run by the Comhairle nan Eilean Siar.

Transportation to and from Vatersay was mainly provided by a passenger launch which travelled between the northern part of the island and Castlebay. The journey was often affected by rough sea conditions. From 1975, a single-vehicle ferry operated, but this was discontinued in 1977 as it was deemed unsuitable. From that point onwards, transportation of heavy goods relied on hired vessels.

Commencing in 1983, The Vatersay Co-operative (Scottish Gaelic: Co-Chomunn Bhatarsaidh) made use of a barge provided by the Highlands and Islands Development Board to transport livestock. However, once this barge was decommissioned, the previous practice of swimming cattle between islands was revived. This method was abandoned after an incident in 1987, when a bull drowned in the Sound of Vatersay.

Following this incident, and with no other safe means for transport of livestock available, crofters began hiring boats to transport their sheep, while cattle transportation became dependent on a barge provided by the Comhairle nan Eilean Siar as the demand for a fixed crossing intensified.

The Barra and Vatersay Council of Social Service and the Vatersay Community Council had begun campaigning for renewed vehicular access in the late 1970s, and this campaign continued into the 1980s, with four options being considered:

1. a vehicular ferry on the same route as the passenger ferry.
2. a new road on Barra, with a ferry service across the Sound of Vatersay at the shortest crossing point.
3. a bridge.
4. a causeway.

The debate on the preferred method also included discussions around Vatersay's status as a tombolo, a Site of Special Scientific Interest, and the loss of navigation in the Sound. A short-crossing ferry option was rejected because of the cost of a deepwater terminal in the Sound of Vatersay, and the need for the ship to visit Castlebay in any case, for bunkering. A bridge would also have incurred high construction and maintenance costs. After considerable debate, a simple causeway was the option selected.

Negotiations between the Comhairle nan Eilean Siar, the Scottish Development Department, and the Secretary of State for Scotland concluded in 1984, with agreement to provisionally support the building of a causeway, on the condition that a hydrographic survey and tidal calculations did not reveal any insurmountable obstacles. These issues were resolved, and in 1986 Comhairle nan Eilean Siar agreed to provide the causeway subject to additional capital being made available, and Parliamentary Approval being obtained.

The Western Isles Islands Council (Vatersay Causeway) Order Confirmation Act 1987 empowered the Comhairle to proceed, with the £3.7 million cost met by funding from the European Regional Development Fund (50%), the Scottish Development Department (25%) and Comhairle nan Eilean Siar (25%).

== Design and construction ==
The location of the causeway, across a 250-metre-wide gap with a minimum water depth of 11 metres, presented challenging design and construction conditions. The Sound of Vatersay links the Atlantic Ocean on one side with the Sea of the Hebrides on the other, with very strong tidal currents active at all states of the tide.

The contract for the construction of the causeway was awarded to R.J. McLeod (Contractors) Ltd. in 1989. The works took 18 months to complete and included a new two-kilometre access road on Barra. A total of 220,000 tonnes of rock was used for the construction of the causeway, with a local quarry at Beinn Tangabhal used as the primary source. The causeway was completed and fully opened to traffic in July 1991.

The causeway was one of a series of fixed links built between the many islands which make up the Outer Hebrides, including the Eriskay causeway, completed in 2001.

== See also ==
- Transport in Scotland
- Outer Hebrides
