= Castlebay =

Village on Barra, Outer Hebrides, Scotland

Coordinates: 56.955°N 7.486°W

Castlebay: Scottish Gaelic: Bàgh a' Chaisteil
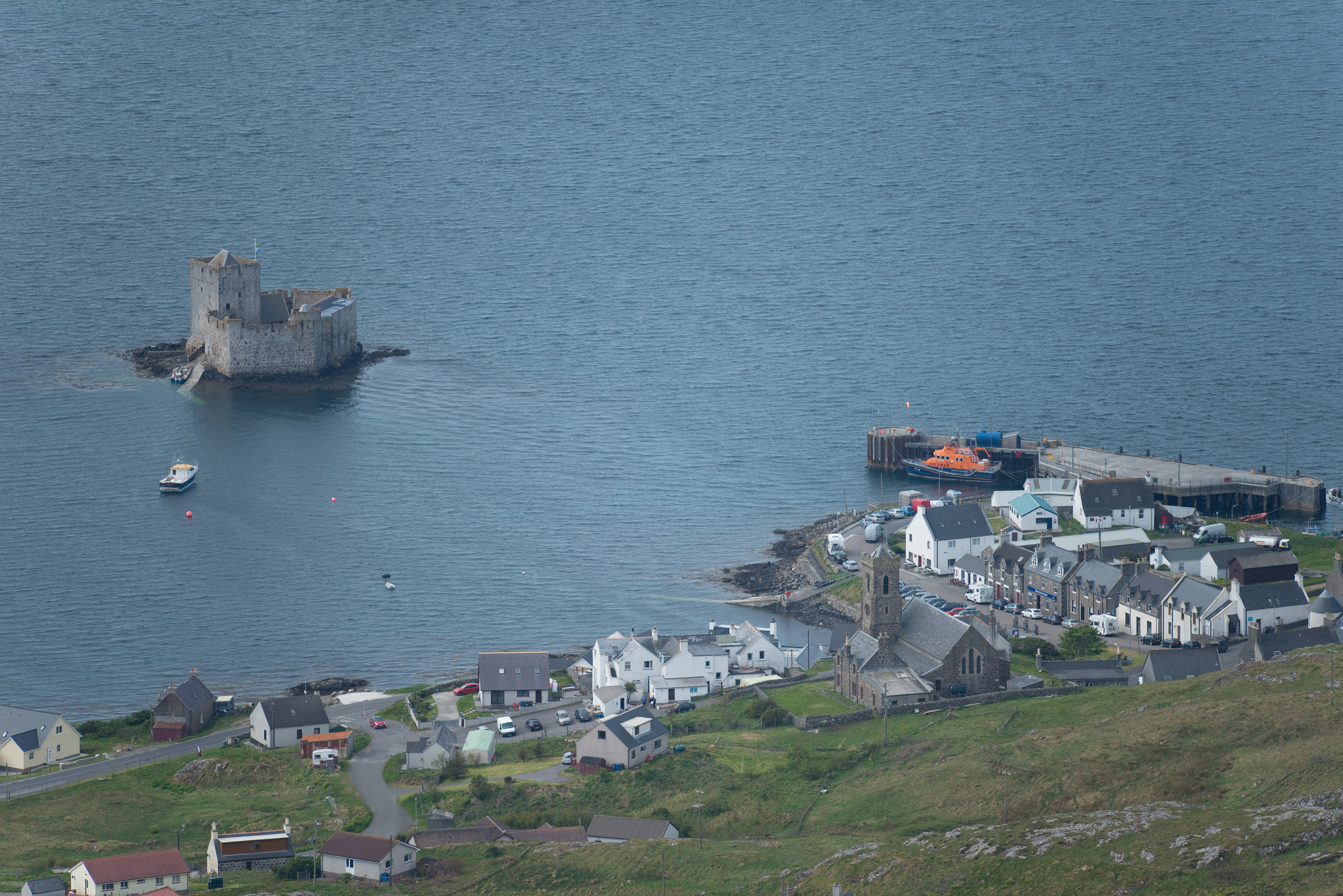
- Kisimul Castle, the ancient seat of Clan MacNeil, and part of the town as seen from Heaval

- Location within the Outer Hebrides
- Language: Scottish Gaelic; English
- OS grid reference: NL665982
  - Edinburgh: 178 mi (286 km)
  - London: 479 mi (771 km)
- Civil parish: Barra
- Council area: Na h-Eileanan Siar
- Lieutenancy area: Western Isles
- Country: Scotland
- Sovereign state: United Kingdom
- Post town: ISLE OF BARRA
- Postcode district: HS9
- Dialling code: 01871
- Police: Scotland
- Fire: Scottish
- Ambulance: Scottish
- UK Parliament: Na h-Eileanan an Iar
- Scottish Parliament: Na h-Eileanan an Iar

Castlebay (Scottish Gaelic: Bàgh a' Chaisteil [baːɣ ə ˈxaʃtʲɪl]) is the main village and a community council area on the island of Barra in the Outer Hebrides, Scotland. The village is located on the south coast of the island, and overlooks a bay in the Atlantic Ocean dominated by Kisimul Castle, as well as nearby islands such as Vatersay. Castlebay is also within the parish of Barra. The village is located on the A888, which serves as a circular road around Barra. In 1971, it had a population of 307.

== Community ==
Castlebay is home to the majority of shops on the island. The main street forms a square with the ferry terminal and the ring road, and features several grocery shops, a bank, post office, and tourist information centre. There is a larger supermarket to the west of the village, having opened in October 2009. There are also several hotels in the village, plus the island's medical centre, a petrol station and the police station.

=== Church ===
Our Lady, Star of the Sea, a Roman Catholic church, was opened in 1888 on a mound overlooking the town centre. It was designed by an architect from Oban, G. Woulfe Brenan, along with a house further down the slope for the priest to reside in. The northern gable of the church features a stained glass window depicting the Crucifixion, and the southern gables depict Our Lady, Star of the Sea. Renovation works on the church were completed in early 2007.

=== Education ===
The Castlebay Community School (Scottish Gaelic: Sgoil Bhàgh a’ Chaisteil), is located on the western side of Castlebay. It is the only source of secondary education on Barra. Since 2007, the school has had responsibility for the Castlebay preschool (both the English and the Gaelic Medium), meaning that with its Primary School division it caters for all ages of school children.

Since 1992 Castlebay High School has provided full secondary school facilities. Until then Barra pupils studying for Highers had to board in Stornoway and attend school there.

In September 2007, the school received an HMIE report negatively criticised relationships among the secondary school's staff and management, but praised those in the primary school.

In September 2022 the Island received £1 million for Gaelic development at the Castlebay education and health hub.

== History ==
Kisimul Castle is located approximately 100 yards (90 m) away from the ferry terminal in the centre of the bay that Castlebay overlooks. Kisimul was abandoned in 1838 when the island was sold, and the castle's condition subsequently deteriorated. Some of its stone was used as ballast for fishing vessels, and some even ended up as paving in Glasgow. The remains of the castle, along with most of the island of Barra, were purchased in 1937 by Robert Lister MacNeil, the Chief of Clan MacNeil, who made efforts at restoration.

In 2001, the castle was leased by the Chief of Clan MacNeil to Historic Scotland for 1,000 years for the annual sum of £1 and a bottle of whisky.

For the 2011 census the island on which Kismul Castle is built was classified by the National Records of Scotland as an inhabited island that "had no usual residents at the time of either the 2001 or 2011 censuses". (Note: There were 93 inhabited islands listed in the 2011 census and more than 20 others that are inhabited from time to time but are not so listed.)

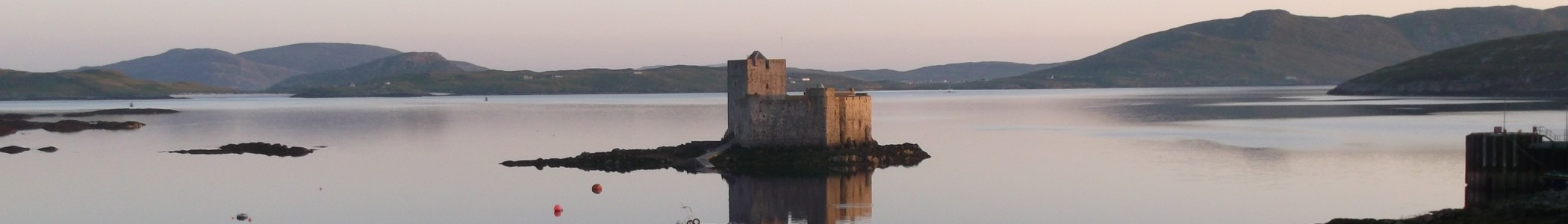
Kisimul castle in the bay of Castlebay

== Media ==
Castlebay was the main setting for the 1949 Ealing Studios comedy, Whisky Galore!, and its 1957 sequel, Rockets Galore!, which were both filmed on Barra. The earlier film is based on the novel Whisky Galore by Sir Compton Mackenzie, itself a fictionalised telling of the story of the SS Politician, which ran aground with a cargo of some 50,000 cases of whisky on board in 1941. Mackenzie, who lived near the airport and died in 1972, is buried in a grave marked by a simple cross at Cille Bharra cemetery, which is situated a little way up the hillside overlooking Eoligarry jetty.

In the 2010 Channel 4 programme Dom Joly and the Black Island, Joly and Tintinologist Michael Farr identify Castlebay and Kisimul as the locations of Kiltoch and the Ben More Castle used as settings in The Adventures of Tintin comic The Black Island, although the scenes of reaching it by boat and exploring it on foot were filmed at Lochranza Castle on the Isle of Arran.

In 2011, 18 episodes, series 5 and 6, of An Island Parish were screened on BBC2 documenting the arrival and subsequent experiences of a new Catholic priest on the island, Father John Paul.

== Transport ==
Castlebay is home to the main ferry terminal, which is operated by Caledonian MacBrayne. It is known that steam ferries were plying between Castlebay and Oban in the late 1800s, but travelling conditions were poor. The first roll-on-roll-off ferry was the MV Iona in 1974, which could load broadside on, which was necessary until the 1980s, when a purpose-built bow loading ramp for vehicles was built at Castlebay, allowing much larger ferries to dock and resulted in quicker loading times.

Between 1989 and 1998, Lord of the Isles travelled daily between Oban, Castlebay and Lochboisdale on the island of South Uist, sometimes stopping on the Isle of Mull. In 1998, Clansman replaced Lord of the Isles on the Oban-Castlebay-Lochboisdale run. From April 2016, the former Stornoway ferry Isle of Lewis took over the Barra route with a new dedicated service, operating seven return sailings a week between Castlebay and Oban, allowing Clansman to operate dedicated services from Oban to Coll, Tiree and Colonsay.

From summer 2016, Lord of the Isles began a dedicated daily service between Mallaig and Lochboisdale, ending South Uist's link with Oban.

== Gallery ==
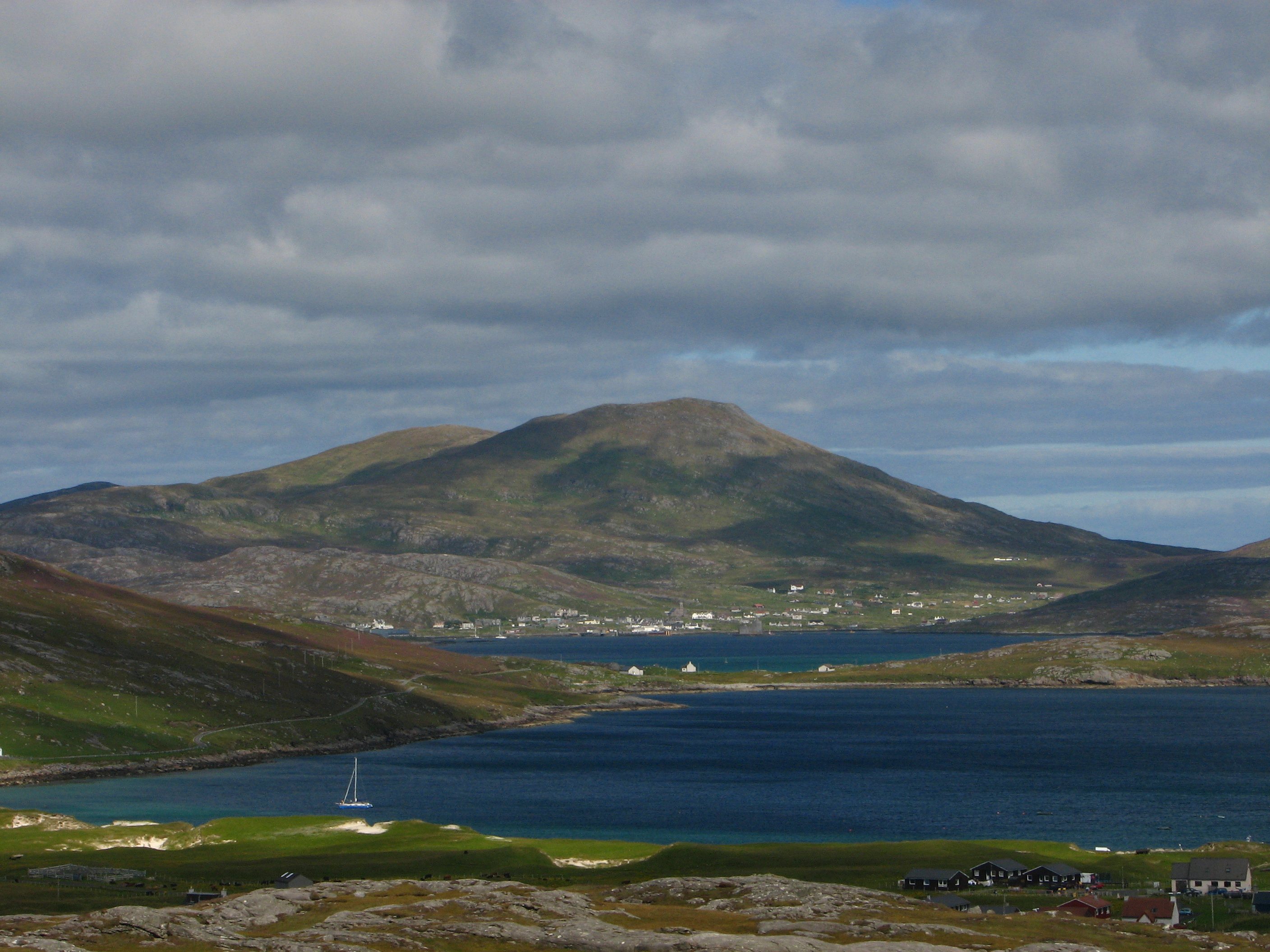
Castlebay village and the heights of Heaval, from Vatersay

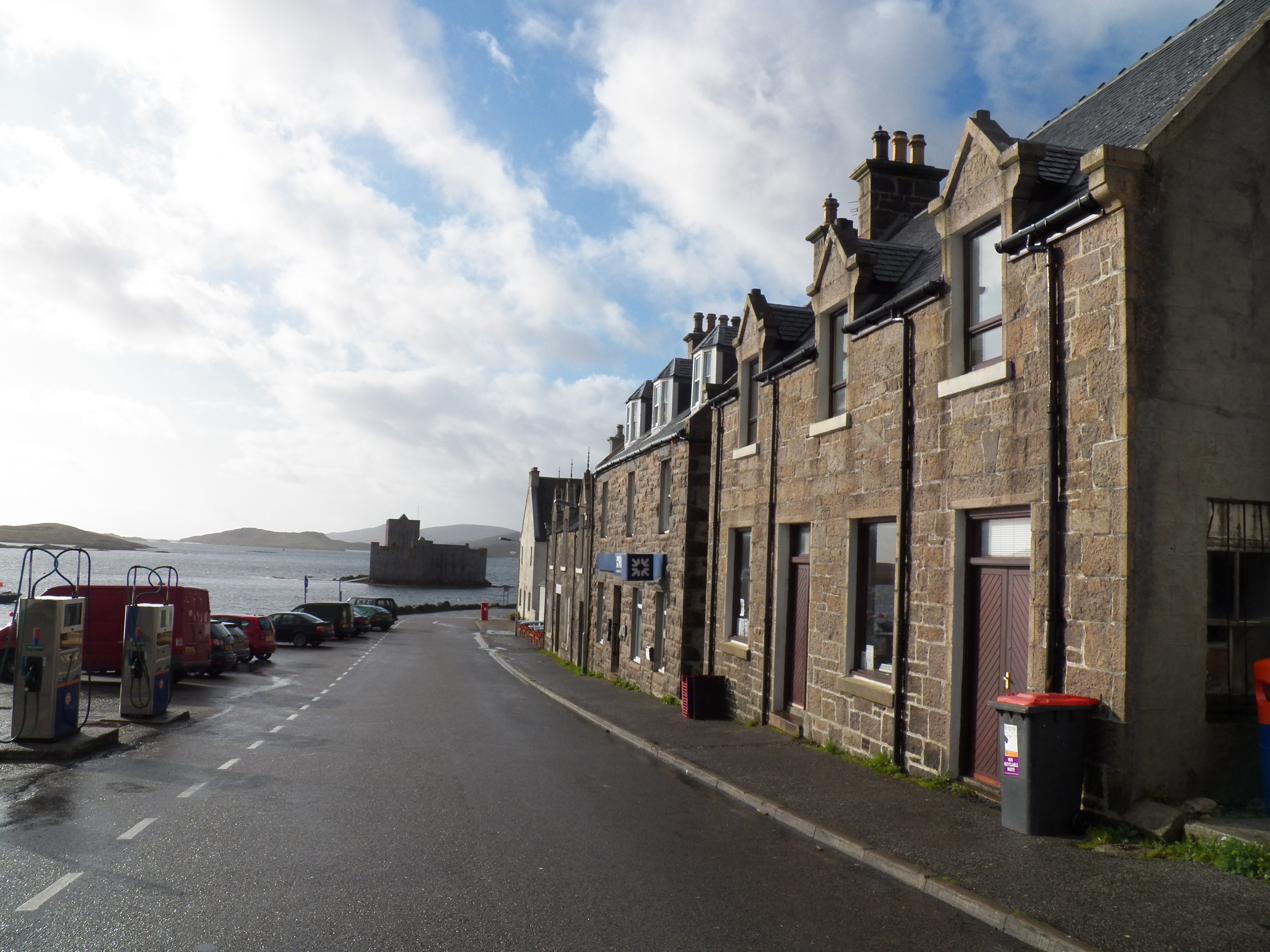
The Main Street Castlebay
