= Allan (surname) =

Allan is a Scottish surname derived from the given name of the same spelling. Notable people and fictional characters with the surname Allan include:

== People ==
=== A ===
- Abby Allan, New Zealand footballer
- Absalom Shade Allan (1843–1928), Canadian politician
- Adam Allan (1904 – after 1937), Scottish footballer
- Alasdair Allan (born 1971), Scottish National Party politician
- Alex Allan (born 1951), British civil servant
- Alex Allan (rugby union) (born 1992), Scotland international rugby union player
- Alex Allan (footballer), Scottish footballer
- Alexander Allan (locomotive engineer) (1809–1891), British locomotive engineer
- Alexander Allan (ship owner) (1780–1854), Scottish sea captain
- Alister Allan (born 1944), British sport shooter
- Andrea Allan (born 1946), Scottish actress
- Andres Allan (1965–1988), Estonian poet
- Andrew Allan (shipowner) (1822–1901), Canadian businessman and financier
- Andrew Allan (radio executive) (1907–1974), Canadian radio executive
- Andrew Allan (artist) (1863–1942), British lithographic artist
- Andy Allan (1869–1916), Australian rules footballer
- Angus Allan (1936–2007), British comic strip writer

=== B ===
- Barry Allan (born 1942), Australian rules footballer
- Ben Allan (born 1968), Australian rules footballer
- Benny Allan (born 1958), Papua New Guinean politician
- Betty Allan (1905–1952), Australian statistician
- Bill Allan (1870–1948), Scottish footballer
- Bo Allan (born 2006), Australian rules footballer
- Bob Allan (1872–1918), Scottish footballer
- Brad Allan (1973–2021), Australian martial artist and actor born
- Bryce Allan (1859–1922), Scotland international rugby union player

=== C ===
- Cameron Allan (1955–2013), Australian composer
- Cecil Allan (1914–2003), Northern Irish footballer
- Chad Allan (1943–2023), Canadian musician
- Charles Allan (1908–1947), English footballer
- Charlie Allan (farmer) (1939–2023), Scottish farmer
- Chilton Allan (1786–1858), American politician
- Chris Allan (born 1998), English footballer
- Claire Allan (born 1985), English rugby union player
- Col Allan (born 1953), Australian journalist
- Colin Allan (1921–1993), New Zealand author and lecturer
- Corey Allan (born 1998), Australian rugby league footballer
- Crawford Allan (born 1967), Scottish football referee

=== D ===
- Danny Allan (born 1989), English rugby league footballer
- Dave Allan (racing driver) (1965–2012), British racing driver
- David Allan (painter) (1744–1796), Scottish painter
- David Allan (broadcaster) (born 1940), English continuity announcer
- David Allan (cricketer) (born 1937), West Indian cricketer
- David Allan (footballer) (1863–1930), Scottish footballer
- David Allan (police officer) (1879–1961), British soldier and police officer
- David Allan (cyclist) (1951–1989), Australian cyclist
- David W. Allan (born 1936), American physicist
- Davie Allan (active 1963– ), American guitarist
- Deborah Allan (born 1975), British judoka
- Denis Allan (born 1944), Canadian chess player
- Derek Allan (born 1974), Scottish footballer
- Dick Allan (born 1939), Scotland international rugby union player
- Donald Allan (born 1949), Australian cyclist
- Donald James Allan (1907–1978), British classical scholar
- Dot Allan (1886–1964), Scottish writer
- Doug Allan (1951–2026), Scottish wildlife cameraman
- Douglas Allan (1896–1967), British geologist and curator
- Duncan Allan (born 1991), Kenyan cricketer

=== E ===
- Ebenezer Allan (1752–1813), American British Loyalist
- Ed Allan (born 2004), Australian rules footballer
- Edgar Allan (1842–1904), English-American politician
- Edris Allan (1909–1995), Jamaican activist
- Eleanor Allan (born 1937), Scottish lawn bowler
- Elizabeth Allan (1910–1990), English actress
- Elkan Allan (1922–2006), British television producer
- Elyse Allan (born 1955), Canadian businesswoman
- Eric Allan (1940–2026), British actor
- Esther Allan (1914–1985), American composer and pianist

=== F ===
- Finlay Allan (born 2001), British judoka
- Fleming Allan (1904–1965), American composer of Western music
- Florence Allan (born 1998), Caymanian sailor
- Foz Allan (born 1953), British producer and scriptwriter
- Frank Allan (1849–1917), Australian cricketer
- Frank Allan (bishop) (1935–2019), American bishop
- Freya Allan (born 2001), English actress

=== G ===
- Gail Allan (born 1965), British slalom canoeist
- Gary Allan (born 1967), American country singer
- Gary Allan (speedway rider) (born 1967), New Zealand speedway rider
- George Allan (footballer, born 1875) (1875–1899), Scottish footballer
- George Allan (antiquary) (1736–1800), English antiquary and attorney
- George Allan (barrister) (1767–1828), English barrister and politician
- George Allan (cricketer) (1887–1932), Australian cricketer
- George Allan (footballer, born 1885) (1885–1916), Scottish footballer
- George Allan (composer) (1864–1930), English composer
- George Allan (footballer, born unknown), Scottish association football player
- George H. Allan (1861–1938), American politician
- George James Allan (born 1935), American philosopher
- George William Allan (1822–1901), Canadian lawyer and politician
- George William Allan (Manitoba politician) (1860–1940), Canadian politician
- Gordon Allan (born 1998), Australian Paralympic cyclist
- Graeme Allan (born 1954), Australian rules footballer
- Graham Allan (1936–2007), English mathematician
- Griselda Allan (1905–1987), English artist

=== H ===
- H. Montagu Allan (1860–1951), Canadian businessman and philanthropist
- Harold Egbert Allan (1895–1953), Jamaican politician
- Harris Allan (born 1985), Canadian actor and artist
- Harry Allan (1882–1957), New Zealand teacher, botanist, scientific administrator, writer
- Harry Allan (rugby union) (born 1997), New Zealand rugby union player
- Harry Allan (footballer) (fl. 1890s), Scottish footballer
- Heather Allan (1941–2024), New Zealand nurse, social worker, local politician and community leader
- Henry Allan (footballer) (1872–1965), Scottish footballer
- Henry Allan (painter) (1865–1912), Irish painter
- Henry Allan (cricketer) (1846–1926), Australian cricketer
- Henry William Allan (politician) (1843–1913), Canadian politician
- Henry William Allan (rugby union) (1850–1926), Scotland international rugby union player
- Hugh Allan (abbot) (born 1976), English Roman Catholic priest
- Hugh Allan (actor) (1903–1997), American actor
- Hugh Allan (politician) (1865–1949), Canadian politician

=== I ===
- Ian Allan (RAF officer) (1918–1988), British RAF officer
- Ian Allan (politician) (1916–2000), Australian politician
- Ian Allan (publisher) (1922–2015), English publisher
- Ivan Allan (1941–2009), British racehorse trainer and businessman

=== J ===
- Jacinta Allan (born 1973), Premier of Victoria since 2023
- Jack Allan (footballer, born 1886) (1886–1919), English footballer
- Jack Allan (footballer, born 1883) (born 1883), English footballer
- Jack Allan (golfer) (1876–1898), Scottish golfer
- James Alexander Allan (1879–1967), Australian poet and historian
- James Allan (Australian footballer) (born 1985), Australian rules footballer
- James Allan (Canadian politician) (1894–1992), Canadian politician
- James Allan (musician) (born 1979), Scottish singer-songwriter
- James Allan (diplomat) (1932–2018), British diplomat
- James Allan (bishop) (1928–2013), Canadian Anglican bishop
- James Allan (Queensland politician) (1856–1938), Australian politician
- James Allan (rugby union) (1860–1934), New Zealand rugby player
- James Allan (footballer, born 1866) (1866–1945), Scottish footballer
- James Allan (cricketer) (born 1972), New Zealand cricketer
- James Allan (footballer, born 1857) (1857–1911), Scottish schoolmaster, football administrator and footballer
- James Allan (law professor) (born 1960), Canadian law professor
- James Allan Jr. (1845–1932), American politician
- James Allan (computer scientist), Computer Scientist
- James McGrigor Allan (1827–1916), English anthropologist and writer
- Jamie Allan (golfer) (1861–1900), Scottish professional golfer
- Jamie Allan (magician) (born 1977), English magician
- Jan Allan (born 1934), Swedish jazz trumpeter and composer
- Jani Allan (1952–2023), South African journalist, columnist, writer and broadcaster
- Janie Allan (1868–1968), Scottish suffrage activist
- Jed Allan (1935–2019), American actor and TV host
- Jeff Allan (born 1957), Canadian ice hockey player
- Jennifer Lucy Allan, British writer, researcher and radio presenter
- Jess Allan (born 1999), Australian rules footballer
- Jim Allan (born 1960), New Zealand and Australian male curler
- Jimmy Allan (footballer, born 1896) (1897–1982), Scottish footballer and manager
- Jimmy Allan (cricketer) (1932–2005), Scottish cricketer
- Jimmy Allan (footballer, born 1953), Scottish footballer and manager
- Joanne Allan, New Zealand rugby union player
- Jock Allan (born c. 1891), Scottish footballer
- Jock Allan (rugby union) (1905–1958), Scotland international rugby union player
- John Allan (Australian politician) (1866–1936), Australian politician
- John Allan (Canadian politician) (1856–1922), Canadian politician
- John Allan (colonel) (1746–1805), Canadian politician and officer with the Massachusetts Militia
- John Allan (Canadian naval officer) (1928–2014), Canadian admiral
- John Allan (rugby union, born 1963), Scotland-born rugby union player
- John Allan (numismatist) (1884–1955), British numismatist and Sanskrit scholar
- John Allan (Australian footballer) (1879–1933), Australian rules footballer
- John Allan (businessman) (born 1948), British businessman
- John Allan (fighter) (born 1993), Brazilian mixed martial arts fighter
- John Allan (golfer) (1848–1897), Scottish golfer
- John Allan (footballer, fl. 1932–33), Scottish footballer
- John Allan (footballer, born 1890), English footballer
- John Allan (Victorian MLC) (fl. 1850s), Australian politician
- John Allan (footballer, born 1872), Scottish footballer
- John Allan (minister) (1897–1979), Presbyterian minister, professor of theology
- John Allan (footballer, born 1931) (1931–2003), Scottish footballer
- John Allan (antiquarian) (1777–1863), American antiquarian
- John Allan (Salvation Army officer) (1887–1960), Salvation Army officer
- John Allan (rugby union, born 1934), Scotland international rugby union player
- John Anthony Allan (1937–2021), British geographer
- John Beresford Allan (1841–1927), Canadian politician
- John Pearman Allan, Canadian politician from Ontario
- John R. Allan (1906–1986), Scottish journalist, broadcaster, author and farmer
- Johnnie Allan (born 1938), American singer-songwriter
- Jonny Allan (born 1983), English footballer
- Jordan Allan (born 1998), Scottish footballer
- Joyce Allan (1896–1966), Australian artist
- Julian Phelps Allan (1892–1996), English sculptor
- Julianna Allan, Australian actress

=== K ===
- Kailey Allan (born 2003), Canadian luger
- Keegan Allan (born 2001), South African soccer player
- Keith Allan (actor) (born 1969), American actor
- Keith Allan (linguist) (born 1943), Australian linguist
- Kim Allan (born 1966), New Zealand long-distance runner
- Kirby Allan (1928–2011), American record producer
- Kiri Allan (born 1984), New Zealand politician
- Kirsty Lee Allan (born 1984), Australian actress and fashion model

=== L ===
- Lauren Allan (born 1996), Australian soccer player
- Laurie Allan (born 1943), English drummer
- Lee Allan (born 1991), New Zealand rugby union player
- Les Allan (1927–2013), Scotland international rugby union player
- Lewis Allan (footballer) (born 1996), Scottish footballer
- Liz Allan (cricketer) (born 1948), New Zealand cricketer
- Lucy Allan (producer) (born 1978), English television producer
- Lucy Allan (politician) (born 1964), British politician

=== M ===
- Mabel Esther Allan (1915–1998), British author
- Madge Allan, English lawn bowler
- Malcolm Allan (1900–1974), Scottish rugby union player and referee
- Marcus Allan (born 1986), Australian rules footballer
- Margaret Allan (racing driver) (1909–1998), Scottish motor racing driver
- Margaret Allan (romance author) (1922–2017), British author of romance novels
- Margaret Theadora Allan (1889–1968), Australian community worker
- Marguerite Allan (1905–1994), British actress
- Marie Allan (born 1979), French actress
- Martha Allan (1895–1942), Canadian theatre figure
- Mary Allan (British academic) (1869–1947), Scottish academic and educator
- Mary Parsons Reid Allan (1917–2002), Scottish artist
- Matthew Allan (born 1975), Australian rules footballer
- Matthew Allan (baseball) (born 2001), American baseball player
- Maud Allan (1873–1956), Canadian dancer and choreographer
- Maurice Allan (born 1945), British wrestler
- Mea Allan (1909–1982), British writer, journalist and biographer
- Michael Allan (born 1983), American football player
- Mick Allan (1938–2021), Australian rower
- Micky Allan (born 1944), Australian photographer and painter
- Miriam Allan (born 1977), Australian soprano
- Mitch Allan (born 1972), American record producer and songwriter
- Mitchell Allan (born 1987), Australian snowboarder

=== N ===
- Nancy Allan (born 1952), Canadian politician
- Nicholas Allan (born 1956), British children's writer and illustrator
- Nicol Allan (1931–2019), American artist
- Nina Allan (born 1966), British writer of speculative fiction
- Nolan Allan (born 2003), Canadian ice hockey player
- Norman Allan (1909-1977), Australian police officer

=== O ===
- Ollie Allan (born 2004), English rugby union player

=== P ===
- Pam Allan (born 1953), Australian politician
- Patricia Allan (born 1938), New Zealand nurse and Anglican vicar
- Patrick Allan (1892–1955), Scottish footballer
- Paul Allan (born 2000), Scottish footballer
- Percy Allan (1861–1930), Australian civil engineer
- Peter Allan (Australian cricketer) (1935–2023), Australian cricketer
- Peter Allan (landlord) (1799–1849), English recluse and eccentric
- Peter Allan (rugby union) (born 1975), Scottish rugby union referee
- Peter Allan (footballer) (1935–1987), Australian rules footballer
- Peter Allan (priest) (born 1950), British Anglican priest and monk
- Peter John Allan (1825–1848), Canadian poet
- Philip Bertram Murray Allan (1884–1973), British lepidopterist, writer and publisher

=== R ===
- Ray Allan (born 1955), Scottish footballer
- Richard Allan (actor) (1923–1999), American actor and dancer
- Richard Van Allan (1935–2008), British operatic bass singer
- Richie Allan (born 1975), Australian rugby league footballer
- Rob Allan (1945–2021), New Zealand poet
- Robert Allan (mineralogist) (1806–1863), British geologist
- Robert Allan (poet) (1774–1841), Scottish poet
- Robert Allan (trade unionist), Scottish trade unionist
- Robert Allan (businessman) (1846–1927), New Zealand businessman and manufacturer
- Robert Allan (footballer), English footballer
- Robert George Allan (1879–1972), British agricultural administrator
- Robert M. Allan (1880–1965), American politician
- Robert Weir Allan (1851–1942), English artist
- Robin Allan (1900–1966), New Zealand geologist and university professor
- Ron Allan (1924–1997), Australian rules footballer
- Rosemary Allan (1911–2008), British painter
- Rosetta Allan, New Zealand writer

=== S ===
- Salem Allan (1914–1981), Bahraini singer
- Sandy Allan (born 1947), Scottish footballer
- Sarah Allan (footballer) (born 1997), Australian rules footballer
- Sarah Allan (born 1945), American historian
- Sarah Campbell Allan (1861–1954), First female doctor in South Carolina
- Scott Allan (born 1991), Scottish footballer
- Scott Allan (sailor) (born 1946), American sailor
- Scotty Allan (1867–1941), Scottish-born American dog musher, businessman, and politician
- Stephen Allan (born 1973), Australian professional golfer
- Steven Allan (born 1956), Australian rules footballer
- Stu Allan (1962–2022), British DJ
- Stuart Allan (born 1998), American actor

=== T ===
- Tahar Allan, Algerian politician
- Ted Allan (1916–1995), Canadian writer
- Thomas Allan (mineralogist) (1777–1833), British mineralogist
- Thomas Allan (publisher) (1832–1894), English song collector and publisher
- Thomas Allan (footballer, born 1999) (born 1999), English footballer
- Thomas Allan (politician) (1725–1798), Irish politician
- Thomas Allan (Scottish footballer), Scottish footballer
- Thomas G. Allan Jr. (born 1965), U.S. Coast Guard flag officer
- Thomas J. Allan (1940–1966), British radio engineer
- Thomson Allan (born 1946), Scottish footballer
- Tim Allan (born 1970), British public relations consultant
- Tim Allan (Canadian football) (born 1955), Canadian football offensive tackle
- Tom Allan (footballer) (born 1994), English footballer
- Tom Allan (minister) (1916–1965), British minister
- Tom Allan (Methodist) (1864–1932), Methodist minister in Western Australia
- Tommaso Allan (born 1993), Italy international rugby union player
- Tony Allan (jockey), New Zealand jockey
- Tony Allan (1949-2004), British broadcaster
- Trevor Allan (rugby) (1926–2007), Australian rugby player
- Trevor Allan (legal philosopher) (born 1955), British legal scholar
- Trevor Allan (tennis) (born 1955), Australian tennis player

=== V ===
- Virginia Allan (1916–1999), American educator and activist

=== W ===
- Wal Allan (fl. 1920s), Australian rugby league footballer
- Walter Allan (1927–2003), Scottish cricketer and medical doctor
- Wanda Allan (born 1955), Canadian archer
- Watty Allan (1868–1943), Scottish footballer
- William Allan (painter) (1782–1850), Scottish artist
- William Allan (banker) (c. 1770 – 1853), Canadian banker, businessman and politician
- William Allan (English politician) (1837–1903), British politician
- William Allan (Queensland politician) (1840–1901), Australian politician
- William Allan (classicist) (born 1970), Scottish classicist
- William Allan (geneticist) (1881–1943), American physician and geneticist
- William Allan (trade unionist) (1813–1874), British trade unionist
- William Allan (British Army officer) (1832–1918), British general
- William Allan (footballer, born 1880) (1880–1965), Scottish footballer
- William Allan (footballer, born 1904) (1904–1969), Scottish footballer
- William Evan Allan (1899–2005), Australian centenarian
- Willie Allan (1942–2026), Scottish footballer
- Willie Allan (racing driver) (1930-2019), American Dirt Modified racing driver

== Fictional characters ==
- Zack Allan, a fictional character from the television series Babylon 5

== See also ==
- Allan (disambiguation)
- Allan (given name)
- Alan (surname)
- Allen (surname)
