= John Allan =

John, Johnnie or Johnny Allan may refer to:

== Politics ==
- John Allan (Canadian politician) (1856–1922), Canadian politician, member for Hamilton West, 1914–1919
- John Allan (Australian politician) (1866–1936), Premier of Victoria, 1924–1927
- John Beresford Allan (1841–1927), politician in Manitoba, Canada
- John Allan (Victorian MLC), colonial Victorian politician

== Sports ==
- John Allan (golfer) (1847–1897), Scottish golfer
- John Allan (footballer, born 1872) (1872–?), footballer for Derby County and Notts County
- Jack Allan (golfer) (1875–1898), Scottish amateur golfer (Alexander John Travers Allan)
- John Allan (Australian footballer) (1882–1933), Australian rules footballer for Collingwood
- Jack Allan (footballer, born 1883) (1883–?), Manchester United footballer (John Thomas Allan)
- John Allan (footballer, born 1890) (1890–?), footballer for Everton, Leeds City and Coventry City, also known as Jack Allan
- Jock Allan (John Allan, c. 1891-?), Scottish footballer
- John Allan (footballer, fl. 1932–33), Scottish footballer for Hamilton Academical
- John Allan (footballer, born 1931) (1931–2003), Scottish footballer for Dunfermline Athletic, Aberdeen, Third Lanark and Bradford PA
- John Allan (rugby union, born 1934), Scottish rugby union player
- John Allan (rugby union, born 1963), Scottish and South African rugby union player
- John Allan (fighter) (born 1993), Brazilian mixed martial artist

== Other ==
- John Allan (antiquarian) (1777–1863), Scottish-born American antiquarian
- John Allan (businessman) (born 1948), former chairman of Tesco
- John Allan (Canadian naval officer) (1928–2014), Canadian admiral
- John Allan (colonel) (1746–1805), participant in the American Revolutionary War in the Massachusetts Militia
- John Allan (minister) (1897–1979), New Zealand Presbyterian minister and professor of theology
- John Allan (numismatist) (1884–1955), British numismatist
- John Allan (Salvation Army officer) (1887–1949), 8th Chief of the Staff of the Salvation Army and U.S. Army colonel
- John Anthony Allan (1937–2021), British geographer
- John R. Allan (1906–1986), Scottish journalist, broadcaster, author, and farmer
- Johnnie Allan (born 1938), American swamp pop musician

== See also ==
- Jonny Allan (born 1983), English footballer
- James Allan (footballer, born 1866) (1866–1945), footballer for Queen's Park and Scotland (also known as John Allan)
- John Allen (disambiguation)
- Jack Allan (disambiguation)
