= George Allan =

George Allan may refer to:

== Politics and law ==
- George Allan (antiquary) (1736–1800), English antiquary and attorney
- George Allan (barrister) (1767–1828), English politician, son of the antiquary
- George H. Allan (1861–1938), American attorney and politician from Maine
- George William Allan (1822–1901), Canadian politician
- George William Allan (Manitoba politician) (1860–1940), Canadian politician

== Others ==
- George Allan (cricketer) (1887–1932), Australian cricketer
- George Allan (footballer, born 1875) (1875–1899), Scottish footballer (Liverpool FC, Celtic, national team)
- George Allan (footballer, born 1885) (1885–1916), Scottish footballer (Partick Thistle, Ayr United)
- George Allan (footballer, born unknown) (fl. 1890s), Scottish footballer
- George Allan (composer) (1864–1930), composer and arranger of music for brass bands
- George James Allan (born 1935), American philosopher

== See also ==
- George Allen (disambiguation)
