= Alexander Allan =

Alexander Allan or Allen may refer to:

== Politics and law ==
- Sir Alexander Allan, 1st Baronet (c. 1764–1820), British politician, Member of Parliament for Berwick-upon-Tweed
- Alexander Allen (politician) (1842–1924), American politician in the state of Washington
- Alex Allan (born 1951), British civil servant

== Sports ==
- Scotty Allan or Allan Alexander Allan (1867–1941), Scottish-born American dog musher
- Jack Allan (golfer) (1875–1898), Scottish amateur golfer (Alexander John Travers Allan)
- Alex Allan (footballer) (fl. 1910s), Scottish footballer
- Alex Allen (baseball) (fl. 1940s), Negro league baseball player
- Sandy Allen (cricketer) (born 1984), English cricketer
- Alex Allan (rugby union) (born 1992), Scotland rugby union player

== Others ==
- Alexander Allan (ship owner) (1780–1854), Scottish sea captain and businessman
- Alexander Allan (locomotive engineer) (1809–1891), Scottish mechanical engineer
- Alexander Allen (writer) (1814–1842), English writer and linguist
- Alexander Viets Griswold Allen (1841–1908), American theologian
- Florence Parry Heide (pen name "Alex B. Allen", 1919–2011), American children's author
- Alexander J. Allen (fl. 1930s), American physicist, namesake of Allen Hall (University of Pittsburgh)
- Alexander Allen (stylist) (active since 2001), American fashion stylist

== See also ==
- Allan (disambiguation)
- Allen (surname)
