= Walter Allen (disambiguation) =

Walter Allen (1911–1995) was an English literary critic and novelist.

Walter Allen or Allan may also refer to:

- Walter R. Allen (fl. 1990s–2020s), American sociologist
- Jack Allen (footballer, born 1889) (1889–1948), English footballer
- Walter Allan (1927–2003), Scottish cricketer and surgeon
- Watty Allan (Walter Lennie Allan, 1868–1943), Scottish footballer

== See also ==
- Wal Allan, or Allen, Australian rugby league player
