= Cecilia García =

Cecilia García may refer to:

- Cecilia García Arocha (born 1953), rector of the Central University of Venezuela
- Cecilia García de Guilarte (1915–1989), Spanish writer
- Cecilia Garcia-Penalosa, Spanish economist
