= Alan (surname) =

The surname Alan is a variant spelling of Allan and Allen. According to one source, Alan is a variant of the English surname Allain.

There is also the given name of Alan.

== People with the surname Alan ==
- A. J. Alan, English magician, intelligence officer, short story writer and radio broadcaster
- Ahmad Alan, Palestinian footballer
- Ali Rıza Alan, Turkish wrestler
- Buddy Alan, American country musician
- Chad Alan, American vocalist and bass guitarist
- Engin Alan, Turkish general
- Hervey Alan, English operatic bass and voice teacher
- John Alan, English-born statesman in Ireland
- Jordan Alan, American film director-producer and television-commercial director
- Joshua Alan, American singer-songwriter and musician
- Lori Alan, American actress and voice actress
- Magic Matt Alan, American radio personality
- Mark Alan, American actor and film producer
- Matthew Alan, American actor
- Michael Alan, artist of drawings, paintings, prints, sculptures, video and performances
- Paul Alan, singer and songwriter
- Ray Alan, English ventriloquist and television entertainer
- Scott Alan, American songwriter
- Steven Alan, American fashion designer

== See also ==
- Allan (surname), people with surname Allan
- Allen (surname), people with surname Allen
- Alan (given name), people with given name Alan
- FitzAlan, a Breton and then English surname
