= Jack Allen =

Jack Allen may refer to:

- Jack Allen (actor) (1907–1995), British actor
- Jack Allen (footballer, born 1889) (1889–1948), English footballer
- Jack Allen (footballer, born 1891) (1891–1971), English football player for Glossop, Manchester City, Southport and Crewe Alexandra
- Jack Allen (footballer, born 1903) (1903–1957), English football player
- Jack Allen (Australian footballer) (1887–1956), Australian rules footballer
- Jack Allen (Northern Ireland politician), Unionist in Northern Ireland
- John F. Allen (physicist) (1908–2001), physicist
- Jack Allen (Adventures in Odyssey), character in a Christian-themed comedy-drama
- Jack Allen (baseball) (1855–1915), baseball player
- Jack Allen (American football) (born 1992), American football player
- Jack Allen (Canadian politician) (1909–1992), reeve of East York in Toronto (1957–1960)

== See also ==
- Jack Allan (disambiguation)
- John Allen (disambiguation)
- Allen (surname)
