= George Allen =

George Allen may refer to:

== Politics and law ==
- George E. Allen (1896–1973), American political operative and one-time head coach of the Cumberland University football team
- George Allen (Australian politician) (1800–1877), Mayor of Sydney and NSW politician
- George Allen (American politician) (born 1952), former Virginia Governor and U.S. Senator
- George Allen (New Zealand politician) (1814–1899), Mayor of Wellington, New Zealand, for three weeks
- George Allen, founding partner of international law firm Allen & Overy
- George E. Allen Sr. (1885–1972), Virginia state senator and U.S. Supreme Court trial attorney
- George E. Allen Jr. (1914–1990), Virginia attorney
- George R. Allen (1838–1901), Wisconsin state assemblyman
- George V. Allen (1903–1970), United States diplomat
- George W. Allen (judge) (1844–1928), associate justice and chief justice of the Colorado Supreme Court
- George Wigram Allen (1824–1885), Australian politician
- George Baugh Allen (1821–1898), Welsh lawyer
- George Van Allen (1890–1937), provincial politician from Alberta, Canada
- George L. Allen (1811–1882), Toronto chief constable (1847–1852), governor of Toronto Jail (1852–1872)
- George Allen (public servant) (1852–1940), Australian public servant
- W. George Allen (1936–2019), first African-American to graduate from the University of Florida School of Law

== Sports ==
- George Allen (defensive tackle) (1944–1987), American college and professional football player
- George Allen (American football coach) (1918–1990), American football coach
- George E. Allen (coach) (1911–1997), American football player and coach of football and basketball
- George Allen (footballer, born 1932) (1932–2016), English footballer
- George Allen (footballer, born 1948) (1948–1971), Australian rules footballer for Sunshine
- George Allen (footballer, born 1928) (1928–1995), Australian rules footballer for South Melbourne
- George Allen (ice hockey) (1914–2000), Canadian ice hockey player
- Gubby Allen (Sir George Oswald Browning Allen, 1902–1989), Australian-born English cricketer
- George Allen (cricketer) (1949–1990), West Indian cricketer

== Other ==
- George Allen (architect) (1837–1929), New Zealand architect, surveyor, teacher and tourist guide
- George Allen (ichthyologist) (1923–2011), American scientist, Professor at Humboldt State University
- George Allen (publisher) (1832–1907), English craftsman and engraver, assistant to John Ruskin
- George Allen (sculptor) (1900–1972), Australian war artist
- George Allen (Vermont clergyman) (1808–1876), college professor and clergyman
- George Allen and Sons, publishers
- George C. Allen II, American general
- George Cyril Allen (1900–1982), British economist
- George Nelson Allen (1812–1877), American composer and geologist
- George Vance Allen (1894–1970), first Vice-Chancellor of the University of Malaya
- George W. G. Allen (1891–1940), pioneered aerial photography for archaeological research
- George Warner Allen (1916–1988), British artist

== See also ==
- George Allan (disambiguation)
- Georg Frederik Ferdinand Allen (1856–1925), Danish singing teacher, conductor and composer
