= Center for Distributive, Labor and Social Studies =

Research centre in La Plata, Argentina

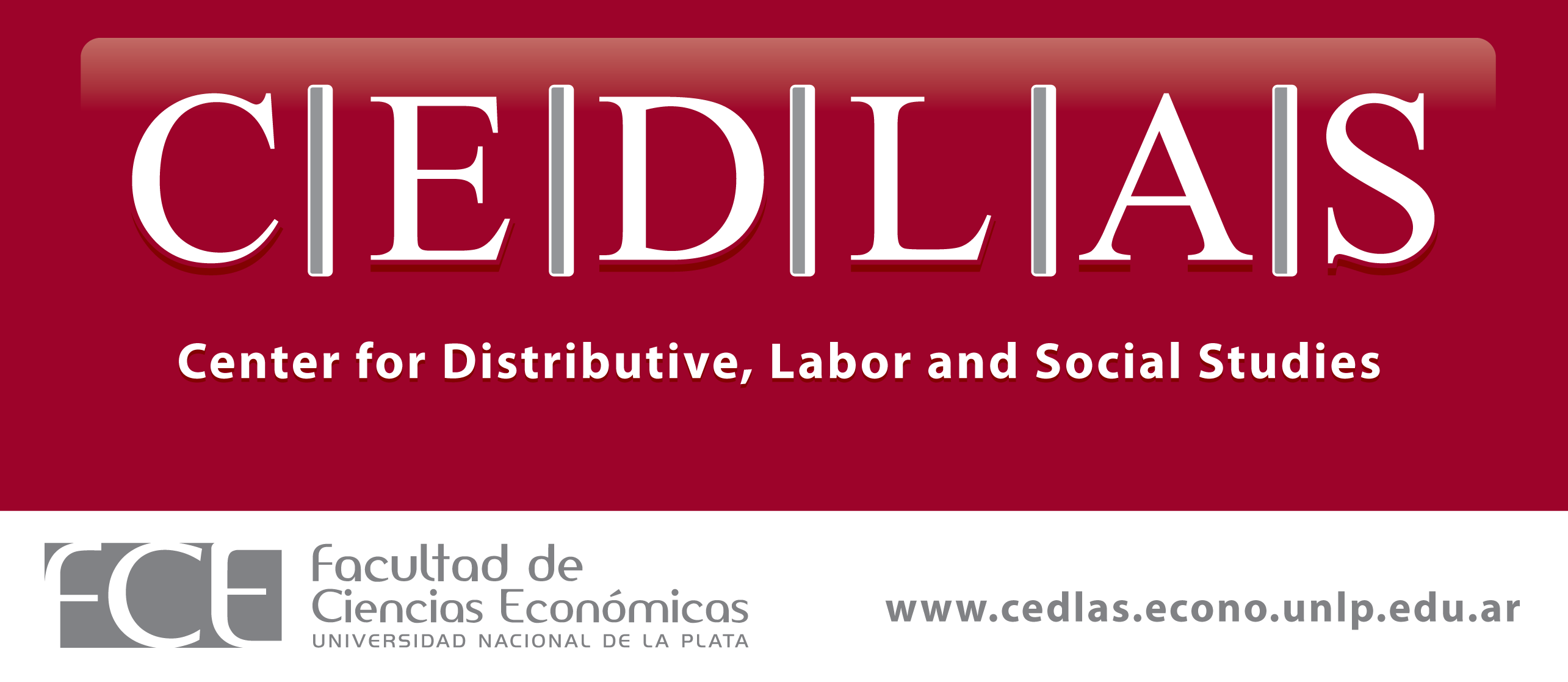
- Established: 2002
- Type: Research Centre
- Legal status: Active
- Headquarters: La Plata, Argentina
- Director: Leonardo Gasparini
- Deputy Director: Guillermo Cruces
- Deputy Director: Martín Cicowiez
- Website: CEDLAS official site

The Center for Distributive, Labor and Social Studies (CEDLAS) is a research center specialising in distribution, labor and social issues in Latin America.

== Agenda ==
The Center was formally created in 2002 within the Economics Department of the National University of La Plata (UNLP). It specialises in policy and applied empirical research on distributive and labor issues based on microdata from household surveys in Latin America and the Caribbean. The work carried out by its researchers covers also a wider range of issues and geographic areas, as witnessed by the Center's collection of working papers and the research projects carried out since 2002 for a host of international organizations, national governments and research institutions.

Since its inception, the Center has been responsible for the development and maintenance of the Socio-Economic Database for Latin America and the Caribbean (SEDLAC), a joint project with the World Bank. Social and distributive indicators from SEDLAC are used by the World Bank's World Development Indicators and feature in the United Nations' WIDER World Income Inequality Database.

== Members ==
CEDLAS staff includes senior and junior researchers, research assistants and post-graduate students from the UNLP School of Economics.

Senior Research Team Members:

- Leonardo Gasparini, Director. Ph.D. in economics, Princeton University
- Guillermo Cruces, Deputy Director. Ph.D. in economics, London School of Economics and Political Science
- Martín Cicowiez, Deputy Director. Dr. en Economía, National University of La Plata
- Javier Alejo. Dr. en Economía, National University of La Plata
- María Laura Alzúa. Ph.D. in economics, Boston University
- Ricardo Bebczuk. Ph.D. in economics, Illinois University at Urbana-Champaign
- Joaquín Coleff. Ph.D. in economics, Carlos III University of Madrid
- Facundo Crosta. Dr. en Economía, National University of La Plata
- Santiago Garganta. Dr. en Economía, National University of La Plata
- Pablo Glüzmann. Dr. en Economía, National University of La Plata
- Mariana Marchionni. Dra. en Economía, National University of La Plata
- Ana Pacheco. Dra. en Economía, National University of La Plata
- Guido Porto. Ph.D. in economics, Princeton University
- Walter Sosa Escudero. Ph.D. in economics, Illinois University at Urbana-Champaign
- Leopoldo Tornarolli. Mg. en Economía, National University of La Plata
- Mariana Viollaz. Dra. en Economía, National University of La Plata

The members of CEDLAS actively participate in several academic and professional associations, such as the Network of Inequality and Poverty (NIP), the Society for the Study of Economic Inequality (ECINEQ), the Latin American and Caribbean Economic Association (LACEA), the International Development Research Centre (IDRC), the Latin, Poverty and Economic Policy Network (PEP), the Global Development Network (GDN), the Latin American and Caribbean Research Network from BID, the Alliance for Health Policy and Systems Research, Asociación Argentina de Economía Política (AAEP) and Asociación Argentina de Políticas Sociales (AAPS).

== Activities ==
- Applied and theoretical poverty, inequality and income distribution analysis.
- Applied labor economics in development countries, informality, unemployment and labor market policies.
- Impact evaluation of social programs and policies.
- Social protection, income transfers and other welfare programs.
- Computable general equilibrium models
- Harmonization of microdata from household surveys.
- Design and implementation of surveys.
- Courses in Argentina and abroad, in cooperation with different organizations, such as the International Development Research Centre (IDRC), Inter-American Development Bank, International Labor Organization (ILO), GRADE, the Think Tank project, the Government of Nicaragua, the Government of Peru, the Government of Ecuador, the Government of Paraguay, and the Government of Dominican Republic.
- Organization and participation in conferences such as the LACEA/IADB/ WB/UNDP Research Network on Inequality and Poverty (NIP) meeting, the annual meeting of Impact Evaluation Network (IEN) and the annual meeting of Asociación Argentina de Economía Política (AAEP).

== Publications ==
=== Working Papers ===
The CEDLAS Working Paper Series is a monthly publication that includes research and academic papers written at CEDLAS, as well as M.A. in Economics (UNLP) dissertations in topics related to those studied at CEDLAS.

Main Topics
Topic	%
Poverty and Inequality	37.0
Labor Market and Employment	22.7
Evaluation of Public Policies	12.0
Education and Health	12.0
Macro, Finance and Poverty	5.0
Trade and Poverty	3.9
Millennium Development Goals	3.1
General Equilibrium	3.1
Others	1.2

The series began in September 2003 and since then has not been interrupted, reaching 198 documents in May 2016. A total of 175 authors have participated, 57 are or have been CEDLAS researchers. The rest of them consist of visiting and research associates, graduates of the Master in Economics from the UNLP and other external authors.

The CEDLAS' working papers cover a set of topics in the social area, focusing on the empirical analysis of poverty and inequality in Latin America, the study of labor markets and the evaluation of public policies.

Some of them have been published in leading journals such as Journal of Public Economics, Economic Development and Cultural Change, Review of Income and Wealth, The Journal of Economic Inequality, Journal of Income Distribution, Oxford Development Studies, Economic Bulletin and Económica, among others.

Additionally, these Working Papers appear in the Research Papers in Economics (RePEc), the largest bibliographic database in Economics. According to statistics from RePEc CEDLAS documents were downloaded 15,199 times from that site.

All Working Papers are available here.

=== Other publications ===
==== The book "Pobreza y Desigualdad en América Latina - Conceptos, Herramientas y Aplicaciones" ====
This book has been written by Leonardo Gasparini, Martín Cicowiez and Walter Sosa Escudero. It contains the main conceptual topics of discussion about poverty and inequality, offering analytic tools applied to household survey data from every Latin American country.

Every chapter includes an appendix with Stata commands so as the readers could replicate the results and the first two chapters of the book, additional material and authors' information are available here.

== Research Projects ==
=== Socio-Economic Database for Latin America and the Caribbean (SEDLAC) ===
The Center for Distributional, Labor and Social Studies (CEDLAS) of the University of La Plata, in partnership with the World Bank Latin America and the Caribbean Poverty and Gender Group (LCSPP), have developed the Socio-Economic Database for Latin America and the Caribbean (SEDLAC) with the purpose of improving the timely access to key socio-economic statistics, including indicators on poverty, inequality, income, employment, access to services, education, health, housing, social programs, and numerous demographics. All statistics are computed from microdata of the main household surveys carried out in the countries.

Household surveys are not uniform among countries of Latin America and the Caribbean. In particular, they differ significantly in their geographic coverage and questionnaires. There are also differences in the periodicity of surveys within a country.

This project seeks to ensure that statistics are comparable, as far as possible, between countries and over time. This is done using similar definitions of variables in each country/year and applying consistent methods of data processing. In this way SEDLAC allows users to monitor the trends in poverty and other distributional and social indicators in the region. The dataset is available in the form of brief reports, charts and electronic Excel tables with information for each country/year. In addition, the website visitor can carry out dynamic searches online in the official website.

This website presents enough documentation so that each user decides whether or not to make comparisons, considering the available information, their preferences and needs. The Methodological Guide describes the tables available in each section of the database, and discusses the main methodological decisions taken to construct the variables.

This section contains methodological documents with precise explanations of the construction and estimation of each variable, the countries and surveys analyzed, and the period covered in the SEDLAC database.

The database includes information from over 300 household surveys carried out in 24 LAC countries: Argentina, Bahamas, Belize, Bolivia, Brazil, Colombia, Costa Rica, Chile, Dominican Republic, Ecuador, El Salvador, Guatemala, Guyana, Haiti, Honduras, Jamaica, Mexico, Nicaragua, Panama, Paraguay, Peru, Suriname, Uruguay and Venezuela. In each period the sample of countries represents more than 97% of LAC total population. The database mainly covers the 1990s and 2000s, although they also present information for previous decades in a few countries.

SEDLAC is continually updated and improved based on the feedback from users. Aside from cross country analyses, staff from CEDLAS and LCSPP analyze and incorporate the data at the country level each time a new survey is available. Consistency checks with other national or international sources of socio-economic statistics are conducted regularly.

Through the support to this project LCSPP contributes to develop analytical capacity and facilitate policy relevant research in the Latin America and Caribbean region that can contribute to reduce poverty and inequality. Social and distributive indicators from these dataset are used for the World Bank World Development Indicators and published in the WIDER-UN World Income Inequality Database.

=== Labor markets for inclusive growth in Latin America ===
The Center for Distributional, Labor and Social Studies (CEDLAS) in cooperation with the International Development Research Centre (IDRC) from Canada, have developed a research project about the role of the labor market as vectors of inclusive growth in Latin America. It will seek to account for the implications of changes in labor supply, firm employment demand, labor market policies and partial social protection reforms.

The research and capacity building agenda lies at the intersection of labor supply and demand perspectives, which have addressed these issues separately in the existing literature for the region. The project will contribute to bridge the two approaches by jointly developing a series of studies at the worker and at the firm levels. This research agenda will provide evidence on the inter-relation between social protection reforms, informality, poverty reduction, labor market regulations, crises, job creation and productivity. All the Project studies, the rest of the activities, labor market indicators and maps can be found in the project's website.

=== Enhancing Women's Economic Empowerment through Better Policies in Latin America ===
The Interdisciplinary Center for Development Studies-Uruguay, CIEDUR, with the Center for Distributional, Labor and Social Studies (CEDLAS) in Argentina and the support the International Development Research Centre (IDRC) from Canada, are working together in the development of this research project. The project's objective is to improve the efficiency and effectiveness of policies that promote gender equality in labor markets.

The reality of eight Latin American countries like Argentina, Chile, Ecuador, Bolivia, El Salvador, Mexico, Nicaragua and Uruguay, are being studied applying an innovative mix of research methods, including econometrics models, impact evaluation of the policies, meta analysis and depth interviews.

The project will provide country level and comparative empirical evidence that will serve as inputs to improve the efficiency and effectiveness of policies that promote gender equality. The comparative analysis of countries, which all experienced sustained economic growth, will provide insights into the factors that contribute to the persistence of gender inequalities amidst such growth, and the role of institutional frameworks and policies that could have a major impact to tackle them.

In the project's website are the research findings, the projects activities and data including visualization tools.

=== Fostering capacities in Impact Evaluation in Latin America ===
With the support of the International Development Research Centre (IDRC-Canada), CEDLAS will aim to develop a capacity building initiative based on training courses on impact evaluation, scholarships and other activities to foster professional education. The objective is to provide training activities in impact evaluation in the region on a regular basis. More information can be found in the website.

== Awards and Distinctions ==
Members of CEDLAS have been recognized with a variety of awards and distinctions locally and around the world.

- The 9° Premio Anual de Investigación Económica "Dr. Raúl Prebisch" awarded by the Central Bank of Argentina, won by Mariana Viollaz (2015).
- The Best of UNICEF Research 2015 Award to María Laura Alzúa, 2015.
- The Premio a la Labor Científica, Tecnológica y Artística (2014) to Pablo Gluzmann, from the National University of La Plata.
- ANCE Award 2013 to Pablo Gluzmann, Eduardo Levy Yeyati and Federico Sturzenegger for their paper "Fear of appreciation".
- ANCE Award 2013 to Guillermo Cruces, Ricardo Pérez-Truglia and Martín Tetaz, for their article "Biased perceptions of income distribution and preferences for redistribution: Evidence from a survey experiment" published in the Journal of Public Economics (electronic edition November 12, 2012, Elsevier, vol. 98(C), pages 100-112.).
- The Premio a la Labor Científica, Tecnológica y Artística (2012) to Leonardo Gasparini, in recognition to his contribution regarding the development of scientific, technological and artistic research.
- The Prize Fundación Vidanta 2012 won by Guillermo Cruces and Leonardo Gasparini for their project "Políticas sociales para la reducción de la desigualdad y la pobreza en América Latina y el Caribe. Diagnóstico, propuesta y proyecciones en base a la experiencia reciente".
- The Premio Interamericano a la Investigación en Seguridad Social 2011 from the Inter-American Center for Social Security Studies (CIESS), won by Leonardo Gasparini and Santiago Garganta for the paper "El impacto de un programa social sobre la informalidad laboral: el caso de la AUH en Argentina".
- The Premio Interamericano a la Investigación en Seguridad Social 2011 from the Inter-American Center for Social Security Studies (CIESS), won by Marcelo Bérgolo and Guillermo Cruces for the paper "Labor Informality and the Incentive Effects of Social Security: Evidence from a Health Reform in Uruguay".
- The 5° Premio Anual de Investigación Económica "Dr. Raúl Prebisch" awarded by the Central Bank of Argentina, in the Young Professionals category, won by Pablo Gluzmann and Martín Guzmán for their paper "Tensiones en la ejecución de políticas de los bancos centrales en la búsqueda del desarrollo económico" (2011).
- The Guggenheim Foundation Fellowship (2008) gotten by Leonardo Gasparini for his studies on poverty and income inequality in Latin America.
- The contest Ayudas a la Investigación 2007 of the Fundación Carolina of Spain, won by Guillermo Cruces for the project "Encuesta de Percepciones Distributivas y Redistribución".
- The Premio Arcor 2001 won by Leonardo Gasparini, Mariana Marchionni and Walter Sosa Escudero for their paper "La Distribución del Ingreso en la Argentina".
