= Shildon Railway Institute =

Workers organisation in Shildon

The Shildon Railway Institute, sometimes referred to as The Stute, is a historic membership organisation and building in Shildon, County Durham, England. Founded in 1833, and has been claimed to have been the first such institute established specifically for the benefit of railway workers and their families. The Institute has operated continuously since its foundation and is associated with the early development of the Stockton and Darlington Railway, the world’s first public steam-hauled railway.

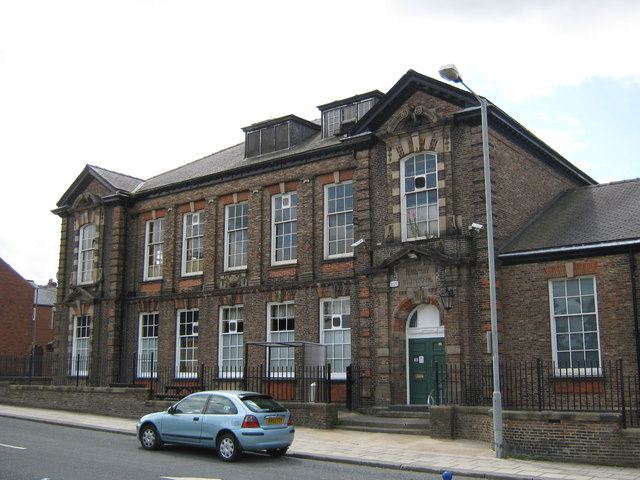
Shildon Railway Institute, Redworth Road, Shildon

== History ==
=== Foundation (1833) ===
The Institute originated as the Shildon Library for the Promotion of Useful Knowledge, founded at a meeting in late 1833 at New Shildon. The initiative was founded by senior figures associated with the Stockton and Darlington Railway (S&DR); the engineer Timothy Hackworth, and the then clerk Thomas MacNay, who became the Institute’s first secretary. Hackworth served as the first president. The inspiration for the Institution had been the work of the Society for the Diffusion of Useful Knowledge which had been founded principally by the Whig MP, Lord Henry Brougham in 1826. Stockton & Darlington Railway Company director Joseph Pease, who became patron to the Shildon institution at its founding, was Member of Parliament for South Durham at the same time as Brougham was a Whig peer in the House of Lords

The organisation was established in response to concerns about the moral, educational and professional development of railway workers in the rapidly expanding industrial settlement of New Shildon.

=== Early premises and organisation ===
For its first nine years, the Institute occupied shared accommodation, initially meeting in a Wesleyan Methodist schoolroom on Chapel Street.

During the early 1840s, the organisation adopted the structure and title of a Mechanics’ Institute, aligning it with a national movement promoting adult education for working men. In 1842, following the opening of the Shildon tunnel, (the Prince of Wales Tunnel) under Old Shildon, the Institute secured its first dedicated reading room in surplus accommodation at the former Masons Arms, previously used as a railway booking office.

In 1860 a new dedicated hall for the institute at Shildon was built on Station Street by the Stockton & Darlington Railway Company and leased to the organisation for £1 per year. This premises was expanded in 1885 when the company acquired and annexed an adjacent house.

=== Education and lectures ===
From 1885 the Institute functioned as a centre for adult education in Shildon. It hosted evening classes in scientific, technical, literary, arts and social subjects as well as ambulance classes to ensure the necessary skills in the event of accidents at the nearby heavy engineering centre of Shildon Railway Works.

=== Expansion and twentieth century ===
The hall on Station Street was beset with structural problems such that by 1906 the membership of the institute petitioned the building's then owners, the North Eastern Railway Company, to take action. The railway company began tendering for contractors to erect a new building in 1908 after having plans approved by local authorities in May that year, but it was not until 8 February 1913 that the new Shildon Railway Institute building, designed by the company's chief architect, William Bell of York was opened by company director Sir Arthur Pease and chief mechanical engineer Vincent Raven.

Following the closure of Shildon Railway Works in 1984, and with railway privatisation looming, the Shildon Railway Institute building was sold by British Rail to its members for £1, with the transfer becoming official on 23 August 1985.

Major anniversaries have been marked publicly, including its 100th anniversary in 1933, which was marked by the then building owners, the London and North Eastern Railway Company with an exhibition of locomotives and rolling stock, and the installation of a centenary plaque, and more latterly its 190th anniversary in 2023.

== Notable Members ==
- Timothy Hackworth - founder and first president, railway locomotive designer and mechanical engineer.
- Thomas MacNay - founder and first secretary, later secretary of the Stockton & Darlington Railway Company.
- William Bouch - institute treasurer, manager of Shildon Works, locomotive designer and mechanical engineer - brother of Thomas Bouch.
- Daniel Adamson - boilermaker, engineer, entrepreneur and Chairman of the Manchester Ship Canal Company.
- James Hayes Raper - one time apprentice engineer, orator and temperance lobbyist for the United Kingdom Alliance.
- William Denton - one time apprentice engineer, teacher and later professor of Geology.
- Thomas Edward Bulch - railway blacksmith, composer and bandmaster.
- George Allan - blacksmith's striker and wagon painter, bandmaster and composer of brass band marches.

== See also ==
- Stockton and Darlington Railway
- Mechanics’ institutes
- Shildon
