= Walhallow =

Walhallow may refer to:

- Walhallow, New South Wales, a village in New South Wales, Australia
- Walhallow, Queensland, a locality in the Maranoa Region, Queensland, Australia
- Walhallow Station (formerly Walhallow Downs), a cattle station in the Northern Territory, Australia
