= Sandra Allen =

Sandra Allen may refer to:

- Sandra Allen (artist) (born 1959), American artist
- Sandy Allen (1955–2008), former World's Tallest Woman
- Sandy Allen (D.C. Council) (born c. 1943), politician in Washington, D.C.
- Sandy Lewis (softball) (born 1978), maiden name Allen

== See also ==
- Sandy Allen (disambiguation)
