= Margaret Allan =

Margaret Allan may refer to:

- Margaret Allan (racing driver) (1909–1998), Scottish motor racing driver and journalist
- Margaret Allan (romance author) (1922–2017), English author of romantic fiction
- Margaret Theadora Allan (1889–1968), community worker and organizing secretary for the Travellers' Aid Society of New South Wales
- William Thomas Quick (born 1946), American science fiction author and blogger who sometimes writes under the pen name Margaret Allan

== See also ==
- Margaret Allen (disambiguation)
