= Kim Allen =

Kim Allen may refer to:

- Kim Allen (baseball) (born 1953), American baseball player
- Kim Allen (actress) (born 1982), American actress

== See also ==
- Kim Allan, New Zealand ultramarathoner
