= The Dapifer =

Defunct US fashion magazine

- Editor-in-Chief: Lakenya Kelly
- Categories: Fashion magazine
- Founder: Lakenya Kelly
- Founded: 2010
- First issue: October 2011
- Company: The Dapifer, LLC
- Country: United States
- Based in: New York City
- Language: English

The Dapifer was an independent fashion magazine that focused on editorial photography, fashion industry news, art, and streetwear. It was founded by Lakenya Kelly during his undergraduate studies at Cornell University in 2010. Initially a small streetwear blog, it released its first print issue in October 2011, and maintained a limited print release schedule for future issues. The Dapifer was owned by Kelly, its founder and editor-in-chief.

== Contributors ==
The fashion media platform collaborated with various brands and agencies, including Ford Models, Wilhelmina Models, New York Models, Alexander McQueen, Saint Laurent, and the La Jolla Fashion Film Festival. The Dapifer also collaborated with contemporary visual artists, such as Brooklyn painter Michael Alan. In July 2016, Kelly was appointed as a judge at La Jolla Fashion Film Festival.

== Online platforms ==
In 2016, The Dapifer shifted its focus to digital publishing. The publication introduced iOS and Android apps to facilitate mobile access to its digital content, both of which have since been removed.

In 2016, The Dapifer launched an online networking platform that was also known as The Dapifer. This platform served as a resource in photography, modeling, styling, and the creative arts.
