= Sandy Allen (disambiguation) =

Sandy Allen (1955–2008) was the tallest woman in the world.

Sandy Allen may also refer to:

- Sandy Allen (cricketer) (born 1984)
- Sandy Allen (D.C. Council) (born c. 1943), politician in Washington, D.C.
- Sandy Lewis (softball) (born 1978), maiden name Allen

== See also ==
- Sandra Allen (disambiguation)
- Alexander Allen (disambiguation)
