= Frank Cowell =

English economist

- Occupations: University teacher; writer; editor
- Title: Professor

Academic background
- Education: University of Cambridge (BA, MA, PhD)

Academic work
- Discipline: Economics
- Sub-discipline: Microeconomics
- Institutions: London School of Economics and Political Science; Keele University

Frank Alan Cowell is a professor of economics at the London School of Economics and Political Science. His work includes important contributions to the fields of income and wealth distribution, inequality, poverty and taxation.

== Biography ==
Cowell was educated at Ardingly College before entering Trinity College, Cambridge where he completed his BA (1971), MA (1975) and PhD (1977) in economics. Cowell was briefly Lecturer in Economics at University of Keele before moving to LSE in 1977. He was also Associate Editor of the Journal of Public Economics from 1988 until 2001.

Cowell is the former editor of Economica, a former associate editor of Hacienda Pública Española/Revista de Economia Publica, and the editor-in-chief of the Journal of Economic Inequality. He is also the Director of Distributional Analysis Research Programme at the Suntory-Toyota International Centre for Economics and Related Disciplines.

He has an h-index of 58 according to Google Scholar.

== Selected publications ==
- —————— (1977). Measuring Inequality: Techniques for the Social Sciences (First ed.). Wiley. ISBN 9780470993491. (193 pages). 2nd ed., Prentice Hall/Harvester Wheatsheaf, ISBN 9780134343662, 1995. 3rd ed., Oxford University Press, ISBN 9780199594030, 2011.
- —————— (1 September 1986). Microeconomic Principles. Philip Allan. ISBN 9780860030676. (413 pages).
- —————— (1 June 1990). Cheating the Government: The Economics of Evasion. MIT Press. ISBN 9780262031530. (267 pages).
- Champernowne, D. G.; —————— (1999). Economic Inequality and Income Distribution. Cambridge University Press.
- Amiel, Yoram; —————— (1999). Thinking about Inequality: Personal Judgment and Income Distributions. Cambridge University Press. (163 pages).
- —————— (1 June 2006). Microeconomics: Principles and Analysis (First ed.). Oxford University Press. ISBN 9780199267774. (672 pages). 2nd ed., 2018.
