= Margaret Allen =

Margaret Allen may refer to:

- Margaret Allen (surgeon), American cardiothoracic surgeon (1948–)
- Margaret Allen (historian), Australian historian (1947–)
- Margaret Allen (artist), Irish painter (1832–1914)

== See also ==
- Margaret Allan (disambiguation)
