= Cecilia Garcia-Penalosa =

Spanish economist

Cecilia García-Peñalosa is a Spanish economist and professor of economics at the Aix-Marseille University. She is also associated to the Institute for Fiscal Studies, has an affiliation with the Bank of France., and is visiting professor at the Department of Social Policy of the London School of Economics. She was an associate editor of the European Economic Review and is currently an associate editor at the Journal of Economic Inequality. and the Journal of Economic Growth.

She holds the chair on "Gender, growth and development" at the School for Advanced Studies in the Social Sciences (EHESS) in France. From 2012 to 2016, she was a member of the Council of Economics Advisors who advises the Prime Minister of France., and in 2025 she became the president of the Society for the Study of Economic Inequality.

In 2009, she won the Aldi Hagenaars Memorial Award and was awarded the silver medal by the French National Centre for Scientific Research in 2025.

== Education and career ==
She obtained her D.Phil from Nuffield College, Oxford after a master's degree at Corpus Christi College, Oxford. She holds a bachelor in Economics from the University of Cambridge, where she was at New Hall College. She has held visiting positions at the Free University of Amsterdam, European University Institute in Florence, University of Washington, University of Geneva and LMU Munich.

== Research ==
Her research focuses on economic growth, income inequality and gender inequality. She has published papers in the Journal of Economic Literature, the Journal of Development Economics, the Journal of Public Economics, the Journal of Economic Growth, and the Economic Journal.

Her research has been quoted in Le Figaro, The Economist, Le Monde, France Soir, Les Echos, TV5 Monde, France Culture, Le Monde Diplomatique, Le Point, La Tribune, and the Huffington Post.

She is an expert on the relationship between income inequality and economic growth, and in 1999 published a paper in the Journal of Economic Literature summarizing the main literature on the topic.

=== Selected bibliography ===
- Aghion, Philippe; Caroli, Eve; Garcia-Penalosa, Cecilia (1999). "Inequality and Economic Growth: The Perspective of the New Growth Theories". Journal of Economic Literature. 37 (4): 1615–1660.
- Eicher, Theo S.; Garcı́a-Peñalosa, Cecilia (2001-10-01). "Inequality and growth: the dual role of human capital in development". Journal of Development Economics. 66 (1): 173–197.
- Breen, R., & García Peñalosa, C. (2002). Bayesian learning and gender segregation. Journal of Labor Economics, 20(4), 899-922.
- García-Peñalosa, Cecilia; Turnovsky, Stephen J. (2005-06-01). "Second-best optimal taxation of capital and labor in a developing economy". Journal of Public Economics. 89 (5): 1045–1074.
- Eicher, T., García-Peñalosa, C., & Van Ypersele, T. (2009). Education, corruption, and the distribution of income. Journal of Economic Growth, 14(3), 205-231.
- Checchi, D., & García‐Peñalosa, C. (2010). Labour market institutions and the personal distribution of income in the OECD. Economica, 77(307), 413-450.
- Bosquet, C., Combes, P. P., & García‐Peñalosa, C. (2019). Gender and promotions: Evidence from academic economists in France. The Scandinavian Journal of Economics, 121(3), 1020-1053.
- Brunt, Liam, & Cecilia García-Peñalosa (2022). "Urbanisation and the onset of modern economic growth." The Economic Journal 132.642: 512-545.
