= Richie Allan =

Australian rugby league footballer

Personal information
- Born: 16 April 1975 (age 51) Walhallow, New South Wales, Australia

Playing information
- Position: Fullback, Five-eighth, Halfback
Club
Years	Team	Pld	T	G	FG	P
1994–97	Sydney City Roosters	8	2	1	0	10
1998	Gold Coast Chargers	8	0	2	1	5
	Total	16	2	3	1	15

Richie Allan (born 16 April 1975) is an Australian former professional rugby league footballer who played for the Sydney City Roosters and the Gold Coast Chargers.

Allan, an Indigenous Australian from Walhallow, played as a half-back, five-eighth and fullback. From 1994 to 1997 he played first-grade for the Roosters, then in 1998 spent a year on the Gold Coast, in what was the Chargers' final league season. He played in the local Canberra competition for several seasons after leaving the NRL.
