= Jack Allan =

Jack Allan may refer to:

- Jack Allan (footballer, born 1883) (1883–?), Manchester United footballer
- Jack Allan (footballer, born 1886) (1886–1919), Newcastle United footballer
- Jack Allan (golfer) (1875–1898), Scottish amateur golfer

== See also ==
- Jack Allen (disambiguation)
