= Alexander Allen (politician) =

American politician (1842–1924)

Member of the Washington House of Representatives
- In office 1889–1891

Personal details
- Born: May 1842 Scotland
- Died: January 7, 1924 (aged 81) Seattle, Washington, United States
- Party: Republican

Alexander Allen (May 1842 – January 7, 1924) was an American politician in the state of Washington. He served in the Washington House of Representatives from 1889 to 1891.
