= James Allan (cricketer) =

New Zealand cricketer (born 1972)

Personal information
- Full name: James Matthew Allan
- Born: 3 June 1972 (age 54); Waimate, South Canterbury, New Zealand
- Batting: Right-handed
- Bowling: Right-arm off break

Domestic team information
- Years: Team
- 1993/94–1997/98: Otago

Career statistics
Competition	First-class	List A
Matches	16	1
Runs scored	537	10
Batting average	18.51	10.00
100s/50s	0/1	0/0
Top score	56	10
Balls bowled	18	–
Wickets	1	–
Bowling average	4.00	–
5 wickets in innings	0	–
10 wickets in match	0	–
Best bowling	1/4	–
Catches/stumpings	21/–	0/–
- Source: Cricinfo, 5 May 2016

James Matthew Allan (born 3 June 1972) is a New Zealand former cricketer. He played in 16 first-class matches and one List A match for Otago between the 1993–94 and 1997–98 seasons.

== Biography ==
Allan was born at Waimate in Canterbury in 1972. After playing age-group cricket for Canterbury in the 1990–91 and 1991–92 seasons, he made his first-class debut for Otago against Northern Districts in December 1993. He scored a half-century on debut in the first innings of the match―the only one he scored in senior cricket. He made his List A debut later the same month and played in five more first-class matches during the season, and six the following season before dropping out of the Otago team for a season.

A single match in 1996–97 and three towards the end of the 1997–98 season saw Allan's representative career come to an end. He played club cricket in England for Portsmouth Cricket Club in the Southern Cricket League in 1998.
