= Mary Parsons Reid Allan =

Scottish artist (1917–2002)

- Born: 1917; Glasgow, Scotland
- Died: 2002 (aged 84–85)
- Education: Glasgow School of Art
- Known for: Painting

Mary Parsons Reid Allan (1917–2002) was a Scottish artist known for her oil paintings of still-life subjects.

== Biography ==
Allan was born in Glasgow and studied at the Glasgow School of Art from 1935 to 1939. Early in her career she mainly painted portraits but later increasingly focused on landscape painting, both in Scotland and France, and on still-life pieces. For many years, Allan lived in Helensburgh and until her retirement in 1976 had a long teaching career, originally in Aberdeen but mainly in Glasgow. She regularly exhibited with the Royal Glasgow Institute of the Fine Arts and the Royal Scottish Academy. Allan was a member of the Scottish Society of Women Artists, the Glasgow Society of Lady Artists and also the Glasgow Society of Women Artists and won the Lauder Prize for oil painting twice, once in 1951 and again in 1965. She had solo exhibitions in Edinburgh and at Pitlochry and at the Broughton Gallery. Glasgow Art Gallery holds examples of her paintings.
