= William Allan (footballer, born 1904) =

Scottish footballer

Personal information
- Full name: William Allan
- Date of birth: 1904
- Place of birth: Strathaven, Scotland
- Date of death: 23 November 1969 (aged 64–65)
- Place of death: Strathaven, Scotland
- Height: 5 ft 7 in (1.70 m)
- Position: Right back

Senior career*
| Years | Team | Apps | (Gls) |
| – | Burnbank Athletic | | |
| 1928–1933 | Hamilton Academical | 191 | (0) |
| 1933–1936 | Motherwell | 30 | (0) |
| 1935–1936 | → Dalbeattie Star (loan) | | |
| 1936–1937 | Partick Thistle | 11 | (0) |
| 1937–1938 | Bo'ness | | |
| 1938–1939 | Albion Rovers | 1 | (0) |
- * Club domestic league appearances and goals

William Allan (1904 – 23 November 1969) was a Scottish footballer who played as a right back for Burnbank Athletic, Hamilton Academical, Motherwell, Dalbeattie Star, Partick Thistle, Bo'ness and Albion Rovers.

Known as 'Puggy', he made his debut for Hamilton Academical on 11 August 1928 at home to Third Lanark. Overall, he made 211 appearances for the Accies, featuring on the losing side in the semi-final of the 1931–32 Scottish Cup.

In December 1933 he moved to local rivals Motherwell, one of Scotland's leading teams in the period. Over the course of his time at Fir Park he made 30 appearances in the league without scoring.

While at Burnbank Athletic, he played four games at junior international level as well as playing for Lanarkshire. The closest he came for a senior Scotland cap was when he was selected as a reserve against France in May 1932.
