= Peter John Allan =

Canadian poet (1825–1848)

- Born: 6 June 1825; York, England
- Died: 21 October 1848 (aged 23); Fredericton, Colony of New Brunswick
- Education: King's College, Nova Scotia
- Occupation: poet

Peter John Allan (6 June 1825 – 21 October 1848) was a Canadian poet.

== Life ==
He was born at York, the son of Dr. Colin Allan, at one time chief medical officer of Halifax, Nova Scotia. His short life was mainly spent there and in Fredericton, New Brunswick, where his family moved on his father's retirement in 1836. Growing up in Fredericton, Peter John briefly attended King's College but left before completing his degree.

For a time Allan studied law, but after the success of some published poems began to write full-time. Before his first book of verse was printed, he went down with fever, and died, after a brief illness, at the age of 23.

== Works ==
More than four years after Allan's death was published in London the Poetical Remains of Peter John Allan, Esq. (1853) with a biographical notice, edited by Henry Christmas. The memoir was by the poet's brother, James McGrigor Allan. Allan wrote mainly under Lord Byron's influence.
