= Peter Allan (footballer) =

Australian rules footballer

Personal information
- Full name: Peter Murdoch Allan
- Born: 9 January 1935
- Died: 20 September 1987 (aged 52); Southport, Queensland
- Original team: Wonthaggi
- Height: 182 cm (6 ft 0 in)
- Weight: 81 kg (179 lb)

Playing career^{1}
Years	Club	Games (Goals)
1955	St Kilda	3 (0)
- ^{1} Playing statistics correct to the end of 1955.

Peter Murdoch Allan (9 January 1935 – 20 September 1987) was an Australian rules footballer who played with St Kilda in the Victorian Football League (VFL).
