= Paul Alan =

American singer-songwriter

- Born: February 21, 1971 (age 55); Flint, Michigan
- Genre: Contemporary Christian music

Paul Alan (born August 28, 1971, in Flint, Michigan) is a Contemporary Christian music (CCM) artist and songwriter from Grand Rapids, Michigan. After leading the group Nouveaux in the 1990s, he had several charting solo singles in the 2000s.

== Nouveaux ==
Alan was the lead singer of the Christian pop/rock band Nouveaux. The band began by performing for drug education in Michigan schools. With the band, he wrote the #1 songs "If Only" and "Maybe Tomorrow".

== Solo ==
Alan went solo in 2001. He released the song "To Bring You Back" which charted in the Top 20 on the Country/CCM charts in 2008. He also had hits with the songs "She’s The Reason" (peaking in the top ten) and "Leaving Lonely." Alan's music was featured on Live with Regis and Kelly and the movie "Left Behind."

== Solo Discography ==
- Falling Awake (2001)
- Drive It Home (2008)
