= Sandra Allen (artist) =

American artist (born 1959)

Sandra Allen (born 1959, Quincy, Massachusetts) is an artist primarily known for minimalist graphite on paper drawings.

Allen has been using the tree as her subject since 1998. Allen has been represented by Mario Diacono in Boston, Massachusetts. She has also shown with Barbara Kraków and The Drawing Center, New York City. In September 2013, Allen was the first artist to be shown in Matthew Day Jackson and Laura Seymour's gallery, Bunker259.

In 1978, Sandra Allen graduated from Quincy High School (Massachusetts). After, she graduated from the UMass Dartmouth School of Art in 1984 with a BFA and went on to graduate from the Yale University School of Art in 1989 with an MFA. In 2010, Allen revisited the teaching experience when she became a drawing instructor at the Massachusetts Institute of Technology in Boston, MA.

Allen's work has been on display at the University of Connecticut, the Art Complex Museum, and the Carroll and Sons Gallery. Her 2009 piece was described as "monumental but startlingly intimate" by The Boston Globe. Allen has work in the permanent collections of:

- The Museum of Fine Arts, Boston
- The Fogg Art Museum at Harvard University
- Yale University Art Gallery
