= Andy Allan =

Australian rules footballer (1869–1916)

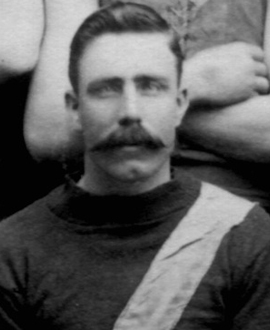

Personal information
- Full name: Andrew Hardie Allan
- Born: 13 June 1869; South Melbourne, Victoria
- Died: 12 May 1916 (aged 46); Melbourne, Victoria
- Original team: Albert Park Juniors

Playing career^{1}
Years	Club	Games (Goals)
1899	St Kilda	4 (0)
- ^{1} Playing statistics correct to the end of 1899.

Andrew Hardie Allan (13 June 1869 – 12 May 1916) was an Australian rules footballer who played for the St Kilda Football Club in the Victorian Football League (VFL).
