= Ron Allan =

Australian rules footballer

Personal information
- Full name: Ronald David Allan
- Born: 3 March 1924; Melbourne, Victoria
- Died: 21 May 1997 (aged 73); Berwick, Victoria
- Original team: West Melbourne
- Height: 180 cm (5 ft 11 in)
- Weight: 86 kg (190 lb)
- Position: Utility

Playing career^{1}
Years	Club	Games (Goals)
1946–1949	North Melbourne (VFL)	14 (4)
1949	Brighton	
1950	North Melbourne seconds	
1951	Preston	
1952–1954	Latrobe	
- ^{1} Playing statistics correct to the end of 1954.

Ronald David Allan (3 March 1924 – 21 May 1997) was an Australian rules footballer who played with North Melbourne in the Victorian Football League (VFL).

== Career ==
Allan, a utility from West Melbourne, played with the North Melbourne seconds during the war, but had to wait until he left to army to make his senior debut. He made 14 league appearances for North Melbourne, from 1946 to 1949.

Midway through the 1949 season, Allan got a clearance to Brighton, in the Victorian Football Association (VFA). In 1950, Allan captained the North Melbourne seconds team, which finished runners-up. He returned to the VFA in 1951, joining Preston, then in 1952 moved to Tasmania to captain-coach North West Football Union club Latrobe. His time in charge of Latrobe included a top four finish in 1953.

== Family ==
His son, Barry, played for North Melbourne in the 1960s.
