= Jimmy Allan (cricketer) =

Scottish cricketer (1932–2005)

Personal information
- Full name: James Moffat Allan
- Born: 2 April 1932; Leeds, Yorkshire, England
- Died: 15 April 2005 (aged 73); Wick, Caithness, Scotland
- Batting: Right-handed
- Bowling: Slow left-arm orthodox
- Relatives: Walter Allan (brother)

Domestic team information
- Years: Team
- 1953–1956: Oxford University
- 1954–1957: Kent
- 1966–1968: Warwickshire

Career statistics
Competition	First-class
Matches	179
Runs scored	4,988
Batting average	22.36
100s/50s	5/26
Top score	153
Balls bowled	28,356
Wickets	435
Bowling average	25.69
5 wickets in innings	18
10 wickets in match	2
Best bowling	7/54
Catches/stumpings	125/–
- Source: CricInfo, 9 October 2013

James Moffat Allan (2 April 1932 – 15 April 2005) was a Scottish cricketer. He was an all-rounder who bowled slow left-arm orthodox and batted right-handed and was described by his Wisden obituary as "the best all-rounder Scotland ever produced".

Allan played 39 first-class matches for Scotland between 1954 and 1972 as well as playing first-class cricket for Oxford University, Kent County Cricket Club and Warwickshire County Cricket Club.

== Early life ==
Allan was born at Leeds in Yorkshire and educated at Edinburgh Academy and Worcester College, Oxford. He was one of four sons of Walter Ramsay Allan, an Edinburgh general practitioner, and Elizabeth Brownlee (née Moffat) who had studied at Oxford University and was described as "a classical scholar". He was in the cricket XI at school and, aged 17, took 85 wickets at a bowling average of less than seven runs per wicket in 1950, captaining the team and with Magnus Magnusson as a bowling partner, and was picked for The Rest against Southern Schools at Lord's, opening the batting. He played for Scottish Wayfarers during the same season.

After going up to Oxford to study classics in 1952, Allan made his first-class debut in 1953, playing for Oxford University against Yorkshire. On debut he returned figures of one wicket for no runs from seven maiden overs, five of which were bowled to Len Hutton, one of England's leading batsmen. The following week he dismissed Keith Miller and Ian Craig in his opening over in a match against the touring Australians, and a run was not scored against him until the 11th over of his first-class career. He won his first Blue in his debut season, going on to win one in each of the four seasons he played for Oxford, although he never finished on the winning team.

== Senior cricket ==
Initially a tail-end batsman at Oxford, he scored his maiden first-class century for the university in 1954, promoted to third in the batting order as a nightwatchman against Hampshire and scoring 118 runs. He followed this with a score of 153 against Sussex two matches later, suddenly promoted to opening the batting. After his Oxford team-mate Colin Cowdrey recommended him to Kent's committee, Allan made his county debut during the 1954 summer vacation, scoring 1,000 runs during the season. The following season he played in a total of 29 first-class matches, 15 for Oxford, 13 for Kent and one for Scotland; he scored 1,335 runs and took 95 wickets, coming within five wickets of achieving the double whilst still an undergraduate. (Note: The Double involves a cricketer scoring 1,000 runs and taking 100 wickets in a season. It is a rare and notable feat.) He was selected to tour Pakistan with an MCC team in 1955–56, but forced to decline due to university exams; his place was taken by Tony Lock.

Allan played a full season for Oxford and Kent in 1956, his last year at university, and in 1957 played seven matches for Kent before moving to work in Scotland, where he played club cricket for Edinburgh Academicals and for Ayr Cricket Club. He played first-class matches for Scotland each season, including against overseas touring teams such as the touring New Zealanders in 1958 and 1965 and Indians in 1959. His Oxford contemporary and friend MJK Smith persuaded him to return to county cricket in 1966, and Allan played three seasons for Warwickshire who Smith captained at the time.

His final season for Warwickshire was in 1968, and Allan returned to play for Scotland, making his final first-class appearance in 1972, taking 3/18 from 24 overs at the age of 40 against Ireland. He took 11/123 in a match against touring Pakistanis in 1971 and, although he never scored a century for Scotland, he made 99 against the touring New Zealanders in 1965. In 2011 he was one of the twelve initial inductees into the Scottish Cricket Hall of Fame.

== Playing style ==
Described as a "very gifted" bowler who used "clever variations of pace", Allan took a total of 435 wickets in his first-class career, with best innings figures of seven wickets for the cost of 54 runs, taken against the Pakistanis in 1971. Although not the hardest spiner of the ball, he used flight and bowled an "immaculate length" to defeat batsmen, and was an accurate and reliable bowler. Allan Massie describes him as "one of the best Scottish cricketers of his generation, and indeed more than that"; his Ayr team-mate Keith Graham described him as "one of the shrewdest left-arm bowlers" he had seen, and he was compared to the likes of association footballers Denis Law and Jim Baxter in terms of his importance to Scottish cricket.

As a batsman he was "gritty", "dogged" and "determined rather than brilliant". He scored 4,988 first-class runs and made five hundreds, including two in one match for Kent against Northants in 1955, his most successful season with the bat.

In total, Allan played in 179 first-class matches, 49 of which were for Oxford, 48 for Warwickshire, 40 for Kent and 39 for Scotland. He also appeared for DR Jardine's XI, The Gentlemen and the Gentlemen of England, whom he was chosen for against the 1956 Australian tourists. In total he played 60 matches for Scotland, (Note: Not all of the Scotland team's matches were first-class during Allan's career.) taking 171 wickets and scoring 1,494 runs for his country. At the time of his death he was Scotland's highest first-class wicket-taker. (Note: The modern Scotland team rarely play first-class cricket.)

== Later life ==
Allan worked as an investment analyst and stockbroker in Edinburgh and was given time off to play cricket by his employers. He continued to play club cricket until the 1980s, when he was in his 50s, and appeared occasionally for teams such as The Forty Club. His older brother, Walter Allan, who later worked as a leading surgeon, played three first-class matches for Scotland in 1950 as well as playing for Edinburgh Academicals.

Allan coached youth cricket at Ayr and was considered a motivational force at the club. In 2004 a bronze bust of him by Evelyn Peffers was unveiled at the Scottish National Gallery of Modern Art in Edinburgh, the first of a cricketer at the gallery. After an illness, he died at Caithness General Hospital in Wick in April 2005 at the age of 73. He was survived by his wife Ann.
