= Tahar Allan =

Algerian politician

Tahar Allan is an Algerian politician who served as Minister for Posts and Telecommunications in the 1992 government of Belaid Abdessalam.

According to his LinkedIn profile, Allan currently works as an independent consultant.
