= Julian Phelps Allan =

English sculptor

- Born: Eva Dorothy Allan; 22 June 1892; Millbrook, Southampton, England
- Died: 31 January 1996 (aged 103); Buckinghamshire, England
- Known for: Sculpture

Julian Phelps Allan, formerly Eva Dorothy Allan, OBE (22 June 1892 – 31 January 1996) was an English sculptor active between 1923 and 1960. In addition to her sculpting, she served in both the First and Second World Wars, eventually becoming a colonel in the Auxiliary Territorial Service and the first President of the ATS War Office Selection Board.

== Early life and education ==
Allan was born Eva Dorothy Allan in Millbrook, Southampton in 1892.

During World War I, she served as a captain with the Queen Mary's Army Auxiliary Corps in France from 1917 to 1919. Based near Dieppe, Allan was in charge of a camp of 200 people.

After the war Allan trained as a domestic science teacher, then switched to studying art at Westminster School of Art and, from December 1922 to December 1927, at the Royal Academy of Arts. She was awarded a Landseer Scholarship in 1923 and won the Royal Academy's Gold Medal in 1925.

In 1926 Allan went to Florence as a pupil of Libero Andreotti. She also studied under Eric Gill.

== As an artist ==
Allan researched and studied throughout her professional life, visiting Yugoslavia in 1933; Croatia (where she met Ivan Meštrović in Zagreb) in 1936; she went to France to study Romanesque art after World War II; and in 1954, Serbia and Yugoslavia to research Byzantine wall-painting .

Many of her works, particularly since 1947, are ecclesiastical in theme. She has been described as a determined and religious person who valued her independence and ability to choose. She also produced architectural sculpture, including bas-reliefs for Lambeth and Maudsley Hospitals.

Allan exhibited at the Royal Academy between 1929 and 1938, returning in 1946 and 1949, and from 1947, showed her work at the Royal Society of Arts. She was an associate member of the Royal British Society of Sculptors from March 1938 until she resigned in 1941, but rejoined in 1945, and was made a Fellow in 1947.

She was also a member of the "Sculptures and Memorials" organisation, which was founded in 1934 to support British sculptors working with local stones.

From about 1950 to 1970 Allan was based in Scotland, living in Balerno, Edinburgh, where she had a studio that was later taken over by the sculptor Michael Snowden.

=== Significant works ===
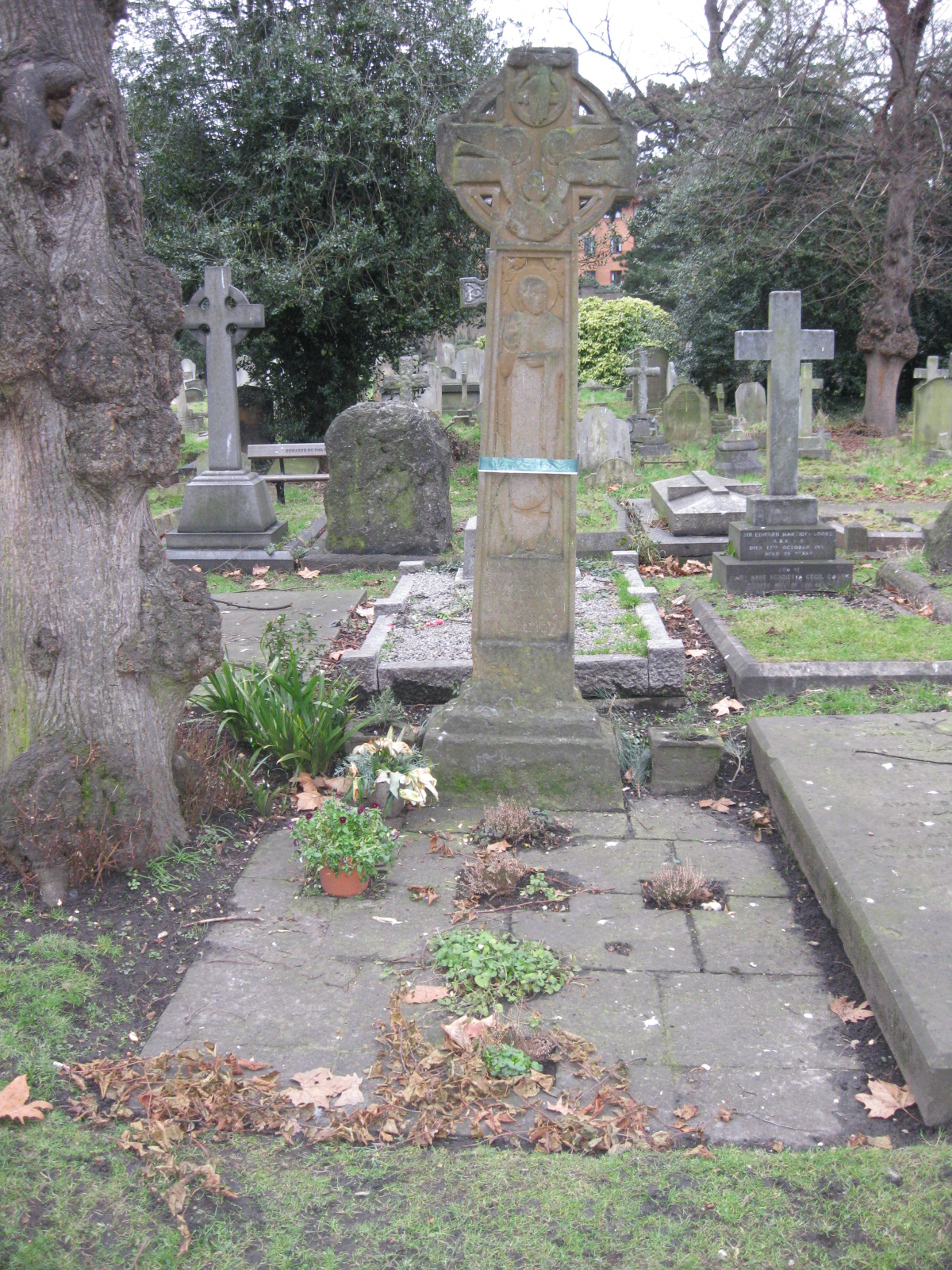
Emmeline Pankhurst's gravestone

Allan's work can be seen all over the United Kingdom. Some of her most significant work includes:

- Bust of Marjorie Dunlop in the Tate Gallery (1928).
- Emmeline Pankhurst's gravestone in Brompton Cemetery (1928–1930).
- The altar relief at Downe House School (1932).
- Winged Victory, St. Dunstans National Centre chapel at Ovingdean (1938).
- Monumental brasses and memorial bronzes.

== Personal life ==
Allan formally assumed the identity Julian Phelps Allan in 1929. Curators at the Tate have suggested that by taking a masculine name, Allan was declaring her lesbian identity. Allan, who found it difficult to get work in studios or workshops due to being a woman, may also have felt that for her work to be "taken more seriously" she needed a masculine name. However, Allan made it clear that even though she had changed her name, she preferred to retain female pronouns and in correspondence she was addressed as "Miss Julian P. Allan".

In World War II, Allan served in the Auxiliary Territorial Service where she became a colonel, and was the first President of the A.T.S. War Office Selection Board. She was subsequently awarded the O.B.E.

Allan was registered blind by 1974, and went deaf in later life.

== Death ==
Julian Phelps Allan died at 103 years old on 31 January 1996 in Buckinghamshire, England.
