= Henry Allan (cricketer) =

Australian cricketer

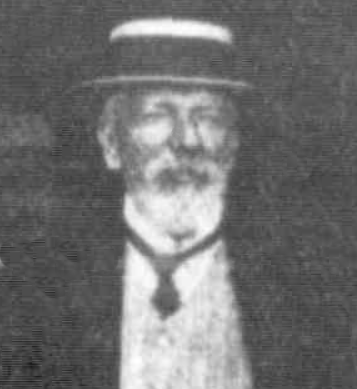

Personal information
- Born: 6 January 1846; Westminster, England
- Died: 26 April 1926 (aged 80); East Melbourne, Victoria, Australia
- Source: ESPNcricinfo, 22 December 2016

Henry Allan (6 January 1846 – 26 April 1926) was an Australian cricketer. He played one first-class match for New South Wales in 1871/72.

== See also ==
- List of New South Wales representative cricketers
