= James Allan (computer scientist) =

American computer scientist

- Occupation: Professor of computer science at University of Massachusetts Amherst

James Allan is the chair of Faculty and professor of computer science at University of Massachusetts Amherst. He was named an ACM Fellow in 2020, for his research and contributions to the area of information retrieval. His research has been cited more than 20,000 times (as of April 2021). In 2019, Allan was elected to be the treasurer of the Computing Research Association for a term of two years.
