= Tom Allan (Methodist) =

Methodist minister in Western Australia

Thomas Allan (c. 1864 – 4 June 1932) was a Methodist minister in Western Australia, best known for his work as organising secretary of the Methodist Children's Home at Victoria Park and Werribee Boys' Farm.

== History ==
Allan was born in Mount Barker, South Australia, second son of Scots-born Arthur Allan (c. 1829 – 28 March 1909) and Christina Allan, née Morton (died 19 October 1885) of "Wattle Vale Farm", Greens Plains (later Paskeville), South Australia.

He trained for the Methodist ministry under A. W. Wellington.

In 1888 he was stationed at Morgan, and registered as an officiating minister. In 1889 he qualified as a probationary Primitive Methodist minister and in 1890 he was sent to Dawson, on the Broken Hill track, serving as home missionary on the South and West Barrier Primitive Methodist circuit. He found the work congenial, and was next sent to Kadina.

Allan came to the goldfields of Western Australia in 1896, settling in Norseman, where he conducted a chapel for all the "dissenting denominations", earning a reputation for strength of character, energy, and public speaking ability. He established churches at Brown Hill, Mount Malcolm, and Gwalia. He left Norseman for Kalgoorlie in April 1897.

In 1901 he was given a change of environment to North Fremantle, then three years later recalled to the goldfields at Boulder. He was sent back to the city as minister to the prosperous churches at Fremantle, Charles Street, Perth, and Guildford. He moved into executive positions: Chairman of Kalgoorlie district, secretary to the General Home Mission, and in 1910 president of West Australian Methodist Conference.

With the advent of the Great War, Allan's two elder sons volunteered for the First AIF: Morton McLeod Allan in February 1915 and Arthur Melville Allan in December 1915. As the war ground on with casualties rising and enlistments declining, Prime Minister Billy Hughes fought to have enlistment for overseas service made compulsory for eligible males. A referendum, required by the Constitution before it could become law, was held on 28 October 1916; the Methodist Church was prominent among its advocates and Allan one of its most vocal supporters, as was his wife, Edith, who wrote stirring letters to the newspapers, supporting the conscription cause. When the first referendum failed, a second one was called for 20 December 1917. Allan fought for the church's continuing support speaking for the motion at every opportunity. His eldest son was killed during this period. Years later it emerged that a rumor was rife, accusing Allan of being paid to support the "yes" campaign, and he was pleased to debunk the myth.

By 1912 preparations were underway, with Allan as secretary and A. J. Barclay and Alex Crawford as treasurers, for a Methodist Children's Home and orchard at Werribee near Wundowie, on a government-donated 1,000 acres (400 ha) property adjacent the railway line. The Great War intervened however, and nothing much was heard of the project until 1920, when a new committee was formed with Allan as organising secretary. New forms of funding were developed to avoid the usual stop-go flow of donations. The Werribee orchard project was "put on hold" and a building purchased at Victoria Park, which was re-purposed as an orphanage and opened on 14 October 1922. Werribee Boys' Farm was officially opened on 2 November 1929, with several boys from the Victoria Park institution already installed there, intent on becoming prosperous farmers. Allan, the "restless beggar", was given credit for raising much of the farm's organisation.

== Recognition ==
Allan was awarded the MBE in October 1920. "He always had a soft corner in his heart for the soldiers and did splendid work on their behalf as a result of which he was awarded the M.B.E. decoration." said one commentator, but it could equally have been in recognition of his support for conscription.

He died at his residence at Kalamunda at the age of 68.

A memorial service was held in the Wesley Church in Perth on Monday 6 June, when Rev. A. W. Bray gave an address. The funeral was held later in the afternoon.

== Family ==
Thomas Allan married Mary Elizabeth "Bessie" Ball (died 1886 or 1887) on 13 May 1885. He married again, to Emma Melville on 4 April 1893. Their children included:

- Morton McLeod Allan (28 February 1894 – 20 September 1917) born in Kadina, was killed in action in France.
- Arthur Melville Allan (25 October 1895 – 20 August 1969) ditto
- Gordon Thomas Allan (c. 1900 – 12 January 1933) married Ruth Miller on 21 April 1928.
- Stanley Norman Allan (1902 – 6 May 1966) married Eileen Rose Louise O'Grady (1895–1980) in 1931. O'Grady was a granddaughter of WA pioneer Frederick Waldeck.

His elder brother, Alexander Allan (died 12 November 1935), married Annie Woodman on 15 June 1889.
