= Jack Allen (Australian footballer) =

Australian rules footballer (1887–1956)

Personal information
- Full name: John Thomas Allen
- Born: 13 October 1887; Mount Duneed, Victoria
- Died: 22 November 1956 (aged 69); Geelong, Victoria

Playing career^{1}
Years	Club	Games (Goals)
1907	Geelong	8 (0)
- ^{1} Playing statistics correct to the end of 1907.

John Thomas Allen (13 October 1887 – 22 November 1956) was an Australian rules footballer who played with Geelong in the Victorian Football League (VFL).
