= Harry Allan (footballer) =

Scottish footballer (fl. 1890s)

Harry Allan was a Scottish footballer who played right back for Mossend Celtic, Hamilton Academical and Albion Rovers.

Allan moved from Mossend to Hamilton in November 1898 and made his debut on 12 November away to Linthouse in a game which was lost 3–2. He made 24 appearances for the club including 16 in the league and left for Albion Rovers in 1900.
