= Mitchell Allan =

Australian snowboarder

Mitchell Allan is an Australian half-pipe snowboarder. He competed in the 2006 Winter Olympics and placed 19th and 25th in his qualification runs. He ranked 31st out of 44 competitors and did not make the final. He was the youngest Australian on the 2006 Olympic team.
