= Cecilia G. de Guilarte =

Spanish writer (1915–1989)

- Born: 20 December 1915; Tolosa, Gipuzkoa, Spain
- Died: 14 July 1989 (aged 73); Tolosa, Gipuzkoa, Spain
- Occupations: Essayist; Playwright; Novelist; Journalist

Cecilia García de Guilarte (20 December 1915 – 14 July 1989) was a Spanish essayist, playwright, novelist and journalist.

== Bibliography ==
- Tabernilla, Guillermo; Lezamiz, Julen (2007). Cecilia G. de Guilarte, reporter de la CNT: sus crónicas de guerra. Bilbao: Beta III milenio. ISBN 978-84-89212-69-5.
