= James McGrigor Allan =

English anthropologist and writer

James McGrigor Allan (1827, Bristol - 1916, Epsom) was an English anthropologist and writer.

== Biography ==
McGrigor was the son of Colin Allan, at one time chief medical officer of Halifax, Nova Scotia, and Jane Gibbon. He opposed women's right to vote and argued that universal suffrage would cause the disruption of domestic ties, the desecration of marriage and the dissolution of the family. He also argue that woman's natural structure don't allow them to do so. He attributed the agitation for equal rights to the problem of the "superfluous women" on account of emigration and the growing objection of middle and upper-class men to marriage.

He was a member of the Anthropological Society of London. His younger brother was the poet Peter John Allan.

== Works ==
Fiction

- (1857). Ernest Basil.
- (1858). Grins and Wrinkles.
- (1862). The Cost of a Coronet.
- (1862). The Last Days of a Bachelor: An Autobiography.
- (1863). Nobly False: A Novel.
- (1864). Father Stirling.
- (1887). The Wild Curate.
- (1888). A Lady's Four Perils: A Novel.
- (1903). Where Lies her Charm?

Non-fiction

- (1860). The Intellectual Severance of Men and Women.
- (1890). Woman Suffrage, Wrong in Principle, and Practice: An Essay.

Selected articles

- (1866). "On the Ape-Origin of Mankind," The Popular Magazine of Anthropology 1 (4), pp. 121–128.
- (1868). "Europeans and their Descendants in North America," Journal of the Anthropological Society of London 6, pp. cxxvi-clxvii.
- (1869). "On the Real Differences in the Minds of Men and Women," Journal of the Anthropological Society of London 7, pp. cxcv-ccxix.
- (1870). "A Protest Against Woman's Demand for the Privileges of both Sexes," Victoria Magazine 15, pp. 318–356.

Miscellany

- (1853). "Biographical Notice of the Author," in The Poetical Remains of Peter John Allan. London: Smith, Elder & Co.
