= Joanne Allan =

New Zealand rugby union player

- Height: 1.8 m (5 ft 11 in)
- Weight: 65 kg (143 lb)

Rugby union career
- Position: Lock
International career
Years	Team	Apps	(Points)
1989	New Zealand	1	(0)

Joanne Allan (née Nesbitt) is a former New Zealand rugby union player.

== Rugby career ==
Allan made her only appearance for New Zealand against the California Grizzlies at Christchurch in 1989.

Allan also competed in basketball and sailing. She was the South Island sailing champion in the 470 class with future Olympic silver medalist, Leslie Egnot.
