= Alexander Allen (writer) =

English writer and linguist (1814–1842)

Alexander Allen (23 September 1814 – 6 November 1842) was an English writer and linguist who specialised in studies of Greece.

== Biography ==
He was the son of John Allen, born at Hackney 23 September 1814. He was educated at his father's school (the Madras House Grammar School, at Hackney) and the University of London. On his father's death he carried on the grammar school.

Allen obtained, in 1840, the degree of Doctor of Philosophy from the University of Leipzig. In the dedication of his Analysis of Latin Verbs to Thomas Hewitt Key, he mentions that many of his philological principles were derived from Key; he also acknowledges, in his ‘Essay on Teaching Greek,’ his obligations to his friend William Wittich, teacher of German in University College, London.

In the last years of his life he paid attention to Anglo-Saxon, Swedish, Danish, Icelandic, and German languages, with a view to a comprehensive work on the history and structure of the English language. He left many notes upon this subject, but not in a state fit for publication.

Allen died on 6 November 1842.

== Works ==
His chief works, of which, considering the early age at which he died, the number is extraordinary, are an ‘Etymological Analysis of Latin Verbs,’ London, 1836, 8vo; ‘Constructive Greek Exercises, for teaching Greek from the beginning by Writing,’ 1839; ‘Eclogæ Ciceronianæ,’ 1839; ‘A New Greek Delectus, translated from the German of Dr. Kühner,’ 1839; ‘A New Latin Delectus,’ 1840; ‘A New English Grammar,’ 1841; an Essay on teaching Greek, published in vol. I of the ‘Papers of the Central Society of Education;’ an Essay on writing Latin and Greek Exercises, in No. 18 of ‘Journal of Education,’ and one on Parsing, in No. 20. These essays show Dr. Allen's skill as a teacher. He also contributed articles to the ‘Penny Cyclopædia’ and Smith's ‘Dictionary of Greek and Roman Antiquities’ and ‘Dictionary of Greek and Roman Biography and Mythology.’
