= Abby Allan =

New Zealand footballer

Personal information
- Full name: Abby Allan

International career
Years	Team	Apps	(Gls)
1994–1995	New Zealand	6	(0)

Abby Allan is a former association football player who represented New Zealand at international level.

Allan made her Football Ferns début in a 0–1 loss to Bulgaria on 24 August 1994, and finished her international career with six caps to her credit. She went on to play in the United States on a full scholarship to Fairfield University where she still holds the all-time scoring record, was voted to All-America team and inducted into the Fairfield University Hall of Fame. #15
