= Alexander Allen (stylist) =

Fashion stylist

- Occupation: Fashion stylist

Alexander Allen is a New York-based fashion stylist.

== Background ==
Alexander Allen grew up in Brooklyn, NY. He worked in the public relations department at DKNY before starting his own company, Transformers, in 2001.

Allen was called one of Tinseltown's most influential stylists in the USA Today article, "Behind the Scenes: Hollywood's Fashion Secrets. Meet The Power Stylists."

Style critic Robert Verdi praised Alexander's work, confirming that Alexander "invented Eve." He has dressed celebrities including Beyoncé, Pink, Toni Braxton, Eve, Laura Linney and Japanese artist Takashi Murakami. Alexander was featured in Ebony magazine's March 2008 issue as "Fashion Heavyweight Champion."
