= George Allen (publisher) =

English craftsman and engraver

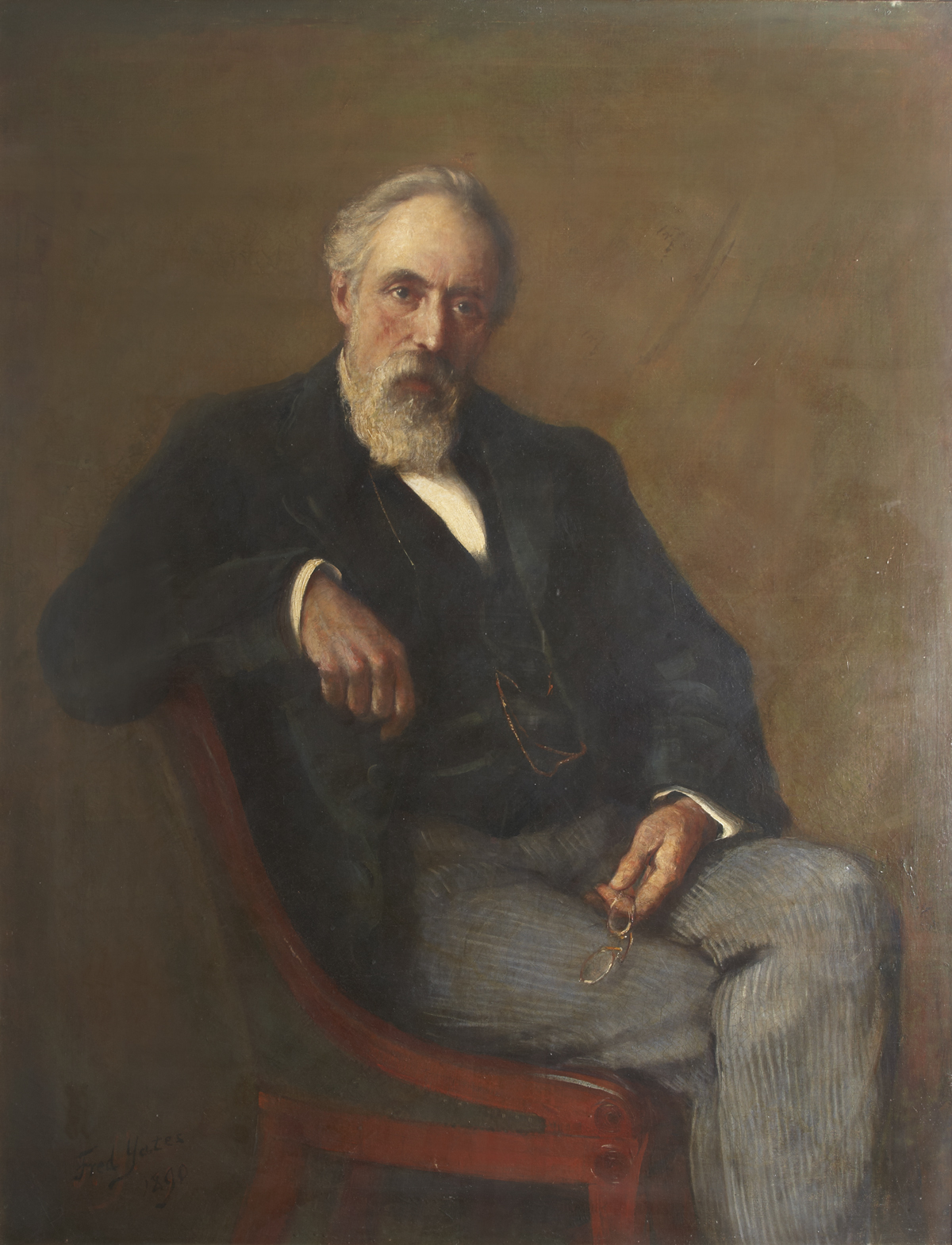
- Born: 26 March 1832; Newark-on-Trent, England
- Died: 5 September 1907 (aged 76); Orpington, England
- Occupations: Craftsman; engraver; publisher; entrepreneur
- Known for: Publishing company George Allen & Sons / George Allen & Unwin

George Allen (26 March 1832 – 5 September 1907) was an English craftsman and engraver, who became an assistant to John Ruskin and then in consequence a publisher. His name persists in publishing through the George Allen & Unwin company.

== Early life ==
The son of John and Rebecca Allen, he was born on 26 March 1832 at Newark-on-Trent, and was educated at a private grammar school there. His father died in 1849, and in that year he was apprenticed for four years to an uncle (his mother's brother), a builder in Clerkenwell, London. He became a skilled joiner, and was employed for three and a half years in that capacity on the woodwork of the interior of Dorchester House, Park Lane. Allen and another workman worked for 79 days on a single door in the house, and Ruskin later showed a model of this door to his friends as a specimen of English craftsmanship.

== With John Ruskin ==
On the foundation of the Working Men's College in 1854, Allen joined the drawing class, and became one of Ruskin's pupils there. He was offered a post in Queen Victoria's household, working on the furniture of the royal palaces; but he declined it in order to concentrate on work for Ruskin's service. He took on posts of different kinds for 50 years.

For a few years Allen acted as an assistant drawing-master under Ruskin at the college. Ruskin then encouraged him to specialise in engraving, which he studied under John Henry Le Keux the line engraver; he also studied mezzotint under Thomas Goff Lupton. Allen's duties for Ruskin were various.

== Publisher ==
In 1871 Ruskin decided to set up a publishing house of his own. At a week's notice, and without any previous experience of the trade, Allen started in on this enterprise. His publishing establishment was first his cottage at Keston, and later an out-house in the garden of his villa at Orpington. In the early days Ruskin's ideas on distribution hampered the business, and in time expansion of the business made for the premises in London. In 1890 Allen opened a London publishing house (trading under the name George Allen & Sons) at 8 Bell Yard, Chancery Lane; and in 1894 he moved to a larger place at 156 Charing Cross Road. There he took to general publishing, though Ruskin's works remained the major part of his business. His last project was the library edition of Ruskin's works, appearing from 1903 to its completion after his death in 1911.

=== Book series ===
Book series published by George Allen included:

- Athenian Drama for English Readers
- Antiquary's Books
- The Casket Series
- County Churches: Handy Guides to the Old Parish Churches of England
- Labour Ideal Series
- The Library Series
- Memorials of the Counties of England
- Modern Painters
- The "Pensées" Series
- The Pocket Ruskin
- The Works of John Ruskin (series jointly published in the United States by Longmans, Green & Co.)
- The Young England Library

== Death ==
Allen was one of the original Companions of Ruskin's Guild of St. George. He died, in his seventy-sixth year, on 5 September 1907, at Orpington, and is buried in the parish churchyard there. His wife had died, in her eightieth year, eight months before him. His collection of minerals was acquired after his death by the University of Oxford.

== Works ==
Allen made engravings in mixed styles, and these were included in Ruskin's later books. Of the original illustrations in Modern Painters, three were from drawings by Allen; he engraved three plates for the edition of 1888; and in all executed 90 other plates for Ruskin. As with some of the other assistants, his work has sometimes been mistaken for Ruskin's.

== Family ==
Allen was brought further into connection with Ruskin by marrying (25 December 1856) the latter's mother's maid, Anne Eliza Hobbes. They had four sons and four daughters. The eldest daughter, Grace Allen, and the two eldest sons, William and Hugh, carried on the family business after their father's death. In 1911 George Allen & Sons amalgamated with Swan Sonnenschein & Co. Ltd. (see William Swan Sonnenschein) and became George Allen & Co. Ltd. In 1913 the firm became insolvent and it was taken over by Stanley Unwin, emerging as George Allen and Unwin.
