= Robert Allan (footballer) =

English footballer

Personal information
- Height: 6 ft 1 in (1.85 m)
- Position: Goalkeeper

Youth career
- Cronberry Eglinton

Senior career*
Years	Team	Apps	(Gls)
1907–1908	Sunderland	11	(0)
1908–19??	Heart of Midlothian		
- * Club domestic league appearances and goals

Robert Allan was an English professional footballer who played as a goalkeeper for Sunderland.
