= Barry Allan =

Australian rules footballer

Personal information
- Born: 26 September 1942 (age 84)
- Original team: Beaconsfield (SWGFL)
- Height: 188 cm (6 ft 2 in)
- Weight: 85 kg (187 lb)

Playing career^{1}
Years	Club	Games (Goals)
1962–1967	North Melbourne	61 (18)
- ^{1} Playing statistics correct to the end of 1967.

Barry Allan (born 26 September 1942) is a former Australian rules footballer who played with North Melbourne in the Victorian Football League (VFL).

Allan, who was recruited from Beaconsfield in the South West Gippsland Football League, is the son of 1940s North Melbourne player Ron Allan. He made his senior VFL debut in round four 1962. During his first couple of seasons he played mostly reserves football before becoming a regular senior player.

A ruckman, Allan played 61 league games for North Melbourne, from 1962 to 1967.

He had been appointed captain-coach of Pakenham in 1966, but North Melbourne refused to clear him.
