= Rob Allan =

New Zealand poet (1945–2021)

Rob Allan (1945 – October 2021) was a New Zealand poet. He won the PEN (NZSA) Best First Book of Poetry award in 1992 for his book Karitane Postcards, and has received multiple grants from Creative New Zealand to support his writing. He has been published in several anthologies including An Anthology of New Zealand Poetry in English (Oxford University Press, 1997), and has published widely in literary magazines.

== Personal life and death ==
Born in Birmingham, England, Allan moved to New Zealand with his family as a teenager in 1960. He lived in Port Chalmers, New Zealand, and worked as a teacher for deaf children in Otago schools.

Allan died in October 2021.

== Works ==
- Karitane Postcards (Hazard Press, 1991). ISBN 0-908790-13-9.
