= Alex Allen (baseball) =

- Left fielder
- Batted: Unknown Threw: Unknown

Negro league baseball debut
- 1943, for the New York Black Yankees

Last appearance
- 1943, for the New York Black Yankees
- Stats at Baseball Reference

Teams
- New York Black Yankees (1943)

Alex "Popeye" Allen was an American professional baseball left fielder in the Negro leagues. He played with the New York Black Yankees in 1943.
