= Jack Allen (footballer, born 1889) =

English footballer

Personal information
- Full name: John Allen
- Date of birth: 2 December 1888
- Place of birth: Attercliffe, England
- Date of death: 1948 (aged 59–60)
- Position: Right back

Senior career*
| Years | Team | Apps | (Gls) |
| 1906 | Colne | | |
| 1906–1907 | Attercliffe Friends | | |
| 1907–1909 | Chesterfield | 11 | (1) |
| 1909–1910 | Doncaster Rovers | | |
| 1910 | Tibshelf Colliery | | |
| 1910–1911 | Croydon Common | 2 | (0) |
| 1911–1912 | East Vale | | |
- South Normanton Colliery
- * Club domestic league appearances and goals

Jack Allen (2 December 1889 – 1948), sometimes known as Walter Allen, was an English footballer who played as a right back in the Football League for Chesterfield.

== Career statistics ==
Appearances and goals by club, season and competition
| Club | Season | League | | | FA Cup | | Total | |
| Club | Season | Division | Apps | Goals | Apps | Goals | Apps | Goals |
|---|---|---|---|---|---|---|---|---|
| Chesterfield | 1907–08 | Second Division | 11 | 1 | 0 | 0 | 11 | 1 |
| Croydon Common | 1910–11 | Southern League Second Division | 2 | 0 | 0 | 0 | 2 | 0 |
| Career total | | | 13 | 1 | 0 | 0 | 13 | 1 |
