= John Allan (antiquarian) =

American antiquarian (1777–1863)

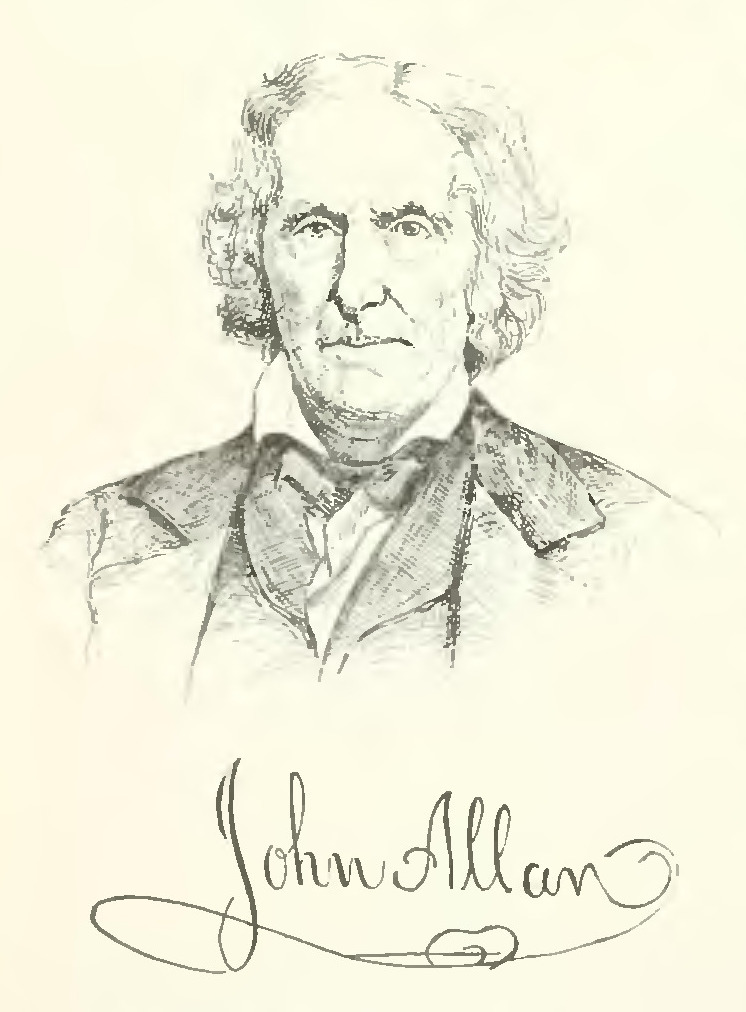
- Born: February 26, 1777; Kilbirnie
- Died: November 19, 1863 (aged 86); New York City
- Occupation: Antiquarian

John Allan (February 26, 1777 – November 19, 1863) was a Scottish-born American antiquarian.

Allan was born in Kilbirnie, Ayrshire, Scotland. His father was a tenant farmer, and sent his son to a grammar school. After leaving school he worked on the farm, but, finding this labor uncongenial, he emigrated to New York in 1794, secured employment as a clerk or book-keeper, and speedily acquired a high reputation for industry and trustworthiness. He was book-keeper to Rich & Distrow, merchant tailors, for many years, and to his clerkship he added also the business of commission agent, and was at one time much employed as a house agent and collector of rents. By these various employments he secured a moderate independence.

He married early in life, and occupied for a quarter of a century a house in Pearl Street. opposite Centre Street, the site of which is now part of the public street. In 1837 he removed to 17 Vandewater Street, where he resided until his death, and there found leisure for gratifying his taste for antiquarian research. In a room at his house his valuable and unique collection of pictures, books, autographs, and rare and curious articles, especially attractive to the antiquary and virtuoso, was frequently viewed by visitors to the city and by others. In this room, so garnished, he died.

Allan's collection was sold at auction a short time after his death, and the total receipts amounted to $87,689.26. The auctioneer was Joseph Sabin. At that time but one of his children, a Mrs. Stewart, was living, and he had appointed her sole executrix of his estate. One of Allan's hobbies was a fancy for snuff-boxes, of which he had gathered a large and valuable collection. Another was illustrating such works as the Life of George Washington by Washington Irving and Robert Burns's Poems, which brought extremely high prices at his celebrated sale. See Duyckinck's "Memorial of John Allan," issued by the Bradford Club (New York, 1864).
