= The Journal of Economic Inequality =

- Discipline: Economics
- Language: English
- Edited by: Frank Cowell

Publication details
- History: 2003–present
- Publisher: Springer Science+Business Media (Netherlands)
- Frequency: Quarterly
- Impact factor: 0.980 (2017)

Standard abbreviations
- ISO 4: J. Econ. Inequal.

Indexing
- ISSN: 1569-1721 (print); 1573-8701 (web)
- LCCN: 2005222603
- OCLC no.: 971916685

Links
- Journal homepage; Online archive

The Journal of Economic Inequality is a quarterly peer-reviewed academic journal covering the study of economic and social inequality. It was established in 2003 and is published by Springer Science+Business Media. The editor-in-chief is Frank Cowell (London School of Economics and Political Science). According to the Journal Citation Reports, the journal has a 2017 impact factor of 0.980.
