= George Allan (cricketer) =

Australian cricketer

Personal information
- Born: 18 February 1887; Albury, New South Wales, Australia
- Died: 2 November 1932 (aged 45); Adelaide, Australia

Domestic team information
- Years: Team
- 1922-1928: Tasmania
- Source: Cricinfo, 24 January 2016

George Allan (18 February 1887 – 2 November 1932) was an Australian cricketer. He played seven first-class matches for Tasmania between 1922 and 1928.

== See also ==
- List of Tasmanian representative cricketers
