= Walhallow, New South Wales =

Walhallow New South Wales
- Coordinates: 31°23′00″S 150°25′04″E
- Population: 179 (with Caroona; 2006)
- Postcode(s): 2343
- Location: 370 km (230 mi) NW of Sydney; 91 km (57 mi) SW of Tamworth; 34 km (21 mi) NW of Quirindi
- LGA(s): Gunnedah Shire
- State electorate(s): Tamworth
- Federal division(s): Parkes

Walhallow is a village in the North West Slopes region of New South Wales, Australia, near the Mooki River. The town is in the south east corner of Gunnedah Shire local government area, 370 kilometres (230 mi) north west of the state capital, Sydney and 34 kilometres (21 mi) west of the nearest sizeable town, Quirindi. At the 2006 census, the village with neighbouring Caroona had a population of 179.

Walhallow is the site of a former Aboriginal reserve and was previously known as "Caroona" mission. It was first gazetted in 1895 following an application made a year previously to the Aboriginal Protection Board. The initial area gazetted was 150 acres (61 ha) and this was expanded to 230 acres (93 ha) in 1899. The reserve was revoked in 1962 but the residents were permitted to remain under permissive occupancy until 1973 when the land was transferred to the Aboriginal Lands Trust under the Aboriginal Act (NSW) 1973.

The village consists of 42 houses of brick and tile construction. Since 1979, construction of these houses replaced timber and fibro houses built in the 1940s. Management of these houses is divided between two corporations; 23 houses by the Walhallow Local Aboriginal Land Council and the remainder by the Walhallow Aboriginal Corporation. The village also has a community hall, church and a primary health post (clinic). The former health post building is now used as the Community Development Employment Project (CDEP) offices. Walhallow Public School is one of only five schools in New South Wales with an all-Aboriginal enrolment.

After acquiring grant funds from the now abolished Aboriginal and Torres Strait Islander Commission, the village was fully equipped with housing, maintained roads and upgraded water and sewerage supplies by 1998. In 1997 Wallhallow was selected to be a finalist in the "small towns" category of the Tidy Towns awards.

Today Walhallow is quite a model reserve, as anyone who has visited other reserves will know. Its people are on the whole a proud people, a happy and generous people mostly able to integrate with the white people in surrounding areas, although they do not always choose to do so

— Levett in Levett & Baker 1990, p.6,

There is another Walhallow at 17°47'0.27"S 135°39'43.53"E
