= John Allan (minister) =

Presbyterian minister, professor of theology (1897–1979)

John Aitken Allan (18 August 1897 – 31 August 1979) was born in Wellington, Wellington, New Zealand on 18 August 1897 and was a New Zealand presbyterian minister and professor of theology.
