= John Allan (footballer, fl. 1932–33) =

Scottish footballer

John Allan was a Scottish footballer who played as an inside forward, initially for Blantyre Celtic and then in the Scottish Football League for Hamilton Academical.

He made his debut for Hamilton on 17 December 1932 in a 4–4 draw against Rangers at Ibrox in a game in which he scored. He was said to have good ability in making long kicks upfield. He scored two goals in 15 league appearances for Accies across two seasons.

He played cricket locally for Uddingston.
