= Kim Allan =

New Zealand long-distance runner

Kim Allan is a New Zealand-based ultramarathoner. At the age of 47 on 22 November 2012 she attempted to complete a 500 km Ultramarathon with no sleep around the Sri Chinmoy Peace Mile at Auckland Domain, raising money for the New Zealand Spinal Trust and the Catwalk Spinal Cord Injury Trust. According to her Facebook page, she only managed 385.8 km.

However, Allan followed up at the International Association of Ultrarunners (IAU) 24 Hour World Championship in Steenbergen, Netherlands on 11 & 12 May 2013 by accomplishing 203.919 km in the 24 hour period, for 39th placed woman and 1st New Zealand woman.

In December 2013 Allan ran for 86 hours, 11 minutes and 9 seconds without sleeping, according to event co-manager Mark Stone. In that run she broke the previous women's world record of running without sleep (which was 486 kilometres) reaching 500 kilometres. She was running to support the New Zealand Spinal Trust.
