= George Allan (antiquary) =

English antiquary and attorney

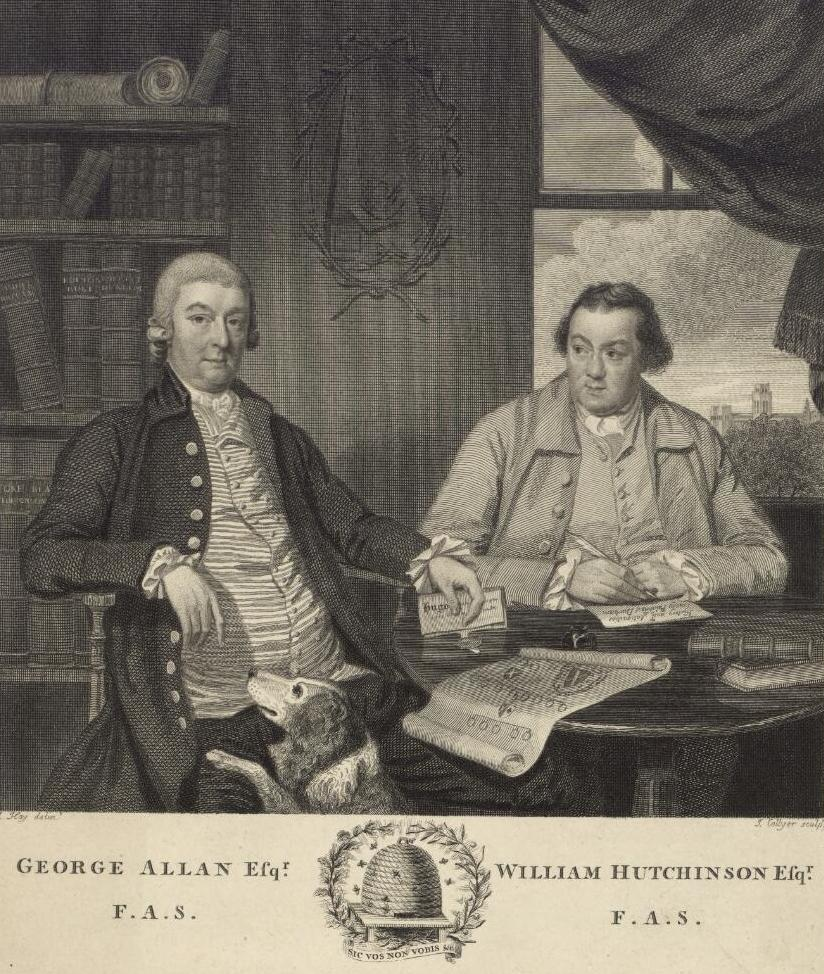
George Allan (left) and William Hutchinson, 1814 engraving by Joseph Collyer the Younger.

George Allan (1736–1800) was an English antiquary and attorney at Darlington.

== Life ==
Allan spent much of his youth in Wakefield, West Yorkshire, where he was educated at Queen Elizabeth Grammar School, Wakefield. He became an assiduous collector of manuscripts.

== Works ==
He was the author of several works relating to the history and antiquities of County Durham; he greatly aided William Hutchinson in his History and Antiquities of the County Palatine of Durham. He presented to the Society of Antiquaries of London 26 quarto volumes of a manuscript relating principally to the University of Oxford, which he extracted from the public libraries there. He possessed a printing press, with which he produced several works; among them was a reprint of Robert Hegg's 1626 work, Legend of St Cuthbert.

== Family ==
Allan married Anne Nicholson, and they had six children. The eldest son George Allan served as Member of Parliament for Durham.
