= George H. Allan =

American politician

Member of the Maine House of Representatives from the Portland district
- In office 1901–1904
- In office 1917–1920
- In office 1937 – August 13, 1938

Personal details
- Born: January 19, 1861 Pembroke, Maine, U.S.
- Died: August 13, 1938 (aged 77) Portland, Maine, U.S.
- Party: Republican
- Occupation: Attorney and state legislator

George H. Allan (January 19, 1861 – August 13, 1938) was an American attorney and politician from Maine. Allan, a Republican from Portland, served five terms in the Maine House of Representatives between 1901 and 1938. He was elected in 1900, 1902, 1916, 1918, and 1936. He died prior to the completion of his fifth term and is buried at Portland's Evergreen Cemetery.

== Women's suffrage ==
Allan was a prominent supporter of women's suffrage and either introduced or drafted bills to the Maine Legislature in support of women's suffrage on three occasions. In 1903, during his second term in office, he introduced a bill to give women taxpayers suffrage in state elections, which was defeated. In 1913, while out of office, Allan drafted a resolve in favor of full suffrage, which was introduced by Sen. Ira G. Hersey. This measure passed both the House and Senate but failed to garner the necessary two-thirds support to be sent to the voters for ratification. In 1919, Allan, then in his fourth term, prepared a law granting full suffrage in presidential election passed both the House and Senate later that month. Anti-suffragists organized a people's veto petition drive which forced a statewide vote on the measure. However, in August 1920, the Nineteenth Amendment to the United States Constitution was passed granting women the right to vote nationwide which was ratified by Maine in November 1919. However, the petition drive had previously been deemed constitutional by the Maine Supreme Judicial Court and a vote was held on Maine's amendment in 1920, which, with women now enfranchised, passed overwhelmingly.
