= John Allan (rugby union, born 1934) =

Scotland international rugby union player

- Full name: John Lewis Forsyth Allan
- Born: 20 August 1934

Rugby union career
- Position: Wing
International career
| Years | Team | Apps | (Points) |
| 1957 | Scotland | 2 | (0) |

John Lewis Forsyth Allan (born 20 August 1934) is a Scottish former international rugby union player.

A wing three-quarter, Allan played rugby union for Cambridge University, where he read law. He was awarded a blue in the 1956 Varsity Match as one of two Scottish wingers, with Arthur Smith featuring on the right wing.

Allan gained Scotland caps for their final two matches of the 1957 Five Nations, replacing Ian Swan. He made his debut against Ireland at Murrayfield and retained his place against England at Twickenham.

== See also ==
- List of Scotland national rugby union players
