= Walter Allan =

Scottish cricketer and medical doctor

Personal information
- Full name: Walter Ramsay Allan
- Born: 26 October 1927; Riccarton, Ayrshire, Scotland
- Died: 12 May 2003 (aged 75); Bolton, Lancashire, England
- Batting: Right-handed
- Relatives: Jimmy Allan (brother)

Domestic team information
- Years: Team
- 1950: Scotland

Career statistics
Competition	First-class
Matches	3
Runs scored	73
Batting average	12.16
100s/50s	–/–
Top score	30
Catches/stumpings	3/–
- Source: Cricinfo, 13 June 2022

Walter 'Peter' Ramsay Allan (26 October 1927 — 12 May 2003) was a Scottish first-class cricketer and surgeon.

The son of Walter Ramsay Allan senior and his wife, Elizabeth Brownlee née Moffat, he was born at Riccarton in October 1927. He was educated at the Edinburgh Academy, before matriculating to read medicine at Lincoln College, Oxford. In 1950, he made three appearances in first-class cricket for Scotland against Ireland, Sussex, and Yorkshire. Allan scored 73 runs in his three matches, with a highest score of 30.

After graduating from Lincoln College, he went up to the University of Edinburgh for his clinical studies, qualifying in 1951. He worked at the Royal Infirmary of Edinburgh and at Stornaway, where he was a house physician and house surgeon respectively. He carried out his National Service in the Royal Army Medical Corps, being commissioned as a lieutenant in October 1952, with promotion to captain following in November 1954, antedated to October 1953.

Upon the completion of his National Service, Allan returned to the civilian medical setting. Allan resumed his surgical training at the Caernarfon and Anglesey Infirmary at Bangor in Wales, before completing his training at Manchester. He remained in the Manchester area, being appointed a senior registrar at the Preston and Manchester Royal Infirmaries. He was later appointed a consultant surgeon at the Bolton Royal Infirmary. In retirement he developed an interest in 18th-century Scottish writers.

Allan was married to Anne Evans, a senior house officer in anaesthetics; the couple had two daughters and two sons. Allan died at Bolton in May 2003. His brother, Jimmy, was also a first-class cricketer.
