= Wal Allan =

Australian rugby league footballer (fl. 1920s)

Playing information
- Position: Wing
Club
Years	Team	Pld	T	G	FG	P
1912	South Sydney	1	0	0	0	0

Wal Allan (sometimes written as Wal Allen) was an Australian professional rugby league footballer of the 1920s. He played one season in the New South Wales Rugby Football League (NSWRFL) Premiership for South Sydney.

== Playing career ==
Allan played only one game in his rugby league career. He made his debut in Round 8, 1923 against the lower-ranked St. George. Playing as a winger, Souths lost the match 5-28. Allan would not play another game of first grade rugby league again. South Sydney would tie Eastern Suburbs for most wins for the season, however Easts would claim the minor premiership via point differential. Souths advanced to the grand final for the first time since 1918 and lost to Easts 15-12, however Allan did not play.
