= George Allan (barrister) =

English barrister and politician

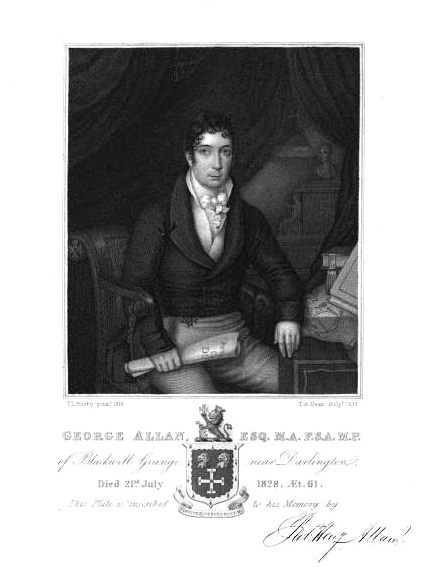
George Allan, engraving after an 1815 portrait

George Allan (1767–1828) was an English barrister and politician.

== Life ==
The son of George Allan (1736–1800) and his wife Anne Nicholson, he was born at Darlington; he was sent to Hertford Grammar School, under John Carr. He matriculated at Trinity College, Cambridge in 1785, and graduated B.A. there in 1789. He was called to the bar in 1790 at the Middle Temple, which he had joined in 1785.

Allan resided at Blackwell Grange. He was elected as Member of Parliament for Durham in 1813, as a Tory opponent of reform and Catholic emancipation. He withdrew as a candidate for Durham in the 1818 general election, not long before the poll. He became a fellow of the Society of Antiquaries of London in 1813.
