= George Allan (footballer, born unknown) =

Scottish association football player

George Allan was a Scottish footballer who played for Leven Thistle, Partick Thistle and Hamilton Academical, as a wing half or inside forward.

Allan joined Partick from Leven Thistle on 22 December 1897. He made his debut against Heart of Midlothian in a 6–2 loss on 25 December the same year. He played his final game for the club on 3 May 1899 in a 4–0 loss against Queen's Park in the Glasgow League. Overall, he made at least 22 appearances and scored 6 goals for the club in all competitions (11 and 6 in the Scottish Football League).

Allan then joined Hamilton, making his Accies debut on 16 September 1899 at home in a friendly against the Kaffirs from Transvaal. Overall, he made 31 appearances for Hamilton (21 in the league) across two seasons, and did not score.
