= George Allan (footballer, born 1885) =

Scottish footballer

Personal information
- Full name: George Allan
- Date of birth: 1885
- Place of birth: Mauchline, Scotland
- Date of death: 14 March 1916 (aged 30–31)
- Place of death: Winchester, England
- Position: Half back

Senior career*
Years	Team	Apps	(Gls)
1905–1912	Partick Thistle	51	(2)
- Ayr United
- * Club domestic league appearances and goals

George Allan (1885 – 14 March 1916) was a Scottish professional footballer who played as a half back in the Scottish League for Partick Thistle and Ayr United.

== Personal life ==
Allan's military service during the First World War began in the Highland Light Infantry. After being commissioned into the London Regiment as a second lieutenant, he was killed in a training accident at Morn Hill Camp, outside Winchester, on 14 March 1916. Whilst being taught how to fire a West Spring Gun, Allan was hit in the face by a trench bomb and died of wounds 10 minutes later. He was buried in Mauchline Cemetery.

== Career statistics ==
Appearances and goals by club, season and competition
Club	Season	League			Scottish Cup		Total	
Club	Season	Division	Apps	Goals	Apps	Goals	Apps	Goals
Partick Thistle	1905–06	Scottish First Division	6	0	0	0	6	0
Partick Thistle	1906–07	Scottish First Division	26	1	1	0	27	1
Partick Thistle	1907–08	Scottish First Division	19	1	3	0	22	1
Career total			51	2	4	0	55	2
