= Alex Allan (footballer) =

Scottish footballer

Personal information
- Full name: Alexander Allan
- Place of birth: Scotland
- Position: Left half

Senior career*
Years	Team	Apps	(Gls)
1915–1917	Queen's Park	15	(0)
- * Club domestic league appearances and goals

Alexander Allan was a Scottish amateur footballer who played as a left half in the Scottish League for Queen's Park.

== Personal life ==
Allan served as a gunner in the Royal Garrison Artillery during the First World War.

== Career statistics ==
Appearances and goals by club, season and competition
Club	Season	League			Other		Total	
Club	Season	Division	Apps	Goals	Apps	Goals	Apps	Goals
Queen's Park	1915–16	Scottish First Division	13	0	0	0	13	0
Queen's Park	1916–17	Scottish First Division	2	0	0	0	2	0
Career total			15	0	0	0	15	0
