= Jock Allan =

Scottish footballer (born c. 1891)

Personal information
- Date of birth: c. 1891
- Place of birth: Cardenden, Scotland
- Height: 5 ft 10 in (1.78 m)
- Position: Full back

Senior career*
| Years | Team | Apps | (Gls) |
- Dunfermline Athletic
| 1910–1911 | Hibernian | 2 | (0) |
| 1911–1913 | East Fife | | |
| 1913–1922 | Bury | 132 | (1) |
| 1922–1923 | Reading | | |
| 1923–1928 | J&P Coats | 120 | (0) |
- * Club domestic league appearances and goals

John Allan was a Scottish footballer who played as a full back. Allan began his career in the Scottish League before moving to The Football League. After he was banned for life by the Football Association for match fixing, Allan moved to the United States and played for five seasons in the American Soccer League.

== Great Britain ==
Allan began his professional career with Dunfermline Athletic. In 1910, he moved to Hibernian F.C. where he played two games in September. He then transferred to East Fife. On 10 May 1913, he transferred to Bury and remained with the team until 1923. On 1 May 1920, Bury tied at Coventry City, which allowed Coventry to remain in the Football League at the expense of Lincoln City. It eventually came to light that Coventry and Bury had conspired to fix the match. On 29 May 1923, after investigating the allegations, the Football Association Management Committee announced that Allan and several other players, managers and executives were banned for life. By then Allan had transferred to Reading, but was immediately released by the team.

== United States ==
Following his suspension by the FA, Allan moved to the United States in 1924 where he signed with J&P Coats of the American Soccer League. He played only three games with Coats at the end of the 1923–1924 season, but became a fixture on the team's backline for the next three seasons. He saw time in only 13 games during the 1927–1928 season. He left the ASL in 1928.
