= John Allan (Australian footballer) =

Australian rules footballer

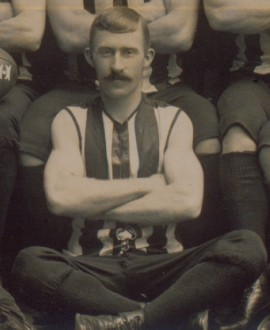
- Allan in 1902

Personal information
- Full name: John William Allan
- Nickname: Son
- Born: 26 October 1879; South Melbourne, Victoria
- Died: 28 December 1933 (aged 54); Port Melbourne, Victoria
- Original team: Blenheim
- Debut: Round 1, 3 May 1902, Collingwood vs. South Melbourne, at Lake Oval

Playing career^{1}
Years	Club	Games (Goals)
1902–1903	Collingwood	19 (9)
- ^{1} Playing statistics correct to the end of 1903.

Career highlights
- VFL premiership player: 1902

John William Allan (26 October 1879 – 28 December 1933) was an Australian rules footballer who played for the Collingwood Football Club in the Victorian Football League (VFL).

Allan played as a wing and forward during two seasons for Collingwood in the VFL. His first season was in 1902 where he played 17 games for the season, including the 1902 Grand Final win over Essendon. In 1903, Allan only played 2 games, ending his VFL career with 19 games and 9 goals.

In 1904, Allan transferred to Port Melbourne, becoming captain in 1905 and later serving as a trainer of the club

Outside his football career he worked as a sawyer until a workplace accident in 1919 resulted in him losing his left arm near the elbow. John "Son" Allan died suddenly in late 1933, survived by his wife and five children.
