= John Allan (footballer, born 1872) =

Scottish footballer

Personal information
- Full name: John Allan
- Date of birth: 1872
- Place of birth: Glasgow, Scotland
- Position: Forward

Senior career*
Years	Team	Apps	(Gls)
- Glasgow Thistle
1893–1894	Derby County	36	(8)
1894–1897	Notts County	79	(27)
–	Heanor Town		
Total		115	(32)
- * Club domestic league appearances and goals

John Allan (born 1872 in Glasgow, Scotland) was a footballer who played in the English Football League for Derby County and Notts County. He also played for Glasgow Thistle and Heanor Town.
