= Philip Bertram Murray Allan =

British lepidopterist, writer and publisher (1884–1973)

Philip Bertram Murray Allan MBE (13 November 1884 – 31 December 1973) was a British lepidopterist and writer who wrote under the initials "O.M.H." (="An Old Moth-Hunter"). He also ran a publishing house Philip Allan and Company.

== Life and career ==
Allan was born in Scarborough. He studied at Charterhouse School and went to Clare College, Cambridge. He worked briefly at the Middlesex Hospital but chose not to pursue medicine and studied history and later became interested in writing, contributing to a dictionary of Latin. During the first World War he worked with Military Intelligence and after that became an editor for the Police Journal and from 1937, the Journal of Criminal Law as well. He collected moths and wrote three books and numerous articles.

In 1916 he married Elsie K Whitehead; there were four children. He died in Colchester in 1973.

Allan wrote several books and several non-entomological works were written under pseudonyms including Philip Murray, Alban A. Philip, and O. Eliphas Keat.

- The Book-Hunter at Home (1920)
- A Moth-Hunter's Gossip (1937)
- Talking of Moths (1943)
- Moths and Memories (1948)
