= Michael Alan =

American painter

Michael Alan (born July 13, 1977, New York, NY) is a New York City-based artist. He works in various media, including drawings, paintings, prints, sculptures, video and performances.

In 2010, Robert Shuster of The Village Voice wrote, in reviewing Alan's solo show Harmonious Opposites, “Alan’s thread-like lines are manically impulsive; they barely go an inch without detouring. Short, jagged strokes, tiny loops, and quick arcs make jittery, skeletal outlines of distorted human forms. Hasty daubs of blues and pinks wrap the frames with translucent skin while also conveying the blur of movement. Alan loves motion; in Move in Distance, a dancer’s five legs, kicking up in successive positions, pay homage to those futurist studies in dynamism. Even the reclining male figure of Prostitution looks restless—the angular, attenuated limbs and their busy surfaces bring to mind one of Egon Schiele’s more anxious self-portraits.”

== Birth and early life ==
Alan was born in New York City. His family moved all over the city, from Queens to Staten Island, to Brooklyn and back. At age 19 he became a co-owner of a nightclub, Michael Alan's Playhouse, through which he began organizing artistic events. With the money saved from his nightclub work, he attended the School of Visual Arts. He received his B.F.A in 2000, and was asked to teach part of the International Studies Program there, from 2009 to 2010.

== Fine art career ==
In 2004, the same day he was featured on the cover of Elemental Magazine with a 6-page spread, his first solo exhibition took place at (former) KMG Gallery in Chelsea. Entitled "Artsiety", the exhibition contained over 90 works. His work has since been featured at McCaig & Welles, Greene Street Gallery, the Chelsea Art Museum, Eastern District, and Gasser Grunert. Group shows include "10 x 10 Decade End" at Whitebox, Art Basel Miami, "Exhibitionists Both" at Jonathan Schorr, "Object Affection" at BOFFO Arts, and the Auction for Art World Digest at Rare Gallery. From 2008 to 2009, he was the Artist In Residence at Teatro Iati.

In addition to his two and three-dimensional pieces, he creates ongoing, limited-engagement projects, such as the Living Installation, where Alan "animates his drawings by transforming spaces and performers. Using an assortment of materials, including prints, casts, paint, and found objects, he builds living sculptures that perform beautiful and treacherous acts." The Living Installation has taken place in Kenny Scharf's Cosmic Cavern, the Gershwin Hotel, and ABC No Rio. His primary focus remains drawing, painting and sculpture.

His work has been covered by The New York Times (video), NBC's Today Show, Marie Claire Italia (an 8-page story including a studio tour), The New York Post, Fox Channel 5, the Village Voice’s “Best in Show”, and Time Out New York. He is represented by Gasser Grunert in Chelsea.
