= John Allan (footballer, born 1931) =

Scottish footballer

Personal information
- Date of birth: 22 March 1931
- Place of birth: Stirling, Scotland
- Date of death: 16 June 2003 (aged 72)
- Place of death: Aberdeen, Scotland
- Position: Centre-forward

Youth career
- Cowie Juveniles

Senior career*
Years	Team	Apps	(Gls)
1953–1955	Dunfermline Athletic	18	(4)
1955–1956	Aberdeen	22	(15)
1956–1958	Third Lanark	37	(28)
1958–1961	Bradford Park Avenue	70	(51)
1961	Halifax Town	10	(1)
1961–1962	Weymouth		
1962–1963	Brechin City		
Total		157	(99)
- * Club domestic league appearances and goals

John Allan (22 March 1931 – 16 June 2003) was a footballer who played in the Scottish Football League for Dunfermline Athletic, Aberdeen and Third Lanark, and in The Football League for Bradford Park Avenue and Halifax Town.
