= John Allan (businessman) =

British businessman (born 1948)

John Allan CBE
- Born: John Murray Allan; 20 August 1948 (age 78)
- Education: St Andrew's High School, Kirkcaldy; University of Edinburgh
- Occupation: Businessman
- Title: Chairman of Tesco (March 2015–2023); Chair of Barratt Developments (November 2014–present); Vice President of the Confederation of British Industry (2020–2021); President of the Confederation of British Industry (2018–2020)
- Spouse: Carole
- Children: 2

John Murray Allan CBE (born 20 August 1948) is a British businessman. He is chair of the housebuilder Barratt Developments, and was president and vice president of the Confederation of British Industry, and chairman of the supermarket chain Tesco.

== Early life ==
Allan was born on 20 August 1948. Allan attended St Andrew’s High School in Kirkcaldy, and studied mathematics at University of Edinburgh.

== Career ==
Allan's experience spans retail, logistics and housebuilding. He was chief executive of Exel, chief financial officer of Deutsche Post, deputy chairman of retailer Dixons Carphone and a non-executive director at Royal Mail. He was chairman of Samsonite and has been a non-executive director at National Grid, PHS Group and Hamleys. Allan was an instrumental figure in the £3.7 billion merger of Dixons and Carphone Warehouse.

In February 2011, Home Secretary Theresa May announced that Allan would join the Home Office as a non-executive member of its supervisory board in an attempt to bring business experience into the government department.

Allan was elected as president of the CBI on 19 June 2018, and was elected for a second term at the 18 June 2019 annual general meeting of members. Allan was succeeded by Lord Karan Bilimoria as president of the organisation on 16 June 2020, and served as vice president from then until stepping down from the board on 21 October 2021.

Allan took over as chairman of Tesco from Sir Richard Broadbent in March 2015. In May 2023 Allan announced he would step down as chairman of the board in June 2023 after admitting making a comment to a female CBI worker in late 2019 about a dress suiting her figure. He was set to continue as chairman of the housebuilder Barratt Developments until September 2023 but on 23 May, Allan said he would be "stepping down as chairman of Barratt Developments plc as of 30 June 2023".
