= Margaret Allan (romance author) =

British author of romance novels

Margaret Allan (8 December 1922 – 27 June 2017) was an author of romance novels from Harrogate, North Yorkshire, England. Her first success as an author came when she entered a short story for a Yorkshire Evening Post competition in 1973, which she won, and she began writing novels professionally in 1975. Allan continued writing well into her 80s, and during her long career published over 40 books. Many of her novels were set in her native county, including a cycle of four stories set in the fictional village of Nydd Beck. Allan described her works as "not goody-goody books [but] not blow by blow descriptions of sex either." Her books have been translated into a number of languages, including Danish and Slovak, and include audio book editions.

Allan died at the age of 94, on 27 June 2017.

== Bibliography ==
- The Mammoth Stone
- Keeper of the Stone
- The Last Mammoth
- Sister of the Sky
- Spirits Walking Woman
- Return to Eden
- By Hope United
- Highland Doctor
- Son of Hamish
- The Doctor At Partridge Hill
- Garden of Love
- The Man From Lamb Hill
- The Song Is Ended
- Long Happiness
- Valley of Rainbows
