= George Allan (composer) =

English composer (1864–1930)

- Born: 21 March 1864
- Died: 16 March 1930 (aged 65)

George Allan (21 March 1864 – 16 March 1930) was an English composer and arranger of music for brass bands who was born, and resided for most of his life, in New Shildon, County Durham, United Kingdom. As a composer he was a contemporary of William Rimmer and J. Ord Hume.

== Early life ==
He was born on March 21, 1864, to parents John James Allan, a Tailor and Draper, and his wife Hannah, at their home in Chapel Street, New Shildon. As a youth he was a choirboy at All Saints Church in Shildon having learned to sing as a child through the Tonic Sol-fa method. His choirmaster suggested that he find out what he could learn by joining a brass band, resulting in his joining the New Shildon Juvenile Brass Band under the tutelage of Edward Dinsdale (Uncle to New Shildon's other notable composer/arranger Thomas Edward Bulch 1862–1930). He initially learned to play baritone horn, before gradually progressing to become a solo tenor horn player. Allan eventually was promoted from the juvenile band into the senior New Shildon Saxhorn Band, under bandmaster Francis Dinsdale (Grandfather of Thomas Bulch).

When Francis Dinsdale relinquished the post of bandmaster of the New Shildon Saxhorn Band prior to his death in December 1884, George Allan inherited the role. This opportunity arose in part through Thomas Bulch having already become bandmaster of a breakaway New Shildon Temperance Brass Band a few years earlier.

== Career ==
On reaching working age George Allan initially worked as a labourer, before taking up a post as a Blacksmith's Striker at the North Eastern Railway wagon works at Shildon, where for a short while he worked alongside Thomas Bulch before the latter emigrated to Australia in 1884. He was also a subscribing member of the local Mechanics Institute which had been founded in the town by the railway pioneer Timothy Hackworth.

Between the mid-1880s and his death in 1930, George Allan composed and/or arranged a considerable repertoire of pieces of music for brass band, with some being also published as military band arrangements that included additional reed instruments. Many of these were published initially by T. A. Haigh's "Amateur Brass Band and Military Journal" based in Hull. Later compositions were published by Fred Richardson's "The Cornet Brass and Military Band Journal". This latter journal, and rights to all the pieces featured therein, were later acquired by music publishers Wright and Round who continue to publish a selection of George Allan compositions as part of their archive catalogue. Allan also self-published compositions, particularly in later life from his home at 2 Pears Terrace, New Shildon up until the end of 1924 and then from 4 Osbourne Terrace, Leeholme from 1925 onwards; these addresses being generally always printed at under the title of the piece on each sheet.

== Personal life ==
From 1896, until the year of his death, George Allan also offered his services, and was engaged, as an adjudicator for brass band contests around the North-East of England, and Southern Scotland. In July 1902, Allan changed occupation to that of Wagon Painter, which he maintained until his retirement in Feb 1925 after which he moved from Shildon to nearby Leeholme.

He was married to Elizabeth Willoughby on 16 August 1887 at St Anne's Church, Bishop Auckland. The couple had 3 children; Beatrice, William Willoughby and Lillie. Elizabeth died in August 1911 leaving George a widower. He did not remarry.

Between 1917 and 1929, George Allan was the conductor of the orchestra for the New Shildon All Saints Amateur Operatic Society.

Allan died on 16 March 1930, and was interred alongside his wife in the churchyard at All Saints Church in Shildon. A commemorative stone was unveiled opposite Shildon's town square during the 1970s.

During his lifetime, George Allan wrote at least 70 marches, as well as some concert pieces and pieces of dance music. He is best known today for his contest marches (pieces designed to show every section of a brass band at its best) a number of which continue to be played. These include "Knight Templar", "Senator" and "The Wizard".

== Selected Compositions ==
- Battle Abbey - (march)
- Belle of Bohemia, The - (waltz)
- Belmont - (contest march)
- Binchester - (march)
- Blytheville - (march)
- Boscombe - (quick march)
- Bravura - (contest march)
- Cavalier - (overture)
- Collier, The - (march)
- Cyclone, The - (march)
- Darlington - (march)
- Diomed - (contest march)
- Diplomat, The - (march)
- Elmville - (march)
- Everest - (contest march)
- Florence - (quadrille)
- Gabriani - (overture)
- Gale, The - (contest march)
- Granville - (march)
- Imperioso - (march)
- Impetus - (march)
- Jupiter - (march)
- King Edward - (overture)
- Knight Templar - (contest march)
- Lefebvre - (contest march)
- Lonsdale - (march)
- Lunedale - (march)
- Lyndhurst - (march)
- Nevada - (waltz)
- New Century, The - (fantasia)
- Niobe - (march)
- No Retreat - (march)
- On Parade - (march)
- Pendragon - (march)
- Penelope - (set of waltzes)
- Phantom - (march)
- Raby - (march)
- Red Cross, The - (fantasia)
- Repulse, The - (march)
- Romola - (overture)
- Royal Festival - (fantasia)
- Runaway - (galop)
- La Rustica - (overture)
- Rusticus - (fantasia)
- Senator - (march)
- Shawville - (march)
- Silverdale - (march)
- Silver King - (march)
- Sons of Toil - (march)
- Storm Fiend, The - (march)
- Ovation, The - (march)
- Village Feast, The - (fantasia)
- Vigilant - (march)
- Wanderer, The - (march)
- Waverley - (march)
- Windlestone - (march)
- Wizard, The - (march)
- York - (march)
