= Jack Allan (golfer) =

Scottish golfer

Personal information
- Full name: Alexander John Travers Allan
- Nickname: Jack
- Nationality: Scotland
- Born: 17 November 1875 Portland, Dorset, England
- Died: 3 March 1898 (aged 22) Edinburgh, Scotland

Career
- Sport: Golf
- Status: Amateur
- British Amateur: Won: 1897

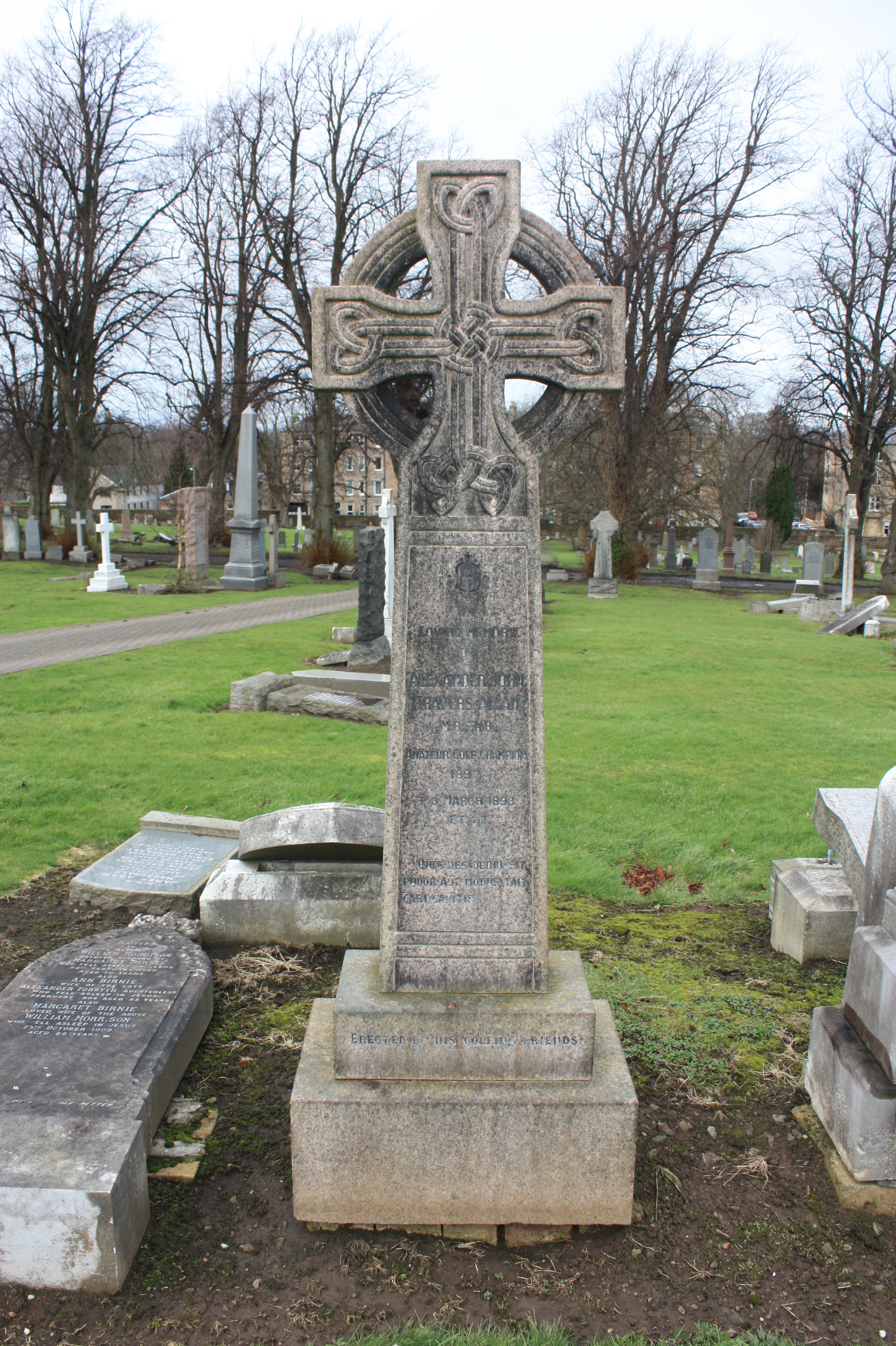
The grave of Jack Allan, Morningside Cemetery, Edinburgh

Alexander John Travers Allan, MBChB, known generally as Jack Allan, (17 November 1875 – 3 March 1898) was a Scottish amateur golfer and medical student. He is best known for winning the 1897 British Amateur.

== Biography ==
Allan was born on the Isle of Portland in Dorset, the son of Margaret Bird Munro and Surgeon Colonel Alexander Allan (1836–1892), a Scottish surgeon working there in the Royal Navy Hospital.

He studied medicine at the University of Edinburgh and had graduated MBChB. While studying for his full qualification as a doctor (MD), and was probably undergoing practical training at the Edinburgh Royal Infirmary, when he contracted tuberculosis.

He died in Edinburgh of tuberculosis at the age of 22. He is buried in the southern section of Morningside Cemetery. His parents are buried opposite.

== Major championships ==
=== Amateur wins (1) ===
Year	Championship	Winning score	Runner-up
1897	The Amateur Championship	4 & 2	(Scotland) James Robb

This was Allan's only appearance in the Amateur Championship.
