= Elsner =

Elsner is a German surname. Notable people with the surname include:

- Branko Elsner (1929–2012), Slovenian footballer and manager
- David Elsner (born 1992), German ice hockey player
- Gisela Elsner (1937–1992), German writer
- Hannelore Elsner (1942–2019), German actress
- James Elsner (born c. 1959), American atmospheric scientist, geographer, and statistician
- Joseph Elsner (disambiguation), multiple people

- Józef Elsner (1769–1854), composer
- Joseph Elsner (architect) (1845–1933), German architect

- Luka Elsner (born 1982), Slovenian footballer and manager
- Marko Elsner (1960–2020), Slovenian footballer
- Rok Elsner (born 1986), Slovenian footballer

== See also ==
- Elstner
