= Aleyn (surname) =

Aleyn is a surname. Notable people with the surname include:

- Simon Aleyn (died 1565), the likely subject of the famous ballad, "The Vicar of Bray"
- Charles Aleyn (died c. 1640), English poet
- William Aleyn (fl. 1430–1448), English pirate
- John Aleyn (disambiguation)
