= Johnny Allen =

Johnny Allen may refer to:

- Johnny Allen (arranger) (1917–2014), American R&B arranger
- Johnny Allen (baseball) (1904–1959), Major League Baseball player
- Johnny Allen (racing driver) (born 1934), NASCAR driver, 1955–1967
- Johnny Allen (American football) (1933–2010), American football player
- Johnny Allen (coach), American college and high school athletics coach
- Johnny Allen (EastEnders), a fictional character in the BBC soap opera
- Johnny Allen Hendrix or Jimi Hendrix, (1942–1970), American rock guitarist

== See also ==
- John Allen (disambiguation)
- Jonny Allan (born 1983), English footballer
