= Jesuit Church, Mannheim =

Catholic church in Mannheim, Baden-Württemberg, Germany

Coordinates: 49°29′10″N 8°27′40″E

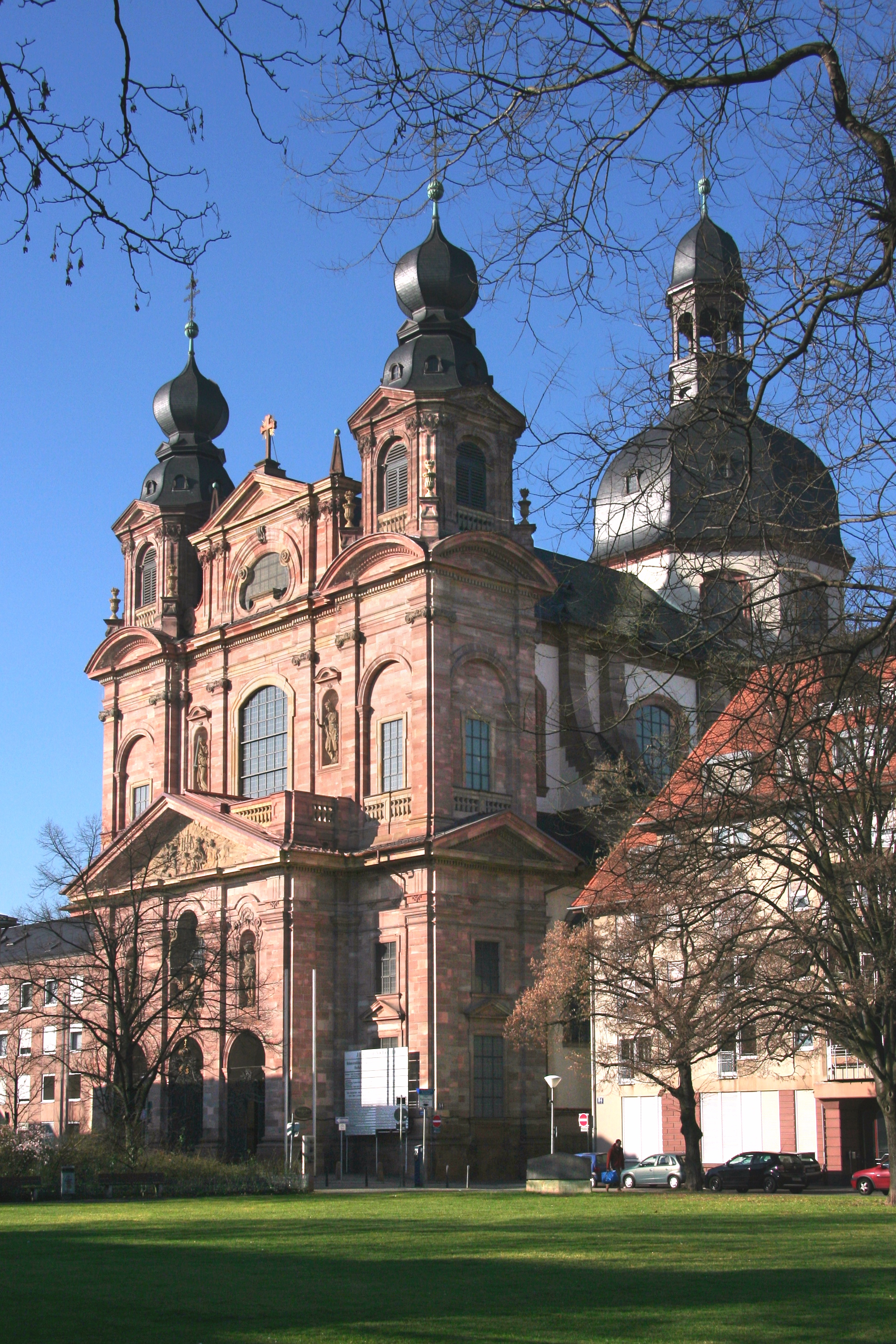
Mannheim Jesuit Church

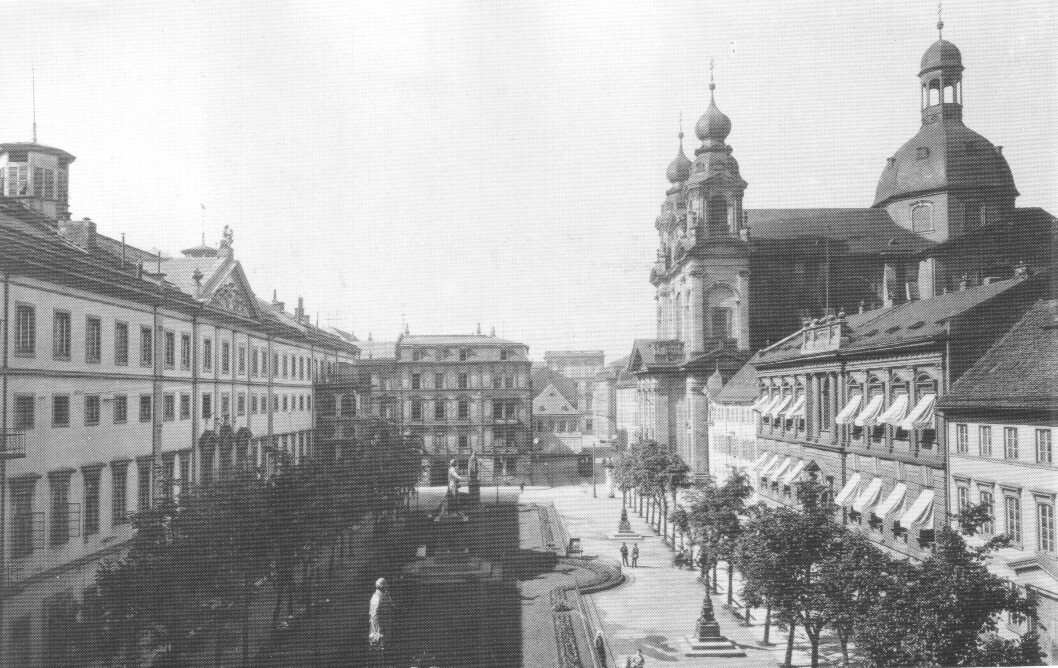
Jesuit church, and National Theatre 1900

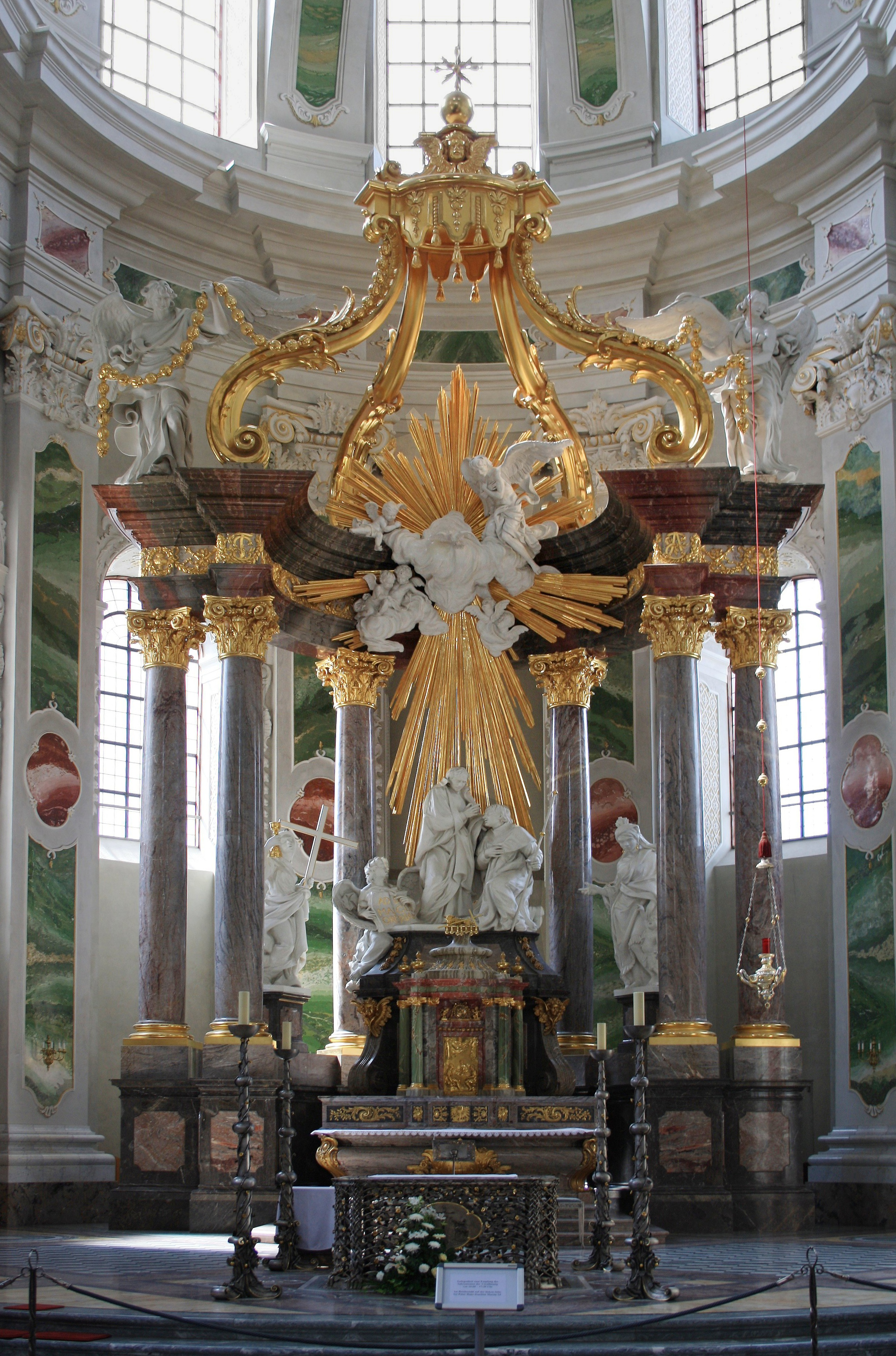
High Altar

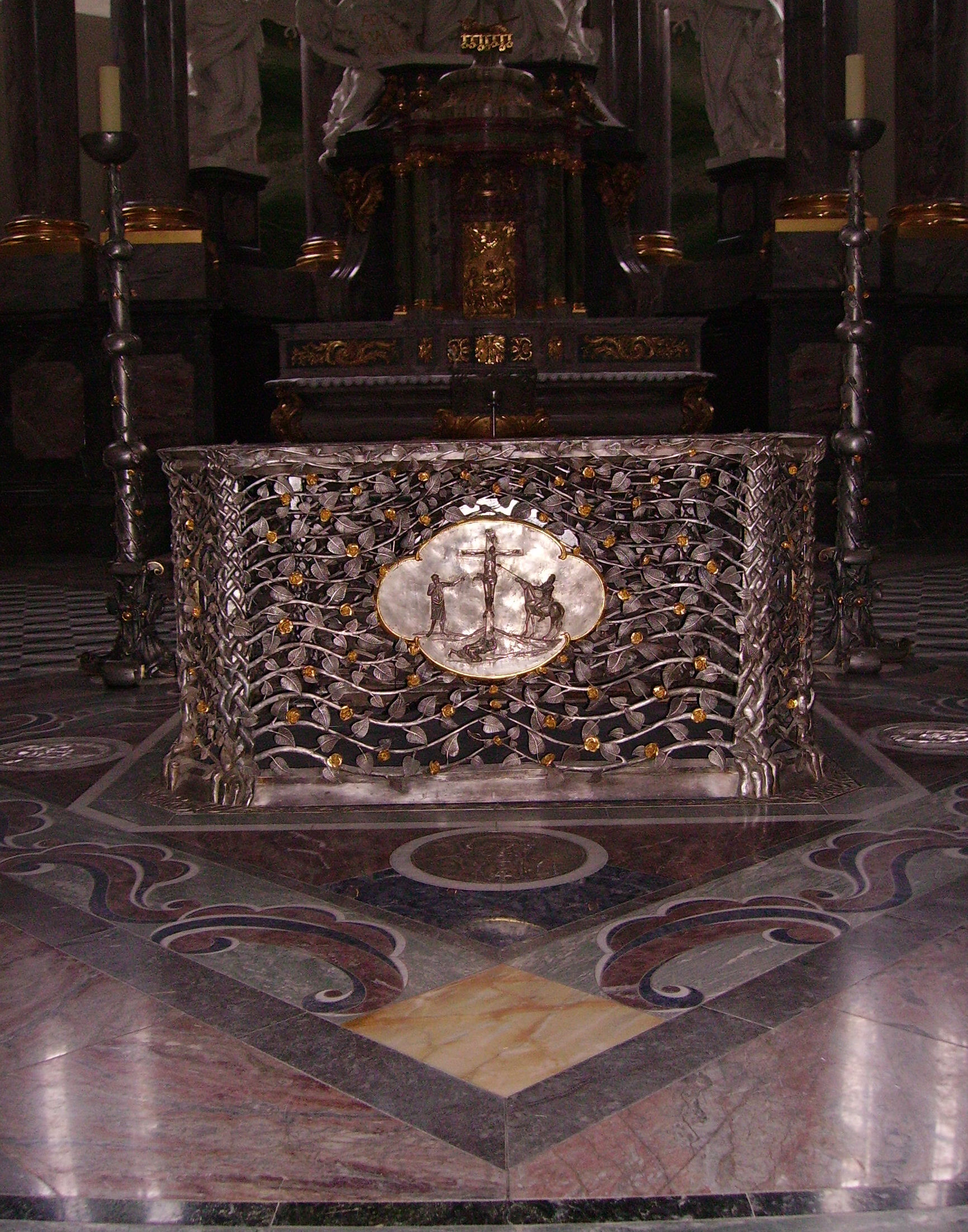
High altar in Silver and Bronze

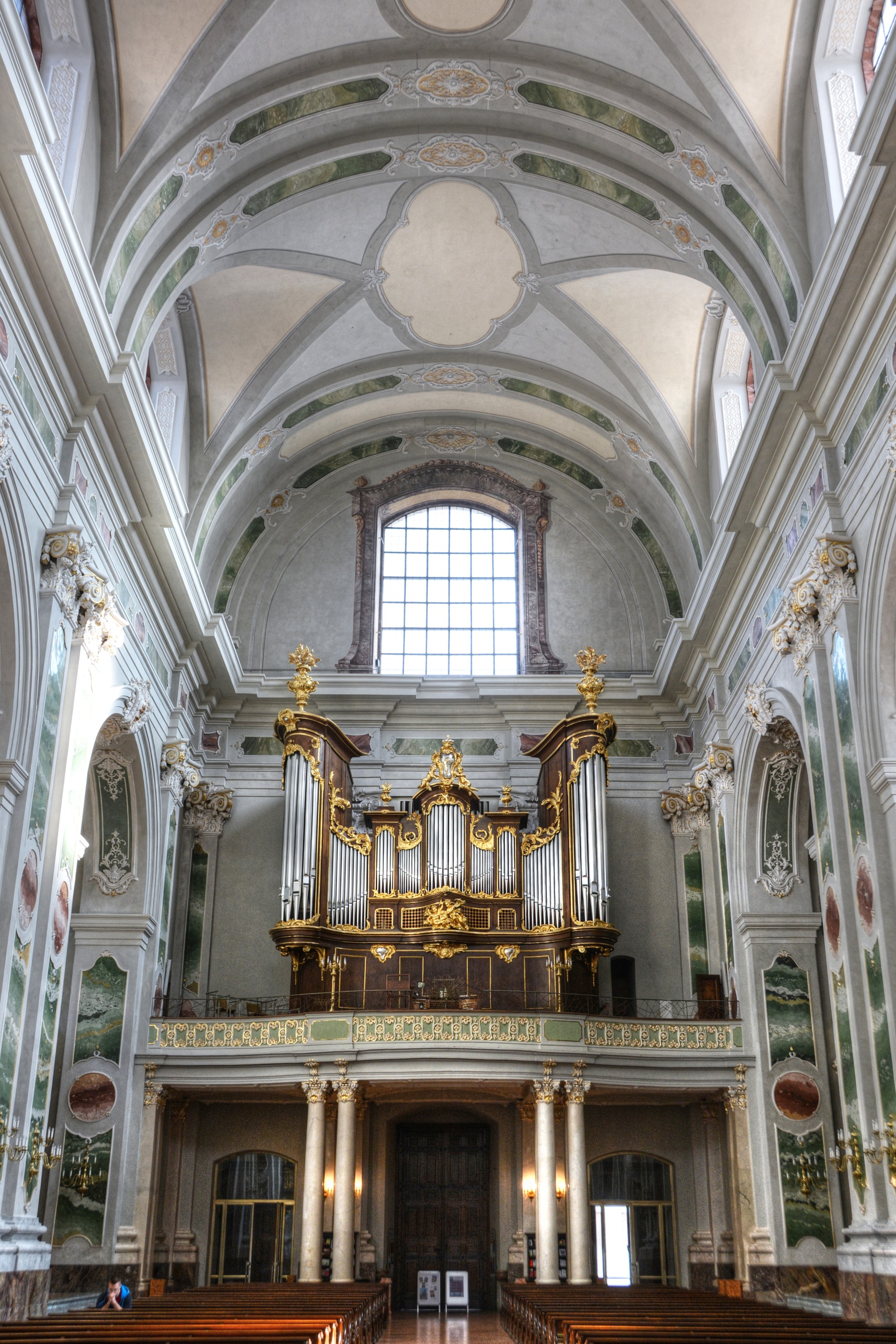
Organ, entrance

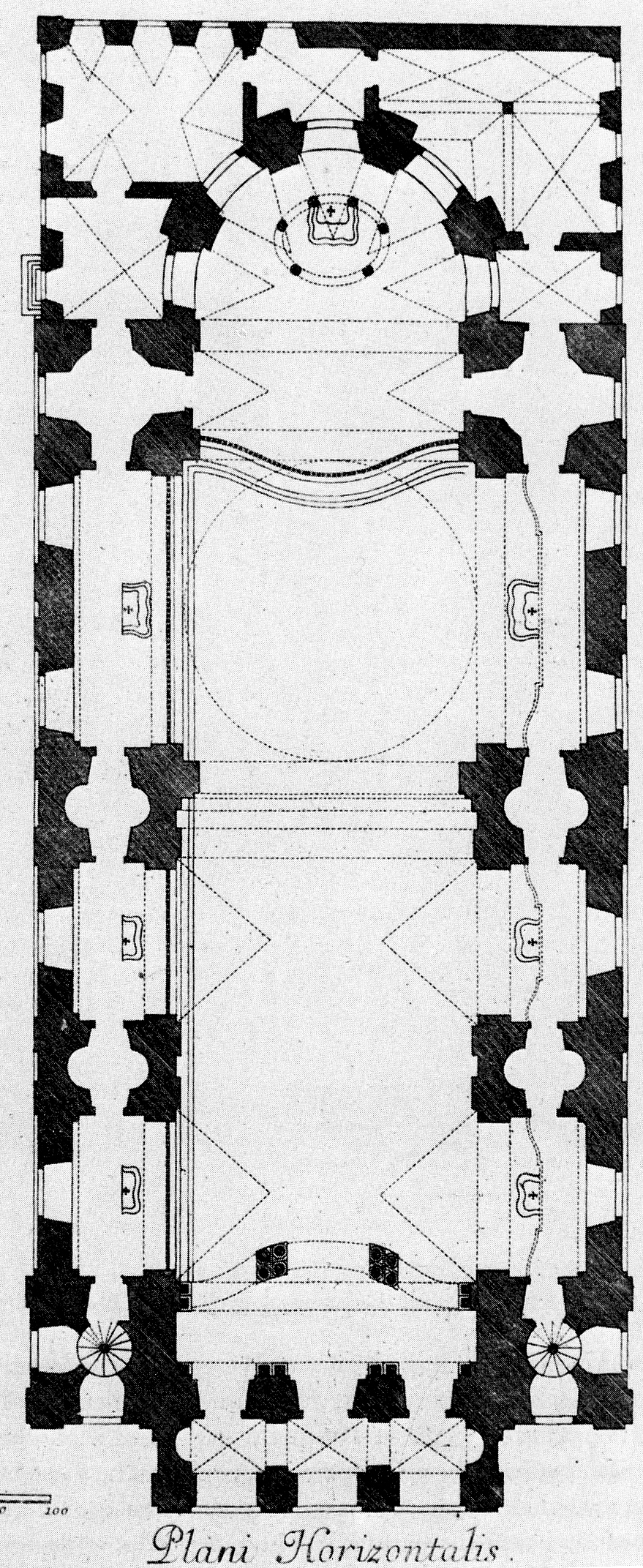
Floorplan

The Mannheim Jesuit Church is a Catholic church of historic and artistic importance in Mannheim, Germany. Church construction was begun in 1733 and completed in 1760. It was consecrated to St. Ignatius of Loyola and St. Francis Xavier. During the Second World War, the church suffered severe damage from air attacks; after the war it was rebuilt in its historical style using original parts.

The church displays many Baroque features in its exterior and interior. The exterior includes a twin towered facade, statues of the four cardinal virtues, and a 75 m high dome. The interior includes marble pilasters, a dome decorated with scenes from the life of the order's founder, and several organs. The most important sculpture is the 1747 "Crowned Silver Madonna." The Mannheim Baroque bell was cast in 1754, and recast in 1956 into five bells. In 1975 another two bells were cast. The bells are now distributed between the exterior two towers.

== History ==
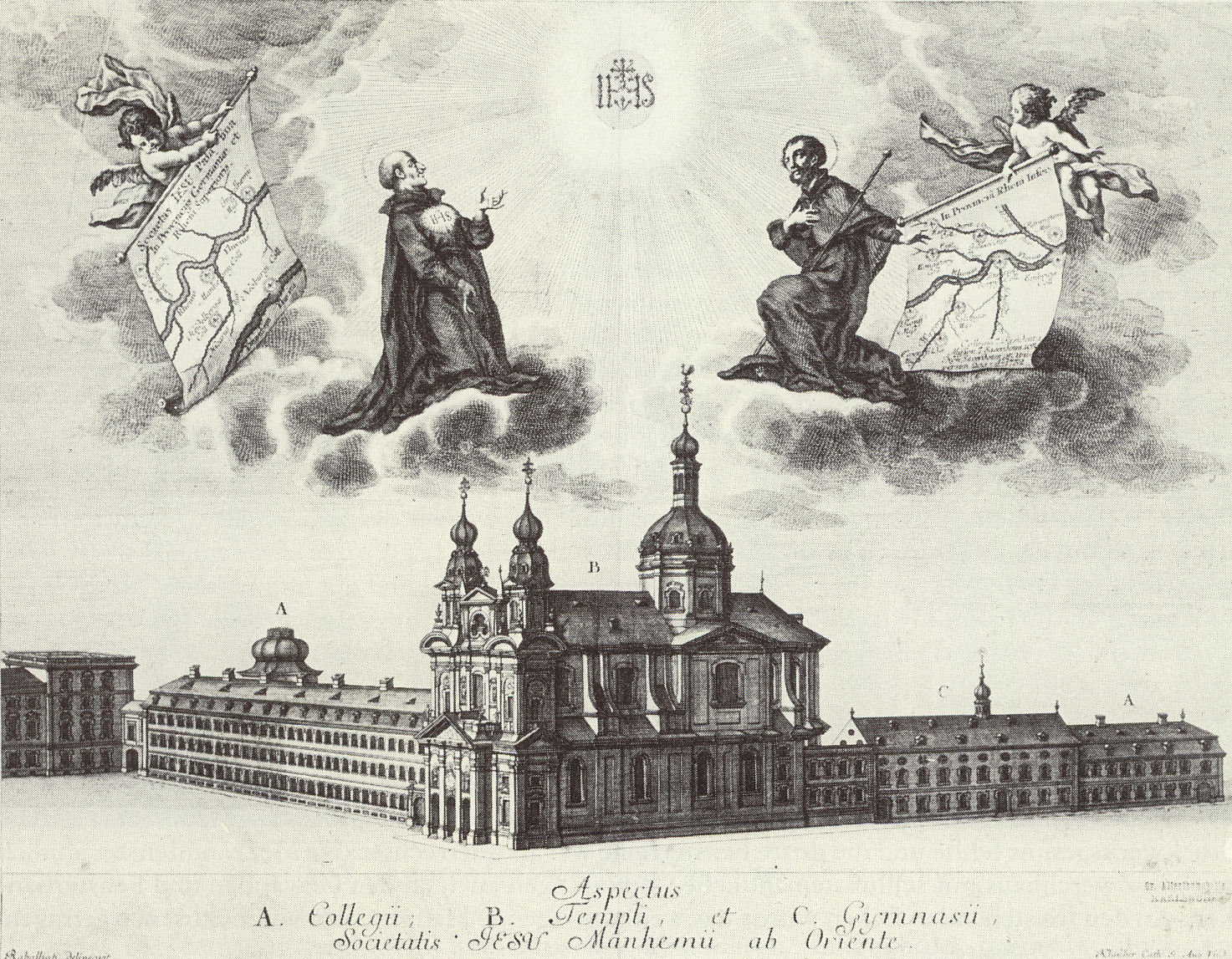
Jesuit Church and College of 1753

The church was built between 1733 in 1756 as the Court Church of the Mannheim electors Charles Philip III and Charles Theodore to a design of the Italian architect Alessandro Galli da Bibiena. It was completed in 1760 and consecrated to St. Ignatius of Loyola and St. Francis Xavier by the Prince Bishop of Augsburg, Joseph of Hesse-Darmstadt.

Features of the exterior are the twin towered facade of red sandstone, the statues of the four cardinal virtues, the Pheme, by Baroque sculptor Paul Egell, which adorns the 75 m-high dome.

The marble pilastered interior is in a late Baroque-early classical style. Egid Quirin Asam from Munich was instructed to decorate the church. He decorated the dome with scenes from the life of the order's founder, St. Ignatius of Loyola, while the nave had an over 400 square metre fresco whose content referred to the subject of the high altar, namely the Mission of St. Francis Xavier to India.

On the occasion of city's 300th anniversary in 1906 the church was extensively renovated. The two statues of the founders of the Jesuit order in the lobby are by the sculptor Thomas Buscher. During the Second World War, the church suffered severe damage from British and American air attacks, especially the choir and the dome. After the war it was decided to rebuild the church in its historical style with the use of original parts in the reconstruction of the approximately 20 metres high marble altar of Peter Anton von Verschaffelt, and the electoral pews.

== Furniture ==
Even today, this church is still very rich in Baroque art. It still has the six side altars and font by Verschaffelt. In the crossing beneath the dome there are four frescoes representing the continents by the Mannheim Baroque painter Philip Jerome Brinckmann. The confessionals were reconstructed like the electoral pews. The most important sculpture is the 1747 "Crowned Silver Madonna" of Augsburg silversmith, Joseph Ignaz Saler. The destroyed frescoes by Egid Quirin Asam were not restored. Today's pulpit was only placed here after the war. It was created in 1753 and originally came from the Carmelite convent in Heidelberg. In the lobby there are very richly ornamented wrought iron gates made by the Mannheim master locksmith Philip Reinhard Sieber in 1755 and two monuments of the church from 1906.

The main organ case in the west gallery is built according to a design of the elector’s court sculptor Paul Egell. It survived the bombing and the small damage it suffered was repaired in 1952. In 1965 an instrument from the workshop of Johannes Klais of Bonn was installed. In 2004 this was optimized acoustically. The four manual organ has 62 registers. In the left side gallery is the choir organ. The case is by an anonymous artist. It was constructed for the Catholic Church in Fuerth in Odenwald in 1751/52. In 1961 it was transferred to Mannheim and contains 16 registers from the case of the post-war Egell organ. The instrument is now technically unreliable and will be replaced by a new one.

To take into account the current requirements of the liturgy the high altar was reconstructed and the choir redesigned. Klaus Ringwald created an altar of silver and bronze, with a new design of the sanctuary and four very large candlesticks. In the new marble floor of the nave a memorial plate with the names of the Jesuits buried in the crypt together with the name of the longtime rector and the Mannheim honorary citizen Fr. Joseph Bauer.

=== Bells ===
The largest Mannheim Baroque bell, cast 1754 by Johann Michael Steiger, was recast in 1956 by Frederick William Schilling into five bells and in 1975 the Heidelberg Bell Foundry cast another two bells. The eight bells are distributed between both towers; the two largest hang in the North West tower, the other bells in the south-west tower.

No.	Year	Foundry	Diameter (mm)	Weight (kg)	Nominal Tone
1	1956	F. W. Schilling	2023	4 935	g°
2	1956	F. W. Schilling	1671	2 772	b°
3	1956	F. W. Schilling	1477	1 921	c′
4	1754	J. M. Steiger	1275	1 400	es′
5	1956	F. W. Schilling	1094	857	f′
6	1956	F. W. Schilling	1006	700	g′
7	1975	Heidelberger Glockengießerei	892	511	b′
8	1975	Heidelberger Glockengießerei	790	362	c″

== Notable clergy ==
In the Jesuit Church and the separate parish, inter alia, the following priests have worked:

- 1839–1846 Johann Baptist Orbin, later Archbishop of Freiburg (1882–1886)
- 1864–1893 Caspar Koch, spiritual counsellor
- 1893–1895 Karl Fritz Pfarrverweser, later archbishop of Freiburg (1920–1931)
- 1895–1951 Joseph Bauer, the first dean of the City deanery and honorary citizen of Mannheim
- 1951–1974 Charles Nicholas, dean
- 1974–1984 Charles Munch, spiritual counsellor
- 1984–2005 Mgr. Horst Schroff, dean
- Since 2005 Karl Jung, dean

== Literature ==
- Eva-Maria Günther: Die Jesuitenkirche in Mannheim. Lindenberg 2005, ISBN 3-89870-245-6
- Karl Weich: Mannheim - das neue Jerusalem. Die Jesuiten in Mannheim 1720–1773. Mannheim 1997, ISBN 3-920671-17-1
