= Frauenkirche, Nuremberg =

Coordinates: 49°27′14″N 11°04′41″E

Frauenkirche
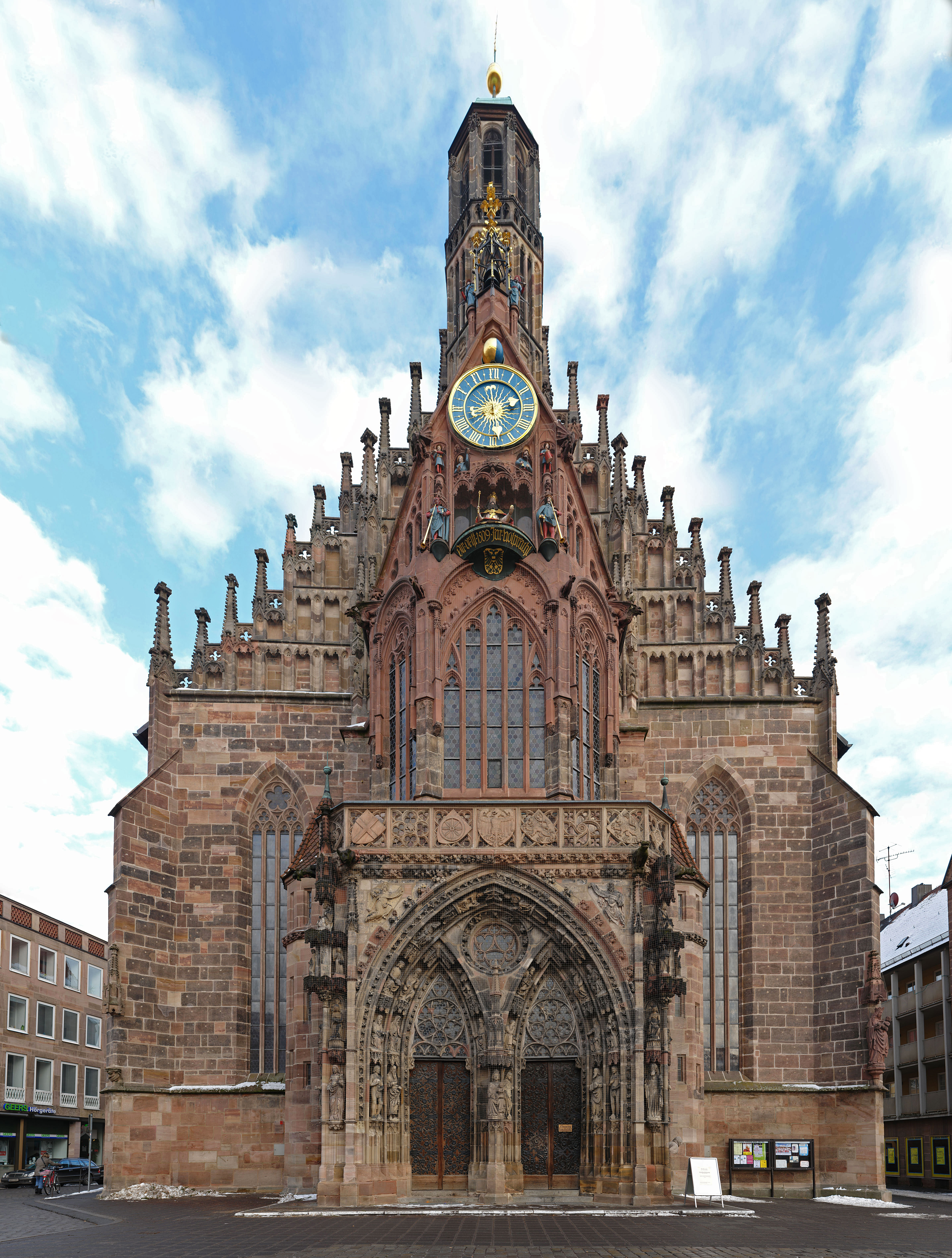
- West façade
- Frauenkirche
- Location: Nuremberg
- Country: Germany
- Denomination: Roman Catholic

History
- Status: Parish church
- Consecrated: 1358

Architecture
- Functional status: Active
- Style: Gothic
- Groundbreaking: 1352
- Completed: 1361

Administration
- Archdiocese: Bamberg
- Parish: Parish of Our Lady; German: Pfarramt Unsere liebe Frau

Clergy
- Pastor: Markus Bolowich

The Frauenkirche ("Church of Our Lady") is a church in Nuremberg, Germany. It stands on the eastern side of the main market. An example of brick Gothic architecture, it was built on the initiative of Charles IV, Holy Roman Emperor between 1352 and 1362. The church contains many sculptures, some of them heavily restored. Numerous works of art from the Middle Ages are kept in the church, such as the so-called Tucher Altar (c. 1440, originally the high altar of the Augustinian church of St. Vitus), and two monuments by Adam Kraft (c. 1498). It has been a parish church of the Catholic Church since 1810.

== History ==
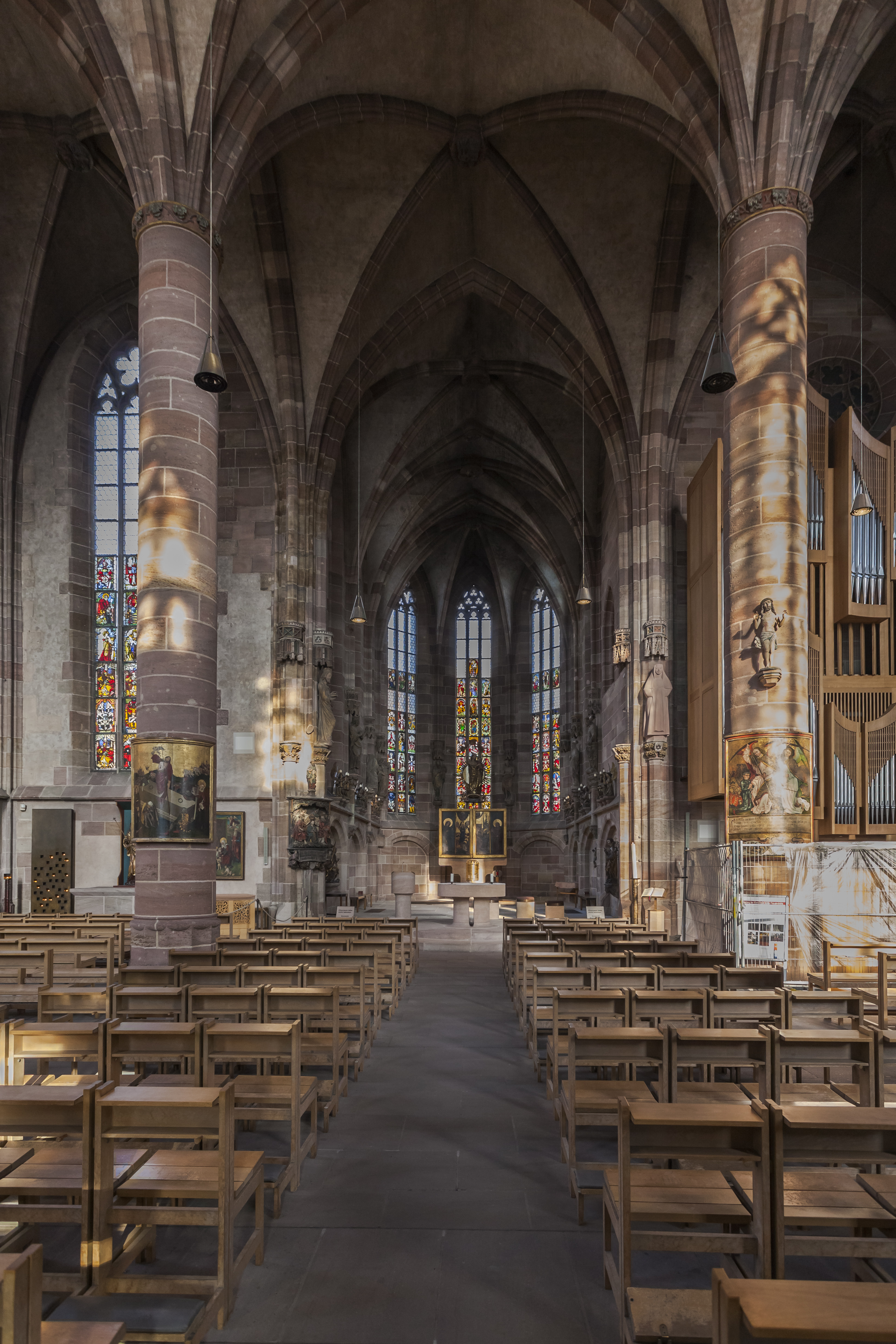
Interior of the church

Following an outbreak of the Black Death in 1349, a Christian pogrom against the Jewish inhabitants of Nuremberg took place, and they were expelled from the city. Emperor Charles IV ordered the synagogue of Nuremberg to be destroyed to make way for the development of the grand market (Hauptmarkt), at which also a church was to be built on the rubble. This became the Frauenkirche. The architect was probably Peter Parler. Emperor Charles IV wanted to use the Frauenkirche for imperial ceremonies, which is reflected in the porch with the balcony, and in the fact that the church is relatively unadorned except for the coats of arms of the Holy Roman Empire, the seven Electors, the town of Nuremberg, and the city of Rome, where the Holy Roman Emperors were crowned. Construction of the church continued until the 1360s.

Charles IV's son Wenceslas was baptized in the church in 1361, on which occasion the Imperial Regalia, including the imperial reliquaries, were displayed to the people. References to Wenceslaus can be found throughout the sculptural program of the church. Beginning in 1423, the Imperial Regalia were kept permanently in Nuremberg and displayed to the people once a year on a special wooden platform constructed for that purpose. In 1442 and 1443 Heinrich Traxdorf from Mainz built a "medium and a small organ". In 1487 the sacristy burned down. It was rebuilt in 1496. The church was surrounded by market stalls and medieval buildings, later removed. The current west gable of the church dates from 1506 to 1508 and was designed by Adam Kraft. Historic images show that this gable was once richly decorated with sculptures which were presumably destroyed in the Reformation. In 1525 the church became Lutheran and galleries were added in the aisles. In 1810, the church was acquired by a Catholic parish which removed the galleries and restored the church in 1816 under the direction of Lorenz Rotermundt. This restoration involved replacing and repairing surviving sculptures and gathering Medieval art to adorn the church.

The church was almost completely destroyed in the Second World War in the bombing of Nuremberg with only the nave walls and facade remaining. This damage was repaired by 1953. There was a more extensive restoration between 1989 and 1991. Since 1948, the balcony of the church, below the Männleinlaufen, has been used for the opening ceremony of the Christkindlesmarkt. The church parish and the neighboring Parish of St. Elizabeth are known collectively as the "Katholische Innenstadtkirche Nürnberg" (Catholic Downtown churches of Nuremberg).

== Architecture and furnishing ==
The west facade of the Frauenkirche is richly decorated with a central porch creating a narthex and an elaborate projection above flanked by two engaged stair towers. The portals on the porch are decorated on the west with sculptures of Adam, Eve, the Virgin, and prophets. On the left, the porch is decorated with male saints, while on the right are female saints. At the corners are sculptures of royal benefactors. The porch encloses a narthex that is richly polychromed (a later restoration). All four sides of the narthex have portals, the jambs and archivolts of which are decorated with sculptures. The second stage of the porch features a complex tracery balustrade with heraldic shields and blind round arches framing the pointed arched windows. Within the narthex, the ribs are completely decorated with sculptures and the main entry to the church features a tympanum showing the Nativity. The stepped gable of the west facade features a series of arcades that once contained sculpture. Each step is topped with a quatrefoil and is demarcated by pinnacles. In the center is a narrow octagonal tower with a copper dome. The other facades of the church, by contrast, are very plain.

The Frauenkirche is a hall church with two aisles and a tribune for the emperor. The church contains nine bays supported by four columns. The triforium, named the Imperial Loft or St. Michael's Loft, opens on to the nave by means of an arcade, the arches of which are filled with floating tracery, consisting of three rosettes supported by a segmental arch.

Inside the Frauenkirche, numerous works of art from the Middle Ages are displayed, but they often only came to the church in the early 19th century, when it was re-established for Catholic worship after centuries of Protestant use. For example, the so-called "Cloth altar" (around 1440/1450) comes from the demolished Augustinian church, the Perringdorf sandstone epitaph by Adam Kraft (around 1498) was also from the Augustinian monastery. However, many of the original medieval furnishings of the Frauenkirche have been preserved, albeit in museums rather than in the church itself. Surviving remnants include: a stone sculpture cycle from around 1360 in the choir (including adoration of the kings and St. Wenceslas; an Annunciation angel and candlestick angel from the school of Veit Stoss (early 16th century); remains of the first high altar table around 1400 (the painted panels are today in the Germanic National Museum in Nuremberg and in Frankfurt's Städel Museum); and several terracotta sculptures, some of which are in the Prague National Gallery. The successor on the high altar, the so-called "Catfish" retable from the early 16th century, is only preserved in fragments today (in the Germanic National Museum). The famous “Nuremberg Tonapostel” from around 1400 was originally in the Frauenkirche and is divided between the German National Museum and St. James Church. A rosary tablet from the area around Veit Stoss is also in the Germanic National Museum today. The stained glass in the choir dates from 1519 and depicts saints and crests.

== Männleinlaufen ==
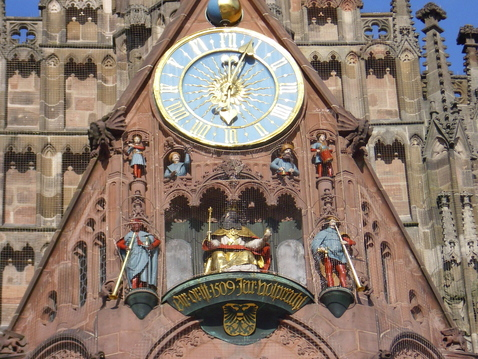
The Männleinlaufen

One of the most notable features of the church is the Männleinlaufen (little men's procession), a mechanical clock that commemorates the Golden Bull of 1356. The clock was installed in the church between 1506 and 1509. The Holy Roman Emperor is shown seated with the prince-electors surrounding him.

The clock mechanism is activated at midday, when a bell is rung to start the sequence and is followed by the trumpeters and drummer. Then there is a procession of the electors around the figure of the Holy Roman Emperor.

== Organ ==
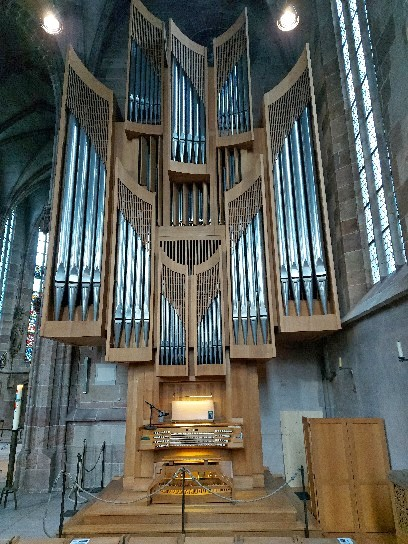
The Klais organ (2021)

The earliest reference of a church organ dates from 1442. The current organ was built in 1988 by Klais Orgelbau of Bonn, re-using 20 ranks from the previous instrument.

I Hauptwerk C–a^{3}
26.	Gedackt	16′
27.	Principal	8′
28.	Doppelflöte	8′
29.	Gemshorn	8′
30.	Octave	4′
31.	Spitzflöte	4′
32.	Quinte	2^{2}/_{3}′
33.	Superoctave	2′
34.	Mixtur V
35.	Cornet V	8′
36.	Trompete	8′

II Positiv C–a^{3}
14.	Bourdon	8′
15.	Quintade	8′
16.	Principal	4′
17.	Flötgedeckt	4′
18.	Nasard	2^{2}/_{3}′
19.	Octave	2′
20.	Terz	1^{3}/_{5}′
21.	Larigot	1^{1}/_{3}′
22.	Scharff IV
23.	Cromorne	8′
24.	Vox humana	8′
25.	Tremulant

III Schwellwerk C–a^{3}
1.	Holzprincipal	8′
2.	Rohrflöte	8′
3.	Gamba	8′
4.	Vox coelestis	8′
5.	Geigenprincipal	4′
6.	Flûte octaviante	4′
7.	Blockflöte	2′
8.	Plein jeu V
9.	Basson	16′
10.	Trompette harmonique	8′
11.	Hautbois	8′
13.	Tremulant

Pedal C–a^{1}
39.	Principalbaß	16′
40.	Subbaß	16′
41.	Quinte	10^{2}/_{3}′
42.	Octave	8′
43.	Rohrgedackt	8′
44.	Tenoroctave	4′
45.	Rauschpfeife IV
46.	Posaune	16′
47.	Trompete	8′

- Couplers: II/I, III/I, III/II, I/P, II/P, III/P, III 4'/P (Nr. 12, 37, 38, 48–51)
- Registration aids: Two free combinations, 32-bit electronic combination settings

== Trivia ==
The church building appears in the background of a scene in Leni Riefenstahl's 1935 propaganda film Triumph of the Will in which Adolf Hitler receives salutes from Nazi troops as they march through the center of Nuremberg.

== Gallery ==
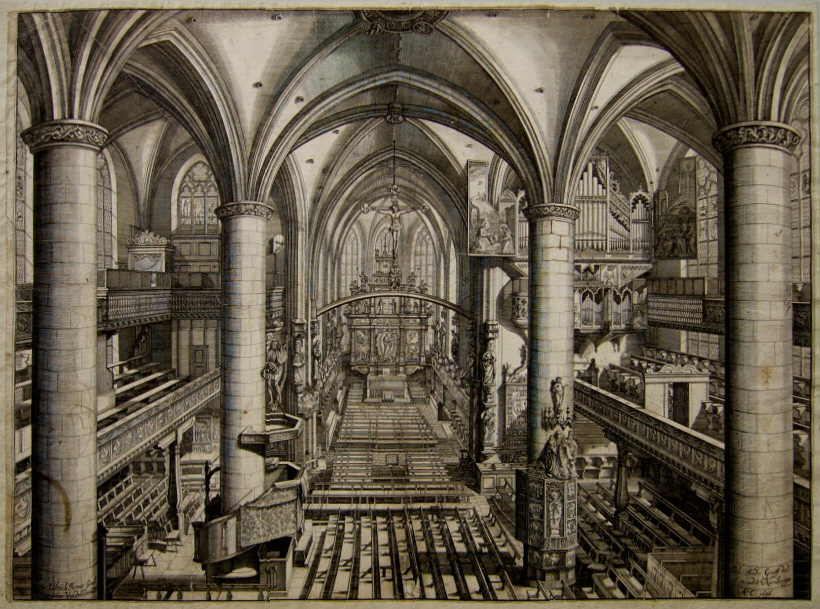
Print showing the interior of the church in 1696

Adolf Hitler with the Nuremberg Frauenkirche in the background, 1928

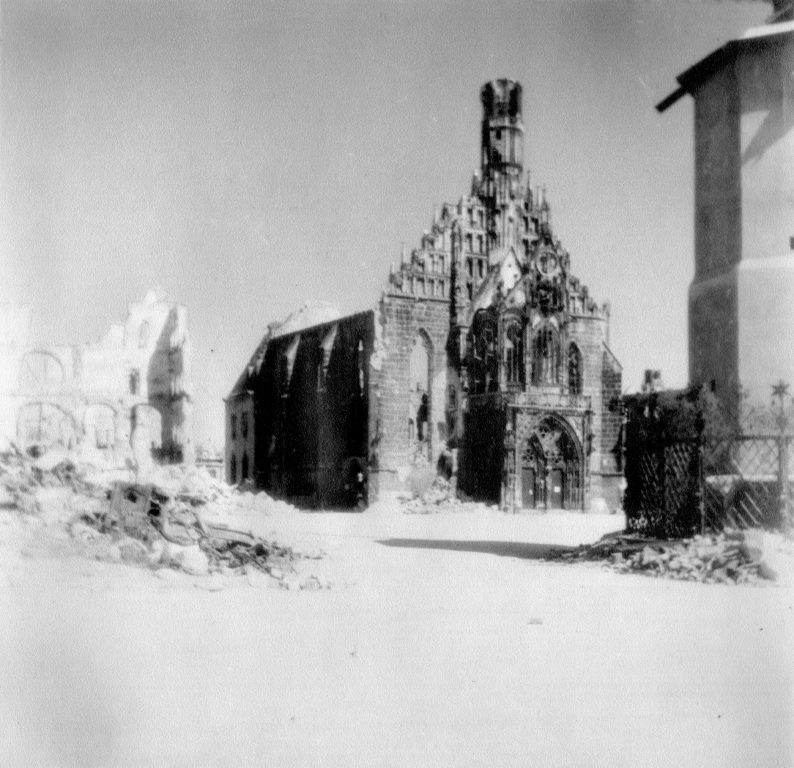
Frauenkirche following the Bombing of Nuremberg

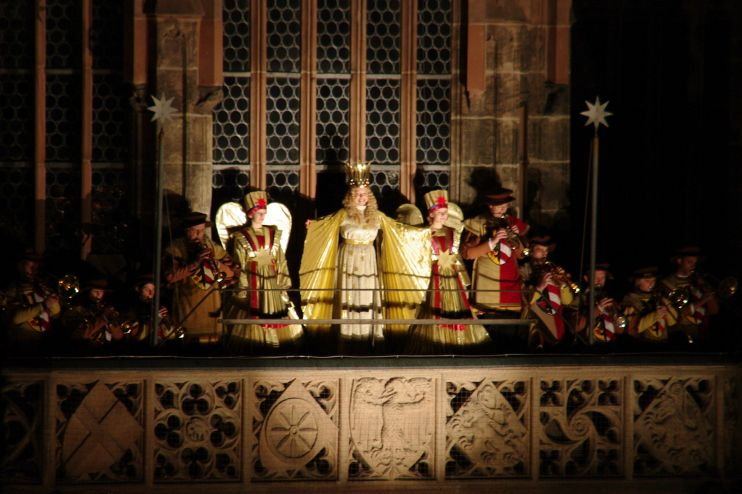
Christkindlesmarkt opening speech

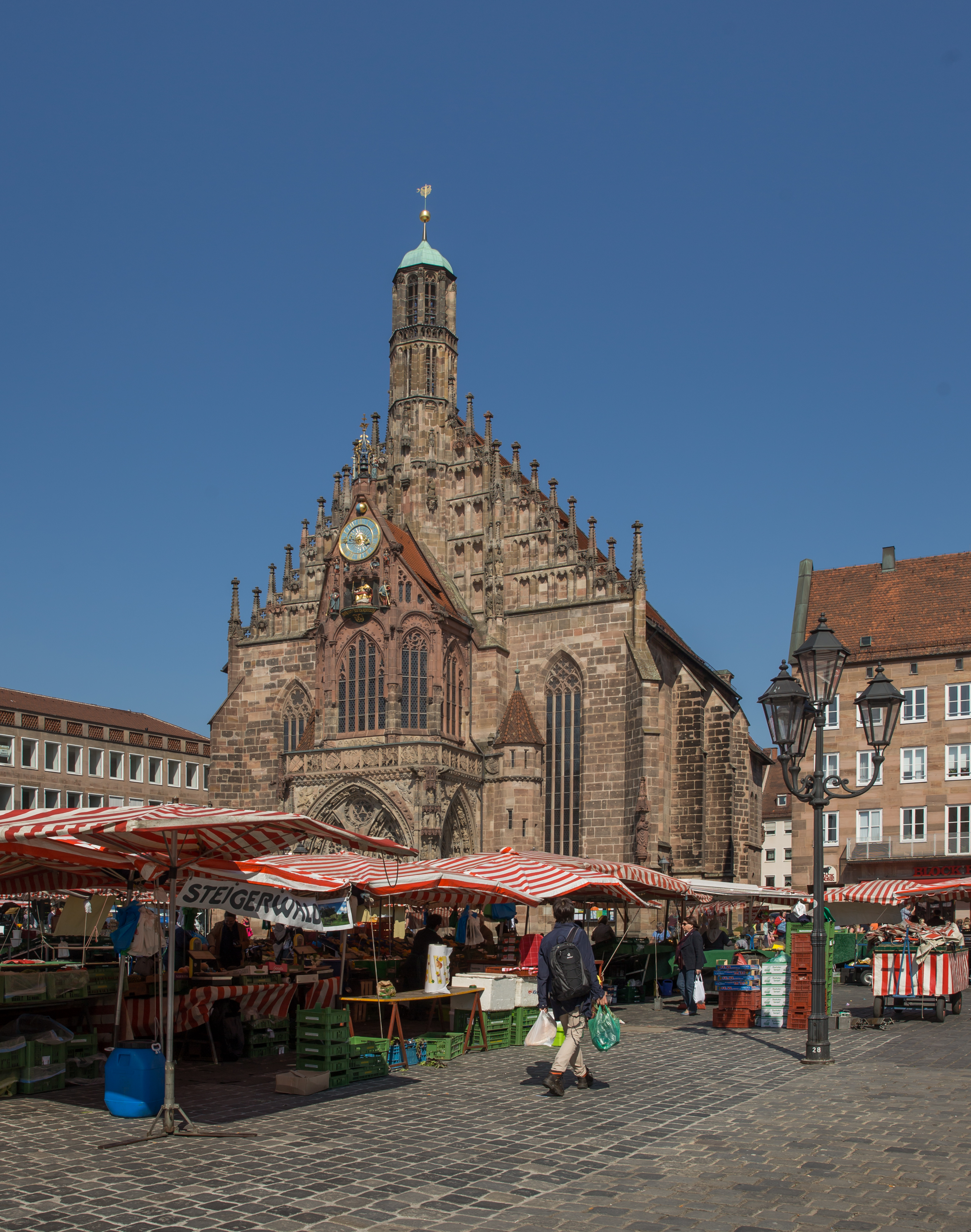
Western facade with the main market

== Bibliography ==
Note

This article is based on the article on German Wikipedia.

- Biddick, Kathleen (2013). The Typological Imaginary: Circumcision, Technology, History. Philadelphia: University of Pennsylvania Press. p. 160. ISBN 9780812201277.
