= John Sandeman Allen =

John Sandeman Allen may refer to:

- Sir John Sandeman Allen (Liverpool West Derby MP) (1865–1935), British Conservative Member of Parliament for Liverpool West Derby 1924–1935
- John Sandeman Allen (Birkenhead West MP) (1892–1949), British Conservative Member of Parliament Birkenhead West 1931–1945

== See also ==
- John Allen (disambiguation)
