= Jon Allen =

Jonathan Allen (born 1995) is an American football player.

Jon or Jonathan Allen may also refer to:

- Jon Allen (actor) (born 1982), American voice actor
- Jon Allen (musician) (born 1977), English singer-songwriter
- Jon Allen (drummer), with the band Sadus
- Jonathan Allen (artist) (born 1966), artist and magician
- Jonathan Allen (journalist) (born 1975), American political journalist and pundit

== See also ==
- John Allen (disambiguation)
- Jonny Allan (born 1983), English footballer
