= Clemens Buscher =

German sculptor and wood carver (1855-1916)

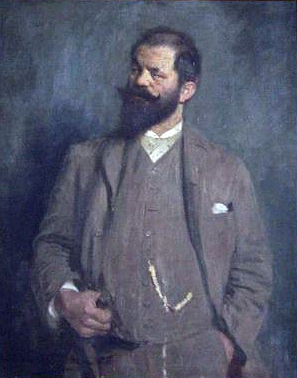
Clemens Buscher, by Wilhelm Schneider-Didam (1897)

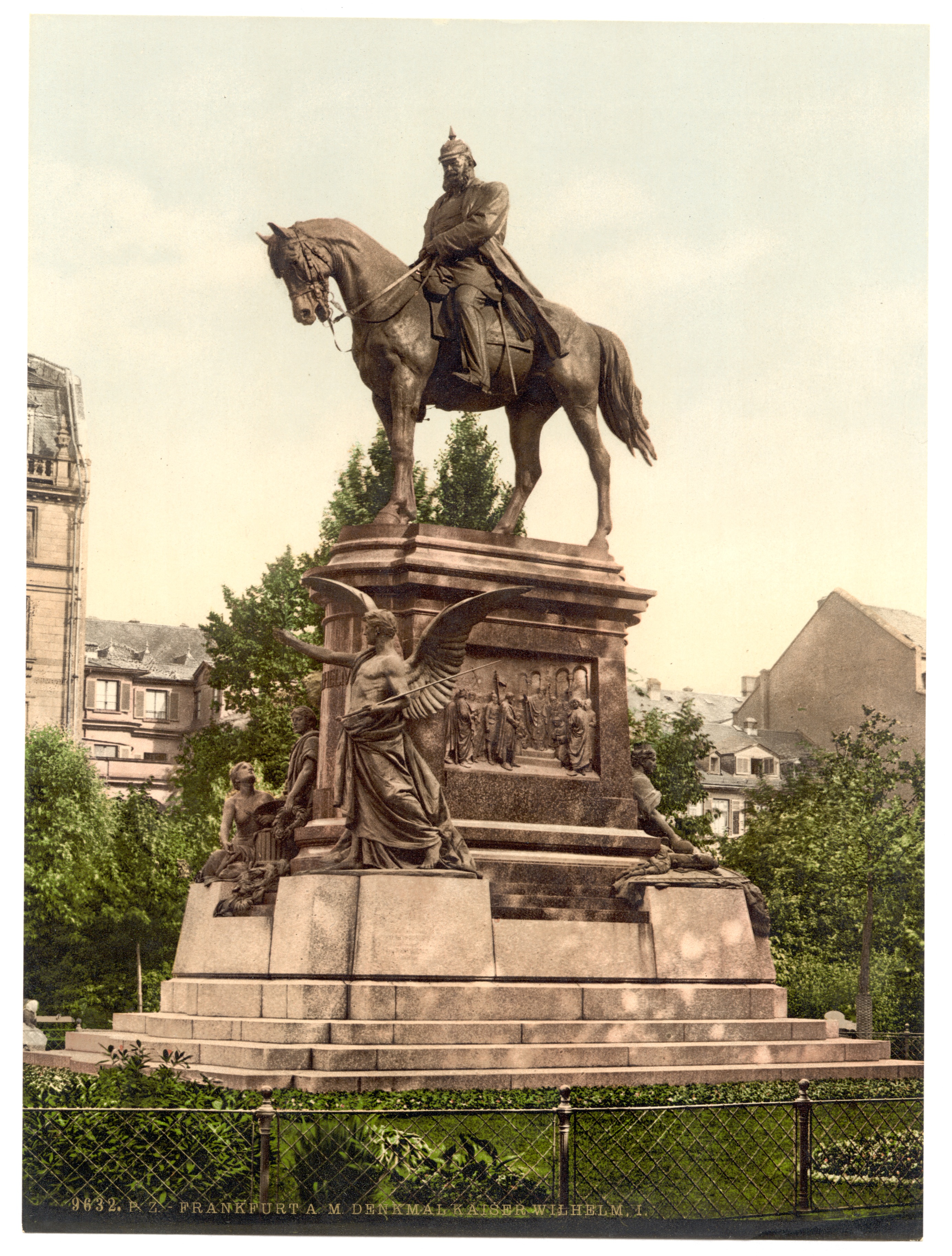
Kaiser Wilhelm I monument, Frankfurt am Main

Clemens Buscher (19 June 1855, Gamburg - 8 December 1916, Düsseldorf) was a German sculptor and wood carver.

== Biography ==
He was born to Friedrich Buscher, a stonemason, and his wife, Dorothea née Häfner. After completing elementary school, he worked in the family shop, which his eldest brother Karl (1844-1887) took over after their father's early death in 1866. He began a formal apprenticeship in 1872, with the sculptor Michael Arnold, in Bad Kissingen, and produced his first independent works in 1874. He then worked as an assistant in Konstanz.

In 1876, together with his older brother, Sebastian, he enrolled at the Academy of Fine Arts, Munich, where he studied sculpture with Joseph Knabl and Syrius Eberle. A year later, he received a medal from King Ludwig II and a scholarship for two years in Italy. After returning to Munich, he lived with the architect, Joseph Elsner, who helped support him and his younger brother, Thomas Buscher, who was also a sculptor.

He became a teacher of modeling, carving and drawing at the Kunstgewerbeschule Düsseldorf in 1883. He also joined several art associations, including Malkasten. Shortly after, he was named an Ehrenbürger (honorary citizen) in his hometown. In 1893, he married Theodora Budde (1866-1943); daughter of the painter Bernhard Budde. They had a daughter the following year.

He was promoted to Professor in 1898, for his monumental statue of Kaiser Wilhelm I in Frankfurt am Main. In 1902, he was forced to resign for health reasons, but continued to sculpt until his death. Due to his preference for bronze, and the fact that he had been largely forgotten, several of his works, including the statue of Wilhelm I, were melted down for war materiel during World War II.

In 2013, the family home in Gamburg was turned into a museum, honoring him and his brother Thomas.
