= John Allen =

John Allen may refer to:

== Academia ==
- John Allen (historian) (1771–1843), Scottish historian and political writer
- John Allen (bookseller) (1789–1829), English bookseller and antiquary
- John S. Allen (1907–1982), American university president

== Business and industry ==
- John Allen (miner) (1775–?), English lead miner aboard HMS Investigator
- John Allen (trade unionist) (1804–1888), Irish trade union leader
- John Allen (saloon keeper) (1823–1870), American saloon keeper and underworld figure in New York City

== Military ==
- John Allen (soldier) (1771–1813), American Army officer killed in the War of 1812
- John Melville Allen (c. 1798–1847), American soldier; philhellene; first mayor of Galveston, Texas
- John Allen (Irish nationalist) (c. 1780–1855), Irish nationalist and colonel in the French army
- John Allen (RAF officer) (1916–1940), British flying ace of the Second World War
- John R. Allen Jr. (born 1935), United States Air Force general
- John R. Allen (born 1953), United States Marine Corps general
- John J. Allen (general), United States Air Force general

== Politics and law ==
=== New Zealand ===
- John Southgate Allen (1883–1955), member of the New Zealand Legislative Council
- John Manchester Allen (1901–1941), politician
- John Allen (diplomat) (fl. 2009–2011), Administrator of Tokelau

=== United Kingdom ===
- John Allen, 1st Viscount Allen (1660–1726), Irish peer and politician
- John Allen, 3rd Viscount Allen (1713–1745), Irish peer and politician
- John Allen, 4th Viscount Allen (died 1753), Irish peer and politician
- John Hensleigh Allen (1769–1843), English politician; Member of Parliament for Pembroke
- Sir John Sandeman Allen (Liverpool West Derby MP) (1865–1935), British politician; Member of Parliament for Liverpool West Derby
- John Sandeman Allen (Birkenhead West MP) (1892–1949), British politician; Member of Parliament for Birkenhead West

=== United States ===
- John Allen (Connecticut politician) (1763–1812), U.S. Representative from Connecticut
- John J. Allen (judge) (1797–1871), American jurist and U.S. Representative from Virginia
- John W. Allen (1802–1887), American politician; mayor of Cleveland, Ohio
- John Kirby Allen (1810–1838), American politician in the Texas House of Representatives; founder of Houston
- John J. Allen (New York politician) (1842–1926), American politician in the New York State Assembly
- John Howard Allen (1845–1942), American politician; mayor of Orlando, Florida
- John B. Allen (1845–1903), American politician; first U.S. Senator from Washington
- John Mills Allen (1846–1917), U.S. Representative from Mississippi
- John Clayton Allen (1860–1939), U.S. Representative from Illinois
- John E. Allen (judge) (1873–1945), justice of the New Hampshire Supreme Court
- John J. Allen Jr. (1899–1995), U.S. Representative from California
- John Allen (Arizona politician), American politician and member of the Arizona House of Representatives
- John Allen (New Jersey politician), member of the New Jersey General Assembly

=== Other countries ===
- John Campbell Allen (1817–1898), Canadian justice of the colonial New Brunswick Supreme Court
- John J. Allen (Canadian politician) (1871–1935), mayor of Ottawa
- William John Allen, Canadian politician

== Religion ==
- John Allin (Puritan minister) (1596–1671), or Allen, English born Puritan cleric in Massachusetts
- John Allen (minister) (1741/2–1780s), English Baptist minister who supported the independence of America
- John Allen (religious writer) (1771–1839), English dissenting layman and religious writer
- John Allen (archdeacon of Chester) (died 1695)
- John Allen (archdeacon of Salop) (1810–1886), Welsh cleric
- John Allen (provost of Wakefield) (1932–2015), English Anglican Provost of Wakefield Cathedral
- John L. Allen Jr. (1965–2026), American religion journalist

== Science and medicine ==
- John Allen (engineer) (1928–2026), English engineer and plasma physicist
- John Allen (physician) (c. 1660–1741), English physician and inventor
- John F. Allen (biochemist) (born 1950), British biochemist
- John F. Allen (physicist) (Jack Allen, 1908–2001), Canadian physicist who worked on superfluid helium
- John P. Allen (born 1929), American ecologist and engineer; co-founder of the Biosphere 2 Center
- John R. L. Allen (1932–2020), British geologist
- John Romilly Allen (1847–1907), British archaeologist
- John T. Allen, Australian atmospheric scientist

== Sports ==
- John Allen (baseball) (1890–1967), American baseball player
- Hap Allen (John Francis Allen Jr., 1900–1988), American baseball player
- John Allen (athlete) (1926–2006), American Olympic athlete
- John Allen (rugby union) (1942–2022), English rugby union player
- John Allen (footballer, born 1955), English footballer
- John Allen (hurler) (born 1955), English hurling player and manager
- John Allen (footballer, born 1964), English footballer for Chester City and Mansfield Town
- John Allen (American football) (fl. 1970s), coach
- John Allen (sportsman, born 1974), Australian rugby union player and cricketer
- John Allen (basketball) (born 1982), American basketball player
- John Allen (American football coach, SAGU) (born c. 1962), American football coach (SAGU 1996–1997)

== Others ==
- John Allen (settler) (1806–1879), English settler in the colony of Van Diemen's Land (later Tasmania)
- John Allen (pioneer) (1796–1851), American pioneer and co-founder of Ann Arbor, Michigan
- John Allen, Welsh paedophile at the centre of the North Wales child abuse scandal
- John C. Allen (1907–1979), American roller coaster designer
- John Whitby Allen (1913–1973), American pioneering model railroader
- John Allen (murderer) (1934–2015), English criminal who murdered his wife and children
- John P. Allen (musician), Canadian country, rock and bluegrass fiddler
- John Allen (guitarist), member of the Nashville Teens

== See also ==
- Allen (surname)
- Jack Allen (disambiguation)
- John Allan (disambiguation)
- Johnny Allen (disambiguation)
- Jon Allen (disambiguation)
- John Alen (1476–1534), English priest and canon lawyer
- John Alleyn (disambiguation), including John Alleyne
- John Allin (1921–1998), American Episcopalian bishop
