= Rudolf Maison =

German sculptor

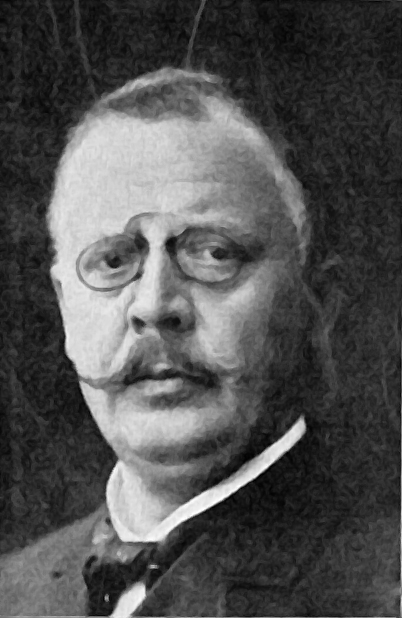

Rudolf Maison (July 29, 1854 – February 12, 1904) was a German sculptor born in Regensburg, Germany, where he began his studies. He continued studying in Munich. His work can be found all over Germany and is in the Romantic tradition.

Maison "often exaggerated to the most impossible degree the baroque frenzy of composition, disregard for the laws of equilibrium, and pictorial proclivities, but he broke sharply with his contemporaries habit of depending, for their forms, on the baroque of the past, and studied his own forms directly from actuality."

His style contained a "much more pronounced naturalism" than was to be found in the works of his German contemporaries and he thus, particularly in his smaller works was able to address themes that had "heretofore been deemed suitable only for painting" and "ruthlessly violated the tradition of pomposity and aloofness" current in German sculpture.

Much of his monumental work, including a Kaiser Frederick I in front of the Bode Museum and an Otto I and two mounted figures placed on the attic level on the Reichstag building have not survived the ravages that Berlin endured.

Maison died in Munich as was buried in the Westfriedhof cemetery there.
