= Joseph Elsner =

Joseph Elsner may refer to:

- Józef Elsner (1769–1854), composer
- Joseph Elsner (architect) (1845–1933), German architect
