= David Karoly =

Australian atmospheric scientist (born 1955)

David J. Karoly
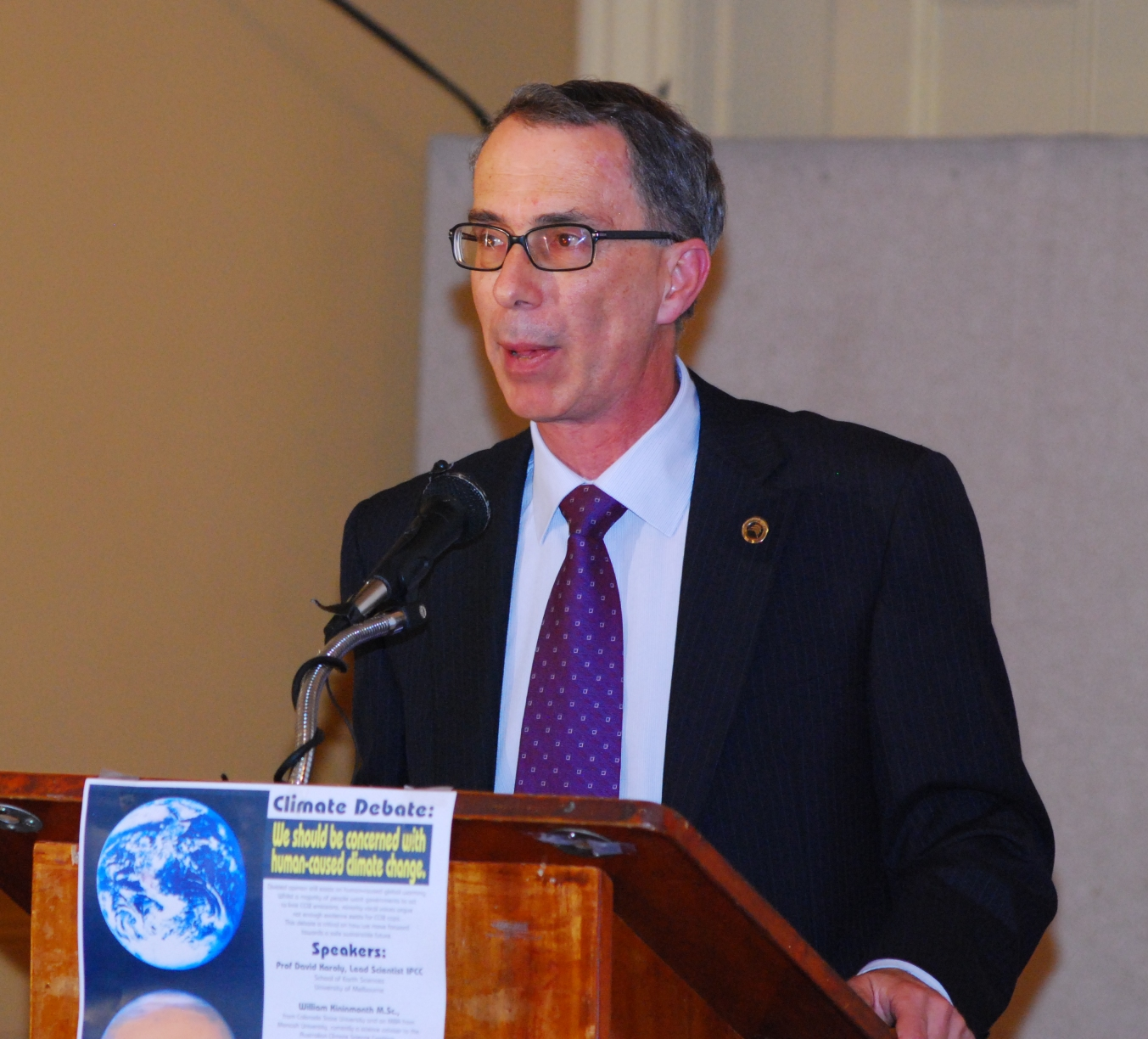
- Karoly speaking on climate change at Hawthorn, Australia
- Born: 1955 (age 70–71)
- Education: University of Melbourne; Monash University; University of Reading
- Known for: Climate change and climate patterns
- Scientific career
- Fields: Atmospheric sciences
- Workplaces: University of Melbourne, Monash University, University of Oklahoma
- Doctoral advisor: Brian J. Hoskins
- Doctoral students: John T. Allen

David John Karoly FAA (born 1955) is an Australian atmospheric scientist, currently based at CSIRO.

== Education and academic career ==
In the early 1970s David Karoly enrolled in applied mathematics at Monash University, Melbourne, but later became interested in meteorology. In 1980 he was awarded a doctorate in meteorology from the University of Reading in Reading, England.

After returning to Australia, from 1995 to 2000 Karoly became Director of the Cooperative Research Centre for Southern Hemisphere Meteorology at Monash University. Between 2003 and 2007 he was Professor of Meteorology in the School of Meteorology at the University of Oklahoma (OU). In May 2007 he joined the School of Earth Sciences at the University of Melbourne as a Federation Professor. In 2017 he became Leader of the Earth Systems and Climate Change Hub in the Australian Government's National Environmental Science Program.

== Contributions ==
He is an expert in climate change, stratospheric ozone depletion, and climate variations due to the El Niño-Southern Oscillation (ENSO).

Karoly has served as a lead author for the Intergovernmental Panel on Climate Change (IPCC) Working Group 2 (on societal impacts) and he is a member of the faculty of the School of Earth Sciences at the University of Melbourne. His work, along with that of the many other lead authors and review editors, contributed to the award of the 2007 Nobel Peace Prize, which was won jointly by the IPCC and Al Gore. He is member of the board of the Climate Change Authority.

== David Karoly as communicator ==
In the Australian scene, Karoly is credited with standing up to Alan Jones, a conservative and climate change denying Sydney radio commentator with the largest daily audience in that city of ca.150,000.

In doing so Karoly, originally a sceptic (1980), has earned the reputation of being a climate scientist communicator with the ability to explain the complexities of his research to the general public. On The Australian Broadcasting Corporation's high ranking television program Q&A wherein audience members can ask direct questions of experts, Karoly claimed his authority by stating in regard to his nemesis, "I am a climate scientist and Alan Jones is wrong."

Karoly pointed out that one hundred years ago carbon dioxide in the atmosphere was 280 parts per million whereas now it is 400 parts per million, an increase of 40% which he asserted was unquestionably caused by human activity. He also admonished Australians for producing 1.5% of the world's greenhouse gases when they were only 0.3% of the world's population.

On the population issue Karoly sounded a warning, saying, "climate scientists in Europe have said that the long-term sustainable population of people on the Earth is about 1 billion people in 2100 – not the foreshadowed United Nations population estimates of about 10 to 12 billion people. That’s not good news."
