= John T. Allen =

Australian atmospheric scientist

John Allen
- Education: University of Melbourne (Ph.D., 2012)
- Known for: Climate of severe storm and tornado environments
- Scientific career
- Fields: Atmospheric sciences
- Institutions: Central Michigan University International Research Institute for Climate and Society
- Thesis: The Impacts of Climate Variability and change on Severe Thunderstorm Environments in Australia (2012)
- Doctoral advisor: David J. Karoly
- Doctoral students: Maria Timmer

John Terrence Allen is an Australian atmospheric scientist and leading contributor to research on severe thunderstorm and tornado environments, particularly in the context of climate change, including seasonal prediction of hail and tornadoes. He is currently an assistant professor of meteorology at Central Michigan University. He was formerly a researcher at the International Research Institute for Climate and Society (IRI) at The Earth Institute (EI) of Columbia University.

He earned a Ph.D. from the University of Melbourne in 2012.

Other research interests include severe thunderstorm, hail, and tornado climatologies, tornadoes associated with tropical cyclones, social impacts of high-impact weather and climate, seasonal predictions, reanalysis studies, and evaluation of models and data sets. He signed, with Paul Markowski, Harold Brooks, et al., a prominent rebuttal to physicist Richard A. Muller's contention in a New York Times opinion piece that tornado activity in the U.S. had decreased and that the alleged decrease was tied to global warming.

Allen was born to Leon and Kerry Allen and grew up in suburban Sydney. In addition to his formal studies, Allen is a recreational storm chaser.

== See also ==
- Harold E. Brooks
- James Elsner
