= Bernile Nienau =

German draughtswoman

Rosa Bernile Nienau
- Bernile Nienau with Adolf Hitler, at Berghof, his home in the Bavarian Alps on 20 April 1933 (Note: The caption for the article printed in The Times of Israel stated that the photograph was taken in 1932. Within the body of the article as well as an article published by the Washington Post, the photograph was said to have been taken by Heinrich Hoffmann in 1933.) The photograph is inscribed by Hitler. (Note: The inscription in German reads: "The dear and [considerate?] Rosa Nienau Adolf Hitler Munich, the 16th June 1933") Nienau later pressed edelweiss flowers and a four-leaf clover onto the photograph.
- Born: Rosa Bernile Nienau; 20 April 1926; Dortmund, Germany
- Died: 5 October 1943 (aged 17); Munich, Germany
- Title: The Führer's child

Rosa Bernhardine "Bernile" Nienau (20 April 1926 – 5 October 1943) was a German girl who became known as "the Führer's child" because of her close friendship with Adolf Hitler that lasted for five years from 1933 to 1938.

== Life ==
Nienau was born on 20 April 1926, (Note: She is said to have been born in Dortmund, but a reliable source is required to add it to the article.) the daughter of Bernhard Nienau, a physician (1887–1926), and Karoline, a nurse (1892–1962). Her father died shortly before she was born. Nienau, her mother Karoline, and her maternal grandmother Ida (née Morgenstern) Voit (1867-1942) moved to Munich around 1928. Voit, a widow or divorcee, was a Roman Catholic teacher of Jewish descent.

Bernile was one-quarter Jewish, "mixed race of the second degree" according to the Nuremberg Laws of 1935. Though subject to some discrimination, she would have maintained her Reich citizenship.

=== Interaction with Hitler ===
In the spring of 1933, probably at the instigation of her mother, Bernile pressed to the forefront of the stream of visitors on Obersalzberg to grab Hitler's attention. Six-year-old Bernile’s bright blue eyes and blonde hair caught Hitler's attention and she was chosen to have a closer visit with the Führer. The fact that Bernile's maternal grandmother and mother were Jewish was already known to Hitler in 1933.

From that contact she and Hitler developed a "friendship" that lasted until 1938. They shared a birthday, the 20th April. Bernile often referred to him as "Uncle," and he would call her "sweetheart." In the Federal Archives in Berlin there are 17 letters that the girl wrote, probably with the help of her mother, between 18 January 1935 and 12 November 1939, to Hitler and his chief aide Wilhelm Brückner. An extract:

Munich, 27 September 1936.

Dear Uncle Brückner!

Today I have a lot to tell you. During the holidays we were on the Obersalzberg and I was twice allowed to see dear Uncle Hitler! Unfortunately, you have never been up. [...] I am already working on the Christmas work. [...] I am knitting Uncle Hitler some socks again, because I asked him if they fit him last year. He said yes! This year I can knit with finer wool, Mummy only helps me with the heel. They are going to be very warm, and since he always travels so much, it's important that his feet aren't cold. [...] Mummy also sends you greetings and many greetings and kisses from your Bernile!

On 19 April 1938, Hitler's adjutant Fritz Wiedemann described Hitler's disregard for her Jewish ancestry to subordinate party offices as "a purely human attitude toward the child". However, when Martin Bormann was informed of the lack of "German-bloodedness," the girl and her mother were forbidden to appear in the Berghof. Hitler only learned of it when his personal photographer Heinrich Hoffmann complained that Bormann had forbidden him to continue publishing photos showing the Führer with "his daughter." In his book "Hitler as I Saw Him," Hoffmann writes that Hitler said about Bormann: "There are people who have a positive genius for spoiling all my little pleasures." While Hoffmann's illustrated book Jugend um Hitler (Youth around Hitler), which included the photographs of Hitler with Bernile, continued to sell, Bormann forbade Hoffmann from printing any more pictures of Hitler and Bernile. Concerned with the perception of photos of the two because of Bernile’s Jewish ancestry, Bormann wanted all of Hoffmann’s books with her in them destroyed. In his 1955 book, Hitler Was My Friend, Hoffmann captions a picture of the two "Hitler’s Sweetheart--it delighted him to see her at the Berghof until some busybody found out she was not of pure Aryan descent," likely referring to Bormann. Around May 1938, Bernile's mother Karoline was officially asked to stop any contact with party leaders and visits to Hitler's home, the Berghof.

=== Death ===
Bernile, who learned the profession of a technical draftswoman, died on 5 October 1943 at age 17 in Schwabing Hospital of spinal poliomyelitis. Her grave is located in the Munich West Cemetery.
