= Philipp Hieronymus Brinckmann =

German painter (1709–1760)

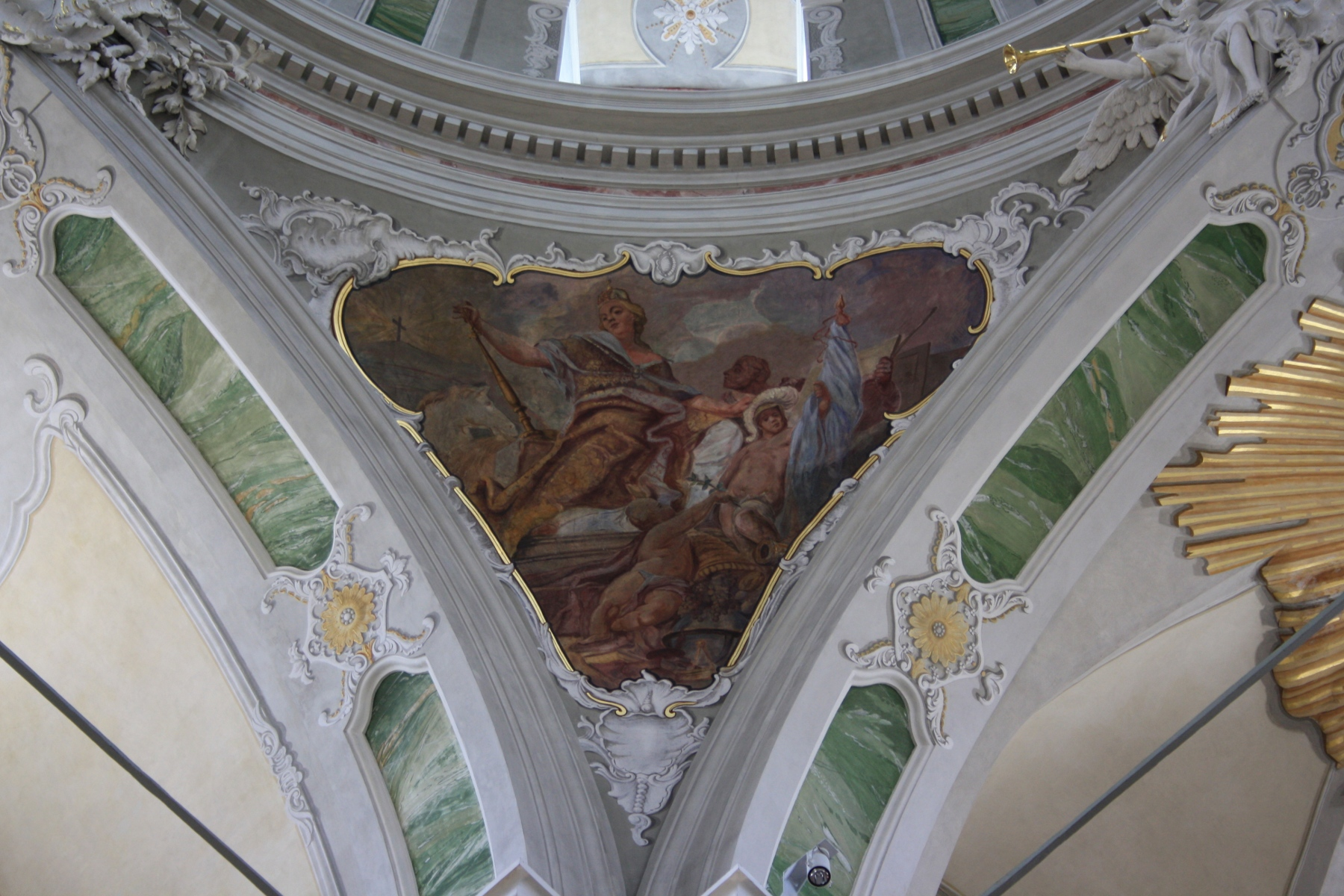
Mural painting in the Jesuit Church, Mannheim.

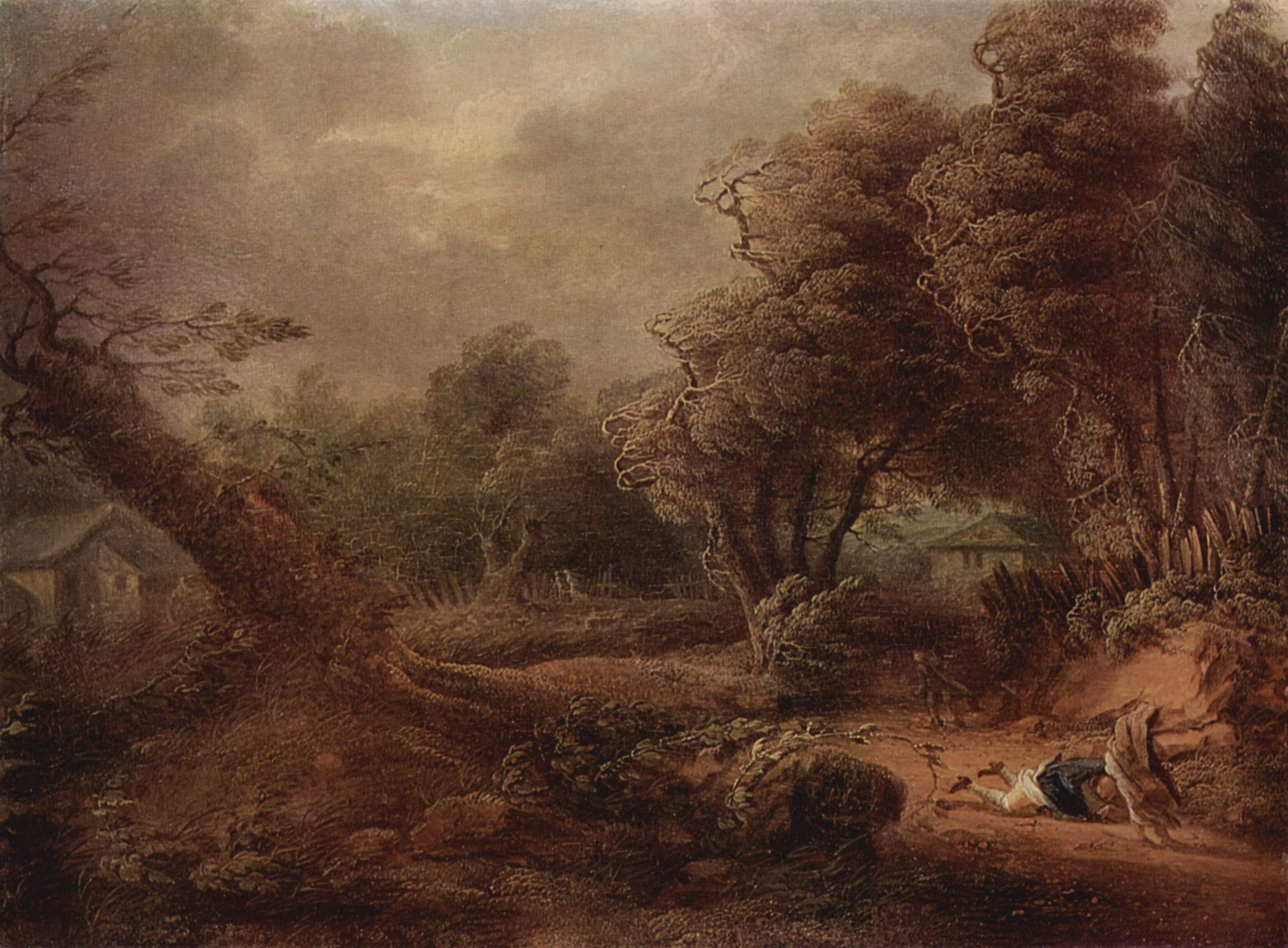
Landscape, ca. 1750, now at the Hermitage Museum in Saint Petersburg.

Philipp Hieronymus Brinckmann or Brinkman (1709 – 21 December 1760) was a German painter and engraver.

== Life ==
He was a student of Johann Georg Dathan in Speyer. In 1733, he was named a court painter by Elector Charles Philipp in Mannheim in the Electoral Palatinate. He was promoted to Director of the Malereikabinett (art advisors) in 1757. Later that same year, he became a member of the Geheimen Staatsrats (Secret Council of State).

As court painter, He was also involved in the Bibliothekskabinett (library advisors) of Electress Elisabeth Augusta at Mannheim Palace. At the Jesuit Church, he created frescoes and altarpieces.

As a landscape painter, he was influenced by the works of Salvator Rosa and Rembrandt. He received praise from Goethe in his book, Dichtung und Wahrheit.

== Etchings ==
He etched some plates in a picturesque and spirited style. The following are his principal prints:

- Philipp Hieronymus Brinkman; se ipse fec.
- David with the Head of Goliath. 1741.
- The Death of Pyramus.
- The Repose in Egypt; Rembrandt inv.; Brinkman fec.
- The Resurrection of Lazarus; Brinkman fec.
- Mary Magdalene at the Feet of our Saviour.
- Christ and the Samaritan Woman.
- The Presentation in the Temple; P. J. Brinkman inv. et fec.
- Six pleasing Landscapes; Ph. Brink. del. et fec.

== Sources ==
- Wilhelm Schmidt (1876). "Brinckmann, Philipp Hieronymus" . Allgemeine Deutsche Biographie (in German). Vol. 3. Leipzig: Duncker & Humblot. pp. 333–334.
- Gustav Jacob: "Philipp Hieronymus Brinckmann Ein Mannheimer Maler des 18. Jahrhunderts," in Mannheimer Geschichtsblätter. 23 (1922), Nr. 9., Sp. 172–178 : Ill
- Ernst Emmerling: "Philipp Hieronymus Brinckmann als Landschaftsmaler," in Mitteilungen des Historischen Vereins der Pfalz, 58, Speyer 1960, pp. 317–325
