= Thomas Buscher =

German sculptor and wood carver (1860-1937)

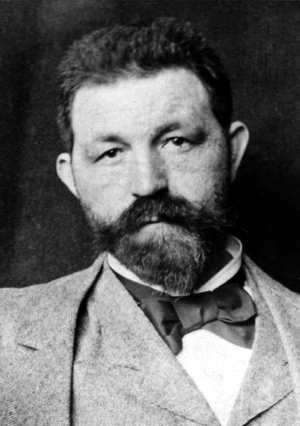
Thomas Buscher (before 1910)

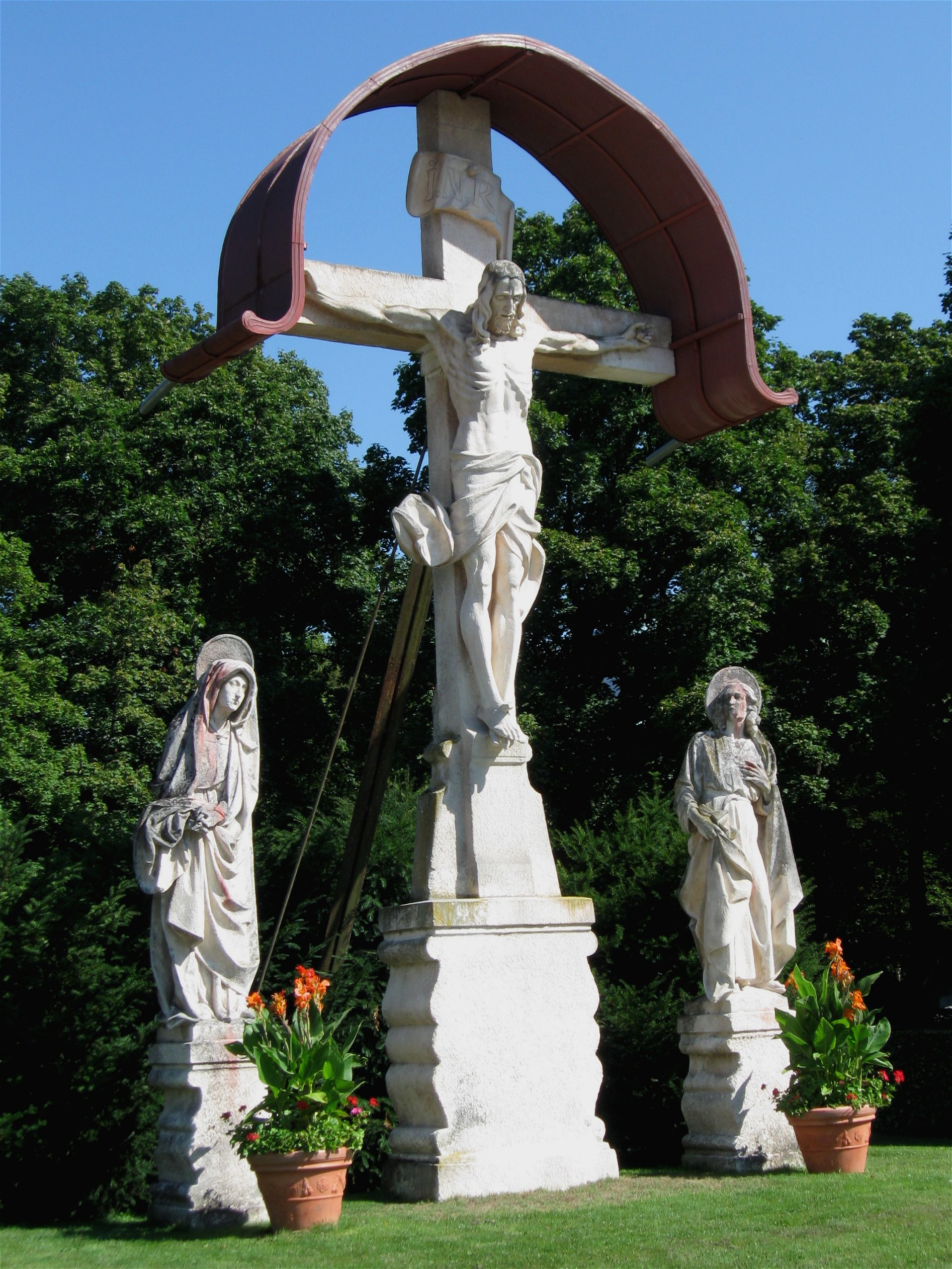
Crucifixion group, Westfriedhof (Munich)

Thomas Buscher (7 March 1860, Gamburg - 13 May 1937, Münsing) was a German sculptor and wood carver.

== Life and work ==
He was born to Friedrich Buscher, a stonemason, and his wife, Dorothea née Häfner. He was only six when his father died, and his eldest brother, Karl (1844–1887) took over the family business. In 1876, his brothers Clemens and Sebastian left home to study at the Academy of Fine Arts, Munich. Later that year, thanks to their efforts, he obtained an apprenticeship with the church Architect, Joseph Elsner.

In 1880, he also attended the Academy; studying with the sculptor, Joseph Knabl. After completing his studies, in 1884, he went to Chicago, to work as an ornament carver for Sebastian, who had emigrated there in 1879 to take over the workshop belonging to their uncle, Franz Anton Buscher, who had died. He returned to Munich in 1886, where he did some work for Elsner, but was mostly a freelancer. Two years later, he started his own woodcarving and finishing business. In 1890, he married Creszentia Maria Mamhofer, the daughter of a wood merchant.

From 1891, together with the sculptor, Balthasar Schmitt, he operated a studio on the Karlstraße. He also taught at a local crafts school. In 1900, he bought a home on Nymphenburger Straße, which also served as a studio for his religious art. He received Bavarian citizenship in 1907 and, in 1913, was named a Royal Bavarian Professor at the Academy, without teaching obligations.

He specialized in sculptures for churches, but also accepted commissions for grave monuments and war memorials. His works were mostly in the Neo-Gothic and Neo-Baroque styles. Despite the high quality of his works, many fell victim to the "purification" movement that followed the Second Vatican Council. Some, especially in rural churches, have since been restored.

In 2013, the family home in Gamburg was turned into a museum, honoring him and his brother Clemens.

== Sources ==
- Ehrentraut Bohnengel: "Thomas Buschers Werke in Großheubach", In: Spessart, monthly magazine of the Kulturlandschaft Spessart, July 2010
- "Buscher, Thomas", In: Hans Vollmer (Ed.): Allgemeines Lexikon der bildenden Künstler des XX. Jahrhunderts, Vol.1: A–D. E. A. Seemann, Leipzig 1953, pg.557
- Charlotte Baumann-Hendriks, Adelheid Waschka: "Thomas Buscher (1860–1937). Bayerischer Realismus zwischen Neogotik & Neobarock", exhibition catalog, Hallstadt 2007 (Online)
- Heinz Bischof: Chronik der Buscher-Brüder. Ein vergessenes deutsches Künstler-Schicksal. Fränkische Nachrichten, Tauberbischofsheim 1988, ISBN 3-924780-13-7
- Helmuth Lauf: "Auf den Spuren der Gamburger Bildhauerfamilie Buscher", In: Frankenland, ISSN 0015-9905, 33, 1981, pp.169–172
- Martin Seidel: "Buscher, Thomas". In: Allgemeines Künstlerlexikon. Die Bildenden Künstler aller Zeiten und Völker (AKL). Vol.15, Saur, 1996, ISBN 3-598-22755-8, pp.314 f.
