= Westfriedhof (Munich) =

Cemetery in Munich, Germany

Coordinates: 48.171°N 11.522°E

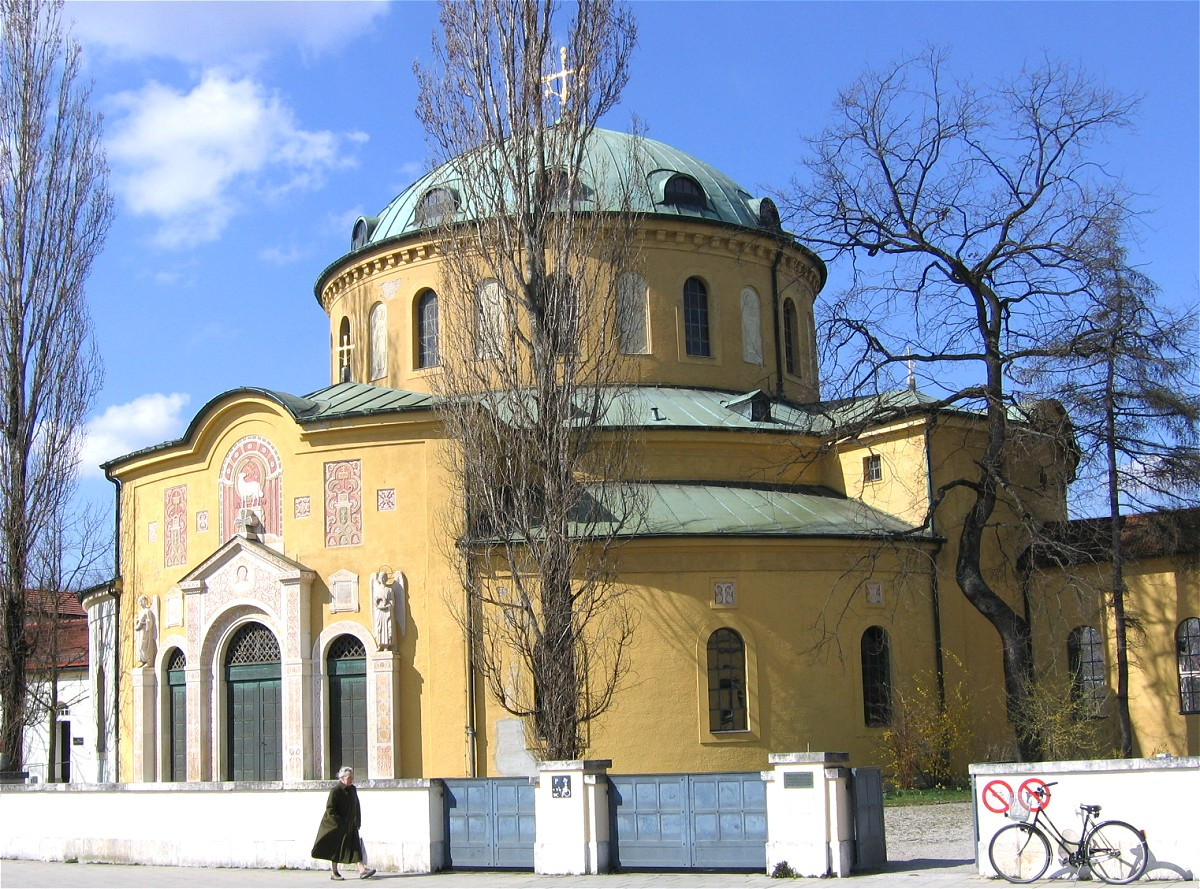
Westfriedhof, east side

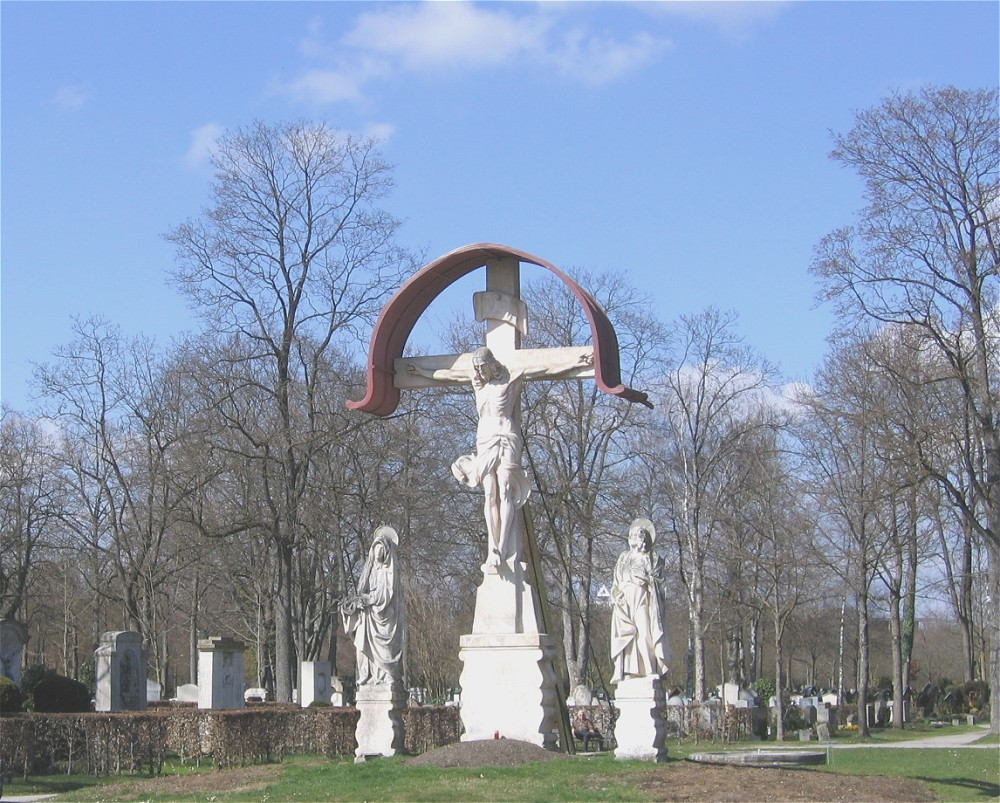
Crucifixion group by Thomas Buscher

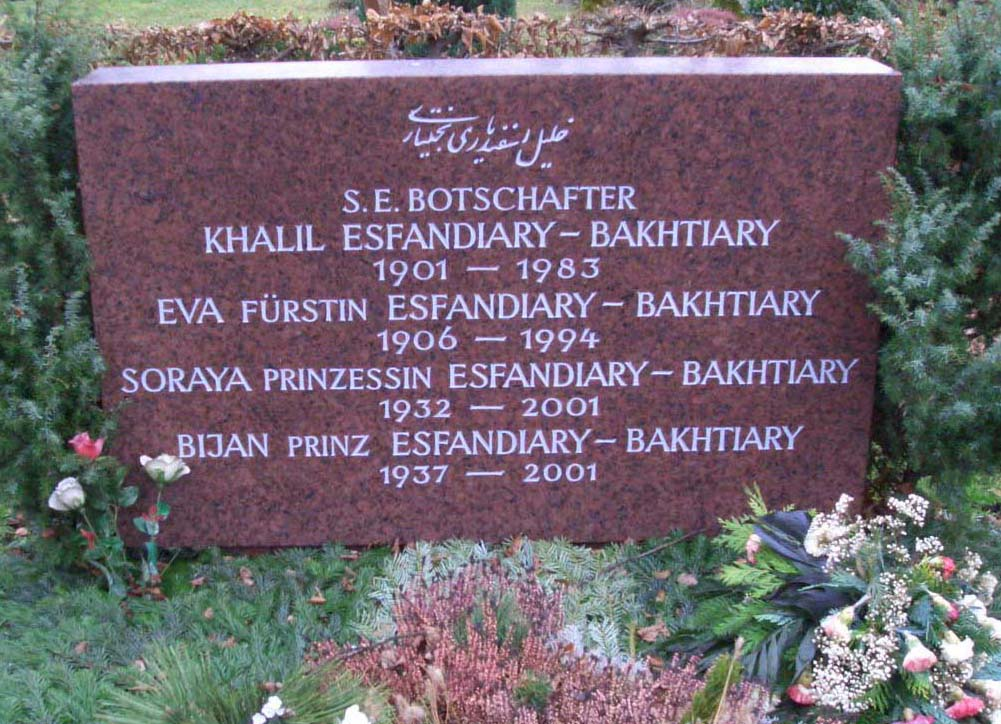
Grave of Princess Soraya and the Esfandiary family

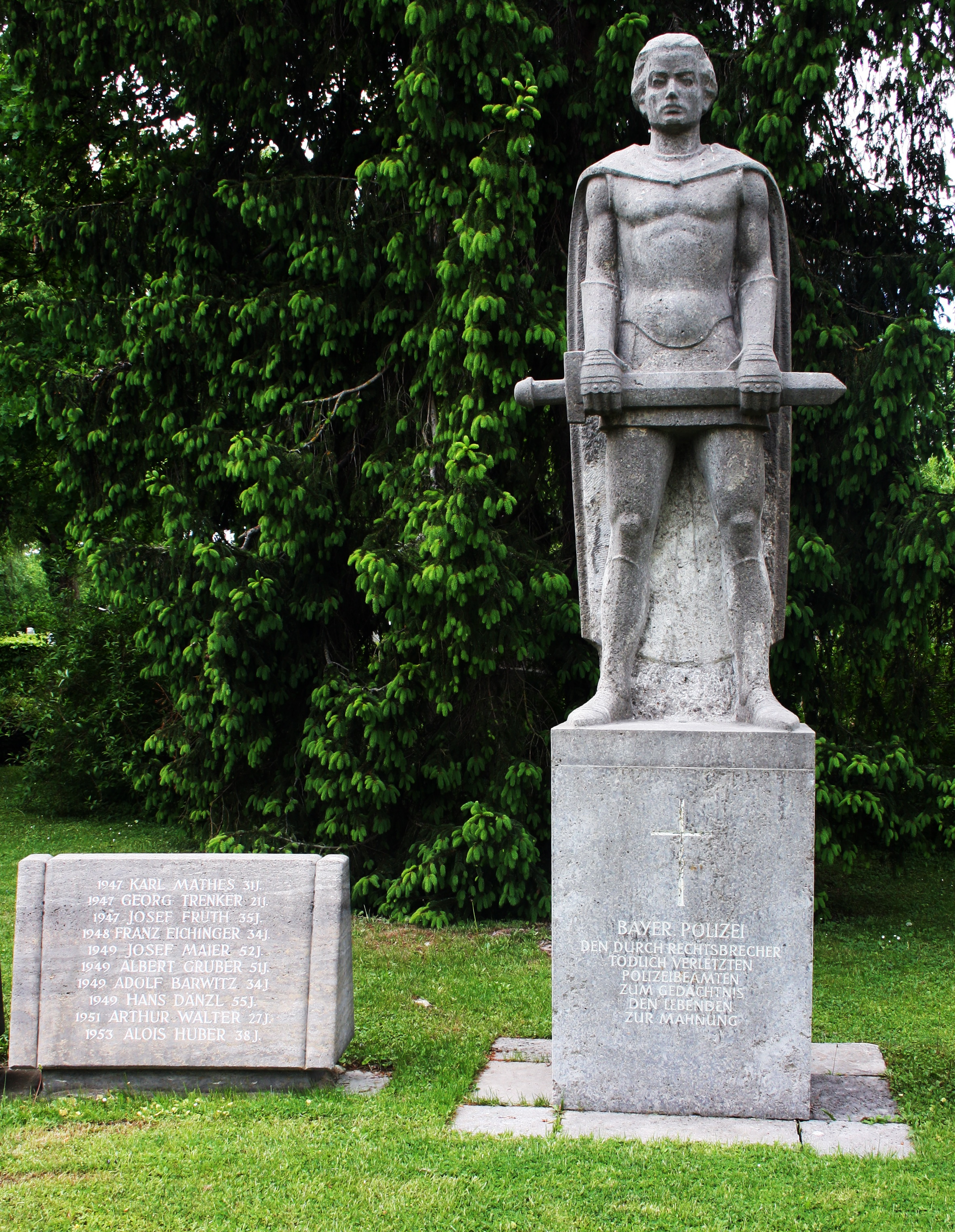
Monument to officers of the Bavarian Police killed in the line of duty

The Westfriedhof (West Cemetery) in Munich is situated in the south of the city district of Moosach. The main entrance is at Baldurstraße 28. The cemetery was laid out in 1898; the buildings, by the architect Hans Grässel, were completed in 1902. The Westfriedhof contains over 40,000 grave plots. The monuments in the principal avenue, many of them by the Munich sculptor Heinrich Waderé, are especially imposing.

== Graves of notable individuals ==
- Alexandra (stage name of Doris Nefedov) (1942–1969), singer (Zigeunerjunge)
- Hans Baur (1897–1993), chief pilot of Adolf Hitler
- Ursula Herking (1912–1974), actress and cabaret artist (grave levelled)
- Michael Hinz (1939–2008), theatre and film actor
- Robert Lembke (1913–1989), journalist and quizmaster
- Franz von Lenbach (1836–1904), artist
- Rudolf Maison (1854–1904), sculptor
- Edmund Nick (1891–1974), composer
- Bernile Nienau (1926-1943), Jewish child who became friends with Adolf Hitler on her 7th birthday
- Alexander Pfänder (1870–1941), philosopher
- Hans Schuberth (1897–1976), Bundesminister for posts and telecommunications
- Hanns Seidel (1901–1961), Minister-President of Bavaria
- Princess Soraya (Soraya Esfandiary-Bakhtiari) (1932–2001), former wife of the Shah of Iran
- Günther Storck (1938–1993), priest, bishop sede vacante
- Wolfgang Unzicker (1925–2006), chess grand master
- Max Valier (1895–1930), rocket pioneer, author of science fiction novels
- Karl Schmitt-Walter (1900–1985), opera and lieder singer
- Ernst Julius Röhm (1887-1934) close friend and early ally of Adolf Hitler, co-founder and leader of the Sturmabteilung (SA), the Nazi Party's original paramilitary wing

Two graves recall the terror of the period of the Bavarian Soviet Republic. Countess Hella von Westarp (1887–1919; grave 9-6-12), secretary of the Thule Society, was shot in the hostage murders. The other gravestone is known as the "Pals' Grave" (Gesellengrab) and commemorates 22 young men, members of the Roman Catholic St. Joseph's Social Club (Gesellenverein St. Joseph) who in May 1919 were drinking in their local and thus missed the curfew. They were apprehended by a Berlin regiment, who took them for Spartacists. The young men were unable to convince their captors otherwise, it was popularly believed because of the difficulties of mutual understanding between Bavarians and Prussians, and all were shot.

== Literature ==
- Erich Scheibmayr (self-published, Munich):
  - Letzte Heimat, 1985
  - Wer? Wann? Wo? (3 parts), 1989, 1997, 2002
