= St. Elizabeth, Nuremberg =

Parish church in Nuremberg in southern Germany

Coordinates: 49°26′58″N 11°04′11″E

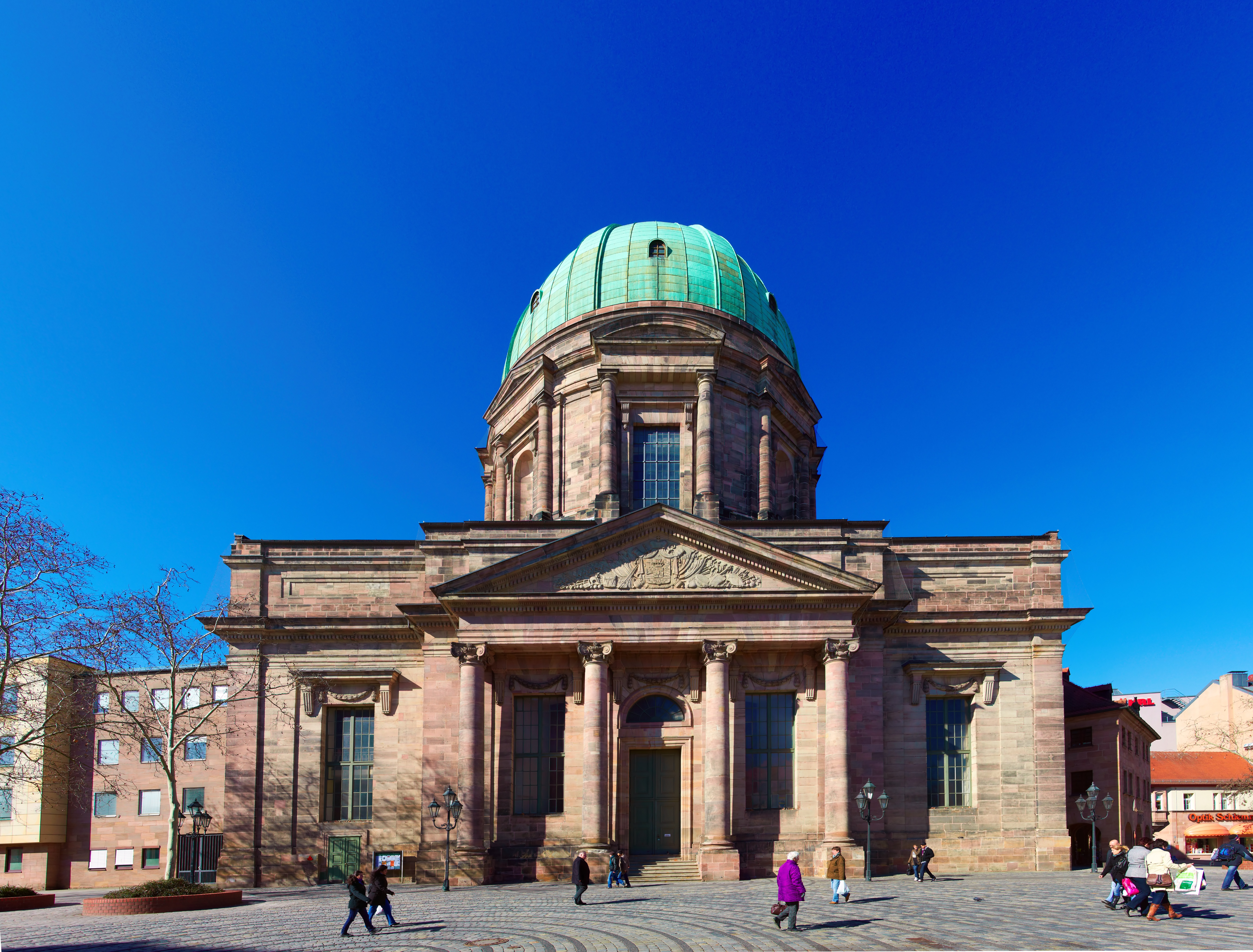
Front

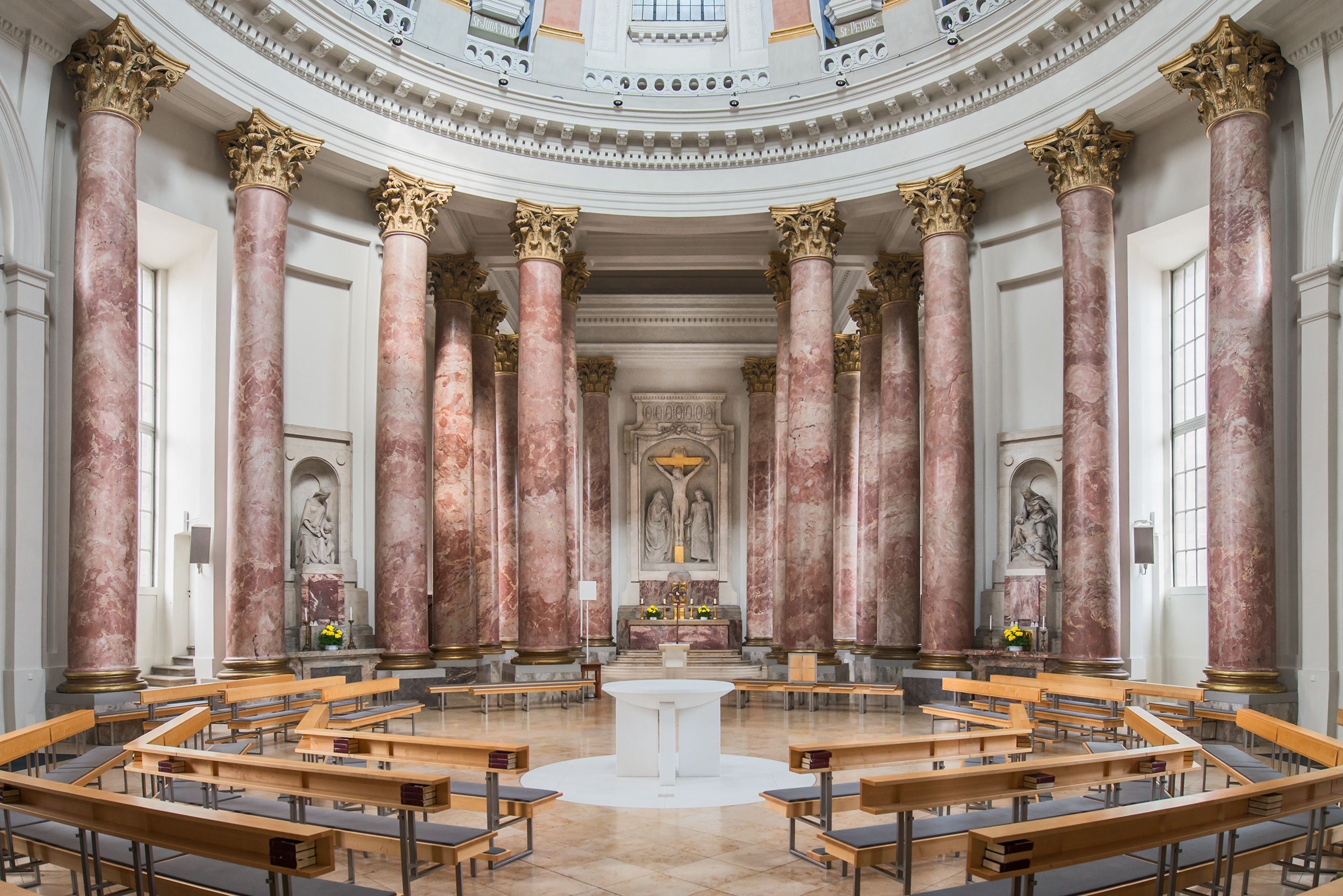
Altar

St. Elizabeth's is a Roman Catholic church in Nuremberg in southern Germany. It is dedicated to Elizabeth of Hungary.

== History ==
A chapel in the free imperial city of Nuremberg was dedicated to Elizabeth of Hungary in 1235. After the Reformation, this was the only Roman Catholic church in the otherwise Protestant city. It soon became inadequate for its congregation, and Catholic officials entered into protracted negotiations with the city magistrates, which lasted from 1718 to 1780, when agreement was reached that allowed for the construction of a new church building on the site.

The old church building was demolished in 1784. Franz Ignaz Michael Neumann, son of Balthasar Neumann, drew up plans for the new building and its foundation stone was laid on 19 May 1785. Neumann died on 29 September 1789, and his responsibilities were taken up by Peter Anton von Verschaffelt, who resigned in 1789 because his spending was exceeding the budget. The topping off was completed in 1802 and the dome was crowned with a golden cross in 1803.

In 1806 the church was secularised. On 27 January 1885, the Roman Catholic Archdiocese of Bamberg, whose territory includes the city of Nuremberg, purchased the building and by 1903 had completed the church to the original plans.
