= William Kyd =

English pirate

- Born: fl. 1400
- Died: 1453
- Piratical career
- Type: Pirate
- Years active: 1430s–1450s
- Rank: Captain
- Base of operations: Exmouth
- Commands: La Trinite

William Kyd (fl. 1430–1453) was a 15th-century English pirate active in South West England from the 1430s until the 1450s. Operating mainly out of Exmouth, Kyd was known for his command of the ship La Trinite and his involvement in extensive piracy along the English Channel and Atlantic coasts.

Kyd was part of a network of pirates, including John Mixtow, William Aleyn, and Clays Stephen, who benefited from the protection of corrupt customs officials, allowing them to operate with virtual impunity for more than two decades.

Historical records indicate Kyd engaged in piracy at a time when England was struggling to maintain control over its coastal waters amid political instability and frequent conflicts with France and other European powers.

Despite his notoriety, few details survive about Kyd's personal life, and his exact place of birth and death remain unknown. His career ended around 1453, possibly due to capture or death, though precise circumstances are not recorded.

== Biography ==
William Kyd first appears in a list of pirates published in 1431 as the master of the balinger La Trinite of Exmouth. The previous year, he and a number of other pirates active in the West Country seized a Breton ship off the coast of Guernsey. Two years later, he joined William Aleyn and several others in capturing four ships carrying provisions to Rouen.

In 1436, sailing into the harbour of Saint-Pol-de-Léon in Brittany with eight barges and balingers, he sailed off with the Seynt Nunne which was under safe-conduct by local authorities. He returned to Plymouth with the captured ship as well as goods belonging to a Thomas Horewoode valued at £100. Continuing his exploits during the next decade, one of Kyd's most notable accomplishments included the capture of the La Marie of London in 1448. Taking the Flanders-bound ship off the coast of Queenborough in the Thames, he quickly sailed the ship to the Isle of Wight where he sold his prize.

In November 1453, in perhaps the biggest prize of his career, he captured The Marie of St. Andrews. When he brought the ship back with him to Exmouth, his prize was noticed by a Scottish knight Sir William de Kanete (or Kennedy). Kanete left to see Thomas Gille (or Gylle), the controller of customs of Exeter and Dartmouth, and pretended to be the brother of the Bishop of St. Andrews and owner of The Marie. He and Gille then conspired to obtain a commission for the delivery of the ship in which Gille would get a share of the goods on board. Issuing a complaint with local authorities, a commission was granted to Sir William Bourghchier de FitzWaryn, Nicholas Aysheton, Sir Philip Courtenay, Sir John Denham, James Chudley, Nicholas Radford and Thomas Gylle on 3 July. Gille, along with James Chudley and Nicholas Radford, proceeded to Exeter where, after testimony by the mayor John Germyn and several others, they officially seized the ship "of Wm. Kenete de Scocia militis" on 10 August and delivered the goods on board to Kenete.
