= John Aleyn (disambiguation) =

John Aleyn (died 1373) was Canon of Windsor and Archdeacon of Suffolk.

John Aleyn may also refer to:

- John Aleyn (MP) (fl. 1337), Member of Parliament for Worcestershire
- John Aleyn (fl. 1646–1649), English law reporter; see Aleyn's Reports

== See also ==
- John Alleyne (disambiguation)
