= Elstner =

Elstner is a surname. Notable people with the surname include:

- Anne Elstner (1899–1981), American actress
- Frank Elstner (born 1942), German television presenter
- Milton C. Elstner (1848–1912), American lawyer and Civil War veteran
- Rudolf Elstner (1893–1966), German chess master
