= Peter Anton von Verschaffelt =

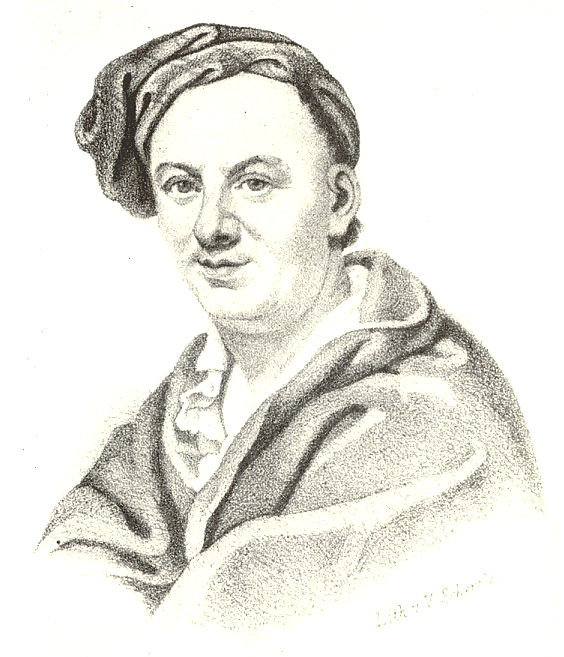
- Born: Pieter Antoon Verschaffelt; 8 May 1710; Ghent, Flanders, Spanish Netherlands
- Died: 5 July 1793 (aged 83); Mannheim, Electoral Palatinate, Holy Roman Empire
- Known for: Sculpture, Architecture

Peter Anton von Verschaffelt (8 May 1710 – 5 July 1793) was a Flemish sculptor and architect.

Verschaffelt designed, among other things in Mannheim, the high altar of the Jesuit church (Jesuitenkirche), the arsenal and the Bretzenheim Palace, as well as the church Wallfahrtskirche Mariä Himmelfahrt in Oggersheim (now part of Ludwigshafen).

== Life and work ==
Verschaffelt was born in Ghent, Flanders in the Spanish Netherlands, as Pieter Antoon Verschaffelt. After his apprentice years in Ghent in the workshop of his grandfather, Verschaffelt worked in Brussels, Paris and, from 1737 to 1751, in Rome. In 1748, he received the commission to replace the damaged statue of the archangel Michael on the Castel Sant'Angelo in Rome, although it was not installed until 1753.

In 1752 Verschaffelt moved to London. From there, he was appointed as a successor to the sculptor Paul Egell as court sculptor to Charles Theodore, Elector of the Palatinate, in Mannheim, Germany. Among his first tasks was the landscaping and statuary in the palace garden of Schwetzingen, for which he created the deer and the group of rivers, which are the key features of the park.

He died in Mannheim, Electoral Palatinate, Holy Roman Empire, aged 83.

== Gallery ==
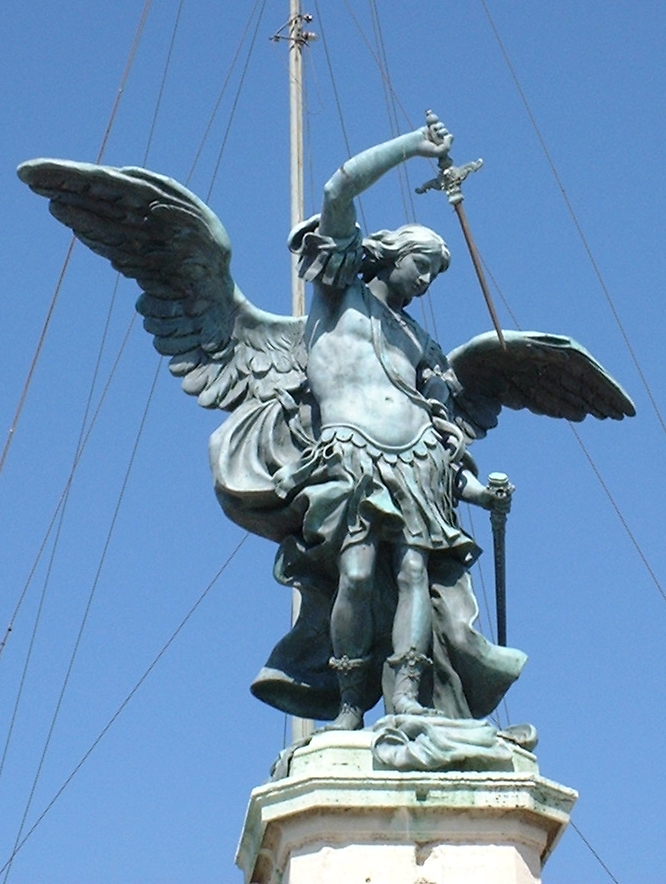
The bronze statue of Archangel Michael, standing on top of the Castel Sant'Angelo, Rome, modelled in 1753 by Peter Anton von Verschaffelt (1710–1793)

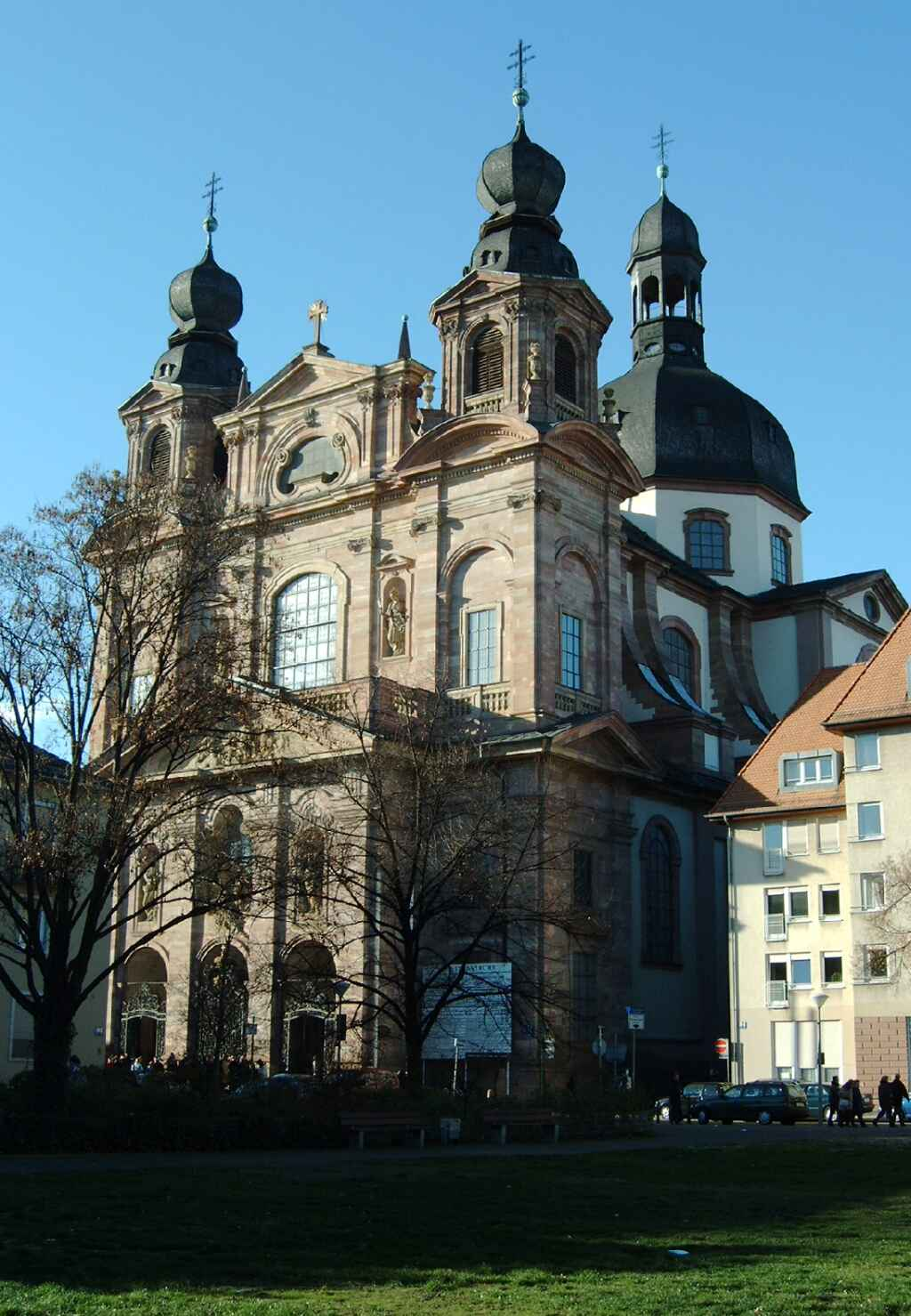
Jesuit Church, Mannheim

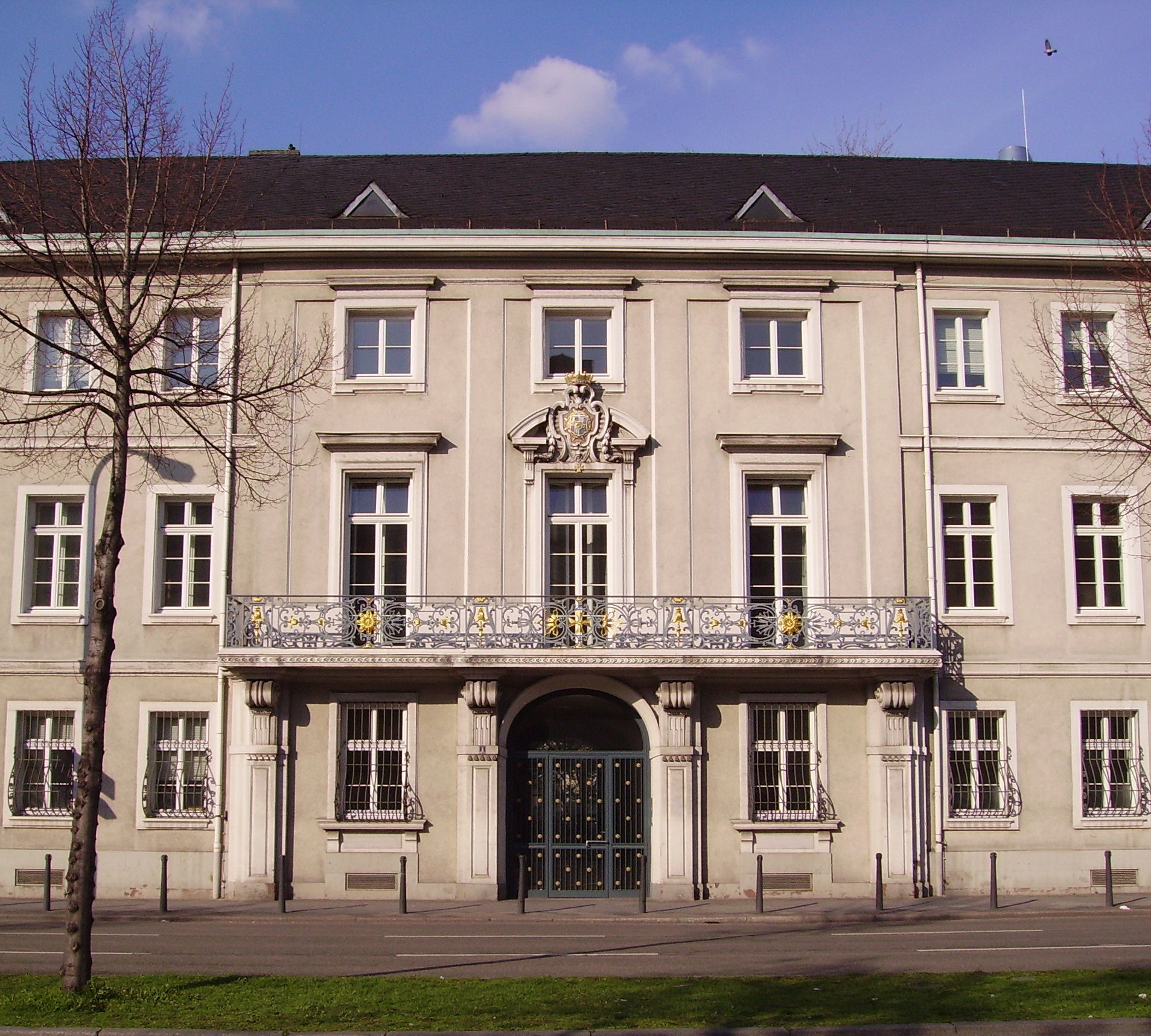
Bretzenheim Palace, Mannheim

== Sources ==
- Beisel, Edmund (1920) Ritter Peter Anton von Verschaffelt als Architekt Berlin
- Beringer, Joseph August (1902) Peter Anton von Verschaffelt. Sein Leben und Werk Strasbourg
