= John Alleyne =

John Alleyne or John Alleyn may refer to:

- Sir John Alleyne, 1st Baronet (1724–1801), Speaker of the House of Assembly of Barbados
- Sir John Alleyne, 3rd Baronet (1820–1912), British businessman and engineer
- John Alleyne (cricketer) (1908–1980), Australian cricketer
- John Alleyne (dancer) (born 1960), Canadian ballet dancer and choreographer
- John Alleyne (priest) (fl. 1466–1506), Dean of St Patrick's Cathedral, Dublin
- John Alleyn (barrister) (1621–1663), English barrister and MP
- John Alleyn (mercer) (died 1544), Lord Mayor of London
- John Alleyn (surgeon) (died 1686) English surgeon and schoolmaster
- John Alan, Alen, or Alleyn (c. 1500–1561) English government official in Ireland

== See also ==
- John Aleyn (disambiguation)
