= William Aleyn =

English pirate

- Born: fl. 1430
- Died: 1448
- Piratical career
- Type: Pirate
- Years active: 1430s-1450s
- Rank: Captain
- Base of operations: Southeast England

William Aleyn (fl. 1430–1448) was a 15th-century English pirate. During the 1430s and 1440s, he raided shipping throughout Southeast England and sometimes worked with William Kyd in the Thames and the English Channel. Like others of his trade, Aleyn operated freely and without interference from authorities while under the protection of corrupt custom officials.

== Biography ==
In 1431, Aleyn was listed as one of several pirates active in the area according to a public document published that year. He joined William Kyd and several others in capturing four ships carrying provisions bound for Rouen in 1433. Fifteen years later, he and Kyd began seizing ships in the assisted him in seizing ships in the Thames and carrying them down to the English Channel. He was particularly active near Thanet, although no more is heard of him after this time.
