= James Elsner =

American scientist

Jim Elsner
- Education: University of Wisconsin–Milwaukee (B.S., 1981; M.S., 1984; Ph.D., 1988)
- Known for: Statistics of tropical cyclones and tornadoes; climate change
- Children: Ian Elsner
- Scientific career
- Fields: Statistics, atmospheric sciences
- Workplaces: Florida State University
- Thesis: Analysis of wet season rainfall over the Nordeste of Brazil, South America (1988)

James Brian Elsner (born c. 1959) is an American atmospheric scientist, geographer, and applied statistician who has made substantial contributions to understanding of the spatial, temporal, and physical relationships of tropical cyclones and tornadoes, and the influence of climate change.

Elsner earned a B.S. (1981), M.S. (1984), and Ph.D. (1988) from the University of Wisconsin–Milwaukee (UWM). He joined the faculty of Florida State University (FSU) in 1990 as an assistant professor in the Department of Meteorology and moved to the Department of Geography in 1998 where he has held his current position as the Earl and Sophia Shaw Professor since 2008. He has been President of Climatek, Inc., since 2001. Elsner organized the biannual International Summit on Hurricanes and Climate Change in 2001 and the International Summit on Tornadoes and Climate Change, the first scientific conference on the topic, in 2014. He is a storm chaser and leads a FSU storm intercept program. He is member of the American Association of Geographers (AAG), the American Geophysical Union (AGU), and the American Meteorological Society (AMS).

== See also ==
- Harold E. Brooks
