= Jonny Allan =

English footballer (born 1983)

Personal information
- Full name: Jonathan Michael Allan
- Date of birth: 24 May 1983 (age 43)
- Place of birth: Penrith, England
- Height: 6 ft 0 in (1.83 m)
- Position: Striker

Youth career
- 1995–2000: Carlisle United

Senior career*
Years	Team	Apps	(Gls)
2000–2002	Carlisle United	29	(2)
2002–2003	Northwich Victoria	45	(12)
2003–2004	Halifax Town	14	(1)
2004–2010	Northwich Victoria	150	(55)
2010–2011	Gateshead	3	(0)
2011–2013	Harrogate Town	15	(4)
2013–2015	Celtic Nation	27	(9)
2016–	Carlisle City	3	(0)
- * Club domestic league appearances and goals as of 18:08, 3 March 2012 (UTC)

Jonathan Michael Allan (born 24 May 1983) is an English born footballer who is player/Assistant Manager at Carlisle City, who play in the North West Counties Football League.

== Career ==
Allan joined local side Carlisle United at the age of 12. He went on to play for the first team over 30 times and scored several goals helping the Cumbrians avoid relegation from the old Division Three. Allan moved to Northwich Victoriain 2002. Allan scored 75 goals in 220 appearances for Northwich.

Allan spent a brief period at Halifax Town at the end of the 2003–04 season before returning to Northwich.

Allan was Northwich's top goal scorer as they won the Conference North division in 2006. This culminated with two goals against Northwich's nearest challengers, Stafford Rangers, on the penultimate day of the 2005–06 season. The game saw Northwich clinch the league, witnessed by over 3,000 spectators (a new Conference North record). In the 2008–09 season, Allan was injured for much of the campaign but came back strongly and finished as the Vics' top scorer under the management team of Andy Preece and Andy Morrison.

With the uncertainty regarding Northwich's future during the summer of 2009 there was rumoured interest in Allan's services. However, he stayed at the club determined to overhaul the ten-point deduction the Vics faced for the Conference North campaign. After the season in which Vics finished 12th he sought a move away for the off-field problems at Northwich.

On 26 May 2010, Allan signed for Conference National side Gateshead on a one-year contract. Allan made his debut for Gateshead on 17 August 2010 as a late substitute away at Barrow. Allan made four appearances in all competitions for Gateshead during the 2010–11 season before his release on 4 May 2011.

On 25 May 2011, Conference North side Harrogate Town announced that they had signed Allan for the new season.

In May 2016 he joined local club Carlisle City as assistant manager for the upcoming North West Counties League First Division season.

== Career statistics ==
As of 30 April 2011

Club	Season	League^{[A]}		FA Cup		League Cup		Other^{[B]}		Total	
Club	Season	Apps	Goals	Apps	Goals	Apps	Goals	Apps	Goals	Apps	Goals
Carlisle United	2000–01	0	0	0	0	0	0	1	0	1	0
Carlisle United	2001–02	29	2	1	0	1	0	0	0	31	2
Carlisle United	Total	29	2	1	0	1	0	1	0	32	2
Northwich Victoria	2002–03	29	10	2	0	0	0	2	0	33	10
Northwich Victoria	2003–04	16	2	1	0	0	0	0	0	17	2
Halifax Town	2003–04	14	1	0	0	0	0	3	0	17	1
Northwich Victoria	2004–05	36	15	1	0	0	0	4	2	41	17
Northwich Victoria	2005–06	37	22	5	1	0	0	2	3	44	26
Northwich Victoria	2006–07	22	5	1	0	0	0	2	1	25	6
Northwich Victoria	2007–08	2	0	0	0	0	0	0	0	2	0
Northwich Victoria	2008–09	34	8	1	0	0	0	1	1	36	9
Northwich Victoria	2009–10	19	5	3	0	0	0	0	0	22	5
Northwich Victoria	Total	195	67	14	1	0	0	11	7	220	75
Gateshead	2010–11	3	0	0	0	0	0	1	0	4	0
Career totals		241	70	15	1	1	0	16	7	273	78

A. The "League" column constitutes appearances and goals (including those as a substitute) in The Football League and Football Conference.
B. The "Other" column constitutes appearances and goals (including those as a substitute) in the Football League Trophy, Conference League Cup, FA Trophy and play-offs.
