= Joseph Elsner (architect) =

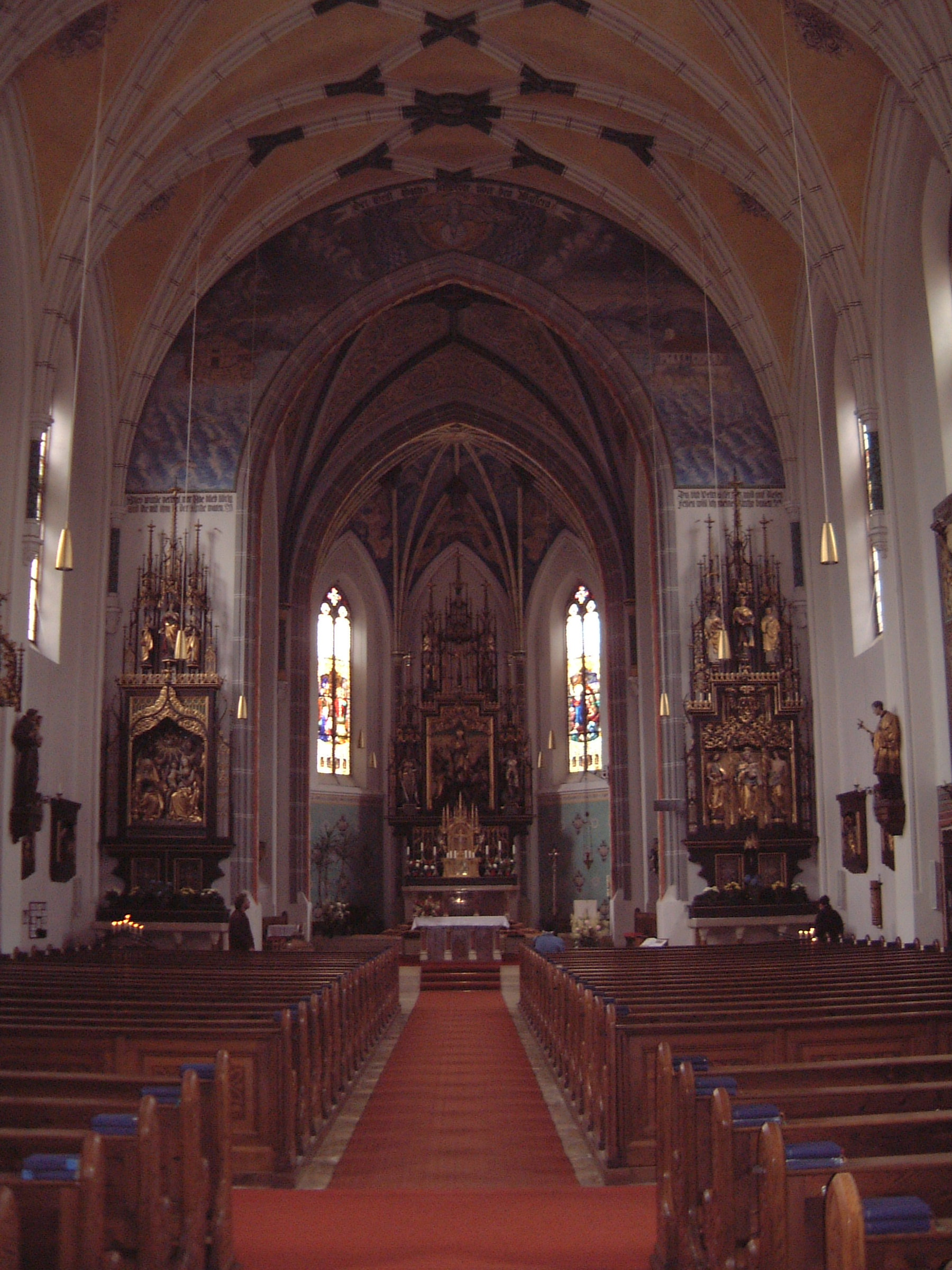
Interior of Catholic Church St. Nikolaus, Übersee am Chiemsee

Joseph Elsner (29 September 1845 in Schlaney, Silesia – 3 March 1933 in Munich) was a German architect and designer of Historicism (art).

Elsner's work focused mainly on the interior of Catholic churches in Munich, Bavaria, and in his home region, Silesia. His mentor was Johann Marggraff. In 1876 he married Walburga Hauser (1857–1924). They had 13 children, six of whom died as infants or toddlers.

His son, Joseph Elsner junior (1879–1970), was also an architect.

== Sources ==
- Hildegard Berning: Joseph Elsner (1845−1933). In: Joachim Bahlcke (Ed.): Schlesische Lebensbilder. Vol.9. Insingen 2007. ISBN 978-3-7686-3506-6, pp.293–304
- Verein für christliche Kunst in München: Festgabe zur Erinnerung an das 50jähr. Jubiläum. Lentner'sche Hofbuchhandlung, München 1910, pg.150
