= Robert Allan =

Robert Allan may refer to:

== Poetry ==
- Robert Allan (poet) (1774–1841), Scottish poet
- Rob Allan (1945–2021), New Zealand poet

== Politics ==
- Robert Allan, Baron Allan of Kilmahew (1914–1979), Conservative politician
- Robert George Allan (1879–1972), agricultural administrator in India
- Robert M. Allan (1880–1965), member of the City Council in Los Angeles, 1921–1927
- Robert Allan (trade unionist), leader of the Scottish Trades Union Congress

== Other ==
- Robert Allan (businessman) (1847–1927), manufacturer in Christchurch, New Zealand
- Robert Allan (footballer), goalkeeper for Sunderland A.F.C. (1907–08)
- Robert Allan (mineralogist) (1806–1863), fellow of the Royal Society of Edinburgh, fellow of the Geological Society
- Robert Allan Ltd., Canadian naval architectural firm
- Robert Weir Allan (1851–1942), Scottish-born painter
- Bob Allan (1872–1918), Scottish footballer

== See also ==
- Robert Allen (disambiguation)
