= William Allan of Glen =

Scottish merchant (1788–1868)

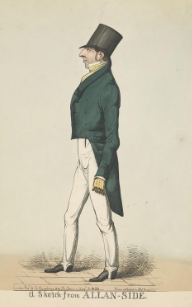
William Allan of Edinburgh c.1820

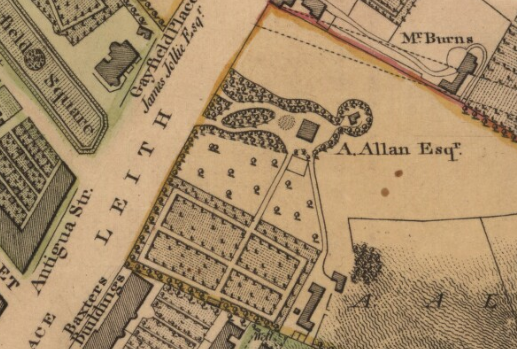
Detail of John Ainslie's map of Edinburgh, 1804, showing Alexander Allan's Hillside House

William Allan of Glen JP (1788–1868) was a 19th-century Scottish merchant who served as Lord Provost of Edinburgh from 1829 to 1831.

== Life ==
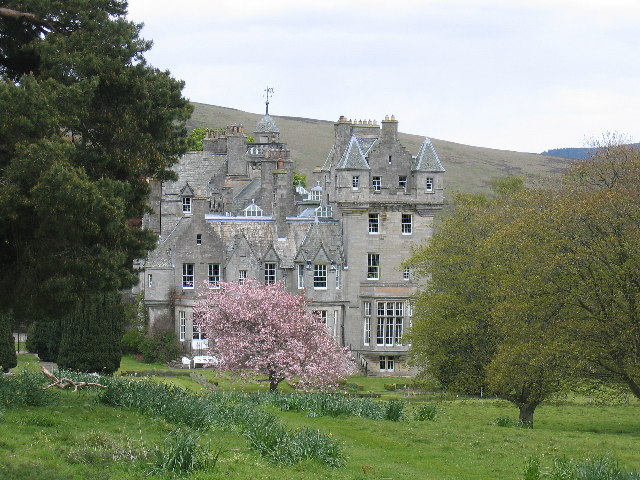
Glen House

He was born on 20 August 1788 at Hillside House in Edinburgh (at the top of Leith Walk), the son of Alexander Allan (1747-1825), a banker, and his wife Ann Losh. His father had purchased the Hillside estate, which included most of Calton Hill and the lands to the north, in 1785 from James Grant or John Plenderleith for £10,500. He also had a townhouse at 20 Charlotte Square and owned the huge 3500 acre Glen estate at Innerleithen. Hillside House stood east of Gayfield Square at the head of Leith Walk where Elm Row and Hillside street now stand. His father's bank was at 126 High Street on the Royal Mile.

He was baptised on 23 August at St Cuthbert's Church, Edinburgh by Rev William Moodie.

He was admitted into the trades incorporation as a guild brother in 1817 and made a burgess of the town at the same time. In 1820 he was living at 76 Queen Street, close to his father's townhouse at Charlotte Square.

In 1821 he commissioned William Henry Playfair to design a large extension to the New Town on the Hillside and Calton Hill lands. This included custom-designed houses for himself at 11 Hillside Crescent and his brothers Thomas at 4 Hillside Crescent and Alexander Allan (an advocate) at 5 Hillside Crescent. The scheme began on the ground in 1823. In 1826 he commissioned Playfair to also remodel the huge Glen House at Innerleithen. However, this proved a financial disaster and he was forced to sell the partially complete mansion to Charles Tennant for £33,000 who had funds enough to complete the work, but employing David Bryce to complete the scheme.

In 1829 he succeeded Walter Brown as Lord Provost of Edinburgh. He was succeeded in turn in 1831 by John Learmonth of Dean. The significant events/decisions during his term of office were the building of George IV Bridge and Dean Bridge and the macadamisation of The Mound.

In the 1850s he was trying to live within his means at Boulogne having not only sold the Glen estate but also his Edinburgh properties.

He retired to 7 Chichester Terrace in Brighton. He died on 6 July 1868 in Brighton and was buried there in St Wulfran's Church.

== Trivia ==
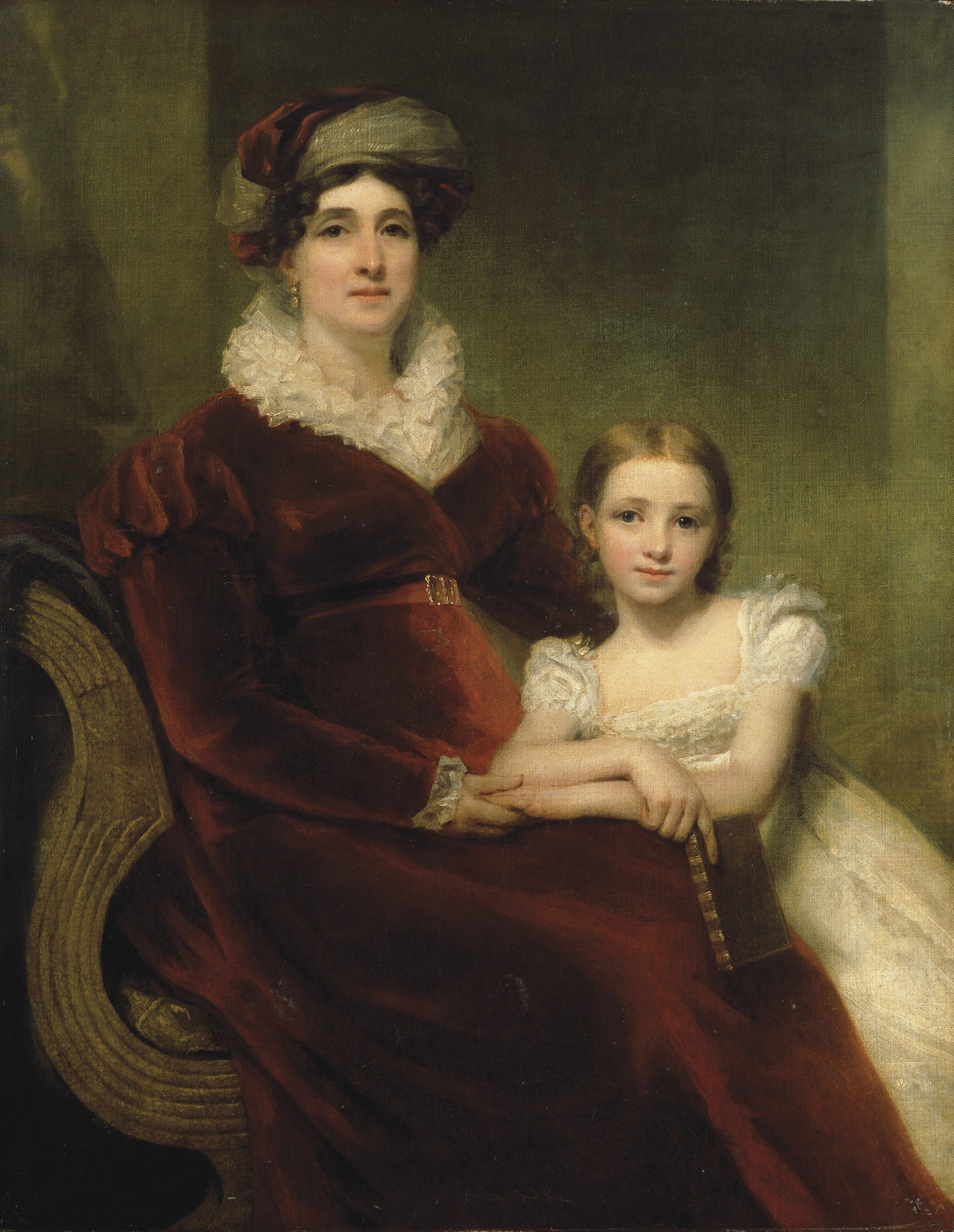
Henry Raeburn's portrait of Allan's mother and niece

His parents were painted with his niece Matilda by Sir Henry Raeburn.

His parents are buried in the family vault at Old Calton Burial Ground in central Edinburgh.

William was a member of the Royal Company of Archers, the King's official bodyguard in Scotland, and a member of the Pitt Club.

He was cousin to Thomas Allan whose descendants included Robert Allan and Robert George Allan.

== Family ==
In 1829 he married Elizabeth Gott (1794-1880), widow of Richard Wormald (who died in a fire).

They do not appear to have had any children.
