= Robert Allen =

Bob, Bobby, Robbie or Robert Allen may refer to:

== Composers ==
- Robert William Otto Allen (1852–1888), Danish pianist, composer and conductor
- Robert Allen (song composer) (1927–2000), American pianist and arranger

== Performers ==
- Robert Allen (actor) (1906–1998), American stage, film and television actor
- Robbie Allen (musician), American bassist and guitarist
- Robert Marlow (Robert Allen, 1961–2022), English singer and musician

== Politicians ==
- Robert Allen (Tennessee politician) (1778–1844), American congressperson
- Robert Allen (Virginia politician) (1794–1859), American congressperson
- Robert Allen (Irish politician), MP for Carysfort in County Wicklow
- Robert E. Lee Allen (1865–1951), American congressperson from West Virginia
- Robert Allen (Ontario politician) (1888–1969), Canadian member of Legislative Assembly of Ontario
- Robert G. Allen (1902–1963), American congressperson from Pennsylvania
- Robert E. Allen (politician) (1924–2014), American legislator in Colorado
- Bob Allen (Pennsylvania politician) (1945–2026), American state legislator
- Bob Allen (Florida politician) (born 1958), American state legislator

== Sportsmen ==
=== Baseball ===
- Bob Allen (shortstop) (1867–1943), American baseball player and manager
- Al Elliott (Robert Allen, 1894–1975), American football halfback and baseball center fielder
- Bob Allen (1930s pitcher) (1914–2005), American right-hander in National League, 1937
- Bob Allen (1960s pitcher) (1937–2023), American League left-hander, 1961–67
- Robbie Allen (baseball) (born 1959), American baseball player and coach

=== Basketball ===
- Bob Allen (basketball) (1946–2025), American power forward
- Bobby Allen (basketball) (born 1969), Canadian point and shooting guard

=== Football ===
- Bob Allen (Australian footballer) (1908–1992), player with Fitzroy in VFL
- Bob Allen (footballer, born 1916) (1916–1992), English winger
- Robert Allen (British Army officer) (1886–1981), English forward and British Army major-general

=== Other sports ===
- Bobby Allen (racing driver) (1943–2025), American racer of winged sprint cars
- Robert Allen (boxer) (born 1969), American middleweight
- Bobby Allen (ice hockey) (born 1978), American defenseman in NHL

== Writers ==
- Bob Allen (surgeon) (1772–1805), English journalist and surgeon
- Robert S. Allen (1900–1981), American investigative journalist
- Robert Porter Allen (1905–1963), American ornithologist and environmentalist
- Robert Thomas Allen (1911–1990), Canadian humorist
- Robert Livingston Allen (1916–1982), American educator and linguist
- Robert Allen (poet) (1920–2007), English author of 1994's Canny Bit Verse in Northumbrian dialect
- Robert L. Allen (1942–2024), American activist and academic
- Robert Allen (lexicographer) (born 1944), British lexicographer and author
- Bob Allen (economic historian) (born 1947), American professor of economic history at Oxford University

== Others ==
- Robert Allen (animator) (1909–2008), American animator and film director
- Robert Allen (criminal) (born 1996), American man convicted for the murder of XXXTentacion
- Robert Allen (general) (1811–1886), American Civil War Union general
- Robert Calder Allen (1812–1903), English naval captain
- Robert Allen (Baptist minister) (1847–1927), Welsh clergyman in Glamorganshire
- Robert E. Allen (telecommunications executive) (1935–2016), American CEO and chairman of AT&T
- Bobbie R. Allen (1922–1972), American aviator and government official
- Rob Allen (born 1955), Australian artist and designer

== See also ==
- Bobbie Allen (disambiguation)
- Robert Allan (disambiguation)
- Bert Allen (disambiguation)
