= Uist =

Archipelago in the Outer Hebrides, Scotland

Uibhist (Gaelic)
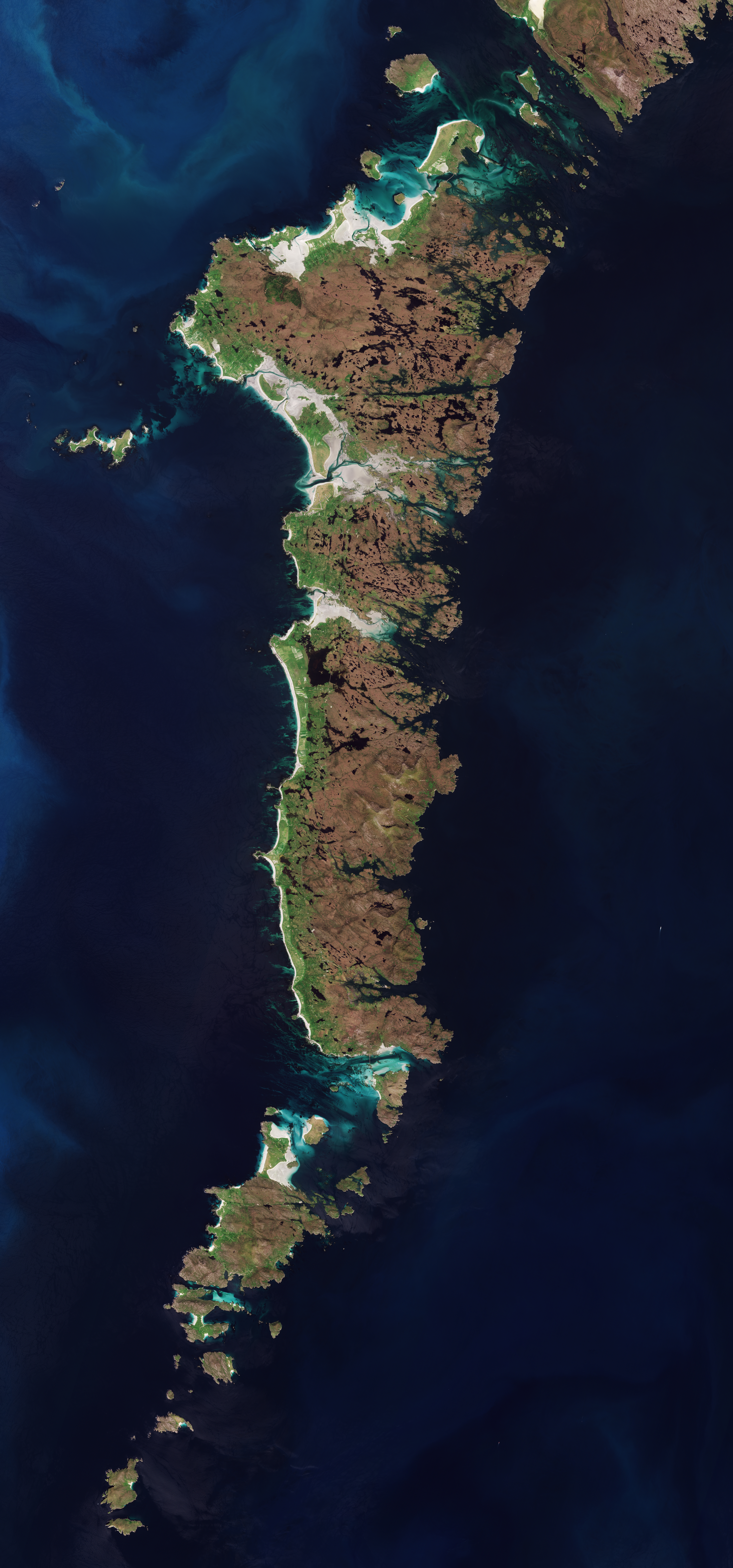
- Satellite image of the southern Outer Hebrides. Bridges and causeways link the Uist chain from Berneray to Eriskay.

Location
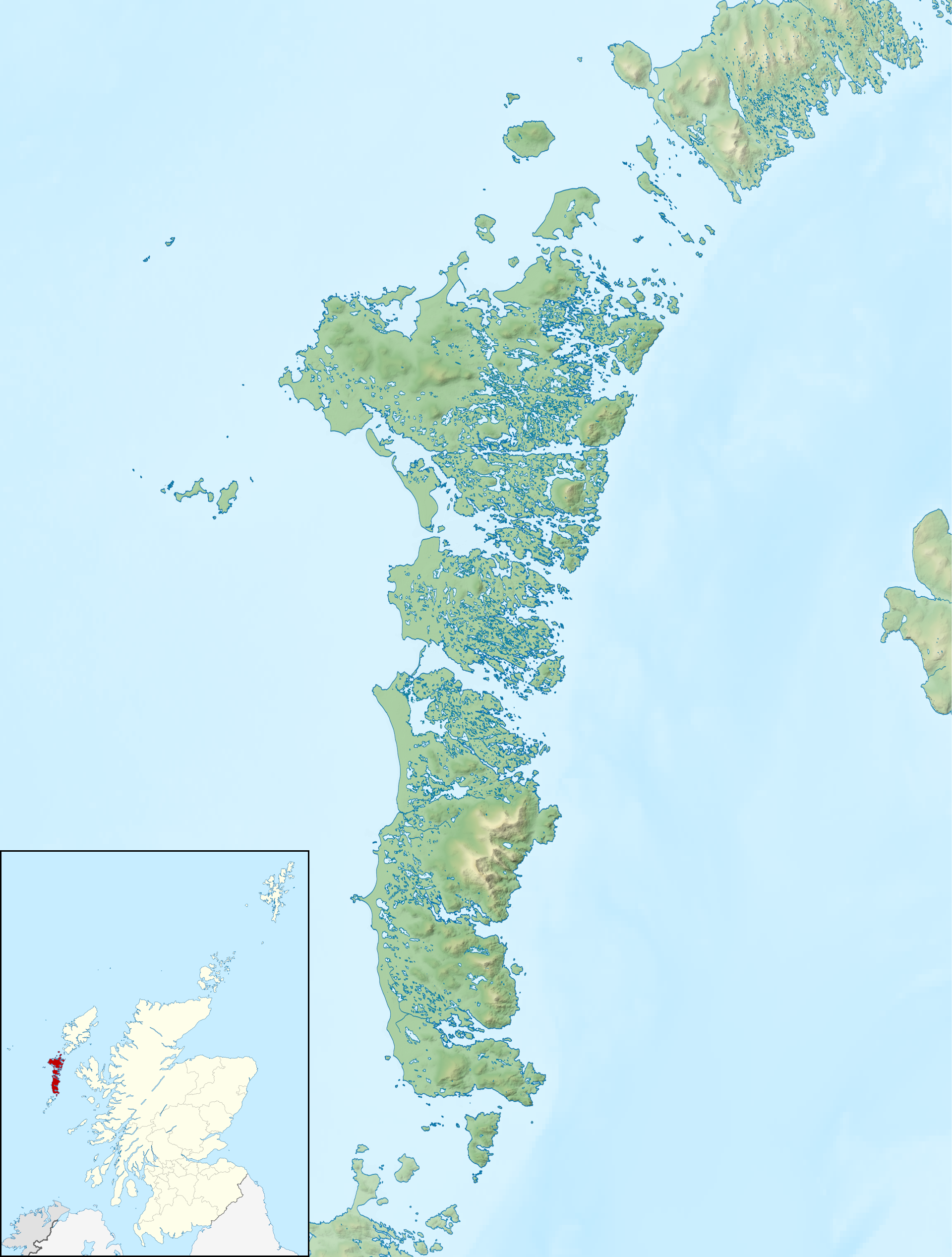
- Map of Uist Uist shown within the Outer Hebrides Uist shown within Scotland
- Coordinates: 57.446°N 7.320°W

Name
- Gaelic pronunciation: [ˈɯ.ɪʃtʲ]
- Name meaning: Uncertain; see Name
- Old Norse name: Ívist

Physical geography
- Highest elevation: Beinn Mhòr 620 metres (2,034 ft)

Administration
- Council area: Outer Hebrides
- Country: Scotland
- Sovereign state: United Kingdom

Demographics
- Population: 4,666 (2022)
- Largest settlement: Balivanich

Uist (/ˈjuːɪst/ or /ˈuːɪst/; Scottish Gaelic: Uibhist [ˈɯ.ɪʃtʲ]) is an archipelago off the west coast of Scotland, which is part of the larger archipelago of the Outer Hebrides. Its three largest islands are North Uist, Benbecula and South Uist.

From north to south, the inhabited islands in the group are Beàrnaraigh (Berneray), Am Baile Sear (Baleshare), Uibhist a Tuath (North Uist), Seana Bhaile, Griomasaigh (Grimsay), Eilean Fhlodaigh (Flodaigh), Beinn nam Faoghla (Benbecula), Grimsay Island (South), Uibhist a Deas (South Uist) and Èirisgeigh (Eriskay). They are joined by causeways into a single road-linked chain, so that in practice the archipelago functions as one long island.

The islands had a population of 4,666 at the 2022 census, down from 4,846 in 2011 and about 6,000 in the 1950s. Just over half of residents speak Gaelic, one of the highest shares in Scotland. North Uist is mainly Presbyterian and South Uist and Eriskay mainly Catholic, with Benbecula between.

The landscape divides sharply from west to east: an Atlantic coast of beaches and flower-rich machair, a peat and loch-strewn interior, and rocky hills to the east. Uist's history includes Britain's only known prehistoric mummies, one of the largest Norse settlements in Britain, Bonnie Prince Charlie's first landing in Scotland and his flight after Culloden, mid-19th-century clearances, a Cold War missile range, and in 2006 Scotland's largest community land buyout. It is also known for its music: piping, Gaelic song and dance music remain part of everyday community life, and Uist musicians are prominent on the Scottish traditional music scene.

== Name ==
The origin of the name is uncertain. It appears in Old Norse as Ívist, which Norse speakers could read as "abode" or "dwelling"; Gammeltoft (2007) argues it is an older, non-Gaelic name that Norse speakers adapted, while Clancy (2018) suggests Ívist is a Norse rendering of an earlier Gaelic name linked to Ptolemy's Ebudae. Other proposed meanings include "west" and a Gaelic "corn island". In 1549 Donald Monro described North Uist, Benbecula and South Uist as a single island, "Ywst", cut by tidal fords.

== Geography ==
The islands run roughly north to south between the Sound of Harris and the Sound of Barra. The North Ford and South Ford, wide tidal sands either side of Benbecula, were crossed on foot at low tide until causeways replaced them in the 20th century.

=== Landscape ===
The bedrock is Lewisian gneiss, whose oldest elements formed between about 3.1 and 2.5 billion years ago. The west coast is an almost unbroken strand of beach, dune and machair; inland lie the peaty "blacklands" and hundreds of lochs, and the east is hill and rocky coast. The highest point is Beinn Mhòr on South Uist, at 620 metres (2,034 ft). North Uist's coastline is so fragmented by inlets and lochans that land, sea and fresh water often blur together.

=== Islands and settlements ===
Balivanich on Benbecula is the islands' main settlement and the site of Benbecula Airport. Lochmaddy (North Uist) and Lochboisdale (South Uist) are the ferry ports.

Inhabited islands and main settlements (north to south) (Note: The 2022 figures may not add up exactly, because the census makes small changes to some numbers to protect people's privacy.)
Island	Gaelic name	Population (2011)	Population (2022)	Main settlements
Berneray	Beàrnaraigh	138	142	–
North Uist	Uibhist a Tuath	1,254	1,208	Solas (Sollas); Loch nam Madadh (Lochmaddy); Baile Mòr (Balemore); Ceann a' Bhàigh (Bayhead); Càirinis (Carinish)
Baleshare	Am Baile Sear	58	53	–
Grimsay (North)	Griomasaigh	169	149	–
Benbecula	Beinn nam Faoghla	1,303	1,255	Baile a' Mhanaich (Balivanich); Lioniclate (Liniclate, Lionacleit); Creag Ghoraidh (Creagorry)
Flodaigh	Flodaigh	7	4	–
Grimsay (South)	Griomasaigh	20	27	–
South Uist	Uibhist a Deas	1,754	1,650	Iochdar (Eochar); Snaoishabhal (Snishvale); Staoinebrig (Stoneybridge); Dalabrog (Daliburgh); Loch Baghasdail (Lochboisdale); Pollochar (Polochar)
Eriskay	Èirisgeigh	143	158	–

== History ==
The machair's deep, wind-blown sand has preserved settlement remains from about 2000 BC to the medieval period, making Uist one of the richest archaeological landscapes in Britain. For most of the last millennium the islands were held by branches of Clan Donald, until debt brought sales to absentee owners and the clearances of the 1840s and 1850s. In the 20th century, causeways, the military and community ownership reshaped island life.

=== Prehistory and the Norse period ===
In about 2000 BC farmers built roundhouses at Cladh Hallan on the Daliburgh machair, South Uist. Bodies buried beneath them, found in 2001, had been mummified and kept for generations; they are the only prehistoric mummies known in Britain, and some are composites of several people.

Norse settlers arrived from about 800. Bornais, South Uist, is one of the largest rural Norse settlements known in Britain, and was home to a family of high rank in the Kingdom of Man and the Isles. After the Norse period ended in 1266, the islands passed to the Lordship of the Isles and then the Scottish crown.

=== Clan Donald and Monro's description ===
From the 1370s South Uist and Benbecula belonged to the MacDonalds of Clanranald, who held them until 1838, while North Uist was held by the MacDonalds of Sleat.

Writing in 1549, Sir Donald Monro, High Dean of the Isles stated of "Ywst" that it was a fertile country full of high hills and forests on the east coast with five parish kirks. He also noted that in the north of "Ywst ther is sundrie covis and holes in the earth, coverit with heddir above, quhilk fosters maney rebellis in the countrey".

Monro referred to the "infinite number of fresh water loches", including Loch Bì, which is South Uist's largest loch and at eight kilometres (five miles) long it all but cuts the island in two. Monro stated that "the sea has gotten enteries to this fresche water loche" and described the "thicke dyke of rough staines" that had been created to prevent salt water ingress. This apparently resulted in numerous fish being caught in the stones, including "fluikes, podloches, skatts, and herings" and he described another "kynd of fishe, the quhantitie and shape of ane salmont, but it has na skaills at all; the under haffe, narrest his vombe is quhite, and the upmaist haffe narrest his back is als black as jett".

On land tenure, Monro wrote:

This countrey is bruiked by sundrey captains; to witt, the south southwest end of it, callit Bayhastill, be M’Neill of Barray, the rest of the ile, namit Peiter’s parochin, the parochin of Howes, and the mayne land of the mid countrey callit Mackermeanache, perteins to Clanronald, halding of the Clandonald. At the end heirof the sea enters, and cuts the countrey be ebbing and flowing through it: and in the north syde of this there is ane parochin callit Buchagla, perteining to the said Clandonald. At the north end thereof the sea cuts the countrey againe, and that cutting of the sea is called Careynesse, and benorth this countrey is called Kenehnache of Ywst, that is in Englishe, the north head of Ywst, whilk term is twa paroche kirks, and is mair of profit than the rest of haill of Ywst, perteining to Donald Gormesone.

=== Bonnie Prince Charlie ===
Anonymous - Prince Charles Edward Stewart, 1720 - 1788

Charles Edward Stuart (Bonnie Prince Charlie) first set foot in Scotland on Eriskay on 23 July 1745, when the French ship Du Teillay put him ashore at the beach now called Coilleag a' Phrionnsa ("the Prince's cockleshell strand"). Alexander MacDonald of Boisdale urged him to go home; Charles is reported to have replied "I am come home, sir" before sailing for the mainland to raise his standard at Glenfinnan. Pink sea bindweed on the beach, not native to the Hebrides, is said to have grown from seeds that fell from his pocket.

After his defeat at the Battle of Culloden on 16 April 1746, the Prince fled to the Outer Hebrides, landing at Rossinish on Benbecula. For about nine weeks, from 27 April to 28 June, local people hid him from government troops and militia, guided by Neil MacEachen. His main refuge was Glen Corodale on the east side of South Uist, and he also sheltered on the island of Wiay and around Loch Boisdale. Flora MacDonald, who was born at Milton, South Uist, first met him on 21 June. On 28 June she aided his escape from Rossinish to Kilbride, Skye, disguised as her Irish maid "Betty Burke". A cairn at Coilleag a' Phrionnsa, built by Eriskay schoolchildren in 1995, and the Bonnie Prince Charlie Trail mark his time in the islands.

=== Emigration and clearances ===
Large-scale emigration to Cape Breton and Prince Edward Island began in the 1770s. In 1838 Clanranald sold South Uist and Benbecula for £120,000 to Colonel John Gordon of Cluny. In the Sollas evictions of 1849 on North Uist, Lord Macdonald moved to clear 600–700 famine-stricken tenants; they resisted, police were brought from Inverness, and the clearance went ahead. In 1851, after a compulsory meeting at Lochboisdale on 11 August, Gordon's agents forced tenants aboard emigrant ships, and up to 3,000 people from his South Uist, Benbecula and Barra estates were shipped to Canada. The Gordon family's ownership of South Uist lasted until 1944.

=== 20th and 21st centuries ===
In 1941 SS Politician ran aground off Eriskay carrying about 28,000 cases of whisky. Islanders salvaged much of it, and Compton Mackenzie turned the episode into Whisky Galore (1947).

Fixed links gradually joined the islands into one road-linked chain. A single-lane bridge was built across the South Ford in 1942, and the North Ford Causeway opened on 7 September 1960, linking North Uist to Benbecula. A two-lane causeway replaced the South Ford bridge on 18 November 1982. The Berneray Causeway was officially opened on 8 April 1999, after the ferry stopped in December 1998, and the Eriskay Causeway opened to traffic in July 2001, completing the road link from Berneray to Eriskay.

In 1957–58 the Ministry of Defence built a guided-weapons range on South Uist, despite protests over the compulsory acquisition of croft land. Opposition was led by Fr John Morrison, who commissioned Hew Lorimer's statue Our Lady of the Isles; 3,000 people attended its dedication in 1958. In 1974 hedgehogs were released in a Daliburgh garden; their spread later devastated wading birds (see Wildlife).

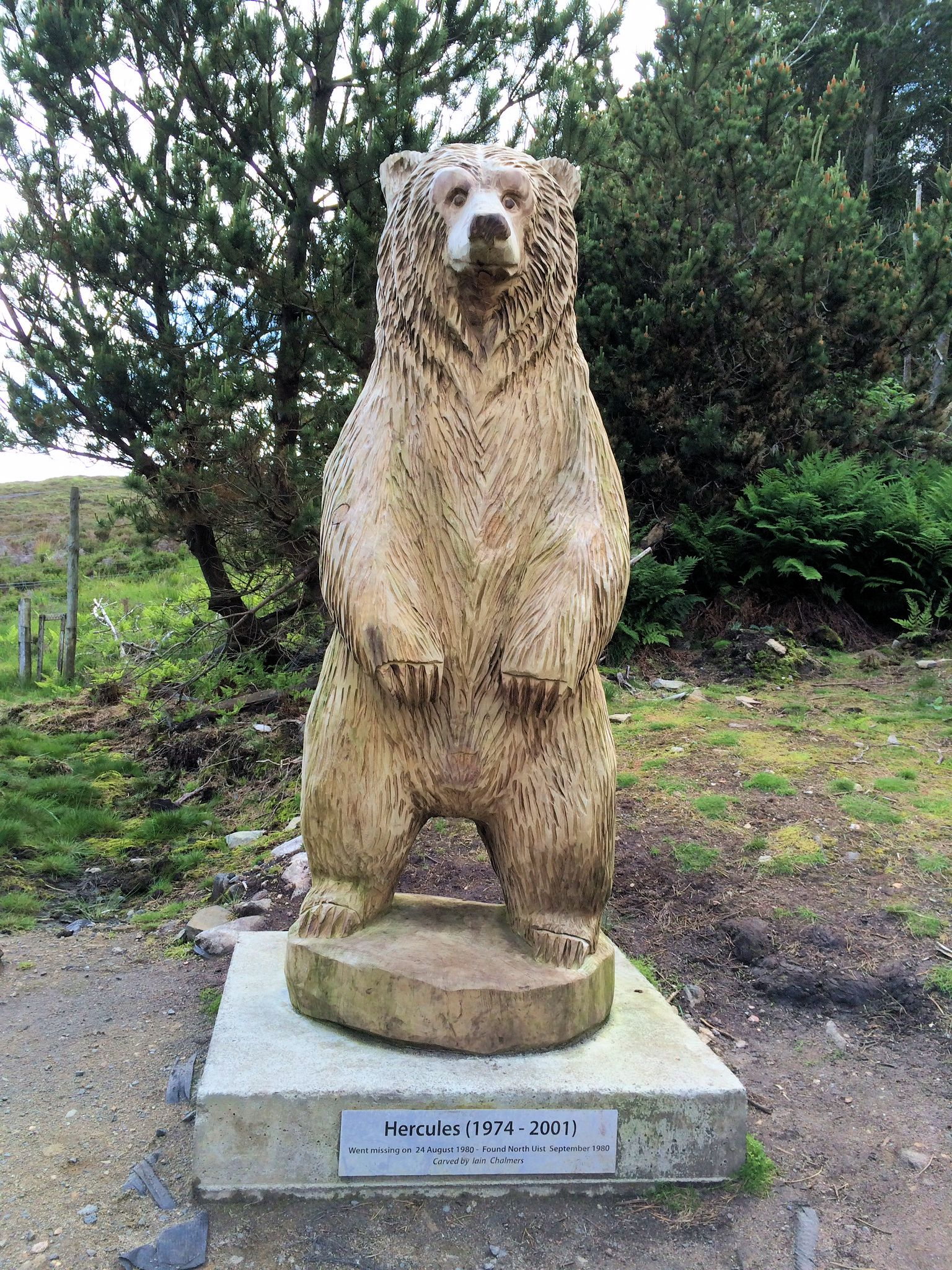
Hercules the bear statue, Langass Woodland, North Uist

In August 1980 Hercules, a performing grizzly bear owned by wrestler Andy Robin and his wife Maggie, escaped while filming a Kleenex advertisement on Benbecula, where the couple were visiting Maggie's relatives. For 24 days he evaded the army, police and hundreds of volunteers in a land, sea and air search that drew worldwide coverage. On 13 September a crofter spotted him on North Uist, about 20 miles (32 km) from where he had gone missing, and he was recaptured with a tranquilliser dart. He had lost about 20 stone, a third of his weight, without attacking any of the islands' sheep or cattle.

Hercules went on to appear in the James Bond film Octopussy (1983) and died in 2000. In 2013 North Uist Woodland Trust unveiled a life-size wooden statue of him in Langass Woodland, and in 2015 his remains were reburied beside it; Andy Robin is buried there too. The episode also inspired Bella Pollen's novel The Summer of the Bear (2010).

On 11 January 2005 a storm flooded the South Ford area. Five members of one family drowned when their cars were swept off the road at Iochdar; the South Ford causeway is widely believed to have acted as a dam.

On 30 November 2006 community company Stòras Uibhist bought the 93,000 acres (380 km^{2}) South Uist Estate, covering Eriskay, most of South Uist and part of Benbecula, for £4.5 million. It was Scotland's largest community land buyout.

== Population ==
Uist's population has fallen by about a fifth since 1951, with one exception: Benbecula roughly doubled between 1951 and 1981, the decades when the missile range and its support base were built.

Population by area
Year	North Uist area	Benbecula area	South Uist area	Total
1951	2,221	924	2,840	5,985
1961	1,925	1,358	2,637	5,920
1971	1,726	1,355	2,517	5,598
1981	1,803	1,887	2,432	6,122
1991	1,815	1,803	2,285	5,903
2001	1,657	1,249	1,951	4,857
2011	1,619	1,330	1,897	4,846
2022	1,574	1,286	1,806	4,666

Areas include their linked smaller islands: North Uist with Berneray, Baleshare and Grimsay; Benbecula with Flodaigh and southern Grimsay; South Uist with Eriskay. Figures before 1981 count persons present rather than residents.

== Language and religion ==
Gaelic is the everyday language of much of the community. At the 2022 census, 54.8% of people in South Uist and Benbecula spoke Gaelic (down from 60% in 2011) and 51.7% in North Uist (down from 61%).

The Outer Hebrides' Protestant–Catholic divide runs through Uist. North Uist and Berneray are predominantly Presbyterian, with Free Church and Church of Scotland congregations; South Uist and Eriskay are predominantly Catholic, and Benbecula is mixed. Sunday observance is stricter in the north. Wayside shrines and the 9-metre (30 ft) Our Lady of the Isles on Rueval mark the Catholic south.

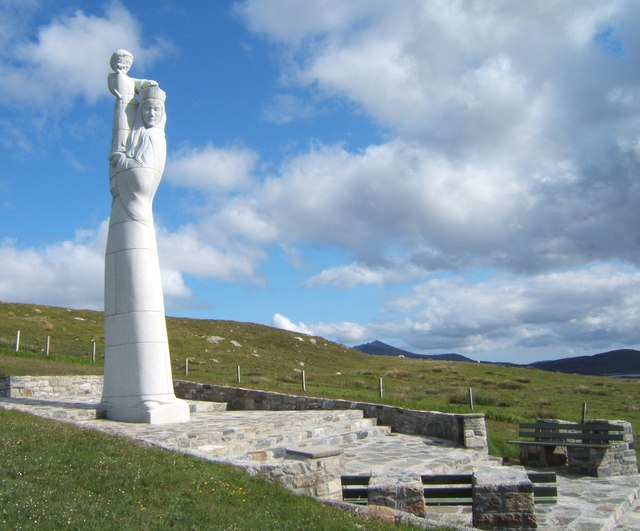
Our Lady of the Isles,1956, sculpted by Hew Lorimer.

== Folklore collecting ==
South Uist's oral tradition is among the best recorded in Gaelic Scotland. Fr Allan McDonald, parish priest of Daliburgh and Eriskay from 1884 to 1905, compiled a large folklore collection, much of it later plagiarised by Ada Goodrich Freer. In the 1930s the American Margaret Fay Shaw lived near Lochboisdale recording songs and stories, published as Folksongs and Folklore of South Uist (1955). Her husband John Lorne Campbell, whom she met at the Lochboisdale Hotel in 1934, edited Fr Allan's work and the tales of storyteller Angus MacLellan.

== Music and song ==
Music is central to Uist life, and the islands have produced many well-known pipers, singers and dance musicians. Folklorists from Alexander Carmichael to John Lorne Campbell regarded South Uist as the Highlands' last storehouse of Gaelic tradition.

=== Piping ===
South Uist has long had a particular reputation for its pipers, rooted in Clanranald patronage and a strong community role for the village piper at weddings and dances. Many pipers were ear-learned, and pipe tunes were often passed on by singing them (canntaireachd), with women important as tradition-bearers. Emigrant pipers carried the Uist dance-piping style to Cape Breton, where it survived. Notable pipers include Angus MacDonald of Milton (1899–1968), "the King of Jigs", and the blind Benbecula piper Lachlan Bàn MacCormick, composer of "The South Uist Golf Club". The tradition continues through the Uist Pipe Band, school piping tuition, and the Glasgow Uist and Barra Association's solo competition, first held in the 1940s.

=== Song ===
Uist's Gaelic song tradition, from waulking songs to the work of local bards, has been widely recorded since the 1930s. Singers from the islands include Julie Fowlis of North Uist, probably the most successful artist working mainly in Gaelic, whose album Cuilidh (2007) drew on North Uist songs; Kathleen MacInnes of South Uist, Gaelic Singer of the Year at the 2006 Scots Trad Music Awards; and Gillebrìde MacMillan, a Mòd gold medallist. In 2022 Ruairidh Gray of Daliburgh became only the second singer to win both of the Royal National Mòd's gold medals in the same year. Calum and Rory Macdonald of Runrig grew up on North Uist.

=== Dance music and Cèolas ===
The "West Coast" ceilidh-band style, built on accordion, pipes and fiddle for dancing, is strong in Uist; accordionist Iain MacLachlainn is remembered locally as a legend of the old melodeon style. Cèolas, founded in 1996 by Hamish Moore, began as a summer school to bring back Gaelic music and step dance preserved by Uist emigrants in Cape Breton. Held each July in Daliburgh, it teaches piping, fiddle, song, step dance, reels and Gaelic, and now runs year-round from Cnoc Soilleir, a Gaelic arts centre shared with University of the Highlands and Islands (UHI). Fiddle playing has grown among young people since 2019, when Beinn Lee's Anna Black began teaching it in Uist. UHI's Benbecula campus also teaches Gaelic and traditional music.

=== Bands and festival ===
Trail West, Scottish Dance Band of the Year in 2013, pairs Tiree musicians with South Uist piper Seonaidh MacIntyre from Loch Carnan. Beinn Lee, formed in 2013, draws its six members from North Uist, Grimsay and South Uist and plays tunes and songs in Gaelic and English. Beinn Lee's singer James Stewart, from Grimsay, became lead singer of Skipinnish from 2026 after touring with the band in earlier years, and continues with Beinn Lee. Trail West and Beinn Lee regularly headline the Eilean Dorcha Festival, a volunteer-run festival on the Liniclate machair, Benbecula, since 2016; Skipinnish headlined its first year. Early festivals drew around 3,000 people and over £500,000 for the local economy; in 2022 it drew 4,999 people, and an independent assessment put its value at about £1 million. At the 2023 Scots Trad Music Awards, Uist was represented in seven categories, including Beinn Lee (Folk Band), Trail West (Live Act), Julie Fowlis (Musician), Gillebrìde MacMillan (Gaelic Singer) and the festival itself (Event of the Year).

== Arts and media ==
=== Literature ===
Uist has been the setting for, or inspiration behind, a number of novels in English and Gaelic:

- Whisky Galore (1947) and Rockets Galore (1957) by Compton Mackenzie, set on the fictional islands of Great and Little Todday. The first draws on the wreck of SS Politician off Eriskay, the second on opposition to the South Uist rocket range.
- An Oidhche Mus do Sheòl Sinn (2003) by Angus Peter Campbell, born in South Lochboisdale. The Gaelic novel follows a South Uist family through the 20th century; it was shortlisted for the Saltire Book of the Year in 2004 and voted into the top ten of The List's 100 best Scottish books.
- The Summer of the Bear (2010) by Bella Pollen, set on a lightly fictionalised North Uist in the summer of Hercules' escape.
- The House Between Tides by Sarah Maine, first published as Bhalla Strand, set on North Uist across two timelines and named Waterstones Scottish Book of the Year in 2018.
- Tia's Story by Kirsty White, about a preacher's daughter growing up on North Uist and spending summers in Benbecula.
- Benbecula (2025) by Graeme Macrae Burnet, in Birlinn's Darkland Tales series. It retells the 1857 killing of his parents and aunt by Angus MacPhee, drawing on letters, asylum records and witness statements, and was longlisted for the Highland Book Prize and the Walter Scott Prize.
- The Long Isle (2026) by Andrew Raymond, the first of a Hebrides crime series, in which a Uist-born detective investigates a priest's murder on a South Uist beach.

=== Visual art ===
The North Ford, Uist, 1894. Robert Weir Allan (Glasgow, 1851-1942). Oil on canvas.

The Glasgow painter Robert Weir Allan painted The North Ford, Uist (1894), now in Aberdeen Art Gallery. The symbolist John Duncan first came to Eriskay in 1904; the next year he persuaded Marjory Kennedy-Fraser to join him, beginning her collecting of Eriskay and Hebridean songs. His Uist work includes a view from South Uist's south shore across the Sound of Eriskay. Winifred Nicholson painted on South Uist around 1950 and called it "the place after my heart". Frances Walker went to North Uist and Harris in 1953 as their only art teacher and drew and painted the Western Isles until 1979; her folding screen Machair Walk, a view across the South Uist machair, belongs to the Royal Scottish Academy.

The American photographer Paul Strand photographed South Uist's crofters, their homes and the landscape in 1954. The pictures were published as Tir a'Mhurain ("land of bent grass") in 1962 by MacGibbon & Kee, with text by Basil Davidson, and prints are held by the Victoria and Albert (V&A) Museum and the National Galleries of Scotland. The illustrator Mairi Hedderwick, creator of Katie Morag, drew and painted Uist for An Eye on the Hebrides (1989), a record in watercolours and pen drawings of her six-month journey around some 40 Hebridean islands.

Two Iochdar artists, Angus MacPhee (1916–1997), whose woven grass pieces recalled his crofting life, and Flora Johnstone (1899–1992), have been recognised as outsider artists.

Taigh Chearsabhagh in Lochmaddy is the islands' museum and contemporary arts centre, with artists' commissions and residencies, a print workshop and a darkroom. The Uist Sculpture Trail runs through North Uist and Benbecula; its best-known work is Chris Drury's camera obscura Both nam Faileas (Hut of the Shadow) near Lochmaddy.

=== Film ===
Whisky Galore! (1949), adapted from Compton Mackenzie's novel about the wreck of SS Politician off Eriskay, was filmed on neighbouring Barra, which stood in for Eriskay. Its sequel Rockets Galore! (1958) drew on opposition to the South Uist rocket range.

Limbo (2020), Ben Sharrock's comedy-drama about refugees waiting for asylum decisions on a remote Scottish island, was the first feature film shot entirely in Uist. It was filmed in late 2019, with islanders as extras, and was in the 2020 Cannes Official Selection. It won four BAFTA Scotland awards and received two BAFTA nominations.

=== Newspaper ===
Am Pàipear (Gaelic for "the paper") is the islands' community newspaper, first published on Benbecula in 1976. It serves more than 4,000 people on five islands, and is run as a social enterprise by a board of volunteer directors as a subsidiary of Uist Council of Voluntary Organisations; it has won the Highlands and Islands Media Awards' Community Newspaper of the Year a record six times. Its archive is a running record of island life, from the arrival of the military to land ownership, and was the subject of a BBC Alba Trusadh documentary for its 40th anniversary in 2016. A subscription digital edition was added in 2021.

== Economy ==
Sheep and abandoned croft house, North Uist

Crofting remains the basis of land use. The South Uist Estate alone includes about 1,000 crofts, and since 2006 has been run by Stòras Uibhist, which also owns a 6.9 MW community wind farm at Lochcarnan. North Uist has its own community-owned wind farm, UistWind: two turbines (1.8 MW) at Clachan, commissioned in 2019 and funded partly by 220 community shareholders. Defence has been the other large employer since the 1950s: the Hebrides range on South Uist, now operated by QinetiQ, is run from Benbecula, and the RAF radar station RRH Benbecula stands on North Uist. Fishing, aquaculture, public services and tourism make up much of the rest.

Spaceport 1, a small vertical rocket-launch site at Scolpaig on North Uist's west coast, is being developed by Comhairle nan Eilean Siar. It received planning consent in July 2023 despite objections about its effect on nearby protected bird sites. Enabling works were built between November 2024 and April 2025, with £947,211 from Highlands and Islands Enterprise. As of mid-2025 no launch operator had been appointed, and launches also depend on approval of an airspace change and a habitat management plan.

== Transport ==
The A865 runs the length of the chain over the causeways. CalMac ferries link Lochmaddy with Uig on Skye, Lochboisdale with Mallaig, Berneray with Leverburgh on Harris, and Eriskay with Ardmhòr on Barra. Benbecula Airport has Loganair flights to Glasgow and Hebridean Air Services flights to Stornoway.

=== Ferry reliability ===
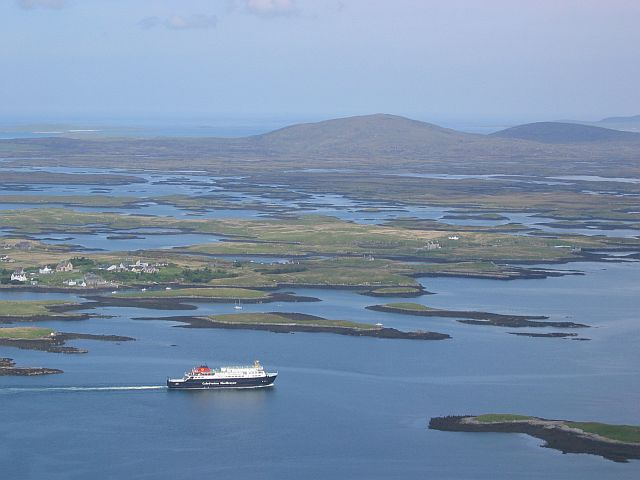
Caledonian MacBrayne ferry MV Hebrides leaving Lochmaddy, North Uist en route for Skye

Unreliable ferries have been a defining economic problem for Uist since the 2010s, as CalMac's ageing fleet left little spare capacity to cover breakdowns. South Uist has been hit hardest: over three recent contract years, 35% of scheduled Mallaig–Lochboisdale sailings were cancelled, the highest rate on the network, and in 2022 the route ran to timetable on only 74% of days, against about 90% in earlier years. After a two-week loss of service in May 2022, a study commissioned by Stòras Uibhist with Highlands and Islands Enterprise found 91% of 395 Uist and Barra businesses affected and losses of about £648,000. The Mallaig crossing was cancelled for almost all of June 2023, and later cuts left South Uist with mainland sailings on only three days a week.

The disruption has hit tourism and food producers, and kept residents from mainland appointments. In 2025 the Scottish Government set up a £4.5 million Islands Business Resilience Fund, prioritising South Uist, North Uist, Benbecula and Eriskay among others. Two new ferries, MV Lochmor and MV Claymore, are being built in Türkiye to give Lochmaddy, Tarbert and Uig a two-vessel service, with delivery expected in 2027. A separate new vessel for Mallaig–Lochboisdale is at an earlier stage.

== Wildlife ==
Arctic Tern, Balranald, North Uist

Uist holds the most extensive machair in Britain and one of the largest concentrations of breeding waders in Europe, including dunlin, ringed plover, redshank, snipe and lapwing. The South Uist machair lochs hold the largest cluster of slender naiad sites in the UK. RSPB Balranald on North Uist, founded in 1966 and farmed by crofters rather than owned by the RSPB, is a key site for the corncrake; it recorded 30 singing males in 2025, against 12 in 1982.

The hedgehogs released in 1974 spread north to about 3,900 animals by 2010 and became the main predator of wader nests: in South Uist, hedgehogs caused more than half of recorded nest losses. A lethal cull from 2003 drew wide public protest and was replaced by live trapping and translocation to the mainland. Removal on North Uist was largely complete by 2018, while full removal from Benbecula and South Uist awaits funding.

== Climate change ==
Grassy sand dune, North Uist

Climate change is the main long-term threat to Uist's west coast, because much of the machair and blackland is low-lying and some croft land already sits below high-tide level behind dunes. Projections for north-west Scotland combine rising sea level, wetter winters and more frequent, severe winter storms; the Scottish Environment Protection Agency estimates sea level around South Uist will rise by at least 37 centimetres (15 in) by 2080. NatureScot puts the current relative rise at about 6 millimetres (0.24 in) a year, partly because the islands are slowly tilting into the sea.

The risks are erosion and breaching of the dune ridge, sea water overtopping onto the machair, and flooding from behind as drains back up. Parts of the drainage network are about 250 years old, and as sea level rises they will carry water away less effectively; NatureScot's Stewart Angus has warned of salt water entering the water table, harming crofting and wildlife. The machair may survive by rolling inland, but only where space and sand supply allow. The January 2005 storm showed the scale of the danger, cutting back the coast and flooding Iochdar.

Responses have included sea defences and a community-built defence bund after 2005, and crofter-led dune repair such as fencing dunes from grazing, plugging breaches with silage bales and, on Baleshare, returning storm-thrown shingle to the beach. A 2012 study found an opening in the South Ford causeway would have greatly reduced the 2005 flooding, and a South Ford Flood Risk Management Scheme reached pre-application scoping in December 2024. Researchers have also proposed rebuilding dune ridges, protecting offshore kelp beds that absorb wave energy, and renewing drainage with crofters.

== See also ==
- List of Outer Hebrides
- Propataireachd
- Còmhla-bhigein
- MOD Hebrides
