= Bobbie Allen (disambiguation) =

Bobbie R. Allen (1922–1972) was an American aviator and government official.

Bobbie Allen may also refer to:

- Bobbie Allen, English horsewoman and hotelier at the Manor House Hotel
- Bobbie Allen, American runner and first female winner of the Richmond Marathon
- Bobbie Allen, American singer-songwriter known as Young Summer

== See also ==
- Robert Allen (disambiguation)
