= Còmhla-bhigein =

Scottish bird trap

The Còmhla-bhigein was a trap for small birds in the Uist, Scotland in former times. It consisted of a riddle resting on the ground, with one end held up by a stick. Seed was placed under the riddle, and the stick was snatched away by a string attached to it as soon as the birds began to eat the seed.

The basic design of the trap is similar to ones found all over the world.

The name literally means "together" (còmhla), "little bird" (bigean/bigein)

== See also ==
- Birdlime
- Heligoland trap
