= Arthur Melville =

Scottish painter (1855–1904)

Arthur Melville RWS ARSA
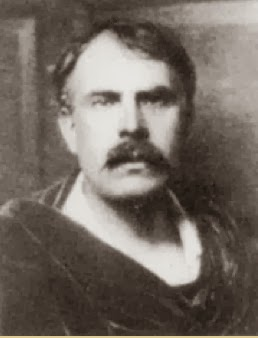
- Born: 10 April 1855; Loanhead-of-Guthrie, Forfarshire, Scotland
- Died: 28 August 1904 (aged 49); Witley, Surrey, England
- Resting place: Brookwood Common, Pirbright, Surrey; 51.29317802401124, -0.6269166346426999
- Education: Royal Scottish Academy School; Académie Julian
- Known for: Painting
- Spouse(s): Ethel Melville, née Croall (1872–1917)

Arthur Melville (1855–1904) was a Scottish painter of Orientalist subjects, among others.

== Early life and art education ==
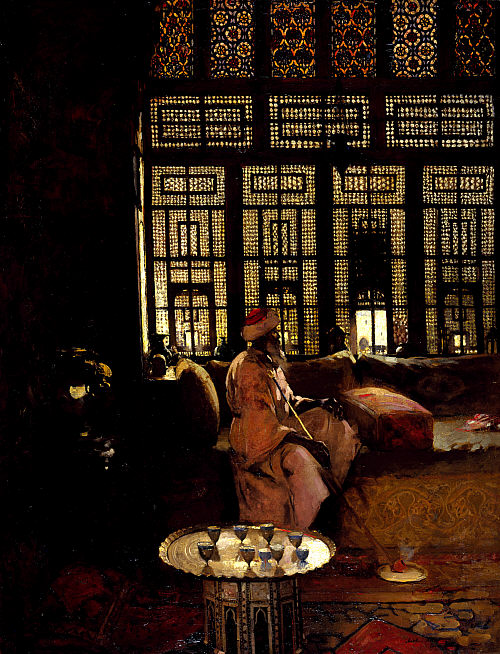
An Arab Interior (1881; National Gallery of Scotland)

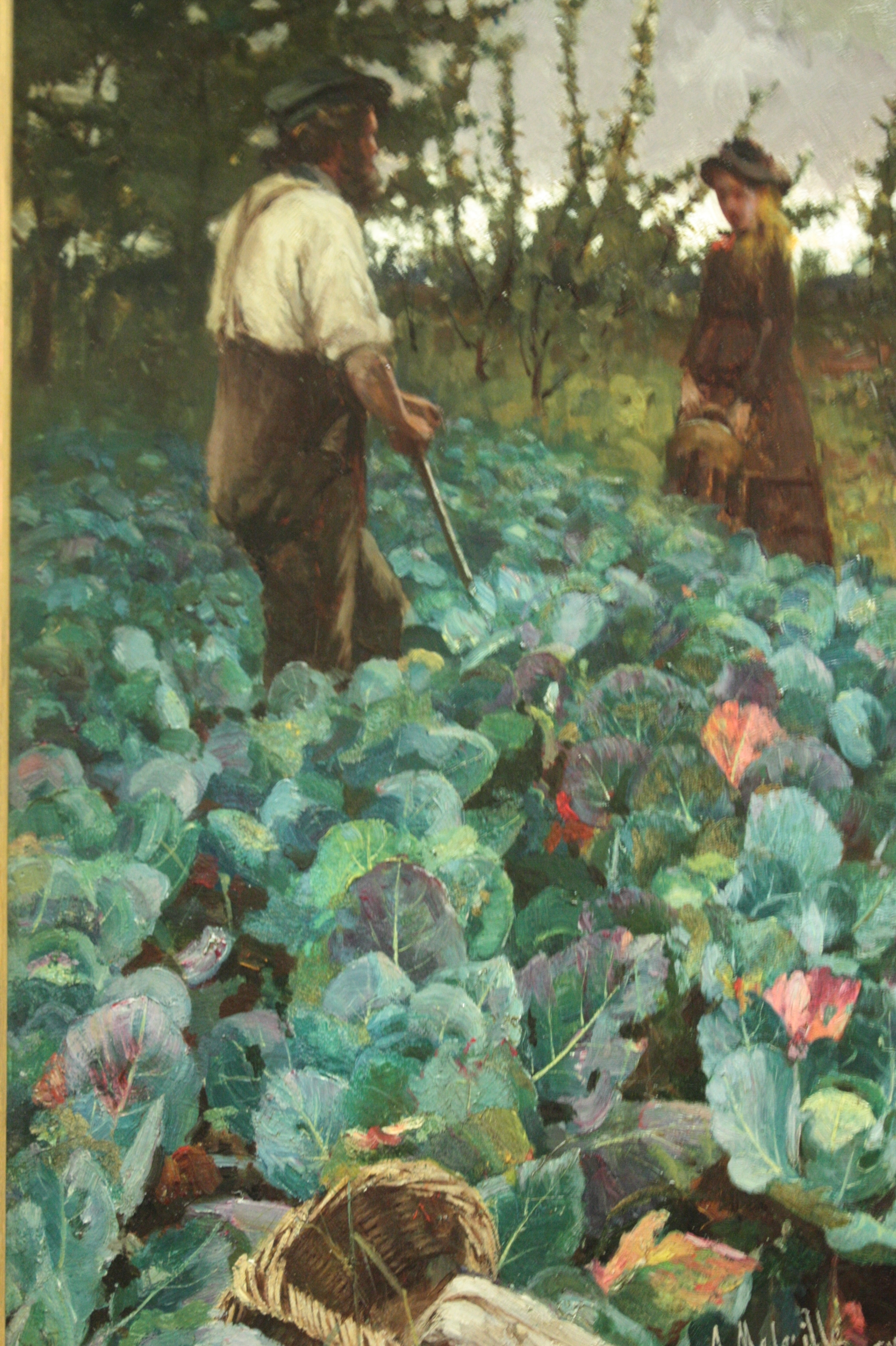
A Cabbage Garden by Arthur Melville, 1877

Arthur Melville was born in Loanhead-of-Guthrie, Forfarshire (now Angus, Scotland) on 10 April 1855. The family moved to East Linton, Haddingtonshire (now East Lothian), around the 1860s. He took up painting while working as a grocer's apprentice and he attended evening art classes in Edinburgh - his biographer (Agnes E. Mackay who was his niece) indicated that he often walked the eight miles there and back. In 1874 he was employed as a bookkeeper in Dalkeith. He became a fulltime student at the Royal Scottish Academy School under John Campbell Noble. He was also influenced by John Robertson Reid. At the age of 22, in 1877, he had his painting, 'A Cabbage Garden', accepted by the Royal Academy. Melville sold the painting to James Hunter Annandale, a Lasswade paper manufacturer, and this partially financed the artist's studies in Paris from 1878 to 1880.

in 1878 he travelled to Paris and enrolled at the Atelier Julian (Académie Julian). Here he began to learn about the intricacies of watercolour painting although his niece writes that he spent much time admiring the work of other artists - she mentions Monet's Les Dindons as an influence with its movement, colour and light. He had met a Scottish artist, Robert Weir Allan, who had introduced him to the Impressionists. He then spent the summer of 1879 in Grez-sur-Loing. At Grez-sur-Loing a number of artists gathered and they were en plain air adherents, many being followers of Jules Bastien-Lepage. As well as Grez-sur-Loing, Melville visited Granville, Honfleur. He seemed keen to find peasant models who would pose en plein air following in the footsteps of the work of French rural Naturalists. He returned to Edinburgh early in the summer of 1880 and he took a studio in Shandwick Place which he shared with his brother George, a medical student. He only stayed a few months as he intended to return to France and then to travel to the Middle East.

== Travels ==
The colour-sense which is so notable a feature of Melville's work developed during his travels in Persia, Egypt and Turkey between 1880 and 1882, where he sometimes travelled alone on long inland journeys. To convey strong Middle Eastern light, he developed a technique of using watercolour on a base of wet paper with gouache applied to it.

Melville, though comparatively little known during his lifetime, was one of the most powerful influences in the contemporary art of his day, especially in his broad decorative treatment with watercolour, which influenced the Glasgow Boys. Though his vivid impressions of colour and movement are apparently recorded with feverish haste, they are the result of careful deliberation and selection. He was at his best in his watercolours of Eastern life and colour and his Venetian scenes, but he also painted several striking portraits in oils and a powerful composition of The Return from the Crucifixion which remained unfinished at his death in 1904. The Victoria and Albert Museum has one of his watercolours, The Little Bull-Fight Bravo, Toro! and others, like An Oriental Goatherd in the Weimar Museum, are in many museums, especially in Scotland. Many of his pictures remain with private collectors.

Melville died on 28 August 1904. His ashes were buried at his former home, and in 1909 his widow had them moved to Brookwood Heath, Surrey, next to Brookwood Cemetery.

His gravesite is marked with a memorial stone which was restored in 2023 by the Brookwood Cemetery Society.

A comprehensive memorial exhibition of Melville's works was held at the Royal Institute Galleries in London in 1906.
