= Propataireachd =

Propataireachd – there were two games in Uist, Scotland called by this name.

== First game ==
A game like quoits or pitchers.

The large stones or props are set up on end some distance from each other of about 20 yards (18 metres). The number of players varies from two to six. If more than two play, they can do so singly or in picked sides. The only articles needed are the props and two flat pieces of stone, as nearly balanced as possible, wherewith to toss.

The game goes by points, a certain number, usually twenty one, being agreed on as game. The pointing or scoring, which is not reckoned in the same way anywhere else, is as follows in Uist. Three points if you knock the prop down fairly, one point if that pitcher lies nearer the prop than any other, one point if your other pitcher lies nearer than any of your opponent's. Thus if your two quoits be nearer the prop than your opponent's two, you have two points; if only one is nearer then you have only one point. In the case of two players, both stand at the same prop, endeavouring to hit it or lie as near to it as possible. In the case of sides, say, two on each side, then one member of each side takes the stones, while the other two stand at the opposite prop, and toss each of his two quoits to the best of his ability. These are then in turn, tossed towards them again by those at the other end, the game counting as usual in points.

== Leagail shaighdear ==
Propataireachd or leagail shaighdear ("felling the soldier"), a game played on the same principle as skittles. There are two equal sides of any number, usually about seven, and each player has a prop, which he sticks in the ground just enough to make it stand. Each player is provided with two stones for throwing at the props. The side which wins the toss then starts to knock down as many as possible of their opponents' props down in this way. The first man in the row throws his two quoits trying to knock down as many down as he can; his neighbour follows, and so on, till all the row have thrown their quoits. If they knock down all the opposing props, the game is theirs; if not, their opponents start in exactly the same way to knock theirs down. If they succeed, they win the game; if not, the props are set up again, and play recommences.

== Etymology ==
Propataireachd has as its root word, the English "prop"... "-atair" is equivalent to English "-er", and "-eachd" is perhaps equivalent to "-ing".
