= Robert George Allan =

British agricultural administrator

- Born: 7 November 1879
- Died: 4 January 1972 (aged 92)
- Occupation: Agricultural administrator in British India

Sir Robert George Allan CIE FRSE (7 November 1879 – 4 January 1972) was a British agricultural administrator in British India.

== Life ==
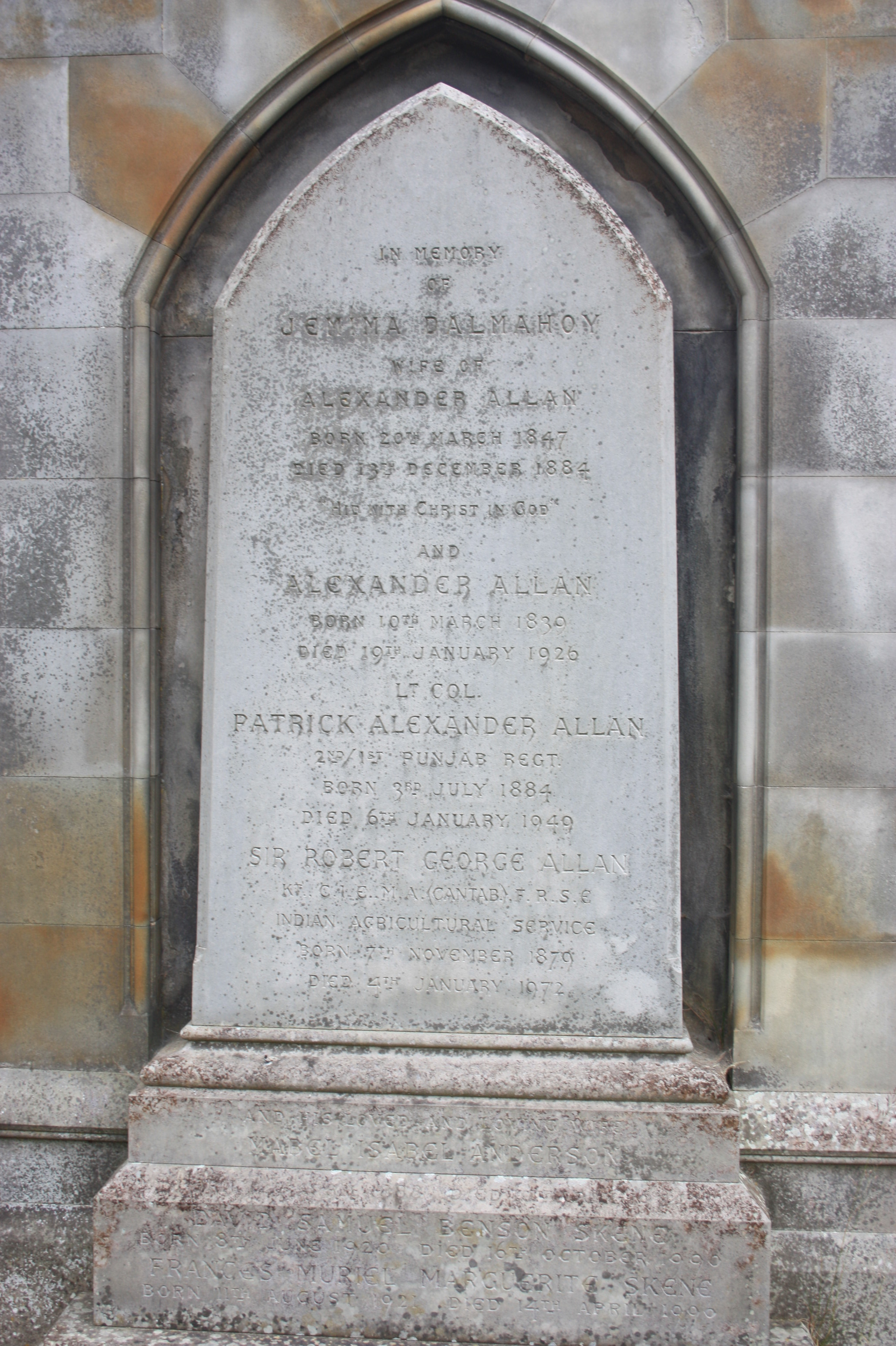
The grave of Sir Robert George Allan, Dean Cemetery

He was born in India, the son of Alexander Allan (1839–1926) and his wife, Jemima Dalmahoy (1847–1884), thought to be a daughter of Patrick Dalmahoy. He was baptised in Madras. His mother died when he was very young.

He was educated at Loretto School then at Haileybury and Imperial Service College (a school catered to training people for administrative service in India). He then studied at Pembroke College, Cambridge graduating MA.

In 1907, he became Principal of the Nagpur Agricultural College in India. In 1926 he became acting director of Agriculture for the Central Provinces of India. In 1931 he became Director of Agriculture for the United Provinces of India. In 1935 he left the Indian Agricultural Service (but not India) to be Commissioner of Agriculture in Baroda. In post-war India from 1944 he served as Minister for Agriculture and Post-War Development.

In 1936, he was created a Commander of the Order of the Indian Empire (CIE) by King George V. He was knighted by King George VI in the 1945 Birthday Honours.

He retired in 1946. In 1948, he was elected a Fellow of the Royal Society of Edinburgh. His proposers were David Clouston, William McRae, James Drever and Sir William Wright Smith.

He died on 4 January 1972, aged 92. He is buried in Dean Cemetery. The grave lies against the north wall of the Victorian north extension.

== Family ==
His paternal grandfather was Robert Allan, son of Thomas Allan.

His younger brother Patrick Alexander Allan (1884–1949) served in the Indian Army.

== Publications ==
- An Outline of Indian Agriculture (1941)
