= Robert Allen (Baptist minister) =

Welsh Baptist minister (1847-1927)

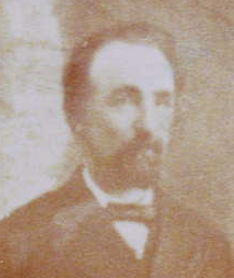
Robert Allen in 1892.

Robert Allen (1847-1927) was a Welsh Baptist minister. He was raised and spent most of his life in the Glamorganshire area.

== Religious Work ==
Robert Allen was born on the 5th of January 1847 in Llanelli, Carmarthenshire to John Allen of Neath and his wife Hannah Allen (née Davies) of Cilrhedyn, Newcastle Emlyn. But he grew up in Neath. He was baptized in Blaen-y-cwm, began to preach in Cwmafan, and was ordained to the ministry on 17 and 18 October 1880 at Bryntroedgam. He remained at the latter place for seven years, thereafter moving to Pontrhyd-y-fen, 1887-90, Capel Rhondda, Hopkinstown, (Pontypridd), 1890-2, Calfaria, Maesteg (Llangynwyd Middle), 1892-1908, and Chapel Philadelphia, Cwm Ogwr, for a short while. He died on the 13 March 1927 in Nantyffyllon, Maesteg. Although he had a small coalmine and a small farm, he showed no great enthusiasm for either the one or the other and was more in his element lecturing. Possessing a homely wit and an exceptional gift of oratory, he delighted his congregations by his unconventional preaching and his even more unconventional acting. He was good friends with fellow minister and author Reverend William Joseph Rhys.
