= Robert Allan (mineralogist) =

British geologist

Robert Allan FRSE FGS (12 October 1806 – 6 June 1863) was a Scottish advocate, stockbroker, and amateur mineralogist. He was author of A Manual of Mineralogy, which set a benchmark within this field.

== Life ==
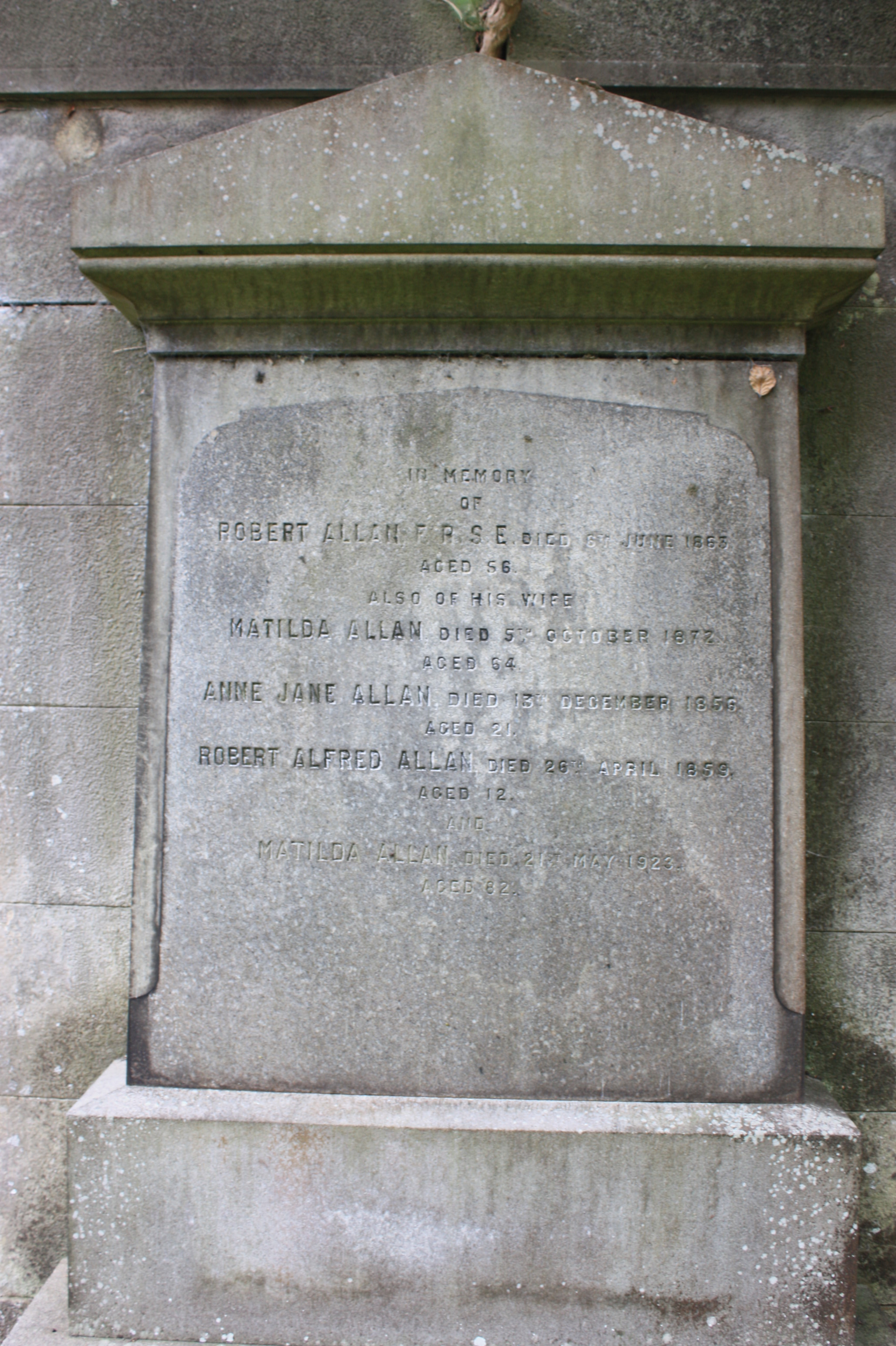
The grave of Robert Allan, Dean Cemetery, Edinburgh

He was born in Edinburgh on 12 October 1806, the son of Thomas Allan. He attended the High School in Edinburgh, and then studied law at the University of Edinburgh.

In 1822, he met Austrian mineralogist Wilhelm Haidinger during the latter's visit to Edinburgh, and who (together with his father) greatly influenced his views. All three were friends and went together on mineral-hunting expeditions both in Britain and Continental Europe.

In 1828, he was elected a Fellow of the Geological Society for his contributions to mineralogy. He was admitted an advocate at the Scottish Bar in 1829. In 1832, he was elected a Fellow of the Royal Society of Edinburgh. His proposer was James Crawford Gregory.

He died on 6 June 1863 at home at 4 Hillside Crescent in the Calton district of Edinburgh. He is buried in Dean Cemetery. His grave lies at the beginning of the narrow south-west spur. His wife Matilda Allan (1808–1872) lies with him.

He had inherited his father’s mineral collection in 1833, and in later life, sold their joint collection to Robert Greg, who on his own death, passed the large and important collection to the British Museum. It now forms a major portion of the mineral collection.

His grandson was the agriculturalist, Sir Robert George Allan FRSE (1879–1972).

== Publications ==
- A Manual of Mineralogy (1834)
- An Elementary Treatise on Mineralogy (1837) a revision of William Philip’s work
