= Robert Weir Allan =

English artist (1851–1942)

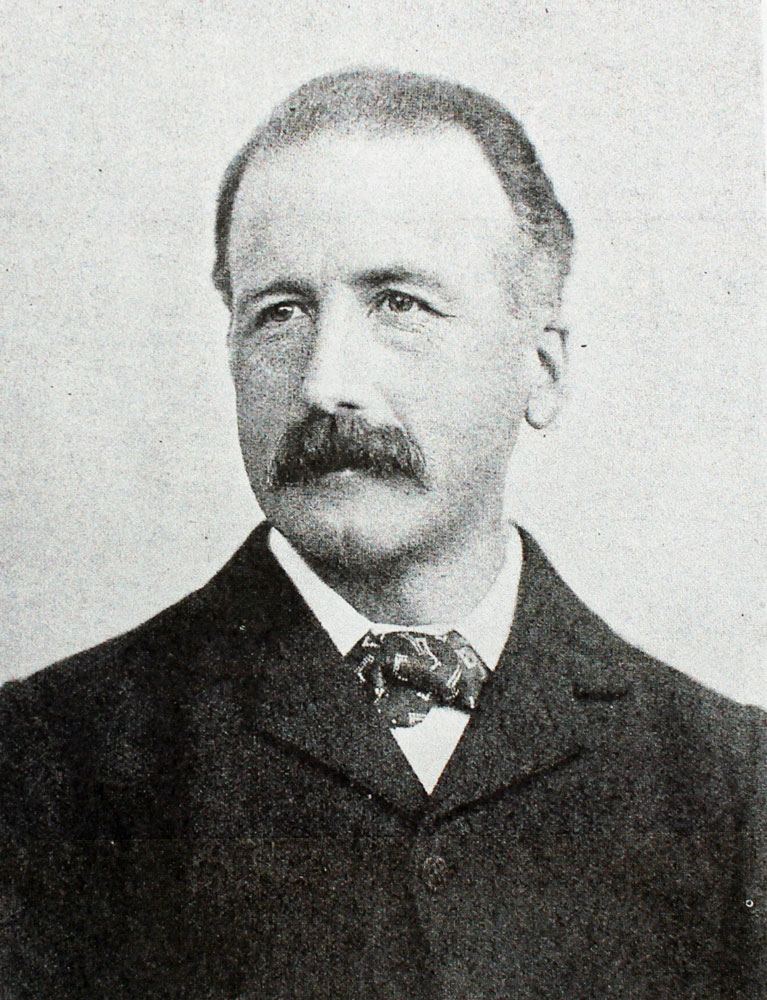
- Robert Weir Allan, c.1901
- Born: Robert Weir Allan; 1851; Glasgow, Scotland
- Died: 1942 (aged 90–91); London, England

Robert Weir Allan (1851–1942) was a Scottish-born painter known mainly for his depiction of landscape and marine subjects. He was born in Glasgow into a family that encouraged and valued his natural artistic ability. He exhibited at the Glasgow Institute of the Fine Arts when aged 22, and two years later he had a painting selected for the Royal Academy, in London. In 1875–80 he attended the Académie Julian in Paris, and he was influenced by the French school of rustic naturalism and also by French Impressionism. Working plein-air, he developed a loose, painterly approach to landscape subjects. He was a prolific artist who travelled widely in Europe, India, Japan, the Middle East and America; however, he drew particular inspiration from the north-east coast of Scotland – a subject to which he returned throughout his life. He exhibited extensively in London, Glasgow and Edinburgh, and became vice-president of the Royal Society of Painters in Water Colours. He was equally at home with oil painting, and during his lifetime he had 84 paintings selected for exhibition at the Royal Academy. For the last 60 years of his life his home was in London, and he died there at the age of 90 in 1942.

== Artistic ambitions ==
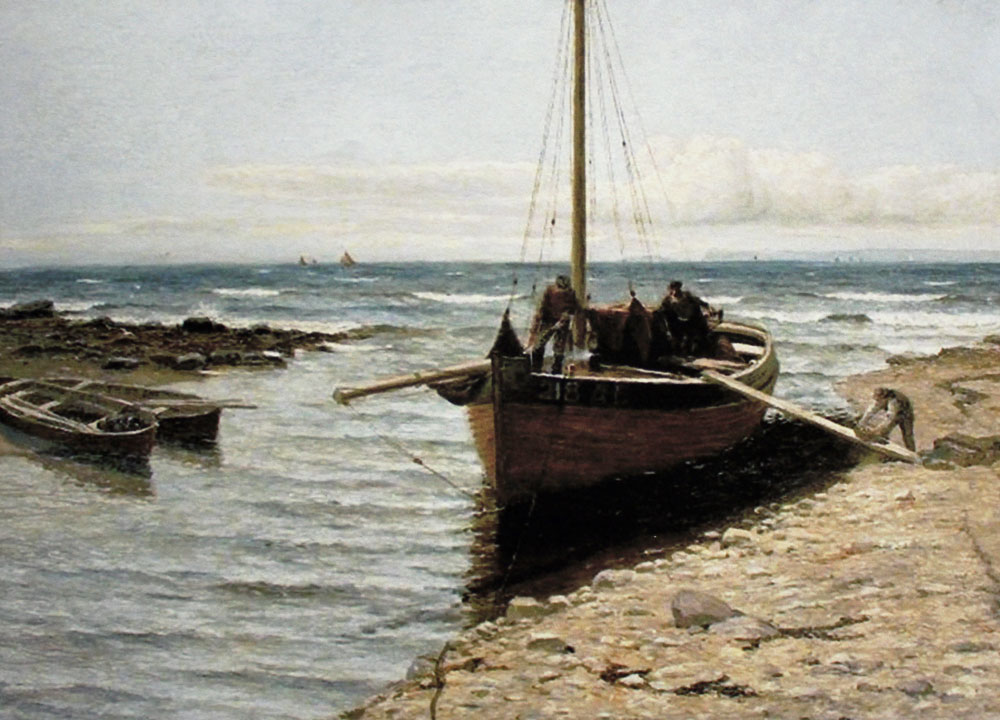
Home from the Herring Fishing, oil painting, 1876

Robert Weir Allan was born in Glasgow on 11 November 1851. In partnership with the engraver William Ferguson, his father, David Allan, had built up a successful printing and publishing business that operated from Argyll Street in the centre of the city. Robert ('Bob') was the seventh of eight children. He grew up in a household that appreciated art: his father 'dabbled a little with colours' and owned a small collection of paintings. The 1871 census shows that 'Allan and Ferguson' was very much a family business, with Catherine, Chrestina (sic – presumably Christina), John and James Allan all being 'lithographers', while Robert and his younger brother, James, were described as 'artist lithographers'.

It had been assumed by his parents that Robert would carry on the business, but 'so strong ... was Robert Allan's love of art ... that his parents wisely allowed him to follow his bent.' In 1873 his oil painting A Sunny Day at the Sea was exhibited at the Glasgow Institute of the Fine Arts, and two years later his ambition to be an artist was further fuelled with the selection of Waiting the Tide for the Royal Academy's summer exhibition in London. These seafaring subjects were executed at the time when his older brother Alexander Glassford Allan became a qualified ship's captain. Later in 1875, David Allan died, providing Robert and his siblings with a useful inheritance.

== 'Careful yet careless days' ==
Feeling the need for formal art training, Robert Allan took the bold step of moving to Paris, where he attended the Académie Julian from 1875 to 1880. The Académie was welcoming of foreign students and was regarded as a stepping stone to the prestigious Ecole des Beaux-Arts, where Allan trained under Alexandre Cabanel.

Allan hired a studio in the Boulevard d'Enfer, where his bare walls became covered with sketches and studies. The community of English-speaking fellow art students were very supportive of each other – former Slade School of Art student Arthur Bell and Belgian-British writer Nancy Meugens (later Mrs Bell) were frequent visitors. In an article in International Studio magazine, Nancy describes the 'hard-work and frugal living' of those 'careful yet careless days'. Allan had a 'deeply interesting personality, with a rare power of winning the hearts of those with whom he was brought in contact'. To keep homesickness at bay, porridge was eaten, 'a store of the wherewithal having been sent for from the northern home in a goodly sack'.

== Watercolour and plein-air work ==
As Allan would always remain a landscape painter, it is difficult to assess what he took from a training as centred on life-study classes as was that of the Académie. Mrs Bell notes that Allan's years in Paris coincided with the emergence of Jules Bastien-Lepage as the leader of the French 'rustic naturalist' plein-air movement, and it was he 'who exercised perhaps more influence on [Allan] than did any of the men under whose direct criticism he studied'. Allan was using the spontaneity of the watercolour medium for a series of plein-air studies of coastal and market views that he sent back to English and Scottish exhibitions. His bold and painterly style was inspired to some extent by the Impressionists, whose exhibitions were a cause célèbre in Paris in 1875–6.

In 1878 Allan was visited by his friend Arthur Melville, a young artist from East Lothian. Together they travelled in Normandy and Brittany, producing coastal views and rural subjects. In Paris, Melville also studied at the Académie Julian, and he stayed at Allan's studio in the Boulevard d'Enfer. Mrs Bell recalls that 'The Scotch songs sung, the wild reels danced in Mr. Allan's studio, which sometimes alarmed the natives admitted to share in the revels, kept home memories alive.' An oil portrait of Robert Allan by Arthur Melville dating from 1878 was dedicated 'A mon ami R W Allan'. Through Allan, Melville was introduced to watercolour painting and the innovative technique – which critics would describe as 'blottesque' – where blots and runs were used to suggest form.

== Making his mark ==
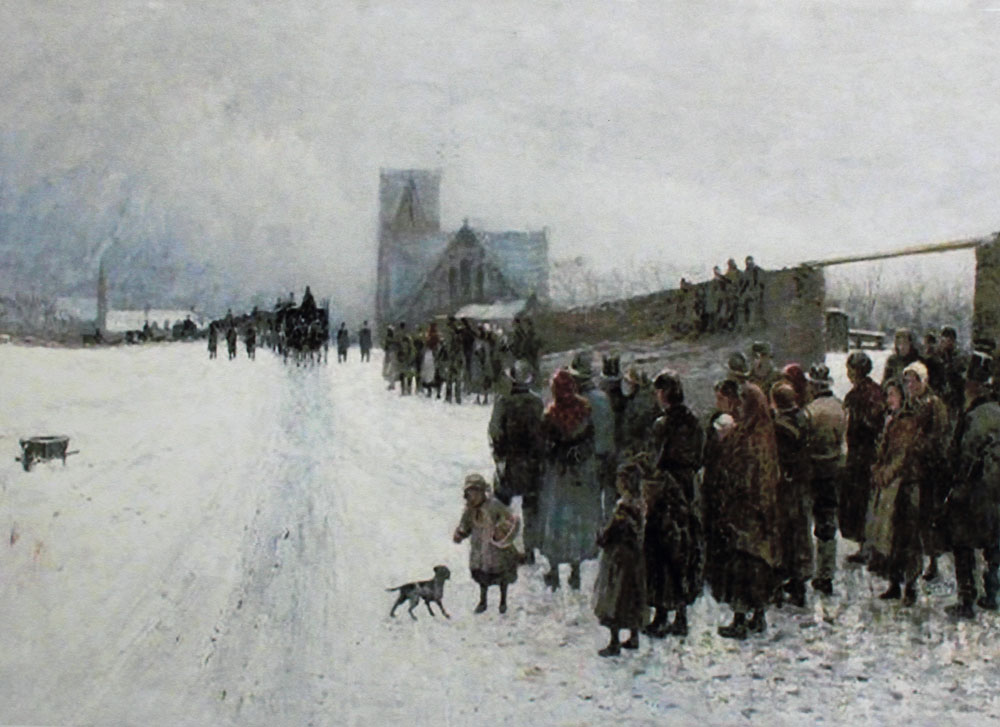
Funeral of Thomas Carlyle: the oil painting was probably completed somewhat later than the watercolour, c.1882

During the summer vacation of 1879 Robert Allan revisited Scotland – an oil painting August in Fifeshire was selected for the Royal Academy the following year, and several watercolours such as Village of Crail and Fishing Boats in a Harbour also date from this time. After completing his studies in Paris in 1880 he visited Spain, before returning to Scotland as a base, and in the autumn of that year he painted further Fife-located subjects.

Ironically, it was through a non-typical work that Allan 'made his mark outside of his immediate art-circle'. Mrs Bell explains that, 'owing to a fortunate conjunction of circumstances', Robert Allan was the only artist who witnessed the interment of the writer Thomas Carlyle, on 10 February 1881 in Ecclefechan, Dumfriesshire. His watercolour Funeral of Thomas Carlyle owes more to the French rustic naturalist school than is evident in most of his work. When it was exhibited at the Glasgow Institute in September 1881 the Galloway News described it as 'the picture of the Exhibition ... Mr. Allan ... is one of our best water-colour painters, but such a great work as this will make for him an enduring reputation in the art world. The drawing is ... an artistic trophy, worthy of our National galleries.' Perhaps in response to this suggestion, Allan worked the watercolour up as an oil painting.

== Aberdeenshire and European travel ==
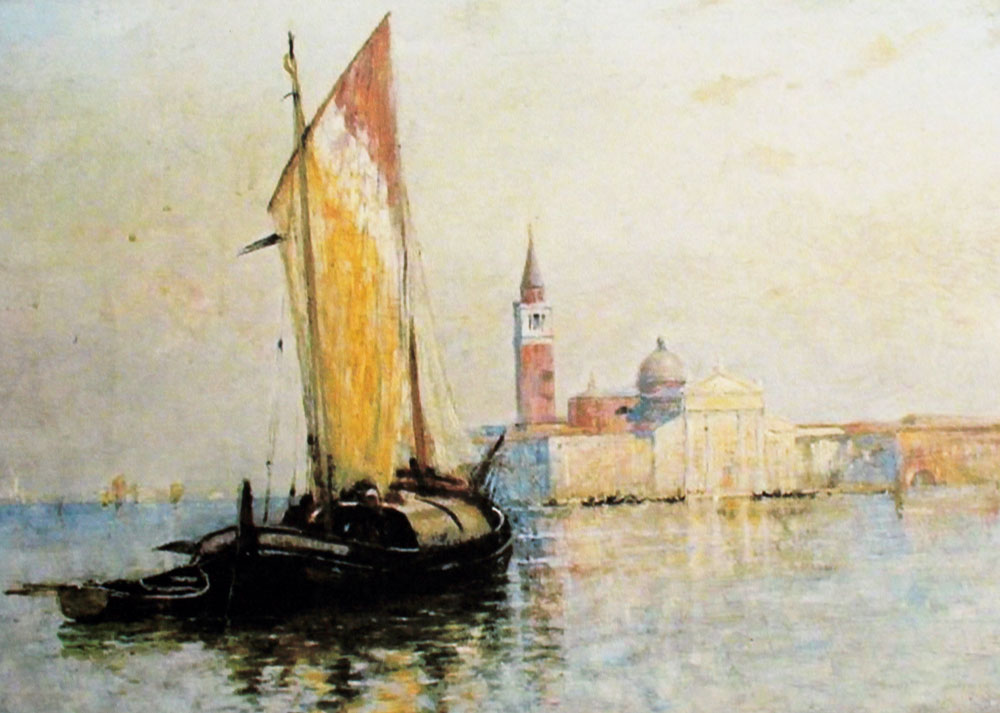
Venice with view of San Giorgio Maggiore – oil painting – date unknown

In the summer of 1881 Allan travelled up Scotland's east coast to Aberdeenshire – coastal views of this area would become his archetypical subjects. A later article in a local newspaper, 'Tribute from Fraserburgh', explains: 'For this particular locality no painter has done so much as has Robert W. Allan. Coming here some 28 years ago [c.1881], he was fascinated by the grey skies, the ever-toiling sea with its burden of hardy fishermen in their brown and purple boats – a charm that has never left him ... there is no truer or loftier exponent or interpreter of our East Coast scenery than is to be found in this charming artist.'

Allan was a prolific, hard-working and popular artist. He travelled widely in Europe, and brought back watercolours that often included recognisable locations such as the Doge's Palace, Venice; Notre-Dame, Paris; and Dutch canal views while avoiding cliché. His work was widely exhibited, sold well, and received encouraging press notices. 'Southwark Bridge, London ... with barges in the foreground, [is] diffused with fine colour against a soft grey sky, full of atmosphere and fine quality, such as no other picture in the exhibition shows,' one reviewer commented.

In 1883 Allan took a studio in Haverstock Hill, Hampstead, and would make London his base for the rest his life – placing him in the centre of the British art world while also giving him access to Scotland through the rapidly developing railway routes.

== In the heart of the city ==
In the mid-1880s Allan was living in a two-room flat on the third floor of 27 Piccadilly in the heart of London's art world. Allan used his proximity to London's exhibiting societies to exhibit widely: with the Royal Institute of Painters in Water Colours (RI), which had just moved into new exhibiting galleries on Piccadilly; the Royal Society of Painters in Water Colours (RWS) – also known as the Old Water-Colour Society – whose headquarters were in Pall Mall and whose exhibitions were held at the Egyptian Hall, Piccadilly; the Society of British Artists (SBA), which exhibited in Suffolk Street (just off Pall Mall); and the Royal Academy, at Burlington House, Piccadilly. In reviewing a SBA exhibition at Suffolk Street in 1883, the Dundee Advertiser singled out Robert Allan and Arthur Melville as Scottish artists 'of note'. Commenting on Arriving from the Herring Fishing, it declared, 'Allan has won a position for himself in England more easily and more rapidly perhaps than any other young Scottish artist. His Continental studies prepared him for a thorough interpretation of the marine scenery on the east coast of Scotland, and he has wrought up this subject with great success.

== 'A French orientation' ==
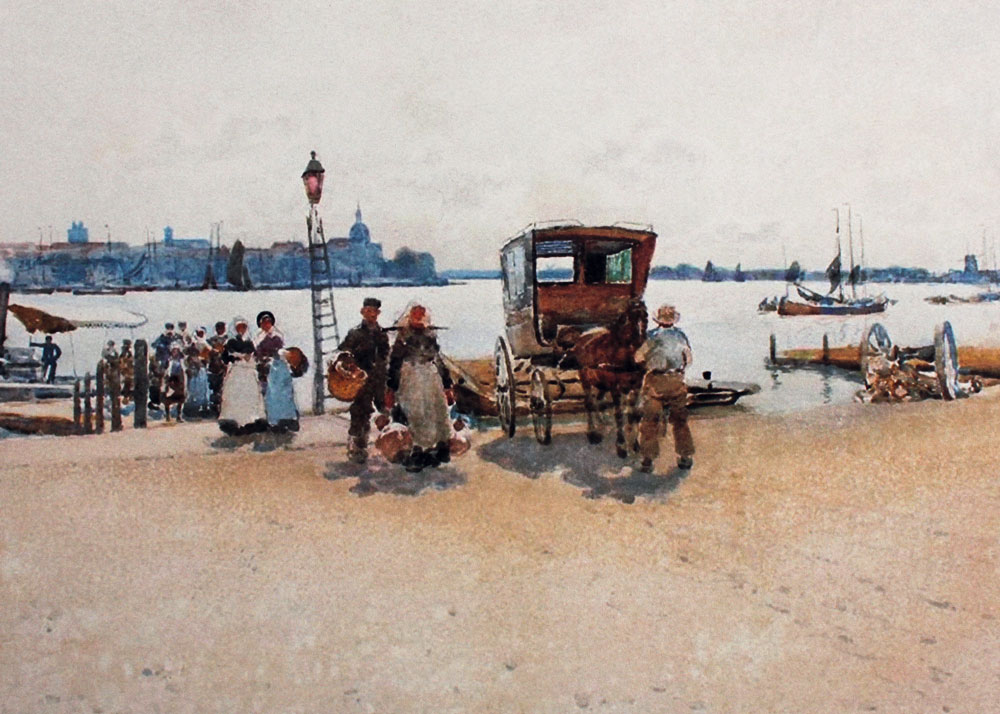
Arriving From the Ferry water-colour painting with a view of Dordrecht (Holland),1888

Despite resistance from the London art establishment, painting in the progressive French manner was starting to percolate through exhibitions at the Grosvenor Gallery and the New English Art Club (founded in 1886). The Royal Society of Painters in Water Colours gave a 'nod to impressionism' by electing Robert Allan an associate in 1887 (and Arthur Melville in 1888). 'Though not an impressionist, Allan did share with his compatriots a taste for plein-air painting and a French orientation.' The Queen's Jubilee Procession of 1887 is praised by Mrs Bell for 'the artist's bold brush-work, ... and his various Dutch scenes, notably his Lowlands of Holland [of c.1889], are perhaps especially remarkable for increased freedom of handling, and for the nearest approach made by their gifted author to what may be called the earlier phase of Impressionism.'The Dundee Courier also noted that The Lowlands of Holland at the Glasgow Institute in 1890 was 'a very distinct advance'.

Allan maintained an individualistic approach to his art, aligning himself neither with British Impressionists nor with the Glasgow School, which was 'fast coming to be recognised as a new force and power, especially in the landscape art of the country'. The 'Glasgow School' – retrospectively known as the 'Glasgow Boys' – was a diverse grouping of artists including James Paterson (1854–1932), William York Macgregor (1855–1923), James Guthrie (1859–1930), John Lavery (1856–1941) and Thomas Millie Dow (1848–1919). Mrs. Bell's International Studio article draws on conversations with Allan in which he makes it clear that he 'was not, as is so often taken for granted, a member of the Glasgow School'.

In 1889 he was awarded a silver medal at the Exposition Universelle in Paris.

== Young India ==
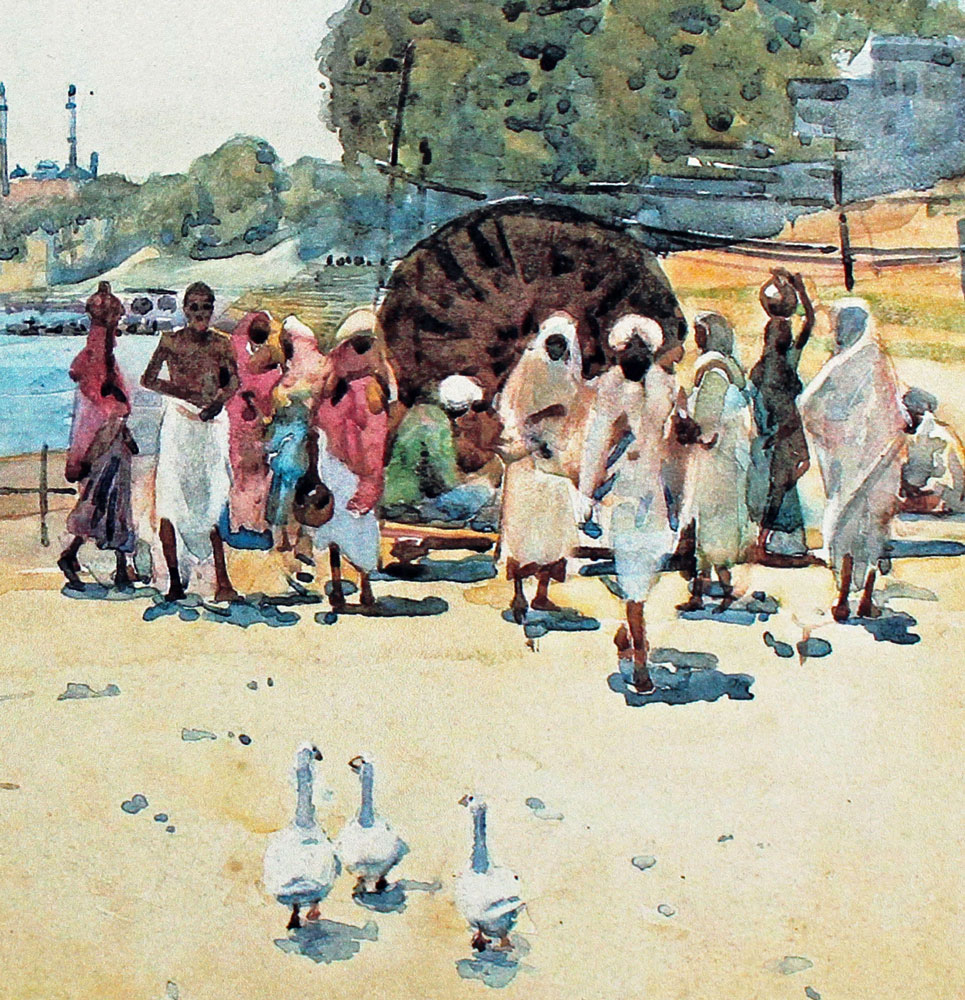
The Ghats at Benares (detail), 1891

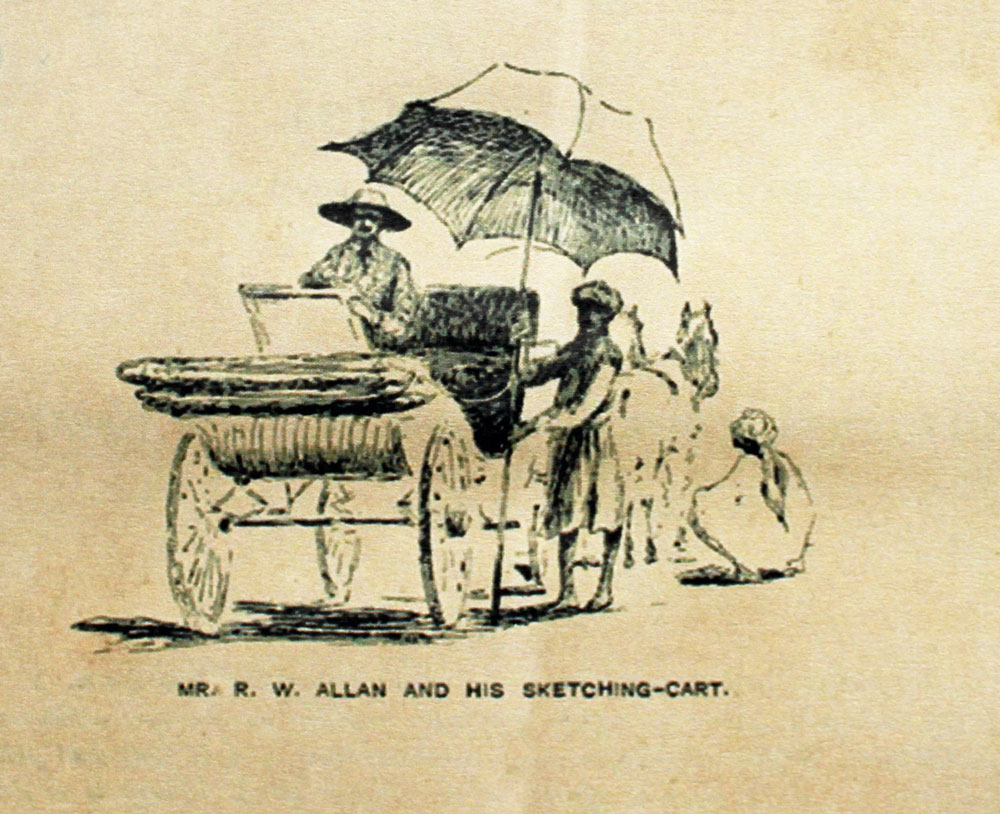
'Mr R.W. Allan and his sketching-cart', published in Young India in 1891

Inspired perhaps by the success of Arthur Melville's watercolour paintings of oriental subjects, in the winter of 1890–91 Allan embarked on a long trip to India with his friend the politician and temperance advocate William Sproston Caine, who was undertaking a political tour of that country. Allan had been invited to contribute watercolour illustrations for a publication that would be entitled 'Young India'. On return, he exhibited the watercolours Service in a Sikh Temple, The Street in Delhi, The Water Carriers of Gwalior and Oudeypore at the Royal Society of Painters in Water Colours winter exhibition. The Glasgow Herald considered that 'Mr. Robert W. Allan's work is as strong as it has ever been, and more brilliant in colour ... there is nothing more to be said than that even Mr Allan has never done better work.' Oudeypore was worked up as an oil painting and exhibited at the Royal Academy in 1892. By this time Allan was living at 2 Spenser Street, Victoria.

== Consolidating his reputation ==
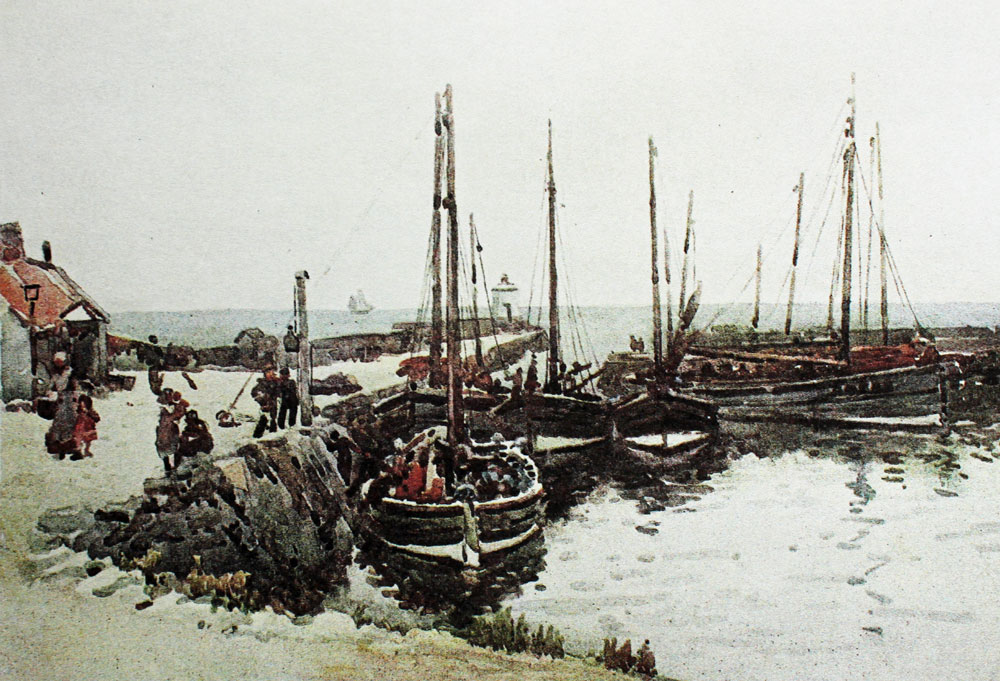
Rosehearty, Aberdeenshire, water-colour painting c.1905

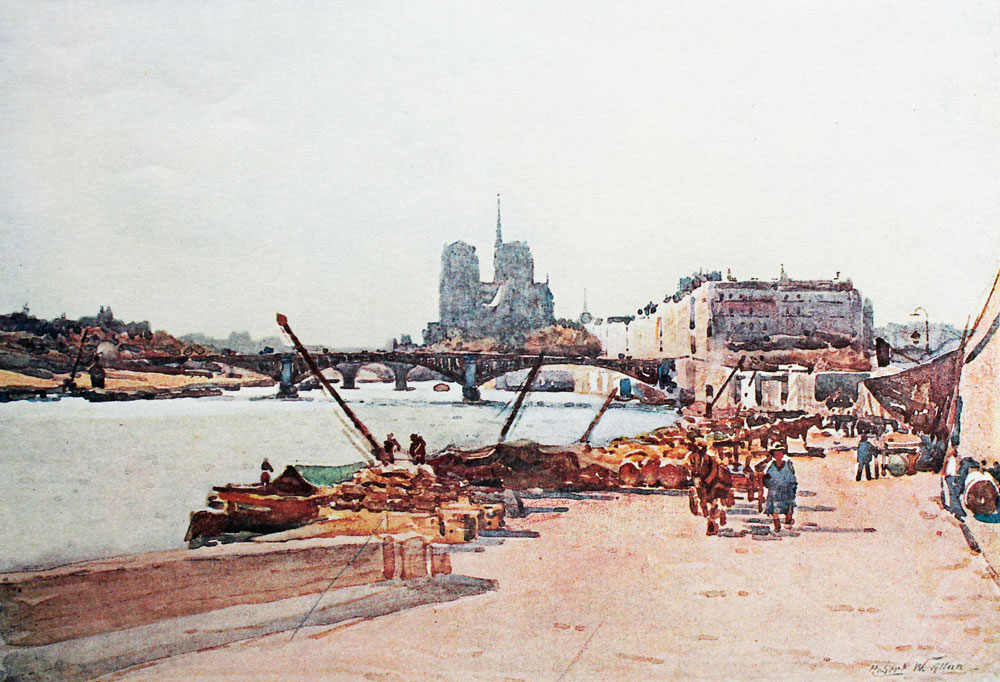
Paris water-colour painting 1905

Through the Royal Anglo-Australian Society of Artists, a watercolour Arriving from the Ferry was purchased for the Art Gallery of New South Wales in Sydney in 1890, and in the same year an oil painting Kirkwall, Orkney was purchased by public subscription for Dunedin Public Art Gallery in New Zealand. Critics were now more accepting of his 'vivid modernity of style', despite its seeming 'oddly out of place in Pall Mall East. Of the excellence of his drawings, however, there can be no possible shadow of doubt. Best of them all, perhaps, is his Montrose (No. 22), a most convincing view of what one feels that cold, grey Scottish town must be like on a hopelessly sloppy day.' The following year he was made a full member of the Royal Society of Painters in Water Colours.

Allan seems to have now been equally at home with oil painting, and each year for the next three decades (with few exceptions) he would have at least one oil painting selected for the Royal Academy summer exhibition. The subjects were largely of the Aberdeenshire coast, such as Ford between North Uist and Benbecula exhibited at the RA in 1894 and purchased four years later by Aberdeen Corporation for £600. In 1900 All Hands on Deck received an 'honourable mention' at the Carnegie Institute, Pittsburgh, and Allan was then invited to serve on the jury for a future Carnegie Institute exhibition.

== An elder statesman ==
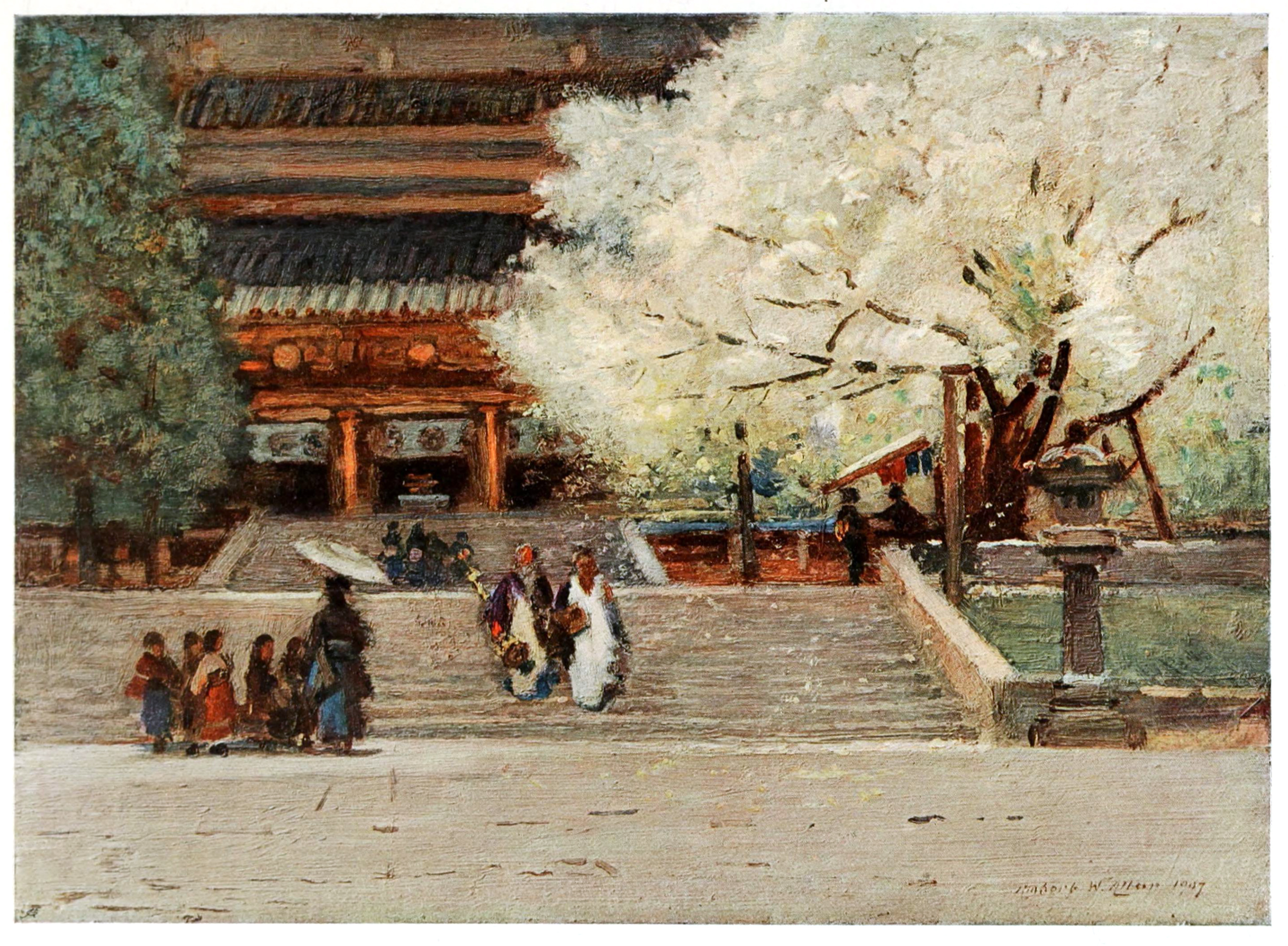
Temple at Nikko, Japan oil painting from 1907

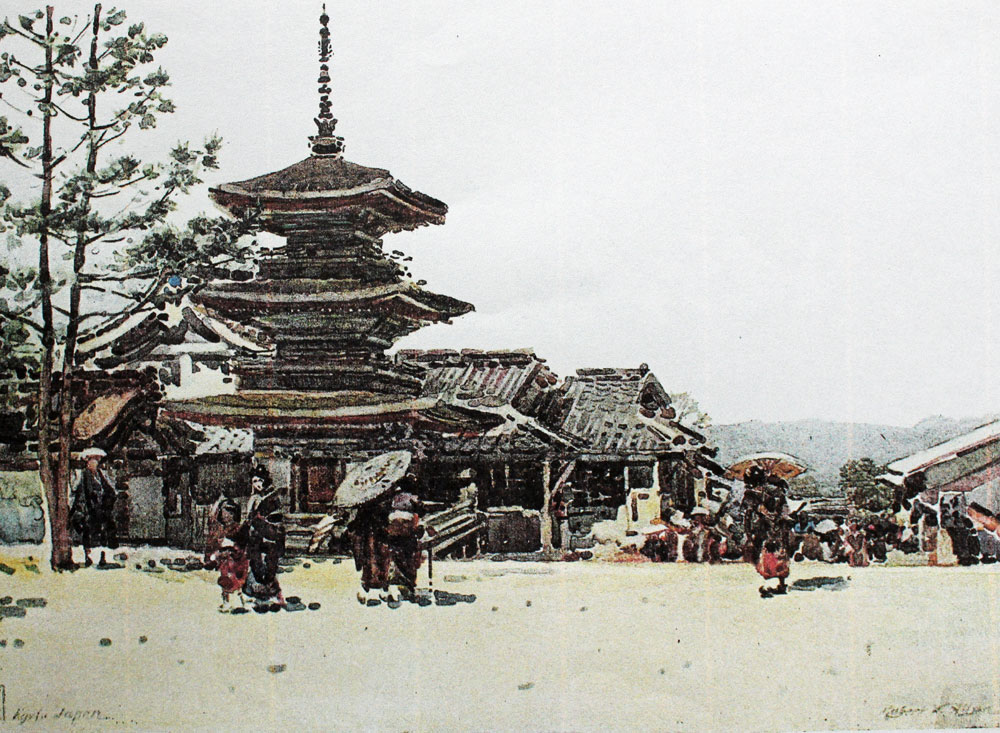
Yasaka Pagoda, Kyoto watercolour, 1907

In his fifties, Allan became something of an elder statesman within the London art scene. He had moved to 62 Buckingham Gate, Westminster, and received the accolade of two high-profile articles in International Studio magazine. He became vice-president of the Royal Society of Painters in Water Colours in 1908, and the society seems to have commissioned his portrait from Dorothea Landau (1881–1941). In 1910 he was vice-president of the Royal British Colonial Society of Artists. He also played a prominent role in the annual landscape exhibitions of the Royal Society of Painters in Water Colours. He maintained his extensive travel itinerary, including a most productive visit to Japan in 1907. Five watercolours from this visit were included in the Royal Society of Painters in Water Colours exhibition in November 1907, when it was declared that Yameiman Gate, Nikko was 'fittingly placed as a centrepiece, for its merit justifies this.'

== A late marriage ==
It would no doubt have been a talking point among his colleagues and friends that in January 1911, at the age of 59, Allan married a young American woman, Georgiana Emily Trumbull, aged 27, from Ithaca, New York State. It seems likely that the couple had met while Georgiana was on an extensive cultural tour of Europe between 1907 and 1910. The Ithaca Daily Journal of 19 January 1910 noted, ‘She has been away for about two years and a half and has visited nearly every country on the continent and in England.' She returned to her parents' home, but her plans to become a kindergarten teacher in Ithaca were put aside, and in the following January she married Robert Allan in London and the couple were living at Buckingham Gate.

In 1911–12 Allan embarked on an extensive tour that took in North Africa, Damascus and other Middle Eastern destinations. Given Georgiana's interest in foreign travel, this may have been planned as a honeymoon trip. Perhaps preparing the ground for a forthcoming visit to his new in-laws, an illustrated article on Robert Allan's paintings, with an accompanying specially commissioned portrait of the artist, appeared in the Christian Science Monitor, published in Boston, in early 1913. Later in Britain there were one-man shows of his work in Glasgow and Birmingham. Despite the outbreak of the First World War, a visit to America – presumably to visit Georgiana's family – went ahead. Records show Robert and Georgiana Allan returning from New York to Liverpool on the Cunard luxury liner RMS Lusitania on 6 March 1915. This would be its last completed return journey to the UK, as it was sunk by a German U-boat on 7 May 1915.

== The inter-war years ==
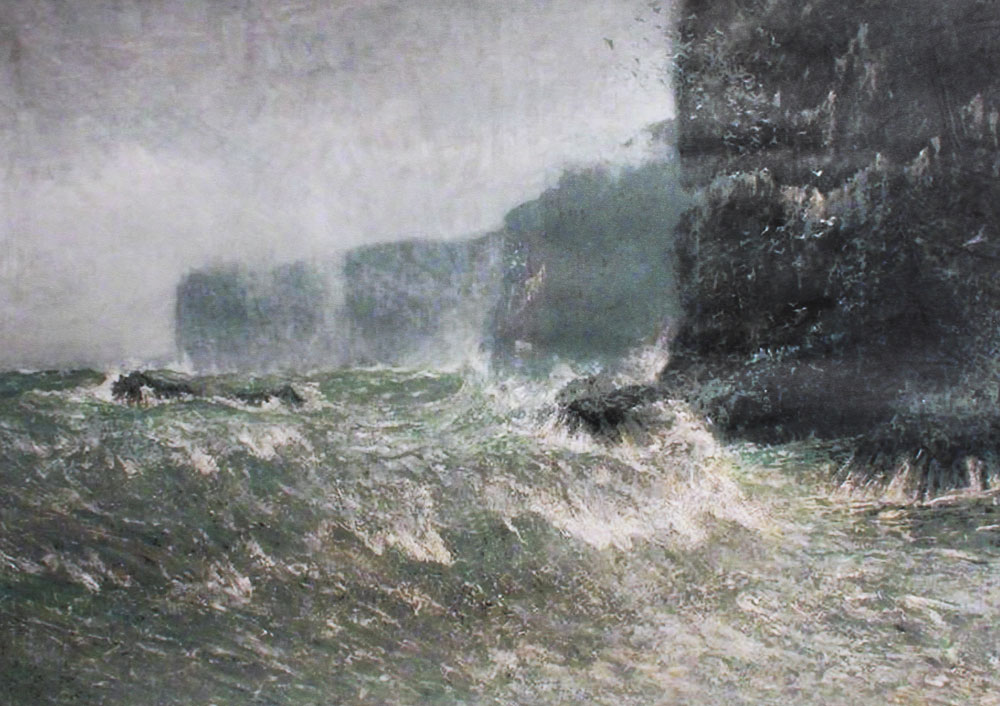
North-Eastern Gale, oil painting, date unknown

After the war, paintings evidence visits to France, Holland, Italy and Greece, and there were further visits to the USA. The Syracuse Journal of 1 November 1920 notes that 'Robert Weir Allan, the eminent British artist, is spending a few days in the city at the home of [Georgiana's brother] Charles D. Trumbull. Mr. Allan and his wife have been in this country for some months visiting the West and are about to return to their home in London, England.'

Allan continued exhibiting at the Royal Academy throughout the 1920s and even in the 1930s when in his eighties. The pictures shown were largely coastal views of the Aberdeenshire area that he knew so well, and it seems less likely that he would have been working plein-air. One of his most powerful later oil paintings, North-Easter Gale, effectively reduces the composition to sea and sky. The only record of a portrait painting by Allan is a self-portrait presented by the artist in 1935 to the Scottish National Portrait Gallery, Edinburgh. The last work Allan exhibited at the RA was in 1935; it had a characteristic and fitting title – Home from the Sea.

Although passenger lists show the Allans travelling together as a couple as late as 1929, by the mid-1930s the couple seem to have separated. In June 1936 Georgiana travelled from New York to London (via Liverpool) and stayed in a hotel in Pall Mall. The USA is given as her country of permanent residence. She was still in London the following year, when she attended a garden party in St James's Square held by the Royal Institute of International Affairs. It is possible that her presence in London then was required for a pending divorce, as on 11 August 1941 she remarried in Maine, USA, under her maiden name, Georgiana Trumbull. Her second husband, Dutch-born Hendrik Jan De Lange (1886–1961), was a prominent Christian Scientist who had been living in America since the mid-1930s.

== Legacy ==
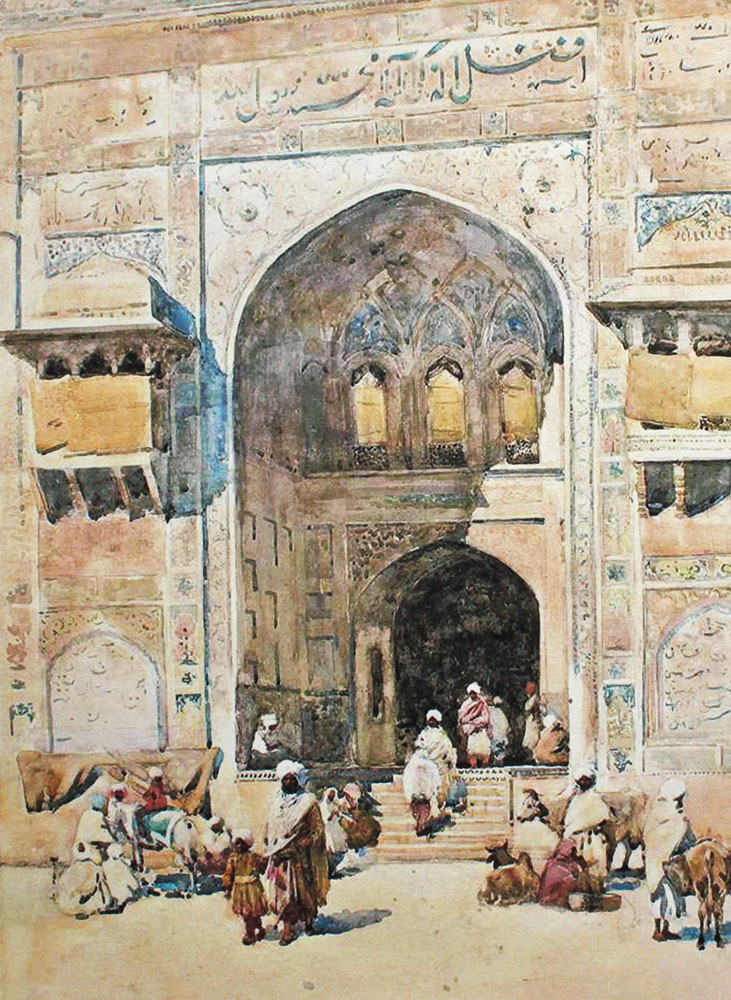
Figures on the steps of the Masjid Wazir Khan Lahore watercolour, 1891

The Westminster area, where Allan lived with a housekeeper and an unpaid servant, was subject to heavy bombing in the early years of the Second World War. The ‘1939 Register’ shows a shop assistant and a worker from a biscuit factory sharing his accommodation at Buckingham Gate. These may have been people relocated in response to the military situation.

On the night of 27 May 1942 Allan collapsed in his London home and was taken to Westminster Hospital, where he was found to be dead – he was 90 years of age. His estate was worth nearly £5,000 (equivalent to about £237,000 in 2019) and was left in the hands of a solicitor. He bequeathed three oil paintings to Glasgow Museums – their collection already included the oil painting of Funeral of Thomas Carlyle, gifted by Allan in 1911, and they had purchased Sheltered from the Stormy Sea in 1904. Two watercolours were bequeathed to the Victoria & Albert Museum in London. In 1943 in Glasgow there was a sale of an 'interesting collection of pictures and etchings by Robert W. Allan' – presumably connected to the liquidation of his assets. Currently (May 2020) the Art UK website lists 36 oil paintings by Allan in public collections, including Birmingham Museums Trust; Victoria Art Gallery, Bath; The Fleming Collection, London; Walker Art Gallery, Liverpool; Nuneaton Museum and Art Gallery; Windsor & Royal Borough Museum; Sheffield Museums; Aberdeen Art Gallery & Museums; Dunedin Public Art Gallery New Zealand; Summerlee, Museum of Scottish Industrial Life, North Lanarkshire; Ferens Art Gallery, Hull: and Manchester Art Gallery.
