= Thomas Allan (mineralogist) =

British mineralogist

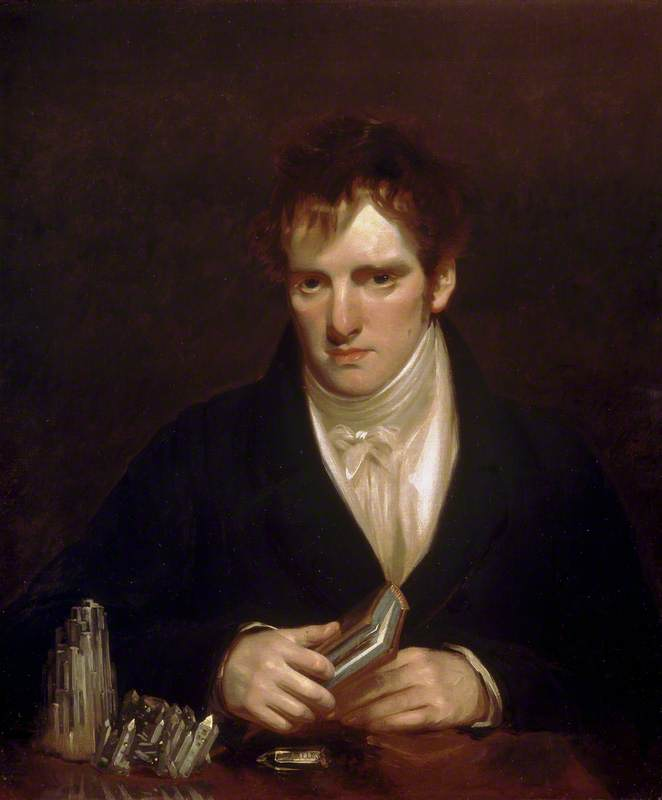
- Portrait of Thomas Allan by John Watson Gordon, c.1824
- Born: July 17, 1777; Edinburgh, Scotland
- Died: September 12, 1833 (aged 56); Linden Hall at Morpeth, Northumberland, England
- Burial place: St Cuthbert's Church, Edinburgh
- Occupation: mineralogist

Thomas Allan of Lauriston FRS FRSE FSA FLS (17 July 1777 – 12 September 1833) was a British mineralogist.

== Life ==
Allan was born in Edinburgh, Scotland, on 17 July 1777, the son of Robert Allan (1748–1818), a banker. He was educated at the High School of Edinburgh and took up banking as profession, but he is remembered today for his contributions to mineral science.

At an early age, Allan became fascinated with minerals, and he began to accumulate a large mineral collection that was subsequently bequeathed to his son Robert Allan FRSE. This collection was later incorporated into Robert Greg's, which was ultimately acquired by the British Museum of Natural History in the mid-19th century.

In 1813, Allan was influential in securing a mineralogy post in the Dublin Philosophical Society for German mineralogist Karl Ludwig Giesecke (1761–1833). Allan was elected as Fellow of the Royal Society of Edinburgh in 1805, his proposers being Sir James Hall, William Wright, and John Playfair. He was elected a Fellow of the Royal Society of London in 1815. He was elected a Fellow to the Linnean Society of London on 3 March, 1812, on the recommendations of W. Elford Leach, R. Maughan and P. Walker. He served as curator to the RSE 1812–20 and treasurer 1821–33.

In 1810, his contribution to mineralogy was acknowledged with a new mineral species from Greenland, being named "allanite" in his honour by Thomas Thomson.

His Edinburgh address in later life was 11 Royal Exchange.

Allan died at Linden Hall at Morpeth, Northumberland, England, on 12 September 1833. He is buried in St Cuthberts Churchyard in Edinburgh. His son, Robert Allan (1806–1863) was also a mineralogist.

== Works ==
Allan contributed the "Diamond" article for the fifth edition of the Encyclopædia Britannica and the work on mineralogical nomenclature An Alphabetical List of the Names of Minerals, at Present Most Familiar in the English, French, and German Languages, with Tables of Analyses (Edinburgh, 1805, followed by enlarged editions in 1808, 1814, and 1819).
