= Jamie Allan =

Jamie Allan may refer to:

- Jamie Allan (golfer)
- Jamie Allan (magician)

== See also ==
- Jamie Allen (disambiguation)
- James Allan (disambiguation)
