= James Allen =

James, Jim, or Jimmy Allen may refer to:

== Academics ==
- James Allen (educator) (1683–1746), English educationalist
- James E. Allen Jr. (1911–1971), American education commissioner
- James Vincent Allen (born 1959), Canadian philosopher
- James Peter Allen (born 1945), American Egyptologist

== Arts and entertainment ==
- James C. Allen (engraver) (1790–1833), English engraver
- James Baylis Allen (1803–1876), English line-engraver
- James Lane Allen (1849–1925), American novelist
- James Allen (author) (1864–1912), English poet and motivational writer
- James E. Allen (artist) (1894–1964), American illustrator, printmaker, and painter
- James Latimer Allen (1907–1977), American photographer and portraitist
- Jim Allen (artist) (1922–2023), New Zealand visual artist
- Jim Allen (playwright) (1926–1999), English playwright
- James H. Allen (1928–2015), American children's television actor
- Jimmie Allen (born 1985), American country singer
- Jimmy Allen (musician), American rock musician

== Business and industry ==
- James Mountford Allen (1809–1883), British architect
- James L. Allen (1904–1992), American businessman
- James F. Allen (businessman) (born 1960), American businessman

== Law and politics ==
- James Allen (Virginia politician) (1802–1854), American politician in Virginia
- James C. Allen (1822–1912), U.S. representative from Illinois
- James M. Allen, American politician in Illinois
- James P. Allen (politician) (1848–1922), American politician in Oklahoma and Mississippi
- James Allen (New Zealand politician) (1855–1942)
- James Allen (Alabama politician) (1912–1978), U.S. senator from Alabama
- Jim L. Allen (1934–2003), American politician in Kansas
- Jim Allen (Wyoming politician) (born 1952), American politician in Wyoming

== Military ==
- James Allen (Army engineer) (1806–1846), American army officer
- James Allen (Medal of Honor) (1843–1913), Irish-born American soldier
- James R. Allen (1925–1992), American air force general
- James Allen da Luz (1938–1973), Brazilian guerrilla

== Religion ==
- James Allen (priest, born 1734) (1734-1804), Scottish priest in Gayle
- James Allen (priest, born 1802) (1802–1897), English Anglican clergyman
- James Allen (priest, born 1805) (1805–1880), Irish Anglican priest
- Jimmy Allen (pastor) (1927–2019), American Southern Baptist pastor
- James B. Allen (historian) (1927–2024), American Mormon historian

== Science and medicine ==
- James Allen (nurseryman) (1830–1906), English horticulturalist
- James Van Allen (1914–2006), American space scientist
- Jim Allen (archaeologist) (1938–2025), Australian archaeologist
- James F. Allen (computer scientist) (born 1950), American computational linguist

== Sports ==
=== American football ===
- Jimmy Allen (American football) (1952–2019), American football player
- James Allen (running back) (born 1975), American football running back
- James Allen (linebacker) (born 1979), American football linebacker

=== Other sports ===
- James Allen (cricketer) (1881–1958), English cricketer
- Jimmy Allen (footballer, born 1909) (1909–1995), English footballer
- Jim Allen (footballer) (1912–1972), Australian rules footballer
- Jimmy Allen (footballer, born 1913) (1913–1979), English footballer
- Jim Allen (hurdler) (born 1941), American track and field athlete
- Jim Allen (cricketer) (born 1951), Montserratian cricketer
- James Allen (journalist) (born 1966), British motor sports journalist
- Jimmy Allen (basketball) (born 1971), American basketball coach
- James Allen (racing driver) (born 1996), Australian racing driver
- Jamie Allen (baseball) (James Bradley Allen, born 1958), American former Major League Baseball player
- James Heywood Allen (1881–1958), American sports promoter

== Others ==
- James Allen (newspaperman) (1806–1886), English-born journalist in Australia and New Zealand
- James Allen (highwayman) (1809–1837), American criminal
- James S. Allen (1906–1986), American Communist activist
- James Allen (collector) (born 1954), American antique collector

== Other uses ==
- James Allen's Girls' School, a private school in Dulwich, South London, England

== See also ==
- Jamie Allen (disambiguation)
- James Allan (disambiguation)
- Allen (surname)
