= Jamie Allen =

Jamie Allen may refer to:

- Jamie Allen (baseball) (born 1958), American former Major League Baseball player
- Jamie Allen (priest) (born 1971), Anglican priest from England
- Jamie Allen (footballer, born January 1995), English football midfielder
- Jamie Allen (footballer, born May 1995), English football forward

== See also ==
- James Allen (disambiguation)
