= Jim Allan (disambiguation) =

Jim Allan is a New Zealand and Australian curler.

Jim Allan may also refer to:

- Jim Allan (singer), American singer ("Why Don't You Believe Me?")
- Jim Allan (editor), Canadian editor (An Introduction To Elvish); see Languages of Arda

== See also ==
- James Allan (disambiguation)
- Jimmy Allan (disambiguation)
- James Allen (disambiguation)
