= Jimmy Allan =

Jimmy Allan may refer to:

- Jimmy Allan (cricketer) (1932–2005), Scottish first-class cricketer
- Jimmy Allan (footballer, born 1896) (1896–1982), Scottish football player and manager (Dundee United)
- Jimmy Allan (footballer, born 1953), Scottish footballer (Swindon Town)

== See also ==
- Jim Allan (disambiguation)
- James Allan (disambiguation)
- James Allen (disambiguation), including Jimmy Allen
- Jimmie Allen, American country singer
