= Luca Bish =

English television personality (born 1999)

- Born: Luca Laurence Bish; 14 May 1999 (age 26); Brighton, England
- Occupation: Television personality
- Years active: 2022–present
- Known for: Love Island; Celebrity MasterChef; Love Island: All Stars

Luca Laurence Bish (born 14 May 1999) is an English television personality. In 2022, he appeared as a contestant on the eighth series of the ITV2 dating show Love Island. He subsequently went on to appear in Celebrity MasterChef in 2023 and the second series of Love Island: All Stars in 2025.

== Life and career ==
Luca Laurence Bish was born on 14 May 1999 in Brighton, England. He is a part time fishmonger. His family own several businesses including MCB Seafoods. In 2022, he entered the Love Island villa to appear as a contestant on the eighth series. During the series, he coupled up with Paige Thorne and Danica Taylor respectively, however he reached the final alongside Gemma Owen and the pair finished as runners-up. They were in a relationship for several months, however announced their split in November 2022. In December 2022, he appeared alongside several of his Love Island co-stars in Britain Get Singing.

In 2023, Bish appeared as a contestant on the eighteenth series of Celebrity MasterChef. He reached the final and finished runner-up alongside Amy Walsh, behind Wynne Evans. Bish was due to appear in a Celebrity MasterChef: Christmas Cook-Off episode in December 2024, however it was shelved by the BBC due to allegations of misconduct against judge Gregg Wallace. In 2025, it was announced that Bish would return to Love Island to appear as a contestant on the second series of Love Island: All Stars. He finished as runner up with Grace Jackson who were the bookies favourite to win and the pair started dating.

== Filmography ==
As himself
Year	Title	Notes	Ref.
2022	Love Island	Contestant; series 8	
2022	Soccer AM	Guest; 1 episode	
2022	Britain Get Singing	Participant	
2023	Celebrity MasterChef	Contestant; series 18	
2025	Love Island: All Stars	Contestant; series 2	
