= An Island Parish =

- Country of origin: United Kingdom
- Original language: English
- No. of series: 12
- No. of episodes: 177

Production
- Running time: 30 minutes
- Production company: Tiger Aspect Productions

Original release
- Network: BBC Two
- Release: 15 January 2007 – 23 February 2018

Related
- A Seaside Parish

An Island Parish is a British television documentary made by Tiger Aspect Productions for BBC Two. Series 1 and 2 covered the lives of residents of the Church of England parish of the Isles of Scilly. These series were supported by the Diocese of Truro. They followed A Seaside Parish, which covered the work of the Reverend Christine Musser in the parish of Boscastle in Cornwall, and also A Country Parish before that. Series 3 and 4 looked particularly at the work of the Methodist Church on the Isles of Scilly, as seen through the eyes of the local minister, the Revd David Easton.

Series 5 moved north and followed Fr John Paul in his first year as the Roman Catholic priest at Castlebay on the island of Barra, the second southernmost inhabited island in the Outer Hebrides (after Vatersay, to which it is linked by the Vatersay Causeway). Series 6 was filmed on Barra by Tiger Aspect Productions during 2011 and aired in early 2012, while series seven began in late 2012 and follows the Anglican priest and Methodist minister on Sark.

Series 7 and 8 (2013 and 2014 respectively) remained on Sark, while Series 9 and 10(2015) focuses on the Falkland Islands. The eleventh series is set in The Shetland Islands, broadcast in March and April 2016. The twelfth series, broadcast from January 2017, focuses on Anguilla.

== Episodes ==
=== First series ===
The first series, in eight parts, focused on life in the Isles of Scilly and aired in January 2007. It followed the Bishop of Truro, Bill Ind, known as "Bishop Bill"', as he searched for the right person to become the new chaplain to the islands. After much soul-searching, the Reverend Guy Scott decided to leave his parish in Mullion on the mainland in Cornwall and apply for the position. The series subsequently followed his eventual arrival on the islands with his family and the difficulties he has faced in adjusting to island life. It also followed the fortunes of islands police force Summer Attachment, PC Nikki Green, local fishermen Martin and Joel Bond and the veterinarian who left the Isles, Rik Barrowman.

| # | Title | Original release date | Production code |
|---|---|---|---|
| 1 | "Episode One" | 8 January 2007 | TBA |
Chronicle of life in the parish of the Isles of Scilly. The islanders are without their spiritual leader and Bishop Bill is struggling to fill the vacancy.
| 2 | "Episode Two" | 15 January 2007 | TBA |
Father Guy Scott's parishioners turn on him in anger when they learn he wants to leave and become the new chaplain to the Isles of Scilly, England's remotest parish way out in the Atlantic ocean.
| 3 | "Episode Three" | 22 January 2007 | TBA |
Chronicle of life in the parish of the Isles of Scilly. The newly appointed chaplain, Father Guy, arrives for a whistle-stop tour, carrying a secret the islanders know nothing of.
| 4 | "Episode Four" | 29 January 2007 | TBA |
Father Guy has a big task ahead to convince his family he has made the right decision about the move to the Isles of Scilly. Meanwhile Martin the trawlerman is having a tough time with his new net.
| 5 | "Episode Five" | 5 February 2007 | TBA |
At last a solution may be in sight to the crisis caused by the lack of a vet on Scilly. Plus, Father Guy has a final briefing with Bishop Bill about his long-awaited move to the islands.
| 6 | "Episode Six" | 12 February 2007 | TBA |
After a tearful farewell in his old mainland parish, Father Guy and the family at last arrive to begin their new lives on Scilly – despite appalling weather.
| 7 | "Episode Seven" | 19 February 2007 | TBA |
On the Isles of Scilly, Father Guy is growing increasingly nervous about taking his first church service in a community so wary of strangers and newcomers.
| 8 | "Episode Eight" | 26 February 2007 | TBA |
The big moment has at last arrived for the islanders – formally to welcome their nervous new priest, Father Guy. But how will he cope with such an unusual job?

=== Second series ===
Following the success of the first series the BBC commissioned a second series of twelve weekly episodes, which were first broadcast on 8 January 2008. The series looked at various aspects of island life including gig racing, employment prospects for the young, tourism and different ways for islanders to increase income, as well as the daily life of the Reverend Guy Scott and other figures on the islands, including PC Nikki Green, the award-winning baker Toby Tobin-Dougan, the Seven Stones pub's new head chef, Paulie Websdale, and the new veterinarian, Heike Dorn. The series also featured Radio Scilly and the station's first day on air, 3 September 2007.

| # | Title | Original release date | Production code |
|---|---|---|---|
| 1 | "Episode One" | 8 January 2008 | TBA |
In the first of the new series set on the Isles of Scilly the new chaplain, Father Guy Scott, attempts to get to know his new parish. He meets Toby the baker who is borrowing every penny he can to take over a pub with one of the most beautiful views in the West Country; Heike the vet, who is gambling on a new lifetime companion; and the legendary island boatman Fraser Hicks, who looks like missing the critical start to the new holiday season.
| 2 | "Episode Two" | 15 January 2008 | TBA |
On the Isles of Scilly, Toby faces a crisis over his plans to buy one of the remotest pubs in England. Sam and Laura begin a new life in their home on St Agnes, the first house to be built on the island for over 20 years; and newcomer Leo the bull-terrier faces deportation after incurring the wrath of the islanders in a dog fight.
| 3 | "Episode Three" | 22 January 2008 | TBA |
It is Easter on the remote Isles of Scilly and, as the new holiday season gets underway, trawlerman Martin Bond has a bold new idea to increase sales of his fish. Toby's ex-wife, Liz, joins him on the islands to help set up the new pub and Heike the vet faces a financial crisis which threatens her whole future on Scilly.
| 4 | "Episode Four" | 29 January 2008 | TBA |
Father Guy is finding it hard settling into his new parish on the Isles of Scilly – he is feeling lonely and isolated and he has also upset many of the islanders over his firm stance on traditional church values. Meanwhile, a familiar face returns to the islands and this time romance really is in the air. Toby the baker comes up with a revolutionary new idea to increase business at the pub.
| 5 | "Episode Five" | 5 February 2008 | TBA |
Father Guy's difficulties coming to terms with his new job increase when the death of a young lifeboatman throws the Isles of Scilly into grief. Prolonged bad weather threatens the financial success of the summer season and WPC Nikki Green tries to plan a future with her new boyfriend on the mainland.
| 6 | "Episode Six" | 12 February 2008 | TBA |
Following the biggest funeral in living memory on the Isles of Scilly, Bishop Bill arrives to help lift the spirit of the islanders after their traumatic start to summer. Imaginative new ways emerge for raising money from the tourists and preparations are under way for the launch of Radio Scilly, the world's smallest radio station.
| 7 | "Episode Seven" | 19 February 2008 | TBA |
Following the advice of his boss, Bishop Bill, the beleaguered chaplain to the Isles of Scilly, Father Guy, throws himself into the job with renewed vigour. Keri Jones finds himself in Milan on an unusual mission for Radio Scilly and things look up for Heike the vet when she discovers a private zoo.
| 8 | "Episode Eight" | 26 February 2008 | TBA |
On the Isles of Scilly it is the dawn of a new era with the launch of the world's smallest radio station. The two retired priests, Donald and Margaret, fly in to lend a much needed hand to Father Guy and a big new development on Tresco offers unusual opportunities to the islanders.
| 9 | "Episode Nine" | 4 March 2008 | TBA |
With the end of the holiday season on the Isles of Scilly, islanders need to find new and imaginative ways of earning a living during the long winter months. Toby and Pauli have an ambitious plan to publish a book, whilst Auntie Kris wants to capitalise on a new dancing craze that is gripping the locals. The lowest tides of the year have a strange effect on island life.
| 10 | "Episode Ten" | 11 March 2008 | TBA |
On the Isles of Scilly, they are preparing for a big commemoration of the worst peacetime disaster in the history of the Royal Navy when 1,500 sailors drowned in a storm on the Western Rocks 300 years ago. Heike the vet takes the chance to examine some of the animals in her care beneath the waves and island children get a rare taste of mainland life.
| 11 | "Episode Eleven" | 18 March 2008 | TBA |
On the Isles there are more single men to women than almost anywhere else in Britain. Toby finds a girlfriend at the pub.
| 12 | "Episode Twelve" | 25 March 2008 | TBA |
In the final episode of the series, the Isles of Scilly look forward to a new year – and a brighter future. The Revd David makes a spectacular debut in the annual Scilly pantomime and there is some dramatic and unexpected news about the future of the islands' school. Plans are announced for an epic voyage by Scilly men to row across the Atlantic and the islands' vet, Heike, reveals she is lonely.

=== Third series ===
The third series of An Island Parish began on 19 September 2008 on BBC Two. The series was again in twelve parts.

The series looked particularly at the work of the British Methodist Church in the islands, as seen through the eyes of the local minister, the Revd David Easton. Of the third series, Nigel Farrell, the director said, "We do not have any actors, or scripts, so what you see and hear is the reality of life, which can sometimes be hard in any small community. Up to now we have focused very much on the ministry of Anglican clergy, but in Cornwall especially, almost all communities have an active Methodist presence, and we felt it was time to show some of the ways in which Free church ministers are involved in the busy lives of their communities." The third series was filmed over the preceding six months before the first episode aired, with more episodes completed while the series aired. Also included in the series was the story of the Scilly Boys' Atlantic row, and the Eden Project farewell to Bishop Bill Ind, who retired in April 2008.

| # | Title | Original release date | Production code |
|---|---|---|---|
| 1 | "The Start of a Long Journey" | 19 September 2008 | TBA |
Love is in the air on the Isles of Scilly off the coast of Cornwall as Sophie and Mark the lifeboatman plan their wedding. The Reverend David helps out with the start of the tourist season and Toby the baker indulges in a fantasy he has been dreaming about for months.
| 2 | "Always Check the Forecast" | 26 September 2008 | TBA |
The minister, the Reverend David, is increasingly concerned for the families of the four island men planning a dangerous row across the Atlantic. The legendary boatman Fraser Hicks is having bad luck as usual getting his boat ready for the all-important holiday season and children from the islands' school embark on a daunting journey to very unfamiliar territory.
| 3 | "Just Days to Go" | 3 October 2008 | TBA |
It is Easter on the Isles of Scilly, the traditional start of the holiday season, and the islanders hold their breath to see how much the credit crunch will affect their livelihoods. It is time to say a fond farewell to Bishop Bill, the Bishop of Truro. The locals turn out in force as the Revd David blesses the little rowing boat which they hope will carry the Scilly Boys safely home on their epic voyage from America.
| 4 | "Unchartered Waters" | 10 October 2008 | TBA |
The four island men who plan to row across the Atlantic say a tearful farewell to the islands. The Reverend David makes a rare trip to the mainland.
| 5 | "Best Foot Forward" | 10 October 2008 | TBA |
Heike the cash-strapped vet comes up with an extraordinary idea to raise money. Leo the bull-terrier gives Auntie Kris a nasty shock.
| 6 | "Departures and an Unexpected Arrival" | 24 October 2008 | TBA |
There's no Indian food on the Isles of Scilly so it is a big night for Paulie and Toby who are trying to introduce curry on their pub menu.
| 7 | "Sowing the Seeds" | 31 October 2008 | TBA |
The islanders must come up with new and innovative ideas to earn cash quickly as the economic squeeze bites on the Isles of Scilly. Heike turns to foot modelling.
| 8 | "Life Will Never Be the Same" | 7 November 2008 | TBA |
News reaches the Isles of Scilly in the early hours that the four island men attempting to row home on The Scilly Boys on a 3,000-mile voyage from the United States have been capsized.
| 9 | "Coming Home" | 14 November 2008 | TBA |
It is an emotional moment on the Isles of Scilly as they prepare to welcome home the four island men who nearly drowned attempting to row across the Atlantic Ocean.
| 10 | "Difficult Days for the Minister" | 21 November 2008 | TBA |
The countdown is underway for the re-election of the minister, the Reverend David Easton. It is up to his congregation to decide if he should stay.
| 11 | "Winds of Change" | 28 November 2008 | TBA |
Tension rises as David's boss, the Revd Steve Wild, arrives from the mainland to oversee the minister's crucial re-election vote.
| 12 | "A Sad End to the Affair" | 5 December 2008 | TBA |
There is a shock for the islanders as the result of the vote on the Reverend David is released and his future made public. Sophie prays for good weather.

=== Fourth series ===
The fourth series of An Island Parish began on 19 October 2009 on BBC Two. It ran for 14 episodes.

| # | Title | Original release date | Production code |
|---|---|---|---|
| 1 | "Reeling from the Blow" | 19 October 2009 | TBA |
The Reverend David Easton struggles to come to terms with the biggest blow of his entire career, a small group of his congregation have voted him off the islands. Newly engaged island vet Heike and her fiancee Alistair ponder whether they can really afford a proper wedding. After the disastrous attempt by four island men to row home from New York, a wrecked rowing boat turns up unexpectedly in Newfoundland.

=== Fifth series ===
In January 2011 a fifth series of An Island Parish began, this time located on Barra in the Scottish Outer Hebrides. It features Fr John Paul's first year as the parish priest at Castlebay.

| # | Title | Original release date | Production code |
|---|---|---|---|
| 1 | "A Strange Turn of Events..." | 21 January 2011 | TBA |
Having left Glencoe, a nervous young Roman Catholic priest, Father John Paul Mackinnon, arrives on the tiny island of Barra to take up his new post as parish priest, but how will he cope with life in one of Britain's remotest communities? And will he ever be able to live up to the expectations of his two fellow experienced priests, Father Calum and Father Roddy?
| 2 | "A Legacy of the Past..." | 28 January 2011 | TBA |
It's Father John Paul's first big test as he settles into life on Barra. His boss Bishop Joe arrives from the mainland to assess the new priest's progress. Meanwhile, the newcomer gets an extraordinary gift from one of his more eccentric parishioners, and Father Roddy's housekeeper Sandy begins a project which she hopes will help families from all over the world trace their Scottish ancestry.
| 3 | "Forgive us our Sins..." | 4 February 2011 | TBA |
As the shortest day of the year approaches in his remote island parish, the new priest Father John Paul launches a bold plan to bring light into the heart of his community through the long hours of darkness. Meanwhile, it is the season for parishioners to clear their consciences and make confession; and Father Roddy's American housekeeper Sandy decides she wants to change nationality and become Scottish.
| 4 | "Lighten Our Darkness..." | 11 February 2011 | TBA |
New priest Father John Paul is thrown into the spotlight as Christmas comes to his island parish on the southern tip of the Outer Hebrides, off the north-west coast of Scotland. Meanwhile, as Wallace the fisherman struggles to improve his catches of prawn, he has doubts about his future in the industry; and the whiskey flows as Father Roddy entertains a group of friends from the other side of Europe.
| 5 | "New Lives, New Beginnings..." | 18 February 2011 | TBA |
As the holiday season gets underway and the sun shines down on the southerly islands of the Outer Hebrides, new priest Father John Paul faces an uphill battle to keep his congregation coming to church. Meanwhile Donnie the dustman faces a typically 'island' dilemma, and Father Roddy – a crofter as well as a parish priest – gets an important lesson in lambing.
| 6 | "A Very Serious Business..." | 25 February 2011 | TBA |
With the arrival of Easter, it's the busiest week of the year for the Roman Catholic priests of Barra and South Uist, on the southerly tip of the Outer Hebrides – but Father Roddy and Father John Paul still find time for their long-awaited and bitterly contested golf challenge. Meanwhile, local businesses struggle in the early weeks of the holiday season, and a pregnant young nurse from the island's hospital is flown off to the mainland in a medical emergency.
| 7 | "The Long, Long Days of Summer..." | 4 March 2011 | TBA |
It's the season for marriage on the Outer Hebrides. Father Roddy conducts one of the biggest weddings of the year on South Uist, while over on the neighbouring island of Barra Father John Paul is introduced to a ritual that dates back more than a thousand years. Meanwhile, problems with the ferries from the mainland threaten the start of the islands' crucial holiday season. After weeks of waiting, Clare is overjoyed to hear some good news at last.
| 8 | "For Those in Peril..." | 11 March 2011 | TBA |
The new parish priest Father John Paul struggles to overcome his nerves at the biggest event in the annual calendar. It's the blessing of the boats at the Fishermen's Mass, which involves nearly every islander. Meanwhile, Father Roddy tries prayer to help overcome the problems of a leaking church; and his American housekeeper Sandy gets news which will change her life for ever.
| 9 | "Clash of the Titans..." | 18 March 2011 | TBA |
On the island of South Uist, after months of secret planning, Father Roddy at last goes head to head with his parishioner Flora Campbell in the battle for top honours at the local agricultural show. Meanwhile on Barra, Father John Paul, still without a housekeeper, undergoes a crash course to improve his skills in the kitchen; and the success of the bi-annual Clan Macneil gathering at Kisimul Castle comes under threat.
| 10 | "The Gathering of the Clans..." | 25 March 2011 | TBA |
On the island of South Uist, Father Roddy and Father John Paul go to extraordinary lengths to give their friend and fellow priest Father Calum a birthday surprise he'll never forget. Meanwhile, across on Barra, the islanders are preparing for the imminent gathering of the Clan Macneil; and over in the heart of the USA, an 82-year-old clan member has to make the difficult decision about whether to make the four thousand mile journey to join them at their ancestral home.
| 11 | "Getting to Know You..." | 1 April 2011 | TBA |
On the remote island of Barra, Mac and Linda arrive from Missouri for the gathering of the Clan Macneil – but Mac's reaction to his ancestral home is not what he expected. Fr John Paul investigates the truth behind the famous Ealing comedy Whisky Galore! and Fr Roddy struggles to maintain the honour of the Catholic church in a half-marathon race.
| 12 | "A Question of Survival..." | 15 April 2011 | TBA |
It is the end of Father John Paul's first year as the new Catholic priest on Barra, one of the remotest islands in the Outer Hebrides, but celebrations are in danger of being overshadowed by worries over the whole future of island life. Fishermen say their livelihood is under threat from an unexpected source, and there are new fears over how the remoter communities will survive. Meanwhile, Father Roddy's working hard to perfect his skills as a conjuror; and Scraggie Aggie unexpectedly becomes the life and soul of the party.

=== Sixth series ===
A sixth series was filmed by Tiger Aspect during the Spring and Summer of 2011 on the islands of Barra and South Uist.

| # | Title | Original release date | Production code |
|---|---|---|---|
| 1 | "A Bolt from the Blue" | 2 January 2012 | TBA |
One year into the job and local parish priest Father John Paul has to face up to controversial issues threatening the future of his island parish. Shepherd Ronald Mackinnon and the other crofters try every way to eke out a living from the island. And Father Roddy receives news which comes as a bit of a bombshell for him and the islanders.
| 2 | "The End of an Era" | 9 January 2012 | TBA |
Easter brings good weather and a new air of optimism to the remote island of Barra. Local crofter Angus John Morrison turns his hand to something new – tourism – which proves rather trickier than he anticipated. And Father John Paul is in danger of feeling more isolated than ever with the sudden departure of best friend and colleague, Father Roddy.
| 3 | "Pennies from Heaven" | 23 January 2012 | TBA |
On Barra it has not been a great start to the tourist season thanks to the non-stop rain; Sheila McIntosh, the island's only ice-cream maker, prays for sunshine. Also, the biggest fishing competition of the year pits islander against islander for one of the coveted trophies and Father John Paul adjudicates.
| 4 | "A Case of Family Values" | 30 January 2012 | TBA |
Summertime on the Outer Hebrides and Father John Paul is struggling to cover all his churches on the beautiful, but sparsely populated, islands. He's looking forward to a helping hand from a Jesuit Priest who plans to come over from the mainland. Meanwhile one enterprising young member of Barra has come up with a novel and ambitious idea to bring the island's history, and heritage, back to life.
| 5 | "The Pull of the Islands" | 6 February 2012 | TBA |
The summer season is in full swing and Father John Paul sets off on an adventure to a remote local island with a very special history. The whole community is gripped with excitement as the big wedding day dawns, for which friends and relations have returned to the island from around the world. And it is harvest time for crofter Angus John; will all his hard work over the summer have paid off and produce enough feed for his precious cattle?
| 6 | "Hopes for the Future" | 13 February 2012 | TBA |
It is autumn and Father John Paul sets out on the arduous annual pilgrimage to Barra's highest point to polish up the island's iconic statue. Below, a heated public meeting is on the cards to argue over government plans for a huge and possibly job-threatening conservation area off the islands. Meantime Coppertop, one of the local fishermen, investigates a unique plan of his own to make money from the sea.

=== Seventh series ===
The seventh series, set in Sark and broadcast in 2013, ran for 6 episodes.

=== Eighth series ===
The eighth series, set again in Sark and broadcast in 2014, ran for 6 episodes.

=== Ninth series ===
The ninth series, set in the Falkland Islands and broadcast in 2015, ran for 6 episodes.

=== Tenth series ===
The tenth series, set again in the Falkland Islands and broadcast in 2015, ran for six episodes.

=== Eleventh Series ===
The eleventh Series was set in the Shetland Islands and broadcast in Spring 2016 for six episodes.

=== Twelfth Series ===
This series was broadcast in early 2017 and was set in the British Overseas Territory of Anguilla.
