= James Alleyn =

James Alleyn may refer to:

- James Allen (educator) (1683–1746), or Alleyn, master of the College of God's Gift in Dulwich
- Sir James Alleyn (judge) (died c. 1457), Irish judge

== See also ==
- James Allen (disambiguation)
