= Jamie Allen (footballer, born May 1995) =

Montserratian footballer

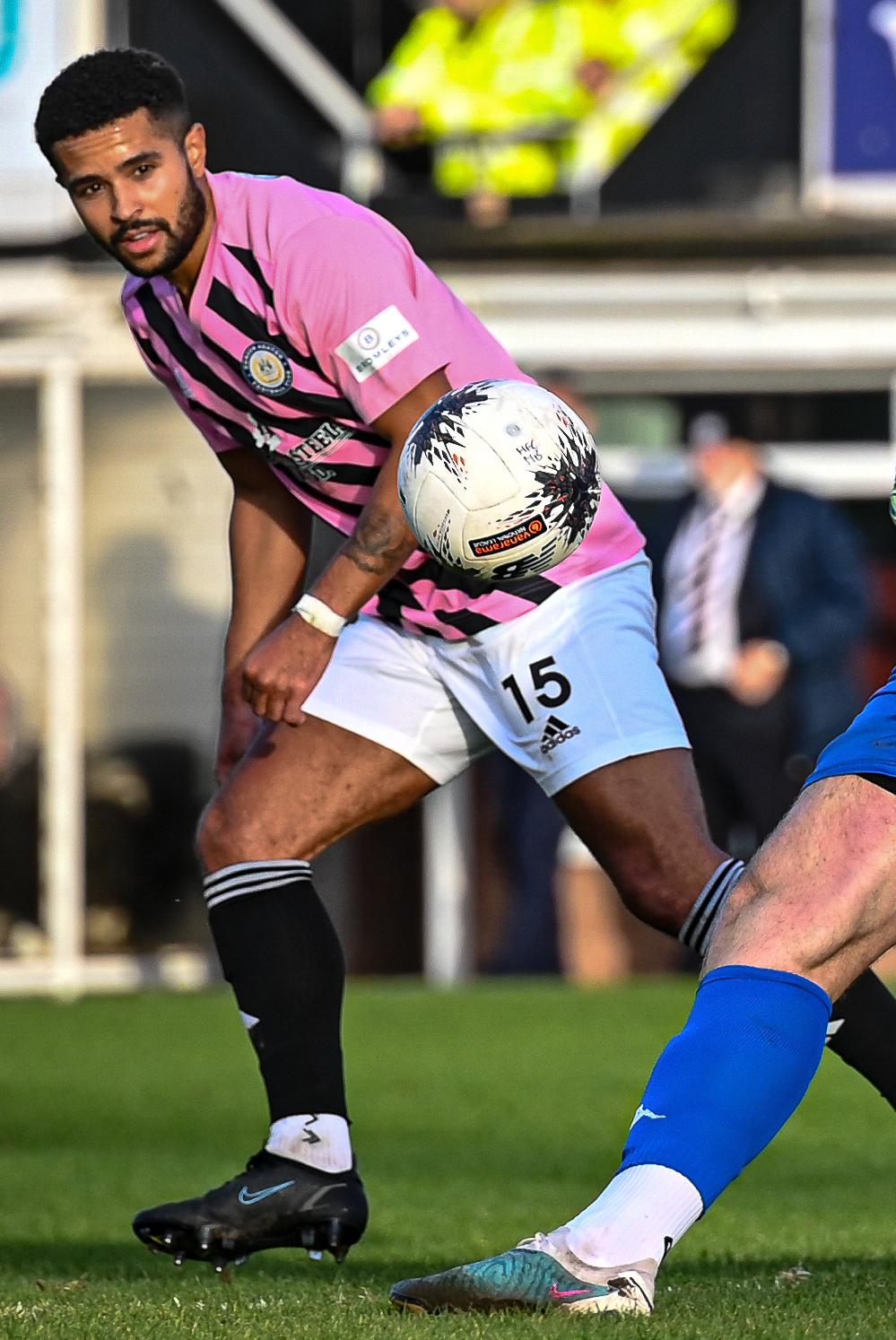
- Jamie Allen, playing for Curzon Ashton, in 2023

Personal information
- Full name: Jamie Paul Allen
- Date of birth: 25 May 1995 (age 31)
- Place of birth: Preston, England
- Height: 1.75 m (5 ft 9 in)
- Position: Forward

Team information
- Current team: Workington

Youth career
- –2012: Fleetwood Town

Senior career*
Years	Team	Apps	(Gls)
2012–2015	Fleetwood Town	5	(1)
2013–2014	→ Barrow (loan)	17	(2)
2014	→ AFC Fylde (loan)	5	(1)
2015	Stalybridge Celtic	13	(3)
2015–2017	Southport	68	(14)
2017–2019	Dover Athletic	53	(7)
2019–2022	FC Halifax Town	88	(9)
2022–2023	AFC Telford United	29	(0)
2023–2024	Curzon Ashton	30	(0)
2024–2025	Workington	36	(3)
2025–	Bamber Bridge	8+	(5)

International career^{‡}
2019–2024	Montserrat	15	(0)
- * Club domestic league appearances and goals as of 21:47, 7 September 2026 (UTC) ‡ National team caps and goals as of 16:51, 8 September 2024 (UTC)

Jamie Paul Allen (born 25 May 1995) is a Montserratian professional footballer who plays as a forward for Northern Premier League Premier Division club Bamber Bridge.

In 2022, he was a contestant on the eighth series of Love Island.

== Club career ==
=== Fleetwood Town ===
Allen started his career with Fleetwood Town, making his Football League debut in 2013. He had loan spells with non-league Barrow and AFC Fylde, before being released in the summer of 2015, having made five appearances and scoring once.

=== Southport ===
Southport signed Allen soon after his release. He scored four goals in his first season.

=== Dover Athletic ===
Following Southport's relegation in the 2016–17 season, Allen joined National League side Dover Athletic for an undisclosed fee. Allen made his debut for the club on 5 August 2017, in an opening day 1–0 away victory over Hartlepool United in which he scored the game's only goal.

=== FC Halifax Town ===
On 9 July 2019, Allen signed for FC Halifax Town after cancelling his contract with Dover by mutual consent. On 9 June 2022, Allen signed a new contract with the club to take him through to the 2022–23 season. On 24 August 2022, Allen was announced to have left the club by mutual consent following his return from Love Island.

=== AFC Telford United ===
On 29 August 2022, Allen signed for National League North club AFC Telford United on a one-year deal.

=== Bamber Bridge ===
In July 2025, Allen joined Northern Premier League Premier Division side Bamber Bridge.

== International career ==
Allen was called up by Montserrat in November 2019 and made his debut against El Salvador on 16 November 2019.

== Style of play ==
Allen can play as either a winger or as a striker. He is known for his electric pace.

== Personal life ==
In July 2022, Allen became a contestant on the eighth series of ITV2's Love Island. At the time of filming, Allen was contracted to National League side Halifax. His club said that "the matter will be reviewed on his return." He was dumped from the villa alongside fellow contestant Danica Taylor on day 51.
