= Love Island (2015 TV series) series 8 =

2022 series of Love Island

Love Island
- Series 8
- Presented by: Laura Whitmore
- No. of days: 58
- No. of contestants: 36
- Winners: Ekin-Su Cülcüloğlu; Davide Sanclimenti
- Runners-up: Luca Bish; Gemma Owen
- Companion show: Love Island: Aftersun
- No. of episodes: 49

Release
- Original network: ITV2
- Original release: 6 June – 1 August 2022

Series chronology
- ← Previous; Series 7 Next → Series 9

The eighth series of Love Island was broadcast from 6 June 2022 to 1 August 2022 on ITV2 with Laura Whitmore presenting the series and Iain Stirling narrating.

The series featured cameo appearances from singer Becky Hill, who appeared during a party in the villa performing songs including "Crazy What Love Can Do", as well as DJ Joel Corry, who performed during a VIP party. Alfie Boe also made an appearance to perform during a date. On 1 August 2022, the series was won by Ekin-Su Cülcüloğlu and Davide Sanclimenti with 63.7% of the final vote. Gemma Owen and Luca Bish finished as runners-up.

The 'split or steal' element was cut from the eighth series finale for the first time in the show's history. With 'split or steal,' the winners are presented with two sealed envelopes, one that's empty and one that contains a £50k prize. In previous seasons, the person who received the money was asked if they wanted to 'steal' it or 'split' it with their partner. In series eight, the winning couple automatically shared the prize money. ITV2 did not officially comment as to why they did away with the 'split or steal' element.

== Production ==
During the final of the previous series on 23 August 2021, it was announced that the show would return for an eighth series the following year. The series this time was filmed in a new villa in Mallorca, making it the first time since the third series the show has moved to a new location, excluding the winter series that was filmed in South Africa. The first teaser trailer aired on 6 May 2022, a month before the show's launch with several more trailers being released in the following weeks, featuring cartoon animations and tag lines from the show. It was also announced that the contestants would wear second-hand clothes for the first time, following the show's partnership with eBay, with bosses trying to aim for a "more eco-friendly production." For the first time, Islanders have access to a shared wardrobe in the new villa, featuring pre-owned clothing to promote sustainability and extend the lifecycle of garments.

=== Featured locations ===
The main villa was Sa Vinyassa in Sant Llorenç des Cardassar, Casa Amor was the nearby Alchemy Villa, and the Vibe Club was the Shiva Beach Club in Llucmajor.

== Islanders ==
The original Islanders for the eighth series were announced on 30 May 2022, one week before the series launch. For the first time in the show's history, the series featured a returning contestant, with Adam Collard having previously appeared in the fourth series.

For the first time, Love Island included a deaf islander. Tasha Ghouri is a dancer and model, who wears a cochlear implant.

Islander	Age	Hometown	Entered	Exited	Status	Ref
Davide Sanclimenti	27	Manchester	Day 1	Day 58	Winner	
Ekin-Su Cülcüloğlu	27	London	Day 3	Day 58	Winner	
Gemma Owen	19	Chester	Day 1	Day 58	Runner-up	
Luca Bish	23	Brighton	Day 1	Day 58	Runner-up	
Dami Hope	26	Dublin	Day 1	Day 58	Third place	
Indiyah Polack	23	London	Day 1	Day 58	Third place	
Andrew Le Page	27	Guernsey	Day 1	Day 58	Fourth place	
Tasha Ghouri	23	Thirsk	Day 1	Day 58	Fourth place	
Adam Collard	26	Newcastle	Day 36	Day 56	Dumped	
Paige Thorne	24	Swansea	Day 1	Day 56	Dumped	
Danica Taylor	21	Leicester	Day 12	Day 51	Dumped	
Jamie Allen	27	Preston	Day 45	Day 51	Dumped	
Deji Adeniyi	25	Bedford	Day 26	Day 49	Dumped	
Lacey Edwards	25	Swindon	Day 45	Day 49	Dumped	
Nathalia Campos	23	London	Day 45	Day 49	Dumped	
Reece Ford	23	Coventry	Day 45	Day 49	Dumped	
Billy Brown	23	Surrey	Day 26	Day 44	Dumped	
Summer Botwe	22	Hertfordshire	Day 27	Day 44	Dumped	
Coco Lodge	27	Surrey	Day 27	Day 39	Dumped	
Josh Le Grove	22	Halstead	Day 26	Day 39	Dumped	
Jacques O'Neill	23	Walney	Day 7	Day 37	Walked	
Chyna Mills	23	Leeds	Day 27	Day 35	Dumped	
Jay Younger	28	Edinburgh	Day 9	Day 35	Dumped	
Cheyanne Kerr	23	Barnsley	Day 27	Day 31	Dumped	
George Tasker	23	Cirencester	Day 26	Day 31	Dumped	
Jack Keating	23	Dublin	Day 26	Day 31	Dumped	
Jazmine Nichol	21	Newcastle	Day 27	Day 31	Dumped	
Mollie Salmon	23	Southampton	Day 27	Day 31	Dumped	
Samuel Agbiji	22	Manchester	Day 26	Day 31	Dumped	
Antigoni Buxton	26	London	Day 17	Day 25	Dumped	
Charlie Radnedge	28	London	Day 17	Day 25	Dumped	
Amber Beckford	24	London	Day 1	Day 15	Dumped	
Ikenna Ekwonna	23	Nottingham	Day 1	Day 15	Dumped	
Remi Lambert	22	Manchester	Day 9	Day 12	Dumped	
Afia Tonkmor	25	London	Day 3	Day 8	Dumped	
Liam Llewellyn	22	Newport	Day 1	Day 5	Walked	

== Future appearances ==
In 2025, Luca Bish and Ekin-Su Cülcüloğlu returned for series two of Love Island: All Stars.

In 2026, Jack Keating returned for series three of Love Island: All Stars.

In 2026, Antigoni Buxton represented Cyprus in the Eurovision Song Contest. She finished in 19th place with 75 points.

== Coupling and elimination history ==
	Week 1			Week 2		Week 3		Week 4		Week 5	Week 6			Week 7		Week 8		Week 9		
	Day 1	Day 2	Day 5	Day 8	Day 12	Day 15	Day 18	Day 23	Day 25	Day 31	Day 35	Day 38	Day 39	Day 44	Day 47	Day 49	Day 51	Day 56		Final
Davide	Not in Villa	Gemma	Ekin-Su		Gemma	Safe	Antigoni	Ekin-Su	Safe	Ekin-Su	Safe	Ekin-Su	Safe	Safe	Ekin-Su	Safe	Safe	Gemma & Luca; Adam & Paige; Least compatible	Finalist	Winner (Day 58)
Ekin-Su	Not in Villa		Davide		Jay	Vulnerable	Charlie	Davide	Safe	Davide	Safe	Davide	Safe	Safe	Davide	Safe	Safe	Gemma & Luca; Adam & Paige; Least compatible	Finalist	Winner (Day 58)
Gemma	Liam	Davide	Luca		Davide	Safe	Luca	Luca	Safe	Luca	Safe	Luca	Safe	Safe	Luca	Safe	Safe	Davide & Ekin-Su; Andrew & Tasha; Least compatible	Finalist	Runner-up (Day 58)
Luca	Paige		Gemma		Danica	Safe	Gemma	Gemma	Safe	Gemma	Safe	Gemma	Safe	Safe	Gemma	Safe	Safe	Davide & Ekin-Su; Andrew & Tasha; Least compatible	Finalist	Runner-up (Day 58)
Dami	Amber		Amber		Amber	Safe	Indiyah	Indiyah	Safe	Summer	Vulnerable	Indiyah	Safe	Vulnerable	Indiyah	Safe	Vulnerable	Davide & Ekin-Su; Gemma & Luca; Least compatible	Finalist	Third place (Day 58)
Indiyah	Ikenna		Ikenna		Ikenna	Safe	Dami	Dami	Safe	Deji	Safe	Dami	Safe	Safe	Dami	Safe	Vulnerable	Davide & Ekin-Su; Gemma & Luca; Least compatible	Finalist	Third place (Day 58)
Andrew	Tasha		Tasha		Tasha	Vulnerable	Tasha	Tasha	Safe	Coco	Safe	Tasha	Vulnerable	Safe	Tasha	Safe	Safe	Davide & Ekin-Su; Adam & Paige; Least compatible	Finalist	Fourth place (Day 58)
Tasha	Andrew		Andrew		Andrew	Vulnerable	Andrew	Andrew	Safe	Billy	Safe	Andrew	Vulnerable	Safe	Andrew	Safe	Safe	Davide & Ekin-Su; Adam & Paige; Least compatible	Finalist	Fourth place (Day 58)
Adam	Not in Villa											Paige	Safe	Safe	Paige	Safe	Vulnerable	Davide & Ekin-Su; Gemma & Luca; Least compatible	Eliminated	Dumped (Day 56)
Paige	Luca		Single	Jacques	Jacques	Safe	Jay	Jacques	Safe	Jacques	Safe	Adam	Safe	Safe	Adam	Safe	Vulnerable	Davide & Ekin-Su; Gemma & Luca; Least compatible	Eliminated	Dumped (Day 56)
Danica	Not in Villa				Luca	Safe	Jacques	Jay	Vulnerable	Josh	Safe	Billy	Safe	Vulnerable	Jamie	Vulnerable	Eliminated	Dumped (Day 51)		
Jamie	Not in Villa														Danica	Vulnerable	Eliminated	Dumped (Day 51)		
Deji	Not in Villa									Indiyah	Safe	Coco	Vulnerable	Safe	Lacey	Eliminated	Dumped (Day 49)			
Lacey	Not in Villa														Deji	Eliminated	Dumped (Day 49)			
Nathalia	Not in Villa														Reece	Eliminated	Dumped (Day 49)			
Reece	Not in Villa														Nathalia	Eliminated	Dumped (Day 49)			
Billy	Not in Villa									Tasha	Safe	Danica	Safe	Vulnerable	Dumped (Day 44)					
Summer	Not in Villa									Dami	Vulnerable	Josh	Vulnerable	Vulnerable	Dumped (Day 44)					
Coco	Not in Villa									Andrew	Safe	Deji	Eliminated	Dumped (Day 39)						
Josh	Not in Villa									Danica	Safe	Summer	Eliminated	Dumped (Day 39)						
Jacques	Not in Villa			Paige	Paige	Safe	Danica	Paige	Safe	Paige	Safe	Walked (Day 37)								
Chyna	Not in Villa									Jay	Vulnerable	Dumped (Day 35)								
Jay	Not in Villa				Ekin-Su	Vulnerable	Paige	Danica	Vulnerable	Chyna	Vulnerable	Dumped (Day 35)								
Cheyanne	Not in Villa									Single	Dumped (Day 31)									
George	Not in Villa									Single	Dumped (Day 31)									
Jack	Not in Villa									Single	Dumped (Day 31)									
Jazmine	Not in Villa									Single	Dumped (Day 31)									
Mollie	Not in Villa									Single	Dumped (Day 31)									
Samuel	Not in Villa									Single	Dumped (Day 31)									
Antigoni	Not in Villa						Davide	Charlie	Vulnerable	Dumped (Day 25)										
Charlie	Not in Villa						Ekin-Su	Antigoni	Vulnerable	Dumped (Day 25)										
Amber	Dami		Dami		Dami	Eliminated	Dumped (Day 15)													
Ikenna	Indiyah		Indiyah		Indiyah	Eliminated	Dumped (Day 15)													
Remi	Not in Villa				Single	Dumped (Day 12)														
Afia	Not in Villa		Single		Dumped (Day 8)															
Liam	Gemma	Single	Walked (Day 5)																	
Walked	none		Liam	none								Jacques	none							
Dumped	No; Dumping			Afia; Failed to couple up	Remi; Failed to couple up	Amber, Ikenna; Public's choice to dump	No; Dumping		Antigoni; Boys' choice to dump	Cheyanne, George, Jack, Jazmine, Mollie, Samuel; Failed to couple up	Chyna & Jay; Islanders' choice to dump	No; Dumping	Coco, Josh; Public's choice to dump	Billy; Girls' choice to dump	No; Dumping	Deji & Lacey, Nathalia & Reece; Public's choice to dump	Danica & Jamie; Public's choice to dump	Adam & Paige; Public's choice to dump		Andrew & Tasha; 10.07% to win
Dumped	No; Dumping			Afia; Failed to couple up	Remi; Failed to couple up	Amber, Ikenna; Public's choice to dump	No; Dumping		Antigoni; Boys' choice to dump	Cheyanne, George, Jack, Jazmine, Mollie, Samuel; Failed to couple up	Chyna & Jay; Islanders' choice to dump	No; Dumping	Coco, Josh; Public's choice to dump	Billy; Girls' choice to dump	No; Dumping	Deji & Lacey, Nathalia & Reece; Public's choice to dump	Danica & Jamie; Public's choice to dump	Adam & Paige; Public's choice to dump		Dami & Indiyah; 11.77% to win
Dumped	No; Dumping			Afia; Failed to couple up	Remi; Failed to couple up	Amber, Ikenna; Public's choice to dump	No; Dumping		Charlie; Girls' choice to dump	Cheyanne, George, Jack, Jazmine, Mollie, Samuel; Failed to couple up	Chyna & Jay; Islanders' choice to dump	No; Dumping	Coco, Josh; Public's choice to dump	Summer; Boys' choice to dump	No; Dumping	Deji & Lacey, Nathalia & Reece; Public's choice to dump	Danica & Jamie; Public's choice to dump	Adam & Paige; Public's choice to dump		Gemma & Luca; 14.47% to win
Dumped	No; Dumping			Afia; Failed to couple up	Remi; Failed to couple up	Amber, Ikenna; Public's choice to dump	No; Dumping		Charlie; Girls' choice to dump	Cheyanne, George, Jack, Jazmine, Mollie, Samuel; Failed to couple up	Chyna & Jay; Islanders' choice to dump	No; Dumping	Coco, Josh; Public's choice to dump	Summer; Boys' choice to dump	No; Dumping	Deji & Lacey, Nathalia & Reece; Public's choice to dump	Danica & Jamie; Public's choice to dump	Adam & Paige; Public's choice to dump		Davide & Ekin-Su; 63.69% to win

== Weekly summary ==
The main events in the Love Island villa are summarised in the table below.

Week 1	Entrances	On Day 1, Amber, Andrew, Dami, Davide, Gemma, Ikenna, Indiyah, Liam, Luca, Paige and Tasha entered the villa.; On Day 3, Afia and Ekin-Su entered the villa.
Week 1	Coupling	On Day 1, following a public vote to decide the first couples of the series, Amber was paired with Dami, Gemma coupled up with Liam, Indiyah was chosen to be with Ikenna, Paige with Luca, and Tasha was picked to couple up with Andrew.; On Day 2, Davide, who entered after the coupling, had to steal one girl for himself. He chose Gemma, leaving Liam single.; On Day 5, the islanders recoupled for the first time with the boys picking which girl they'd like to be with. Andrew and Tasha, Dami and Amber, and Ikenna and Indiyah all remained together, meanwhile Luca chose Gemma, and Davide coupled up with Ekin-Su. Afia and Paige stayed single.
Week 1	Challenges	On Day 2, the girls and the boys competed against each other in "Nothing to Declare", in which they had to guess which islander a fact was about. To make their guess they had to use a prop security baton on the islander and kiss them. The girls won the challenge.
Week 1	Dates	On Day 3, Davide and Gemma left the villa to go on their first date, where they went lemonade making.; On Day 3, the public voted for who they wanted new girls Afia and Ekin-Su to go on dates with. They picked Liam to date both.
Week 1	Exits	On Day 5, Liam decided to voluntarily leave the villa.
Week 2	Entrances	On Day 7, Jacques entered the villa.; On Day 9, Jay and Remi entered the villa.; On Day 12, Danica entered the villa.
Week 2	Coupling	On Day 8, Jacques was given the choice of the single girls, Afia and Paige to couple up with. He chose Paige, ultimately dumping Afia from the villa.; On Day 12, the islanders re-coupled, this time with the girls choosing. New girl Danica was first to pick, and chose to couple up with Luca. Meanwhile, Amber and Dami, Indiyah and Ikenna, Paige and Jacques, and Tasha and Andrew all remained together, whereas Ekin-Su picked Jay, and Gemma went with Davide. As Remi was the only single islander, he was dumped.
Week 2	Challenges	On Day 9 the boys competed in the "Men-chanics" challenge. They had to bicep curl some tires before climbing through tyres carrying their couple and doing some squats and finally clear a car. The girls chose Dami as the winner.; On Day 12, the girls competed in "Sex Sea". During the challenge, new girl Danica made her entrance. The girls had to spin around on a giant clam before sliding into a pool to then perform a sexy dance for the boy of their choice. They then had to wheel their boy along a "Catch of the Day" trolley before continuing the dance on a bed. The boys voted Tasha as the "Sexiest Girl".
Week 2	Dates	On Day 7, new boy Jacques took single islanders Afia and Paige on dates.; On Day 8, Amber and Dami went to play tennis for their first date.; On Day 10, new Islanders Jay and Remi were asked to choose three other islanders to take on dates with each of them preparing a starter, a main course and a dessert. Jay chose Amber, Ekin-Su and Tasha whilst Remi picked Indiyah, Paige and Ekin-Su.
Week 2	Exits	On Day 8, following Jacques decision to couple up with Paige, Afia was left single and dumped.; On Day 12, Remi was dumped from the island after failing to couple up.
Week 3	Entrances	On Day 17, Antigoni and Charlie entered the villa.
Week 3	Coupling	On Day 18, the islanders re-coupled, this time with the boys choosing. Luca was first to pick, and chose to couple up with Gemma. Meanwhile, Andrew and Tasha remained together, Jay picked Paige, Dami picked Indiyah, Charlie picked Ekin-Su, and Davide went with Antigoni. With Danica being the only remaining islander, Jacques coupled up with her.
Week 3	Challenges	On Day 15, the couples took part in "Lip Service" where the boys had to transfer cocktail ingredients to their partner using their mouths whilst making their way across a slippery dancefloor. As Danica and Luca filled their cocktail glass the quickest, they were the winners of the challenge.
Week 3	Dates	On Day 14, Danica and Luca left the villa to go on a date.; On Day 17, new girl Antigoni was able to choose three boys to take on dates. She picked Dami, Davide and Jay.; On Day 18, new boy Charlie chose two girls to go on a date in the hideaway terrace hot tub. He picked Ekin-Su and Tasha.; On Day 19, Dami and Indiyah went on their first date.
Week 3	Exits	On Day 15, after receiving the fewest public votes, Amber and Ikenna were dumped from the island.
Week 4	Entrances	On Day 26, Billy, Deji, George, Jack, Josh and Samuel entered Casa Amor.
Week 4	Coupling	On Day 23, the islanders re-coupled, this time with the girls choosing which boy they'd like to couple up with. Andrew and Tasha, Dami and Indiyah, and Gemma and Luca all remained together, whilst Paige got back with Jacques, Ekin-Su picked Davide again, Danica picked Jay, and Antigoni chose Charlie.
Week 4	Challenges	On Day 22, the boys and girls went head-to-head to raise their opposing team's heart rate. At the end of the game they found out who raised their heart rate the most.
Week 4	Dates	On Day 24, all of the couples had brunch dates in the garden.; On Day 25, Ekin-Su and Davide left the villa to go on a date.
Week 4	Exits	On Day 25, after receiving the fewest public votes, Antigoni, Danica and Tasha, and Andrew, Charlie and Jay were in danger of being dumped. The remaining Islanders had to choose one boy and one girl to dump from the island. The boys chose Antigoni, whilst the girls chose Charlie.
Week 5	Entrances	On Day 27, Cheyanne, Chyna, Coco, Jazmine, Mollie and Summer entered the villa as part of Casa Amor.
Week 5	Coupling	On Day 31, the original Islanders were told that they would be re-coupling. They were only given the option to remain in their current couple or to choose one of the new Islanders. However, as the boys and the girls were living in separate villas, they were not aware of what the other one chose. If one decided to re-couple and the other did not, then they would be single but still remain on the island. If both re-coupled then they would both remain in the villa with their new partner, and any remaining single new islanders would be dumped. Davide and Ekin-Su, Jacques and Paige, and Luca and Gemma remained together, whilst Andrew picked Coco, Dami chose Summer, Danica opted with Josh, Indiyah coupled up with Deji, Jay went with Chyna, and Tasha chose Billy.
Week 5	Challenges	On Day 27, the Main Villa and Casa Amor competed in "Raunchy Races" where they had to complete a certain task quicker than the other villa. The game was won by Casa Amor, therefore they won a party for that evening.
Week 5	Exits	On Day 31, new islanders Cheyanne, George, Jack, Jazmine, Mollie and Samuel were dumped from the island after failing to couple up.
Week 6	Entrances	On Day 36, Adam entered the villa.
Week 6	Coupling	On Day 38, the islanders recoupled. This time it was the boys choosing which girl they'd like to be coupled up with. Davide and Ekin-Su, and Luca and Gemma remained together, whilst Andrew and Tasha, and Dami and Indiyah reunited. Adam chose Paige, Billy picked Danica, Deji coupled up with Coco, and Josh went with Summer.
Week 6	Challenges	On Day 40, the Islanders took part in "Mad Movies" in a Boys vs Girls pub quiz challenge where they had to answer sex related questions. The team who answered correctly were able to select a movie from the list which featured a clip of another Islander.
Week 6	Dates	On Day 37, new boy Adam was able to choose three girls to date on the Hideaway terrace. He chose Summer, Danica and Paige.; On Day 38, Gemma and Luca left the villa to go on their first date.
Week 6	Exits	On Day 35, after receiving the fewest public votes, Dami and Summer, and Jay and Chyna were at risk of being dumped. It was then down to the remaining islanders to decide which couple to dump. They chose Jay and Chyna.; On Day 37, Jacques decided to voluntarily leave the villa.; On Day 39, after receiving the fewest public votes, Coco and Josh were dumped from the island.
Week 7	Entrances	On Day 45, Jamie, Lacey, Nathalia and Reece entered the villa.
Week 7	Coupling	On Day 47, the islanders recoupled. This time it was the girls choosing which boy they'd like to be coupled up with. Adam and Paige, Andrew and Tasha, Dami and Indiyah, Davide and Ekin-Su, and Luca and Gemma all remained together. Danica picked Jamie, Lacey chose Deji, and Nathalia coupled up with Reece.
Week 7	Challenges	On Day 42, the islanders took part in "Suck and Blow", where they had to pass around a card to each other using their mouths. Any islander who dropped the card then had to complete a dare.; On Day 43, the islanders competed in the "Snog, Marry, Pie" challenge where each islander had to snog, marry and pie an islander of the opposite gender.; On Day 47, the boys took part in "You've Got Male" where they went round a course with postage themed obstacles. The girls chose Dami as the winner.
Week 7	Dates	On Day 46, the four new islanders were able to pick one islander each to take on dates. Jamie picked Danica, Lacey went with Deji, Nathalia dated Adam, and Recce chose Ekin-Su.
Week 7	Exits	On Day 44, after receiving the fewest public votes, Billy and Dami, and Danica and Summer were in danger of being dumped. The remaining Islanders had to choose one boy and one girl to dump from the island. The boys chose Summer, whilst the girls chose Billy.
Week 8	Challenges	On Day 51, the girls took part in "Mile High" where they went took part in a number of flight themed challenges.; On Day 52, the couples were challenged with becoming parents and looking after a doll. The challenge was won by Dami and Indiyah.
Week 8	Dates	On Day 53, Adam and Paige, Dami and Indiyah, and Davide and Ekin-Su went on their final dates.; On Day 54, Andrew and Tasha, and Luca and Gemma went on their final dates.
Week 8	Exits	On Day 49, having received the fewest public votes for most compatible couple, Deji and Lacey, and Reece and Nathalia were dumped from the island.; On Day 51, after receiving the fewest public votes, Danica and Jamie were dumped from the island.
Week 9	Exits	On Day 56, following the islanders voted for the two least compatible couples, Adam and Paige, Andrew and Tasha, Davide and Ekin-Su, and Luca and Gemma, who all received votes went head-to-head with each other in a public vote to save. It was then revealed that having received the fewest public votes, Adam and Paige had been dumped.; On Day 58, Andrew and Tasha finished in fourth place and Dami and Indiyah finished third. Davide and Ekin-Su were then voted the winners, leaving Luca and Gemma as runners-up.

== Ratings ==
Official ratings are taken from BARB. Because the Saturday episodes are "Unseen Bits" episodes rather than nightly highlights, these are not included in the overall averages. Viewing figures are consolidated 7-day viewing figures with pre-broadcast viewing and viewing on tablets, PCs and smartphones included.

	Viewers (millions)								
	Week 1	Week 2	Week 3	Week 4	Week 5	Week 6	Week 7	Week 8	Week 9
Sunday		4.56	4.37	4.50	4.62	4.52	5.06	4.31	4.12
Monday	4.98	4.51	4.53	4.69	4.61	4.64	4.73	4.42	4.10
Tuesday	4.52	4.45	4.67	4.81	4.49	4.70	4.59	4.11	
Wednesday	4.22	4.22	4.46	4.58	4.54	4.45	4.65	4.07	
Thursday	4.11	4.32	4.79	4.20	5.30	4.21	4.78	3.80	
Friday	4.12	4.26	4.59	4.64	4.90	4.58	4.66	3.71	
Weekly average	4.39	4.39	4.57	4.57	4.74	4.52	4.75	4.07	4.11
Running average	4.39	4.39	4.45	4.48	4.53	4.53	4.56	4.50	4.46
Series average	4.46								
