= Keevil =

Village in Wiltshire, England

Coordinates: 51.321°N 2.115°W

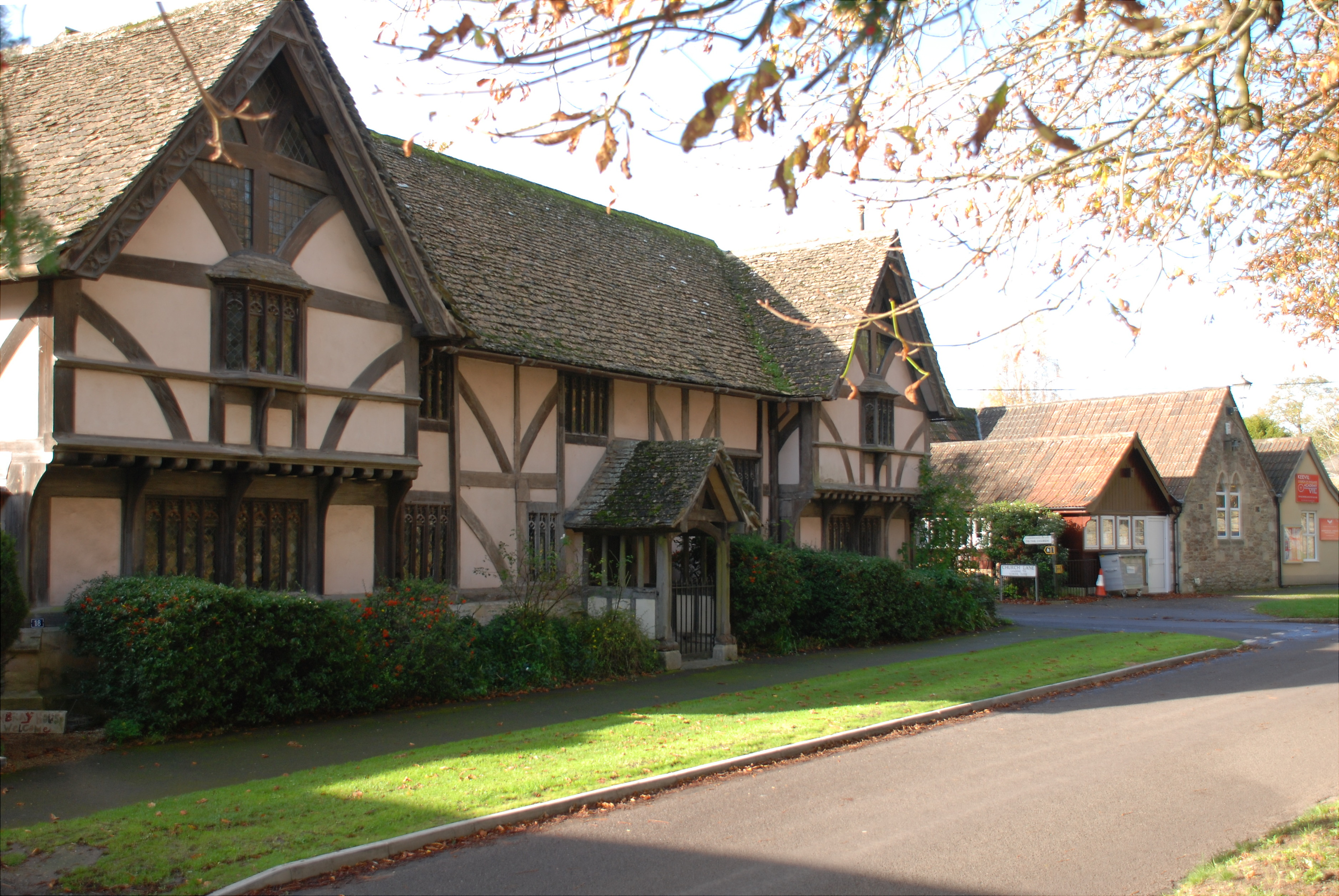
- Talboys (left) and part of primary school, Main Street, Keevil

- Location within Wiltshire
- Population: 441 (in 2011)
- OS grid reference: ST921580
- Civil parish: Keevil
- Unitary authority: Wiltshire
- Ceremonial county: Wiltshire
- Region: South West
- Country: England
- Sovereign state: United Kingdom
- Post town: Trowbridge
- Postcode district: BA14
- Dialling code: 01380
- Police: Wiltshire
- Fire: Dorset and Wiltshire
- Ambulance: South Western
- UK Parliament: Melksham and Devizes
- Website: Parish Council

Keevil is a village and civil parish in Wiltshire, England, about 4 miles (6 km) east of the centre of Trowbridge and a similar distance south of Melksham. The village lies on a slope between Great Hinton and Bulkington. Semington Brook forms much of the northeast boundary of the parish.

In the far north of the parish, on the A361, is the hamlet of The Strand.

== History ==
A settlement of 42 households at Chivele was recorded in the Domesday Book of 1086, when the land was held by Ernulf de Hesdin. His son, also Ernulf, held the manor in 1130; it passed through various hands until it was sold in 1560 by Henry, Earl of Arundel to Richard Lambert, a grocer of London. His brother's grandson sold the manor to William Beach in 1681. In 1790 the estate was inherited by Henrietta Maria Beach; she married Michael Hicks of Beverston Castle, Gloucestershire, who took the additional surname of Beach. Their grandson W. A. Hicks Beach sold the property in 1911.

Two mills were recorded in the Domesday Book and two, presumably the same, were granted to Romsey Abbey by Ernulf. These were on the Semington Brook, one at Gayford (upstream of Bulkington near the present Mill Farm) and the other near Baldham Bridge (in the northeast of Keevil parish). Although there were other mills on the brook, only these two survived into recent times. The Gayford mill was used for cloth working until the early 20t century, while that at Baldham was a water-powered flour mill in 1965 and is now a residence.

A school was built in the village in 1868, at the expense of Mrs Chamberlaine, the vicar's wife, and by 1894 was also attended by children from Bulkington. Children of all ages were educated until 1941, when those over 11 transferred to schools in Trowbridge. The school gained voluntary controlled status in 1950, and continues as Keevil Church of England Academy.

== Religious sites ==
=== Parish church ===
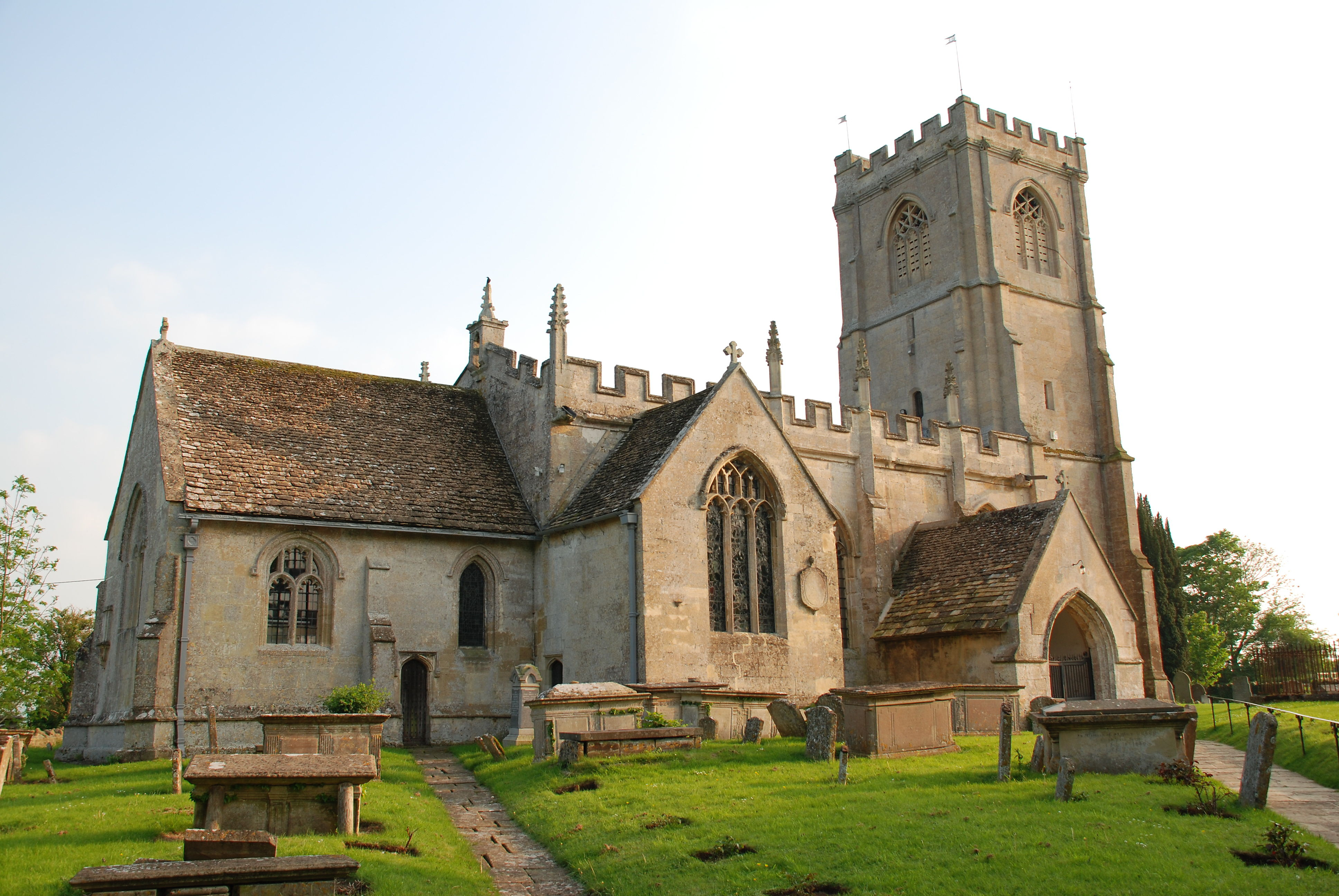
St Leonard's Church

There was a church at Keevil in the late 11th century, which was granted to Shaftesbury Abbey by Ernulf de Hesdin. Robert de Leycestre, later a judge in Ireland, was presented with the living in 1347. In 1393 the rectory and advowson were conveyed to the Bonhommes of Edington Priory. After the Dissolution, in 1541, the rectory and advowson were granted to Winchester Cathedral, and this continues to the present day.

The oldest parts of the present Church of England parish church of St Leonard are single-light lancet windows from the late 13th century, in the north and south walls of the chancel. The church was extended and enlarged in the 15th and early 16th centuries, when the south aisle was added; the building was restored in the 1860s and c. 1910. The organ was installed in 1909.

There is a 14th-century sanctus bell and a ring of six bells, including two dated 1609 and two dated 1761 by Thomas Bilbie II. The church was designated as Grade II* listed in 1968.

In 1869 the Ecclesiastical Commissioners described the benefice as "the vicarage of Keevil with the chapelry of Bulkington annexed". A small church, Christ Church, was built in 1860 to serve the tithing of Bulkington, in the east of the parish, which became a separate civil parish in the 1880s while remaining part of Keevil ecclesiastical parish. This connection was broken in 1971 when Bulkington was united with Seend parish.

Keevil last had a resident vicar in 1970; from 1972 the benefice was held in plurality with Steeple Ashton. Today the benefice is united with St James, Trowbridge.

=== Early church ===
The site of the 11th-century church may have been in the area known as Cooplechurch field, about half a mile east of Steeple Ashton church. Foundations and nearby burials were excavated in 1913; the site is now within the airfield and nothing is visible.

=== Methodist chapel ===
Methodists met in Keevil from 1783, and by 1829 there was also a congregation at Bulkington. A red brick chapel was built in 1833 in the northeast of Keevil village, to which a Sunday schoolroom was added in 1901. The chapel closed in 1988 and became a private house.

== Landmarks ==
The parish has two Grade I listed buildings, both in the centre of the village. Keevil Manor, across the road from the church, was built c. 1580 for the Lambert family. Two stories and an attic are faced with limestone ashlar at the four-gabled front, while a central two-storey porch of 1611 carries Tuscan columns. English Heritage describes the house as "a fine example of a Wiltshire manor house retaining especially rich fittings". Also Grade I listed are the boundary wall to Main Street, of c. 1600, about two metres in height, with gate piers at the southwest entrance and an arched doorway in line with the manor's porch; and an inner garden wall in front of the house, probably 1611.

The second Grade I listed house, Talboys, is described by Nikolaus Pevsner as "A timber-framed house of great charm and value, although some of its features are deceptive". The centre and right (west) wing are late 14th century to mid 15th but the left wing was added in 1876 to match; the whole was restored in 1899.

The former vicarage, Field Head, today a private residence, was built in 1842 by Reverend Pooke and enlarged in 1869. In the western part of the village are several timber-framed houses including Little Talboys, a cruck-framed house with four bays.

The Trowbridge–Devizes section of the A361 crosses the north of the parish. At the parish boundary in the northeast the road crosses Semington Brook at Baldham Bridge; there has been a bridge here since the 14th century but the present two-arched ashlar bridge is from the mid-18th.

After the Second World War, the barracks of RAF Keevil were used as a temporary home for Polish refugees. For a time the airfield was used for gliding at weekends, as the base of Bannerdown Gliding Club; it is now under Army control and used by the Joint Aviation Command.
