= Robert de Leycestre =

English cleric, judge and Crown official

Robert, or Henry de Leycestre (died after 1369) was an English cleric, judge and Crown official, who held office as Master of the Rolls in Ireland.

Little is known of his early life, although his surname suggests that he was born in Leicester. Ball gives his first name as Robert, but in official records, he is usually called Henry. He may have enjoyed the patronage of Richard FitzAlan, 10th Earl of Arundel, since the living of Keevil, Wiltshire, to which he was presented in 1347, was in the Earl's gift.

He is first heard of in 1332 as a member of the household of Eleanor of Woodstock, sister of King Edward III; presumably he played a part in the preparations for her marriage to Reginald II, Duke of Guelders, in May of that year, and may have accompanied her to Guelders.

In 1350 he was sent to Ireland as Master of the Rolls: his full title was "Keeper of the Rolls and other memoranda of the Chancery of Ireland". In 1352 he became second chamberlain of the Exchequer of Ireland, although the appointment was later revoked on the ground that it had been a "mistake". In 1368, the Privy Council of Ireland ordered payment to him of £10, in part payment of £20 owing to him for services rendered. He was still alive and in office at Easter 1369 when the Council ordered payment to him of another £10.
