= Scilly Boys =

Rowing team

The Scilly Boys was a four-man rowing team who, in June 2008, attempted to beat the trans-Atlantic rowing record but were capsized due to a storm. The group consisted of Chris Jenkins, Tim Garratt, Wayne Davey and Joby Newton.

== Background ==
The idea for the group to row the Atlantic was started while in the pub. The row was done in aid of several charities, with each member of the team sponsoring a charity: Chris Jenkins, a member of the Isles of Scilly RNLI lifeboat crew, sponsored a charity wishing to improve Bristol’s special care baby unit; Tim Garratt sponsored Breakthrough Breast Cancer; Wayne Davey, a paramedic, sponsored the Royal National Lifeboat Institution (RNLI); and Joby Newton sponsored the Cornwall Air Ambulance.

== Row ==
=== Preparations ===
Prior to the row, in December 2007, the team completed a sea survival course with the RNLI at the Lifeboat College in Poole, as part of the charity’s support of the row.

=== Departure ===
The team departed New York from Liberty Landing Marina on 1 June at 10:00.

=== Capsize and rescue ===
Thirteen days into the row, at 01:00 BST, Falmouth Coastguard was alerted by the team via satellite phone that the Scilly Boys had capsized due to low visibility and high winds, leading to a rescue operation. The United States Coast Guard, once alerted, coordinated the rescue and a merchant ship, the Gulf Grace, and a Lockheed C-130 Hercules aircraft were sent to the boat's last known position.

=== Return ===
After disembarking the Gulf Grace in Gibraltar, the team flew back to the United Kingdom, arriving at Penzance Quay to board the RMV Scillonian III which would take them back home to the Isles of Scilly.

== Response ==
The BBC series An Island Parish filmed a special episode documenting the group's experience.
