= Adam Collard =

English television personality and fitness coach (born 1995)

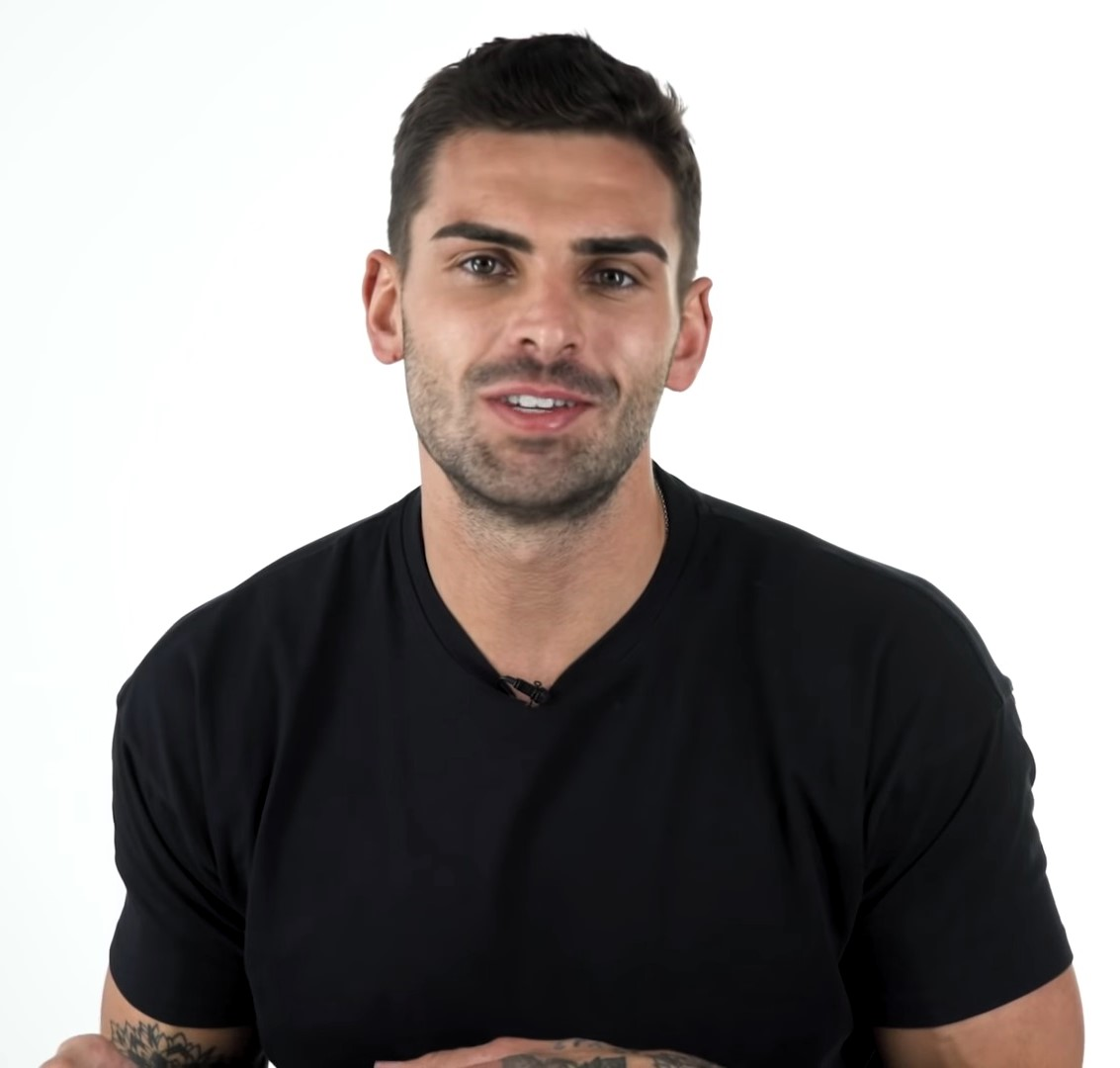
- Collard in 2019
- Born: Adam Elliott Collard; 26 October 1995 (age 30); Newcastle upon Tyne, England
- Occupations: Television personality; fitness coach
- Television: Love Island; Celebs Go Dating
- Partner(s): Laura Woods (2023–present; engaged)
- Children: 1

Adam Elliott Collard (born 26 October 1995) is an English television personality and fitness coach, known for his appearances as a contestant on the fourth and eighth series of Love Island in 2018 and 2022 respectively. In 2023, he appeared on Celebs Go Dating. In 2025 he appeared in Celebrity SAS: Who Dares Wins.

== Life and career ==
Adam Elliott Collard was born on 26 October 1995 in Newcastle upon Tyne. Prior to appearing on Love Island, he worked as a personal trainer, later working as an online fitness coach and running his own personal training business, The Sculpt Academy. In 2018, Collard became a contestant on the fourth series of Love Island. He entered as the first "bombshell" on Day 1, and had to steal a girl of his choice, which was ultimately Kendall-Rae Knight. During his time in the villa, he was coupled up with a further three girls, Rosie Williams, Zara McDermott and Darylle Thomas, the last of whom he was dumped alongside on Day 33. His behaviour during the series sparked criticism from charity Women's Aid, who condemned him for his "gaslighting" behaviour.

In 2022, Collard returned to the Love Island villa as a "bombshell" in the eighth series, four years after his original appearance. He was the first person in the show's history to appear as a contestant twice in separate series. His return was again criticised by Women's Aid, who called for ITV to "crack down on emotionally abusive behaviour". Collard was dumped from the villa alongside Paige Thorne two days before the final. In 2023, Collard was announced to be participating in the twelfth series of the E4 dating series Celebs Go Dating.

After beginning a relationship in 2023, Collard became engaged to sports presenter Laura Woods in July 2024, and in September, Woods revealed she was pregnant with the couple's first child.

In 2025, Collard was named in the line-up for Celebrity SAS: Who Dares Wins.

== Filmography ==
As himself
Year	Title	Notes	Ref.
2018, 2022	Love Island	Contestant; series 4, series 8	
2018, 2022	Lorraine	Guest; 3 episodes	
2023	Celebs Go Dating	Cast member; series 12	
2025	Celebrity SAS Who Dares Wins	Contestant; Series 7	
