= Laura Woods (English presenter) =

English television presenter (born 1987)

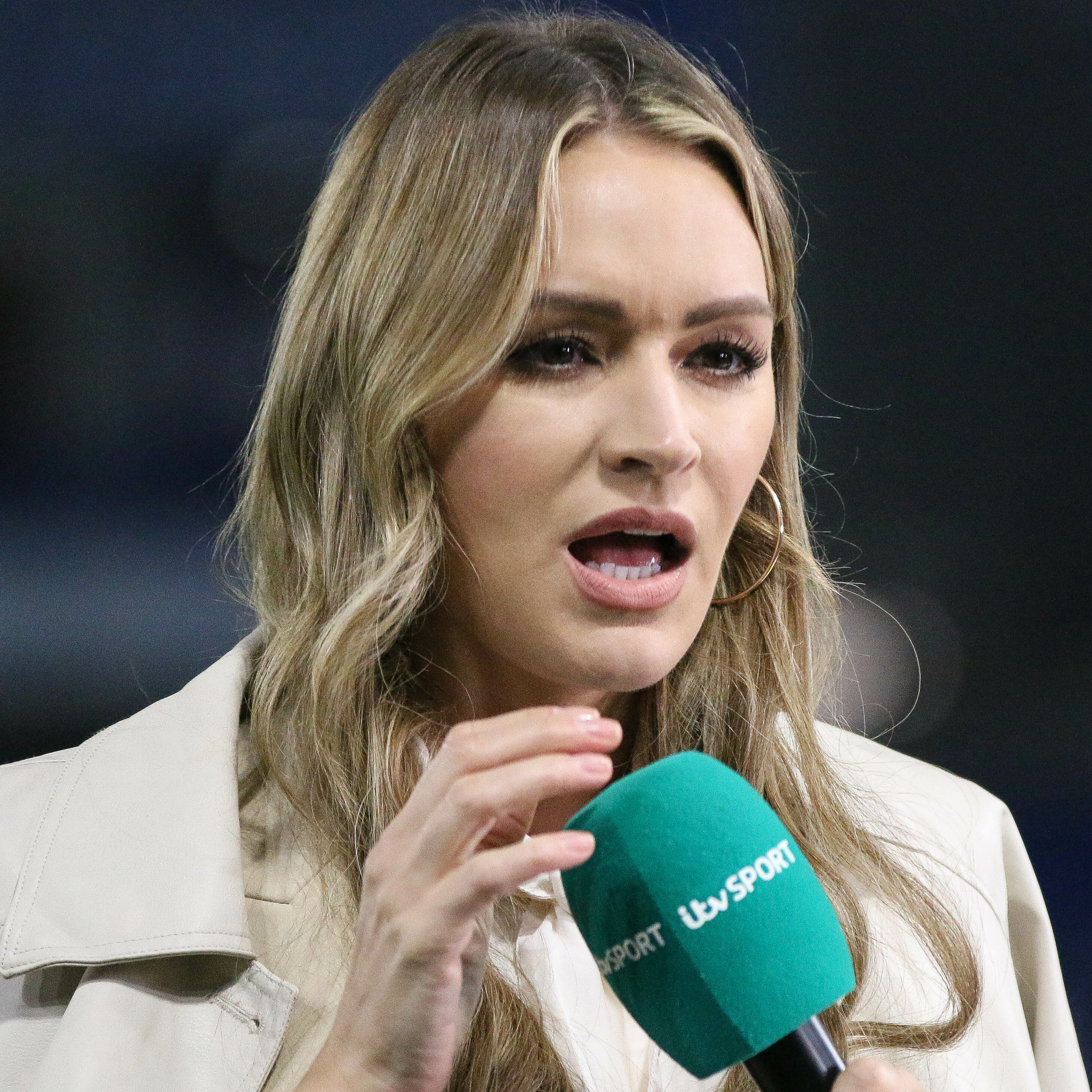
- Woods in 2022
- Born: 2 July 1987 (age 39); Dagenham, London, England
- Education: Kingston University
- Occupations: Television presenter; reporter; journalist
- Employer(s): ITV, TNT Sports
- Partner(s): Adam Collard (2023–present; engaged)
- Children: 1

Laura Woods (born 2 July 1987) is an English presenter working for ITV, Amazon Prime Video, and TNT Sports.

== Early life and education ==
Laura Woods was born on 2 July 1987 in Dagenham, London, England. She studied print journalism at Kingston University.

In January 2026, Woods was made an Honorary Doctor of Art at Kingston University in recognition of her outstanding contribution to journalism and promoting women in sport.

== Career ==
=== Television ===
After graduating from university, Woods got a job at Sky Sports as a runner in 2009, working her way up to editorial assistant, then into production as assistant producer, associate producer and producer.

She started presenting by doing behind-the-scenes interviews on the darts coverage for Sky Sports' YouTube channel.

Woods then got a job on the Saturday morning kids' show Game Changers. From there she started reporting on the NFL and joined the Soccer AM online presenting team, which included a trip to Euro 2016 in France where she broadcast live on Facebook every day.

By 2018, Woods became a regular pitch-side reporter on Super Sunday, occasionally reporting with Gary Neville. She left Sky Sports in 2022.

Woods also worked for DAZN, as part of their coverage of boxing and the Women's Champions League. In July 2023, she left the company.

On 17 August 2022, it was announced that Woods would be joining Osi Umenyiora and Jason Bell on an hour-long NFL highlights show every Friday on ITV. On 7 September 2023, she was replaced by Craig Doyle.

On 18 July 2023, Woods joined TNT Sports (formerly BT Sport) as the lead presenter for the UEFA Champions League and the boxing coverage.

Woods was the lead presenter of ITV's coverage of the 2023 FIFA Women's World Cup.

=== Radio ===
In March 2020, Woods was announced as the main presenter for Talksport's breakfast show, presenting Monday to Wednesday, with Thursdays and Fridays presented by Alan Brazil.

On 14 June 2023, Woods announced that she was leaving the breakfast show. Her final show was on 28 June 2023.

== Personal life ==
Woods dated former England rugby player Alex Corbisiero for eight years. She is engaged to Adam Collard; their son was born in January 2025.

She is a supporter of Arsenal.

In February 2024, it was revealed that Woods was harassed and stalked for two years by a female football fan who threatened to kill her dog and sent her an STI kit in the post. The stalker was sentenced to 14 months in prison and placed on a restraining order.

On 2 December 2025, Woods collapsed on air while presenting ITV's coverage of England's women's friendly against Ghana at St Mary's Stadium in Southampton. She was assisted by colleagues, Ian Wright and Anita Asante, and medical staff before the programme cut to a break. Woods later said that paramedics believed the incident was caused by a virus, and her fiancé Adam Collard reassured viewers that she was recovering.
