= Jamie Allen (priest) =

English Anglican priest

Timothy James Allen (born 1971) is a British Anglican priest, who from 2009 to 2016 was Dean of Taranaki Cathedral, New Zealand.

== In England ==
=== Early ministry ===
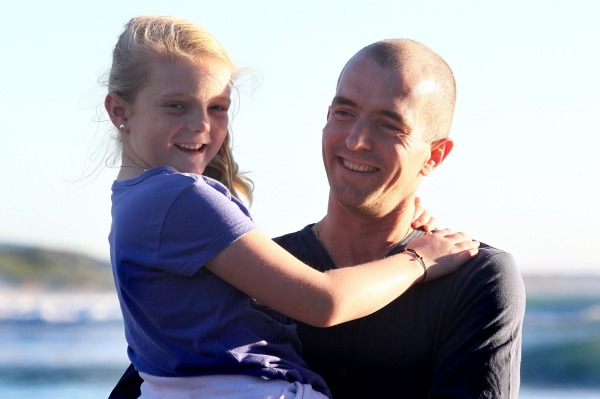
Jamie Allen with daughter Carrie

Allen was raised in Woodbridge, Suffolk. He was ordained as an Anglican priest in 1999, at the age of 28, after first working as a DJ and as a Religious Education and English teacher. He was a curate for three years at St Mary's Abbey in the parish of Nuneaton, Warwickshire until 2002, when he was appointed Rector of Seend, Bulkington and Poulshot, a group of parishes in Wiltshire.

=== "A Country Parish" ===
Allen and his family were the subject of an eight-part Tiger Aspect Productions British television documentary and reality television programme A Country Parish, first broadcast in 2003. This covered the family's move from Nuneaton to three traditional village parishes in Wiltshire. The series was filmed over the course of a year, and examined the life of a clergy family and the dilemmas of parish ministry. The series included themes such as:

- The re-uniting of an estranged family
- Fox hunting and Allen's decision not to bless the hounds and horses prior to the opening meet, and the community's response to this
- Loss and grief, through the story of a missing pet dog, and through deaths and funerals in the parish
- Allen's taking part in a Peace March against the backdrop of a village having many retired military personnel

The series attracted a large viewing audience and there was huge media attention and interest. In 2003 Jamie moved from Wiltshire and resumed ministry in a less-publicized location. He served as a priest in Buckinghamshire before becoming the vicar of St Andrew's Parish in Great Cornard in late 2005.

== In New Zealand ==
In 2010, Allen moved with his wife and four children to be vicar, and then dean, of the newly consecrated Taranaki Cathedral Church of St Mary, New Plymouth, New Zealand. The cathedral was consecrated on 6 March 2010, and Allen was installed as its first dean.

=== Carrie Allen ===
In 2009, Allen's second child, Carrie, had been diagnosed with rhabdomyosarcoma, a rare form of soft-tissue cancer. She was treated with chemotherapy and radiotherapy, and surgery to remove the lump in her arm. The family moved to New Zealand just as Carrie completed this treatment, and for some time the cancer was in remission, but it returned metastatically in 2011. In 2012, a fundraising concert (called "Carrie's Concert") was held at Taranaki Cathedral hosted by Carrie, where Dave Dobbyn performed and over $8,000 was raised to benefit the Child Cancer Foundation and CanTeen.

Carrie died on 15 September 2012. As her father was the serving dean at the cathedral, permission was granted for the closed churchyard to be re-opened for her burial.

=== Taranaki Cathedral ===
From 2009 to 2016 Allen served as Dean of Taranaki Cathedral. Events during his incumbency included:

- Establishing the parish church as a cathedral. This was expressed through the weaving of an altar frontal to peace, all sewn by visitors, and depicting the 39 communities of the region (around which he did a pilgrimage with a local museum curator)
- Reading the entire Bible aloud (with only 5 minute breaks) as a fundraiser
- The relocation of historic hatchments from the walls of the cathedral; war emblems which were a cause of pain to Māori and many others
- The establishment of a Garden of Remembrance featuring large emblems of Peace from the Māori community of Parihaka
- The restoration of many graves in the historic churchyard, and the installation of floodlighting to light the cathedral (in colour, according to the season) by night
- Forming a link between Taranaki Cathedral and Coventry Cathedral, through becoming a member of the international community of the Cross of Nails
- The closure of the cathedral and relocation of activities to the hall, following a report on the structural integrity of the building

=== Taranaki Retreat ===
In July 2014, prompted by the loss of their daughter, the Allens decided to sell their family home and use the funds to establish a charitable trust which would offer a place for people to stay when going through tragedy, with the specific aim of suicide prevention. This was inspired by Allen's experience of pastoral work with families who had lost a member to suicide when there was nowhere to turn to for support. The build of the facility was funded by the Allens' donation, by local businesses, people in the community who had been affected by suicide, and through grants.

The facility opened in March 2017 and offers free breaks (or support at home) for people dealing with tragedy or where people are dealing with suicidal thoughts. The Allen family were nominated and chosen as Taranaki Daily News Person of the year 2017 for their work on Taranaki Retreat.

=== Waimanako ===
During 2021, a Community Drop-In Support Hub was established in Taranaki by Allen and the Taranaki Retreat Team, to operate alongside the Residential Support Centre. The name Waimanako/The Waters of Hope was gifted to the premises - which are sponsored by New Plymouth District Council. The facility includes support rooms, a Creative Hub and a Koha Cafe, where people can eat for free or for a donation. The facility operates from 10am-9pm daily except Sundays. The cafe offers a peer-listening services for people experiencing distress, or concerned for someone. "Listening Ears" can simply be added to an order for food. There are regular support groups, workshops and one-on-one peer support and therapy available.
