= The Village (1993 TV series) =

British television series

The Village (1993) is a television series about the life and times of the villagers of Bentley, Hampshire, from 1993 to 2001.

It was initially broadcast as a radio programme on BBC Radio 4, Christmas 1990, and continued in 1991, 1992 and 1993 – a total of 50 radio broadcasts. A book was also written by Nigel Farrell, covering the original Radio 4 episodes: The Village: The Early Years (ISBN 978-0-563-38311-6).

Due to the success of the radio broadcast, the TV series began filming in summer 1993 and was broadcast on 3 October 1993 by ITV Meridian, later to be shown on BBC 2 and Sky. It was also exported to Australian and Norwegian TV. The series was produced by Paul Sommers for Tiger Aspect Productions. It was directed and narrated by Nigel Farrell. It ran for 102 episodes.

== Cast ==
The Top 10 Cast (in order of appearance)

Name	Description	Episodes
Simmi (Riall) Player	Swiss Beautician	76
Tony Holmes	Farmer	74
Pinkie Salmon	Policeman	34
Mary Thomson	Captain Thomson's wife	62
Captain Andrew Thomson	Submarine Captain (Retired)	62
Terry Cox	Bentley Stores delivery man	46
Joan Cox	Terry Cox's wife	35
Jumbo Fuller	Tony Holmes' brother in law	45
Dave	The Plumber / Elvis impersonator	39
Les Player	Software developer and entrepreneur	63

== Episodes ==
The date shown is the date first broadcast on Meridian TV. The events in the series had occurred in the previous 6–12 months prior to broadcast.

Series	Episode	Date	Content
1	1	3 October 1993	The Village Fete 1993. Simmi joins a dating agency. A new village bobby appears in the village.
1	2	10 October 1993	Simmi goes on first date at agency. Pam Holmes plans parachute jump
1	3	17 October 1993	Terry Cox planning to win cup at Fete. Preparations for the fete start
1	4	24 October 1993	Pam Holmes makes parachute jump. Bentley Fete opens. Cow Pat lottery with Claire the Coe. Simmi does face painting at fete.
1	5	31 October 1993	Hop pickers arrive. Simmi meets John on second date at the village fete – but it's the last. Alan Wheatley has doubts about future of the village stores.
1	6	7 November 1993	Alan Wheatley plans to cut the stores in half. Simmi searches the dating agency again. The by-pass work starts.
2	1	20 April 1994	The Star pub changes gets a new landlord. Elvis (Dave the Plumber) looks at Pinkie's plumbing.
2	2	4 May 1994	Pinkie lies in wait for burglars at Bentley stores. The threat to local business by the new bypass. Pinkie shops for baby clothes.
2	3	11 May 1994	Debbie Salmon is pregnant. The pheasant shoot.
2	4	18 May 1994	Tony wants to dig gravel from his land to build a by-pass, but neighbour and brother-in-law, Jumbo objects.
2	5	25 April 1994	The Balloon flight. Chris Holmes plans his marriage – but to Sarah a 'townie'
2	6	1 June 1994	
3	1	30 October 1994	Dave the Plumber announces marriage to Dee. Jumbo plans action against gravel extraction to build by-pass.
3	2	6 November 1994	The girl with no belly button.
3	3	13 November 1994	Simmi's new boyfriend has a surprise for Simmi. Les moving from Germany to Bentley to set up new business. Elvis (Dave the Plumber) sings.
3	4	20 November 1994	Will Les propose? Simmi's mum arrives from Switzerland to meet Les. Simmi and Les view new offices on Bentley Industrial Estate. New police woman arrives in Bentley.
3	5	27 November 1994	WPC Woodcock arrives. Les and Simmi's software arrives and move into new offices. Chris Holmes's stag night
3	6	4 December 1994	Preparations for Froyle pantomime – with WPC Sue Woodcock as Mother Goose
4	1	15 March 1995	Simmi and Les employ new staff, but no money to pay wages. Tony Holmes goes on fox hunt. Mary at The Bull pub needs staff. Chris Holmes's wedding preparations in Wales.
4	2	22 March 1995	Chris and Sarah's wedding in Wales. Simmi and Les prepare for computer fair at Olympia, London.
4	3	29 March 1995	Simmi and Les finally sell software at Olympia. Final rehearsal for Mother Goose. WPC Sue Woodcock gets bad news from Australia.
4	4	12 April 1995	WPC Sue Woodcock mother has heart attack in Australia. Mother Goose performs. Farmer Colin Meatyard announces end of his marriage. James Campbell the new vicar announced.
4	5	19 April 1995	Simmi and Les discuss the effects of contraception – and vasectomy. Colin Meatyard to sell dairy herd to settle his divorce. Will the bypass mean the end of Bentley stores?
4	6	26 April 1995	Les decides to have vasectomy. Bentley Bypass opens.
5	1	5 November 1995	Les has the vasectomy. Campaigns for local election candidates starts. Preparations for 100th villager fete starts.
5	2	12 November 1995	Simmi rushes to Switzerland to see her ill father. Local elections. Colin finds Lorraine in "lonely hearts" in Farmers Weekly.
5	3	19 November 1995	Election results. Simmi returns from Switzerland after her father dies. Marion explains about dyslexic children.
5	4	26 November 1995	Nicholas Parsons opens 100th Bentley fete. Marion to go to House of Lords to appeal against dyslexia laws. Thefts from allotments.
5	5	3 December 1995	Marion wins appeal at House of Lords re dyslexia laws and celebrates. Simmi's mum comes to stay. Tony wins election.
5	6	10 December 1995	WPC Sue Woodcock can't raise air fare to Australia. Simmi and Les expand office. Does Colin need to sell farm to pay ex-wife?
6	1	6 October 1996	Sue arrives in Australia to visit dying mother. Peter Blackman is new taxi driver in village. Simmi and Les take staff to Chequers pub. CSA chases Les.
6	2	13 October 1996	Letter from CSA for Les upsets Simmi. Sue asks why did her mother abandon her and move to Australia. Sarah announces that she will not give up Jon in London.
6	3	20 October 1996	Mark Christmas, on morale high due to Lords judgement gets new girlfriend. Star landlord to leave.
6	4	27 October 2006	Sue returns from Australia Nicky wants to be new landlord of Star pub. Marion meets Marks new girlfriend. Les divorce delayed. Tony Holmes has a weight problem.
6	5	3 November 1996	Bob Wilson and Nicky Meatyard are new landlord of the Star. Will Adrian the PI sponsor the Bentley football team. Bentley loses 6-2 leaving sponsorship is in doubt.
6	6	10 November 1996	Tony Holmes is diabetic. Sue investigates local signs being stolen. Star opens with Nicky and Bob as landlords.
6	7	17 November 1996	Les has problems collecting from bad debtors. Simmi has car crash and has to wear neck brace. Chequers get new French chef. Lorraine plans party for Colin.
6	8	24 November 1996	Les gets response from CSA. Colin has birthday party. Bentley cook book launched.
6	9	1 December 1996	Great crested newt found in the pond – but this is a problem for the ducks.
6	10	8 December 1996	Duck & Newt story gets into national press. Cook book content continues to grow.
6	11	15 December 1996	Is the Chequers haunted? Ducks get a reprieve. Les arranges printing of the Bentley cook book Tony Holmes's Sarah is pregnant.
6	12	22 December 1996	Cook book sales go well. Medium arrives at the Chequers.
7	1	5 October 1997	Simmi and Les decide to renovate their cottage, but wants ex-husband to do the work. Dave the Plumber has an accident.
7	2	12 October 1997	Simmi's ex Dick starts work on the cottage. Dave the Plumber goes to police station to explain what happened on stage.
7	3	19 October 1997	Les is critical about work by Dick at the cottage. Dave visits his solicitor about assault incident. Terry persuades Joan to go to the races. Dave sings at village show.
7	4	26 October 1997	Sue sings at village show. Andrew narrates at show.
7	5	2 November 1997	Lorraine wants to join the police force. Huge ugly surgery sign appears. Les and Simmi plan to expand the software business
7	6	9 November 1997	Lorraine takes police exam. Joan taken to hospital. Petition to remove ugly village road sign.
7	7	16 November 1997	Lorraine fails police entrance exam. Alan makes plans for the shop. Bentley road sign is removed.
7	8	23 November 1997	PC Sue Woodcock plans her retirement from police force. Simmi and Les announce their wedding plans. Les proposes on holiday in Turkey.
7	9	30 November 1997	Penny makes her will. Bentley fete opens. Les converting part of his office in the industrial estate for Simmi new salon. Sue in the stocks. Simmi and Les prepare their wedding list. Penny goes gliding.
7	10	7 December 1997	Tony in hospital. Andrew inspects sea cadets. Simmi and Les in-laws meet. Sue and Lorraine discuss strange lights in the sky. UFO in Hampshire?
7	11	14 December 1997	Sue believes lights are a UFO. Simmi's mum has doubts about wedding. Peter Blackman want to run the pub. Simmi and Les design their engagement ring. More UFOs.
7	12	21 December 1997	Peter Blackman is the new landlord of The Star. Sue plans her farewell party. Simmi listens to an old clairvoyants tape recording. Les picks up engagement ring. Sue has her party at The Star.
8	1	4 October 1998	Simmi and Les disagree about wedding. Sue moves out. WPC Sarah Wilcox comes to village. Dave wants to go to Gracelands.
8	2	11 October 1998	WPC Wilcox arrests someone for slashing tyres in village. Peter plans B&B in Bentley at The Star. Lorraine inherits some money and wants to invest in The Star pub.
8	3	18 October 1998	Dave is scared of flying to USA. Les and Simmi have their engagement dinner. Simmi plans to expand her salon.
8	4	25 October 1998	Dave books tickets for fear of flying course. Sarah and Phil move into the police house. Simmi plans her radio broadcasting career. Peter cleans up the B&B in The Star.
8	5	1 November 1998	Catherine passes her driving test. The Star gets its first B&B customer. Dave goes on his fear of flying course at Heathrow.
8	6	8 November 1998	Simmi records her pilot radio show – but it can't be edited. WPC Sarah issues speeding tickets in Bentley.
8	7	15 November 1998	Simmi's radio show gets rejected. Sue Woodcock opens the village fete. Simmi hears her mum has cancer and returns home to Switzerland. Tony and Jumbo go to paint ball range.
8	8	22 November 1998	Sarah gets married. Andrew gets upset about plan to build 100 homes in Bentley. Peter starts to receive nuisance calls. Simmi returns home to Bentley after her mum has operation.
8	9	29 November 1998	Hilda is upset by careless dogs and their owners fouling the footbaths. Campaign against new development continues. WPC Kedge identifies the nuisance calls to Peter.
8	10	6 December 1998	Will Tony sell land for development? Village pond needs cleaning, but there are no volunteers.
8	11	13 December 1998	The dog fouling officer starts fining offenders. Dee needs a hysterectomy. Community service offenders clean pond. Les plans Simmi 40th birthday to.....
8	12	20 December 1998	Tony collects his restored Morris Minor. Dee's operation is a success. Simmi and Les set off on surprise trip – 1st class.
9	1	13 October 1999	Les takes Simmi to Paris for 40th birthday, but Simmi just wants to go shopping. Les has problems with his French. Les proposes to Simmi. Colin sells his dairy herd.
9	2	20 October 1999	Colins language puts off buyers. Alan seeks loan from bank to improve the village stores. Tony and Jumbo have a car race.
9	3	27 October 1999	Alan has meeting with bank manager and gets loan. The great car race continues.
9	4	2 November 1999	Tony wins the great car race. Alans starts to split his shop into two – but there are delays. Simmi and Les argue about details of their marriage plans.
9	5	10 November 1999	Les and Simmi choose outfit for the wedding – but Les must lose weight. Terry and Joan have their 50th wedding anniversary party.
9	6	17 November 1999	Les continues his diet and takes up exercising. Peter starts clamping non patrons in the pub car park. Dave fails to get on Stars in their Eyes. Mary works on Simmi's wedding dress
9	7	24 November 1999	Les loses enough weight to get married. Jumbo discovers a strange plant in garden – is it legal? Dave performs as Elvis at The Star pub. Colin parks his tractor in pub car park.
9	8	1 December 1999	Les and Simmi check out wedding venues and then collects Simmi's mum from airport. As Simmi invites her ex-husband, Les invites his ex-wife Melanie to Wedding. WPC Sarah announces she is pregnant.
9	9	8 December 1999	The Star loses customers to The Chequers. Andrew and Mary prepare surprise for Hilda's 80th. Les goes to his quiet stag night while Simmi has a wild hen night.
9	10	15 December 1999	Simmi has a hangover from the hen night. Hilda's surprise party with a "This is Your Life" presentation.
9	11	22 December 1999	Simmi is nervous prior to the wedding, while Les has to work late. Peter upgrades the facilities at The Star.
9	12	29 December 1999	Simmi's and Les' wedding.
10	1	19 October 2000	The not blinking competition announced. Les and Simmi get stressed in their software business, but Simmi introduces Feng Shui.
10	2	26 Oc6 2000	PC Pinky leaves the police to run the local pub. Simmi applies Feng Shui. Terry relives his life driving a steam train.
10	3	2 November 2000	
10	4	9 November 2000	
10	5	16 November 2000	
10	6	23 November 2000	
10	7	30 December 2000	
10	8	7 December 2000	
10	9	14 December 2000	
10	10	21 December 2000	
10	11	28 December 2000	
10	12	4 January 2001	
11	1	16 August 2001	
11	2	23 August 2001	
11	3	30 August 2001	
11	4	6 September 2001	
11	5	13 September 2001	
11	6	20 September 2001	
11	7	27 September 2001	PC Sarah moves out of the police house. Tony discusses his portrait. Bob plans his taxi trap.
11	8	4 October 2001	Bob meets his competition. Simmi and Les plan to rescue the village fete's lack of a cow.
11	9	11 October 2001	
11	10	18 October 2001	
11	11	15 November 2001	Hop picking. Captain Thompson and Mary continue to edit their Bentley book. Pinkie, the Star pub landlord, receives hate mail. Simmi and Les decide on future of the software business.
11	12	22 November 2001	Les gets overwhelming interest at exhibition. Pinkie suspects everyone as source of poison-pen letter. Captain Thompson completes his Official History of Bentley book. Mary remembers times past.
