= Nigel Farrell =

British television filmmaker (1953–2011)

Nigel George Farrell, born on 22 January 1953 in London, died 24 September 2011, was a television documentary film-maker who was a pioneer in what has been termed 'docu-soaps'. He initially followed his father into medicine, but soon entered the world of television via local journalism. He worked on programmes such as South Today and Breakfast Time, and on BBC Radio 4 appeared on Ned Sherrin’s Saturday evening show Loose Ends.

He will primarily be remembered for a 50-programme Radio 4 series called The Village (which went on to become a television series); three series of Country House set at Woburn Abbey, An Island Parish, which evolved from A Country Parish, launched in 2001 on BBC Two and a series on Channel 4 called A Place In France. He also directed and presented a 1991 TV documentary film about passengers on one of the British freight ships plying between the UK and the Caribbean, Banana Boat.

== Bibliography ==
Farrell wrote several books based on his experiences and as tie-ins for his television series'.

- TV & Radio: Everybody's Soapbox (1983) with Bruce Parker, Blandford Press ISBN 0713713372
- Smile It’s Only Television (1984), Blandford Press ISBN 0713714042
- How to be a Commuter : and Survive! (1986), Javelin Books ISBN 0713717092
- Fatherhood - The Awful Truth (1987), Javelin Books ISBN 0713718978
- The Village: The Early Years (1996), BBC Books ISBN 0563383119
- A Place in France : An Indian Summer (2004) with Reza Mahammad, Macmillan ISBN 0330431390

== Personal life ==
Educated at Christ's Hospital School in Sussex, he was the son of a doctor. Farrell had three children, Thomas, Alexandra and Georgina, from his 1977 marriage to Mo, which ended in divorce in 2002.

Having previously lived in the Hampshire village of Crondall and with a holiday home in Devon, he moved to Les Fabres near Vals-les-Bains in France's Ardèche region in 2002 (as seen on A Place in France) and later started an 18 month relationship with his mortgage broker; Celine Cavaillez. This later broke down and he started a relationship with Sally-Ann Fitt, who, despite some televised skirmishes during Nigel's Place in France, was to remain his partner until his death.

Farrell was diagnosed with pancreatic cancer in early 2010. By November of the same year he was in remission but he died in September 2011 after the cancer returned.
