= James C. Allen (engraver) =

James Charles Allen (3 November 1790 – 1833) was an English line-engraver from London.

He was the son of William Allen, a Smithfield salesman, and his wife, Elizabeth.

Allen was taught by William Bernard Cooke, and in conjunction with whom he engraved and published in 1821 Views of the Colosseum, from drawings by Major-General Cockburn, and in 1825 Views in the South of France, chiefly on the Rhone, from drawings by Peter De Wint, after original sketches by John Hughes. He likewise engraved a spirited plate of the Defeat of the Spanish Armada, after P. J. de Loutherbourg, for the Gallery of Greenwich Hospital; St. Mawes, Cornwall, after Turner, for Cooke's Picturesque Views on the Southern Coast of England; Portsmouth from Spithead, after Stanfield; and The Temple of Isis, after Cockburn. He excelled especially in etching, and was much employed on illustrations for books.

His work remains in the British Museum.
