= James Allen (cricketer) =

English cricketer

Personal information
- Full name: James Stephen Allen
- Born: 4 November 1881; Croydon, Surrey, England
- Died: 4 April 1958 (aged 76); Creaton, Northamptonshire, England
- Batting: Left-handed
- Bowling: Slow left-arm orthodox

Domestic team information
- Years: Team
- 1905: Northamptonshire

Career statistics
Competition	First-class
Matches	2
Runs scored	0
Batting average	0.00
100s/50s	0/0
Top score	0*
Balls bowled	210
Wickets	1
Bowling average	154.00
5 wickets in innings	0
10 wickets in match	0
Best bowling	1/58
Catches/stumpings	0/–
- Source: CricketArchive, 5 August 2008

James Stephen Allen (4 November 1881 – 4 April 1958) was an English first-class cricketer who played for Northamptonshire in 1905 as a left-handed tail-end batsman and a slow left-arm spin bowler. He played in two matches, one of which was the first game played by Northamptonshire in the County Championship.
