= Jim Allen (footballer) =

Australian rules footballer

Personal information
- Full name: Albert James Allen
- Born: 25 November 1912; Kaniva, Victoria
- Died: 21 January 1972 (aged 59); Geelong, Victoria
- Original team: Kaniva
- Height: 181 cm (5 ft 11 in)
- Weight: 80 kg (176 lb)

Playing career^{1}
| Years | Club | Games (Goals) |
| 1935 | Geelong | 1 (0) |
- ^{1} Playing statistics correct to the end of 1935.

Albert James Allen (25 November 1912 – 21 January 1972) was an Australian rules footballer who played with Geelong in the Victorian Football League (VFL).
