= James Allan =

James Allan may refer to:

== Sports ==
- James Allan (Australian footballer) (born 1985), Australian rules footballer
- James Allan (cricketer) (born 1972), New Zealand cricketer
- James Allan (footballer, born 1857) (1857–1911), Scottish schoolmaster and footballer, founder of Sunderland A.F.C.
- James Allan (footballer, born 1866) (1866–1945), Scottish international footballer (also known as John Allan)
- James Allan (rugby union) (1860–1934), New Zealand rugby union player
- Jock Allan (c. 1891–?), Scottish footballer

== Music ==
- James Allan (musician) (born 1979), lead singer and guitarist and former footballer
- James Allan, a member of the band E-Rotic

== Others ==
- James Alexander Allan (1879–1967), Australian poet
- James Allan (diplomat) (1932–2018), British diplomat
- James Allan (Canadian politician) (1894–1992), Ontario politician
- James Allan (bishop) (1928–2013), retired Canadian Anglican bishop
- James Allan (computer scientist), University of Massachusetts Amherst professor
- James Allan (law professor) (born 1960), Canadian-Australian law professor
- James Allan (Queensland politician) (1856–1938), Queensland draper and state politician
- James Allan Jr. (1845–1932), Wisconsin politician
- James McGrigor Allan (1827–1916), British anthropologist and writer

== See also ==
- James Allen (disambiguation)
- Jim Allan (disambiguation)
- Jimmy Allan (disambiguation)
