= Bulkington, Wiltshire =

Village and civil parish in the county of Wiltshire, England

Coordinates: 51.324°N 2.083°W

Bulkington
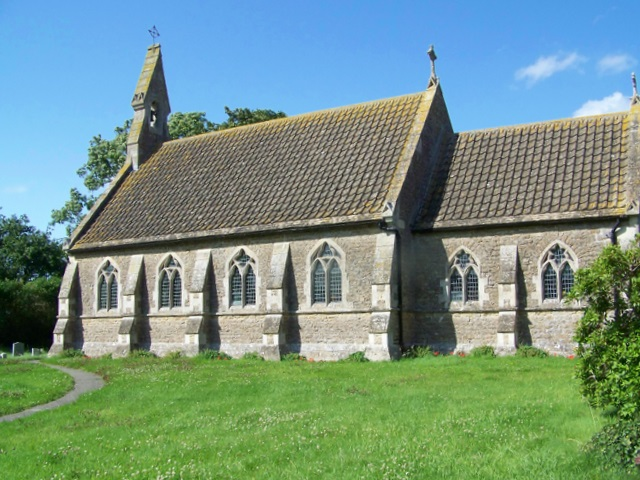
- Christ Church

- Location within Wiltshire
- Population: 285 (2011 census)
- OS grid reference: ST943583
- Civil parish: Bulkington
- Unitary authority: Wiltshire
- Ceremonial county: Wiltshire
- Region: South West
- Country: England
- Sovereign state: United Kingdom
- Post town: Devizes
- Postcode district: SN10
- Dialling code: 01380
- Police: Wiltshire
- Fire: Dorset and Wiltshire
- Ambulance: South Western
- UK Parliament: Melksham and Devizes
- Website: Parish Council

Bulkington is a village and civil parish in the county of Wiltshire, England. The village is about 4.5 miles (7.2 km) west of Devizes and a similar distance southeast of Melksham.

The northern boundary of the parish is the Summerham Brook, and the Semington Brook is the boundary to the west and south.

Bulkington was one of the villages featured in the 2003 BBC2 television documentary A Country Parish.

== History ==
This brief history of Bulkington has been taken mainly from editions of the Wiltshire Archaeological and Natural History Magazine.

Excavations at Lawn Farm in 1994 have uncovered evidence of periodic occupation from the 12th century onwards, with a first mention in historical records in 1217 (77 1997). There is also physical evidence of pre-medieval human activity represented by a tiny assemblage of worked flint, possibly Mesolithic or Neolithic in date and a shard of Roman pot (90 1997).

Aligned ENE-WSW and flanked by two brooks, Bulkington brook to the east and Semington Brook to the west, the village was initially formed within the manor of Edington. Edington Church contains a monument/tomb in the south transept, ascribed to Thomas Bulkington – rebus Boc-in-tun, the Boc signifying a beech tree (xlvii 1939). The addition of the –ton has also been attributed to an organised community that probably occupied pastured land after Domesday Book was published in 1086, whose records suggest that the area where Bulkington lies was woodland (xlviii 1939).

It is feasible that Thomas Bulkington may have been the donor of the original manor circa 1244 (90 1997) situated opposite the present-day church (linked with Manor Farm and the fieldworks behind it), and tithes of Bulkington before he joined the convent. His presence in the area is consolidated as a witness to the transfer of Keevil church to Edington Priory in 1393 (xlvii 1937; xx 1982; xxxii 1902).

The Lambeth Parliamentary Surveys of 1649 state that Bulkington was part of Keevil parish, paying tithes to Holy Trinity of Winchester. The monastery had a manor, a farm, customary rents and a rectorial tithe (xx 1982). Throughout time, Bulkington has had links with local gentry such as the Fitzlans, Earls of Arundel, the Stourton family, Richard Vere, the Earl of Oxford and Thomas Barkesdale (xx 1882).

There may have been a pre-reformation church in the New Leys field (possibly near Seend), which is said to have donated a bell to Steeple Ashton when it was pulled down (xxxix 1917). It is possible that there was another unofficial church, possibly a temporary structure in Bulkington, that may explain the notion of the other church (xxxii). However, the historical records suggest that there was no church until 1860 when Chamberline made Bulkington a separate parish, later becoming a civil parish in the 1880s (90 1997), and erected the present day structure in an enclosure formerly known as Damers Close dating back to 1769 (90 1997).

The Cross monument, opposite the public house, originally consisted just of the present steps later used as the base for the cross. The cross, the remains of which were found in the garden of an adjacent bungalow, was erected in 1920 as the parish war memorial. Its origins are unknown, although a report presented in 1903 describes a monument cross in Bulkington churchyard (xxxiii 1904). The Cross was formerly a meet for the trading of sheep.

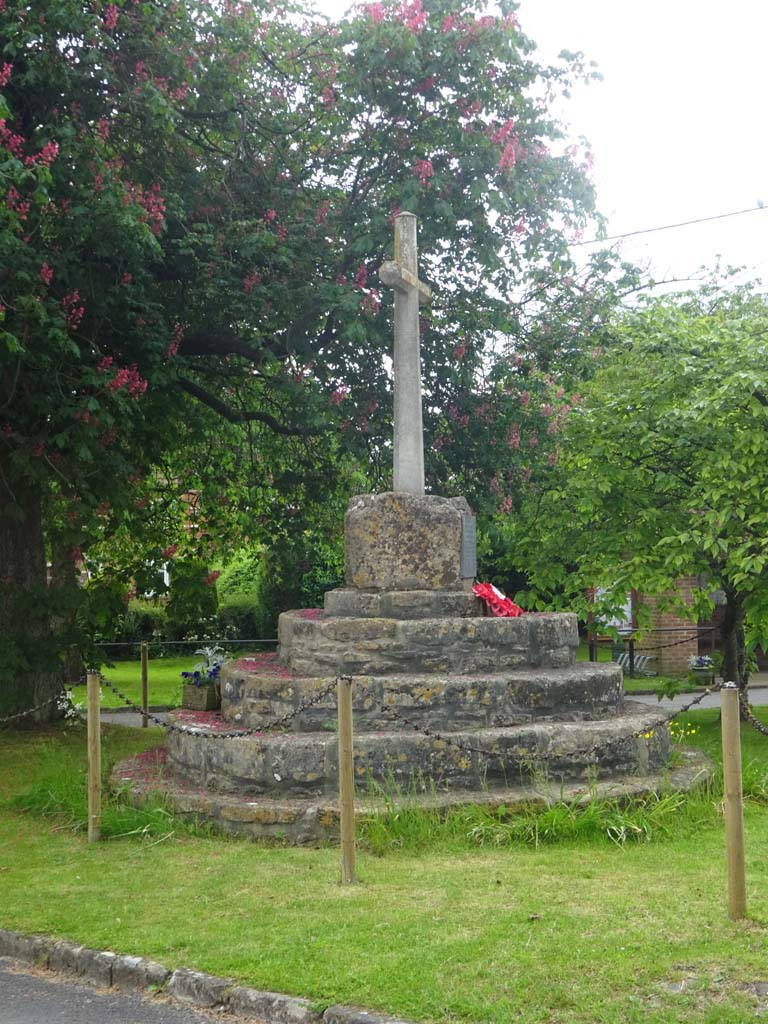
Central Cross and War Memorial, Bulkington

There is evidence of cloth factories at Bulkington (64 1969) at Mill House, at the bottom of Mill Lane, previously known as Bulkington or Gayford Mill. This was a fulling mill where woollens were finished and cleansed through scouring and beating circa 1486; there were clothiers in 1524 and with the intervention of the Industrial Revolution, a tucking mill and gig mill in 1730 (64 1969). The closure of the mill can be linked to evidence in 1831 of a cloth "factory" closing in the parish (64 1969). Evidence of an occupying workforce comes from the study of historical maps by AC Archaeology. These indicated two possible house platforms, with other earthworks including a pond, adjacent to a holloway connecting them to Brass Pan Bridge (near the present-day playing field) pre-dating 1773 (88 1995).

Excavations have uncovered post-Roman pottery from a number of sources including Crockerton near Warminster; Savernake Forest, Marlborough; Laverstock and Verwood near Salisbury, and Bath (90 1997); thus indicating other movements and occupation in and around Bulkington. There are several green lanes, now used as bridle paths, that run close to the village including The Drove that extends to Marston, Worton and Erlestoke. The lane that leads to the Drove, across Brass Pan Bridge, continued to the former hamlet known as Folly Green. There are also tracks towards Keevil and the surrounding area (xxxiii 1904). With a possible pottery production centre at Potterne and the proximity to the River Avon at Melksham, joined by the aforementioned brooks, Bulkington was in no means isolated. This is exemplified by several examples of folklore from the village, including links with the giant said to have lived at the Barge Inn, Seend Cleeve, and "Turpin's Stone" which lies by Pentry Bridge, depicting an inscription said to have run:

Dick Turpin's dead and gone,
This stone's put here to think upon." (xxxix 1917)

Bulkington was a tithing of the ancient parish of Keevil until 1866, when it was made a separate civil parish.

During the 19th century a dairy centre was the main industry in the village, on a site south of the main street where The Close now lies. In the 1960s the site was sold by the London Dairy Cooperative to Campbell-Gray, a plant hire company.

== Religious sites ==
A small Wesleyan Methodist chapel was built at the east end of the village in 1816. It closed in 1966 and the building became the village hall.

Christ Church, the Anglican church at the west end of the village, was built in 1860 to designs of T. Cundy. Before this church was built, worshippers attended Keevil or Poulshot. The new church was a chapel of ease to the church at Keevil until 1971, when the parish was united with Seend, and since 1995 it has been part of the united benefice of Seend, Bulkington and Poulshot.

== Amenities ==
There is a village hall and a pub, The Well (named the Tipsy Toad until 2009).

The parish has never had a formal school, beyond cottage schools in the 19th century. The nearest primary schools are at Keevil and Seend.
