= James Allen (priest, born 1805) =

Irish Anglican priest

James Hastings Allen (1805 - 1880) was an Anglican priest in Ireland in the nineteenth century.

Allen was born in County Clare and educated at Trinity College, Dublin. He was Dean of Killaloe from 1862 until his death.
