= A Country Parish =

British television documentary

A Country Parish is a British television documentary made by Tiger Aspect Productions for BBC Two which was first broadcast in 2003. Produced and directed by Nigel Farrell, the programme concerns the life of Jamie Allen, who at the beginning of the series is a young, proactive curate from a working-class background in the none-too-prosperous Midlands town of Nuneaton.

To his surprise, he is made rector of a wealthy, long-standing and beautiful parish in the heart of rural Wiltshire. He is not what was expected by the parishioners, and the series follows the new rector as he tries to win them over. His responsibility included the parishes of Seend, Bulkington and Poulshot, bordering Salisbury Plain.
