= James Vincent Allen =

Canadian philosopher (born 1959)

James Allen
- Born: 1959 (age 66–67)

Education
- Education: Yale University (BA); Princeton University (PhD)

Philosophical work
- Era: 21st-century philosophy
- Region: Western philosophy
- Institutions: University of Toronto
- Main interests: ancient philosophy

James Allen (born 1959) is a Canadian philosopher and Professor of Philosophy at the University of Toronto Mississauga. He is known for his works on ancient philosophy.

== Books ==
- Inference from Signs: Ancient Debates about the Nature of Evidence, Oxford University Press, 2001, 2008
