= Danica Taylor =

English television personality (born 1997)

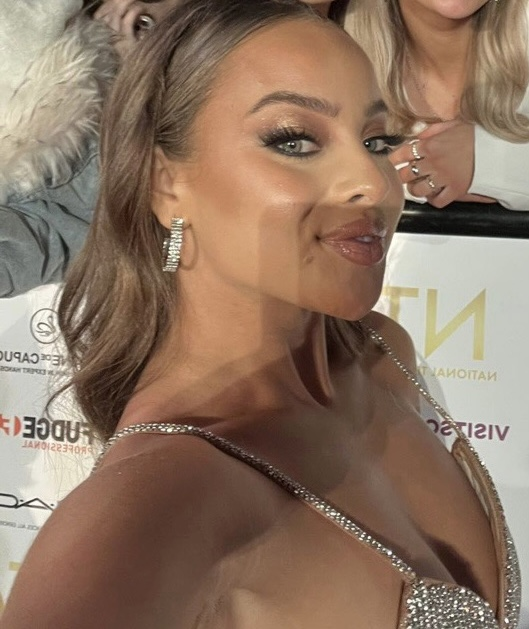
- Taylor in 2022
- Born: 13 April 2001 (age 25); Leicester, East Midlands, England
- Occupation: Television personality
- Television: Love Island

Danica Taylor (born 13 April 2001) is an English television personality. After working as a dancer, she rose to prominence when she was cast on the eighth series of the ITV2 dating series Love Island. Since her exit, she has performed on Britain Get Singing. She is married as of July 2025.

== Life and career ==
Taylor was born on 13 April 2001 in Leicester, East Midlands. She is of English and Jamaican heritage. She trained in dance at university and obtained a degree. She began performing professionally, with her gigs including being a backup dancer for Jax Jones at the 2021 Jingle Bell Ball.

In 2022, Taylor was cast as a "bombshell" on the eighth series of the ITV2 dating series Love Island. She was flown out to Mallorca and was told on the twelfth day of the series that she would be entering the villa. She was given one hour to prepare for her entrance. Throughout the series, Taylor struggled to form romantic connections but she soon became a fan-favourite due to her personality and sense of humour. Taylor's exit from the series in the final week went viral after she danced out of the villa. Months after her exit, Taylor performed on ITV's Britain Get Singing special as part of a mental health campaign led by the network.

== Filmography ==
As herself
Year	Title	Notes	Ref.
2022	Love Island	Contestant; Series 8	
2022	Britain Get Singing	Performer	
