= Allen (surname) =

Origin
- Origin: Insular Celtic
- Meaning: "little rock", "harmony", "great" and "handsome"
- Region of origin: Scotland, England

Other names
- Variant forms: Alan, Allan, MacAllen

Allen is a British surname, originating from England, Scotland, Wales and Ireland. It is a variation of the surname MacAllen and may be derived from two separate sources: Ailin, in Irish and Scottish Gaelic, means both "little rock" and "harmony", or it may also be derived from the Celtic Aluinn, which means "handsome". Variant spellings include Alan, Allan, etc.

In Portugal, George Allen, an early 18th century trader from England, settled in Porto; he is the first of the Portuguese Allen family – deeply involved in port wine and dating back to 1701 in Portugal – that still owns the noble mansion Quinta de Villar d'Allen, their country estate for more than 180 years (1839). George Allen was a descendant of Henry Allen, Lord of the Manor of Buckenhall in Staffordshire in 1290, and probably of one Alanus de Buckenhall, from whom all the Allens of Staffordshire were said to have descended.

In Ireland, Allen is the Anglicization of the Gaelic name Ó h-Ailín. Allen is the 41st most common surname in England.

== Pages listing several people with the same name ==
- Albert Allen
- Alexander Allen
- Alfred Allen
- Andrew Allen
- Anita Allen
- Anthony Allen
- Arthur Allen
- Benjamin Allen
- Bernard Allen
- Bert Allen
- Bill Allen
- Brian Allen
- Bruce Allen
- Bryan Allen
- C. J. Allen
- Charles Allen
- Charlie Allen
- Chris Allen
- Christopher Allen
- Clarence Allen
- Cory Allen
- Craig Allen
- Damon Allen
- Dan Allen
- David Allen
- Denis Allen
- Dennis Allen
- Doug Allen
- Eddie Allen
- Edward Allen
- Elizabeth Allen
- Ernest Allen
- Ethan Allen
- Frances Allen
- Francis Allen
- Frank Allen
- Fred Allen
- George Allen
- Gordon Allen
- Graham Allen
- Greg Allen
- Harry Allen
- Harvey Allen
- Henry Allen
- Ian Allen
- Jack Allen
- James Allen
- Jason Allen
- Jerome Allen
- John Allen
- Joseph Allen
- Josh Allen
- Jules Allen
- Kate Allen
- Keith Allen
- Kenneth Allen
- Kevin Allen
- Laurie Allen
- Leslie Allen
- Malcolm Allen
- Marcus Allen
- Martin Allen
- Michael Allen
- Nancy Allen
- Nicholas Allen
- Oliver Allen
- Patrick Allen
- Paul Allen
- Percy Allen
- Peter Allen
- Philip Allen
- Ralph Allen
- Randy Allen
- Ray Allen
- Raymond Allen
- Rebecca Allen
- Reginald Allen
- Richard Allen
- Robert Allen
- Roderick Allen
- Rodney Allen
- Roger Allen
- Ronald Allen
- Russell Allen
- Ruth Allen
- Samuel Allen
- Sandra Allen
- Sarah Allen
- Stephen Allen
- Steve Allen
- Terry Allen
- Thomas Allen
- Tommy Allen
- Tony Allen
- Will Allen
- William Allen
- Willie Allen

== A ==
- A. A. Allen (1911–1970), American Pentecostal evangelist
- Abner P. Allen (1839–1905), American Medal of Honor recipient
- A. J. Allen (born 1998), Canadian football player
- Alexander Viets Griswold Allen (1841–1908), American Episcopal theologian
- Alf Allen (1912–1987), New Zealand politician
- Amari Allen (born 2006), American basketball player
- Angela Allen, English paedophile convicted in the 2009 Plymouth child abuse case
- Anson Allen (1838–1880), American politician
- Anthony Adrian Allen (1913–2010), British entomologist
- Arnold Allen (born 1994), English mixed martial arts fighter
- Arnold Allen (mathematician), American computer scientist
- Arthur Augustus Allen (1885–1964), American ornithologist
- Ashley Allen, American comic book writer
- Austin Allen (baseball) (born 1994), American baseball player

== B ==
- Barry Allen (musician) (1945–2020), Canadian rock musician and record producer
- Bernadette Allen (born 1956), U.S. diplomat
- Bert Allen (footballer, born 1883) (1883–1911), English footballer
- Beverly Allen (born 1945), Australian botanical artist
- Bianca Allen, American voice actress
- Bobby Allen (racing driver) (born 1943), American racing driver
- Bobby Allen (ice hockey) (born 1978), American ice hockey player
- Bradley Allen (born 1971), English footballer
- Braelon Allen (born 2004), American football player
- Brenda A. Allen, American psychologist and president of Lincoln University (Pennsylvania)
- Brevin Allen (born 2000), American football player
- Brittany Allen (born 1986), Canadian actress
- Bryn Allen (1921–2005), Welsh international footballer
- Bryon Allen (born 1992), American basketball player in Israeli Basketball Premier League

== C ==
- Caitilyn Allen (born 1957), American plant pathologist
- Cam Allen (born 1999), American football player
- Carl Meredith Allen (accused) (1925–1994), American source of the "Philadelphia Experiment" story
- Carolyn Blanchard Allen (1921–2018), American politician
- Carson Allen, American musician, founding member of Escape The Fate
- Cecil J. Allen (1886–1973), British railway engineer and writer
- Chaisson Allen (born 1989), American basketball player and coach
- Cheryl Allen (sprinter) (born 1972), retired Canadian sprinter
- Clarence Ray Allen (1930–2006), American convicted murderer
- Claude Henry Allen (1899–1974), American lawyer and politician
- Clive Allen (born 1961), retired English footballer
- Clive Allen (basketball) (born 1961), retired English basketball player and coach
- Cody Allen (born 1988), American baseball player
- Collins B. Allen (1866–1953), President of the New Jersey Senate
- Conor Allen (born 1990), American ice hockey player
- Corey Allen (1934–2010), American film and television director, producer, writer and actor
- Cyrus Allen (born 2003), American football player

== D ==
- Daevid Allen (1938–2015 as Christopher David Allen), Australian musician, founder of Soft Machine and Gong
- Dakarai Allen (born 1995), American professional basketball player
- Dakota Allen (born 1995), American football player
- Damon Allen (born 1963), Veteran American Canadian Football League quarterback
- Damon Allen (figure skater), American figure skater
- Daphne Allen (1899–1985), English artist
- Darina Allen (born 1951), Irish chef
- Dave Allen (comedian) (1936–2005), Irish comedian
- Davis Allen (American football) (born 2001), American football player
- Dayton Allen (1919–2004), American comedian and voice actor
- Debbie Allen (born 1950), American actress and television director-producer
- Deborah Allen (born 1953), American country music singer
- Dede Allen (1923–2010), American film editor
- Devere Allen (1891–1955), American pacifist political activist and writer
- Dick Allen (1942–2020), Major League Baseball first baseman and third baseman
- Dick Allen (film editor) (1944–2007), English film editor
- Diogenes Allen (1932–2013), American philosopher and theologian
- Dolly Allen (1906–1990), English comedian, singer and performer
- Dominic Allen (born 1980), Australian film director and producer
- Dominique Allen (born 1989), British basketball player
- Donna Allen (singer), American dance pop singer
- Dwayne Allen (born 1990), American football player

== E ==
- Ed Allen (musician) (1897–1974), American jazz trumpeter
- Edgar Van Nuys Allen (1900–1961), American physician
- Edmund T. Allen (1896–1943), American test pilot
- Eliza Crosby Allen (1803–1848), American journal editor
- Elizabeth Anne Allen (born 1970), American actress
- Elsa Guerdrum Allen (1888–1969), American ornithologist and historian of ornithology
- Eric Allen (born 1965), American football player
- Ernie Allen (born 1946), American attorney
- Esther Saville Allen (1837–1913; pen name, "Winnie Woodbine"), American author
- Ethan Allen (baseball) (1904–1993), American baseball player
- Ethel D. Allen (1929–1981), Pennsylvania politician

== F ==
- Fabian Allen (born 1995), Jamaican cricketer
- Faimealelei Anthony Fuʻe Allen, American Samoan politician
- Fanny Allen (1784–1819), American nun and nurse
- Fay Allen (1939–2021), British-Jamaican police officer, the first black woman police constable in the United Kingdom
- Fay Allen (teacher), American teacher
- Finnley Allen, New Zealand cricketer
- Fiona Allen (born 1965), English actress
- Floyd Allen (1856–1913), American landowner, later convicted of murder
- Frances E. Allen (1932–2020), US computer scientist, recipient of the Turing Award
- Francesca Allen (born 2002), British adaptive rower
- Frederick Lewis Allen (1890–1954), American historian and editor

== G ==
- Gabrielle Allen, British and American astrophysicist
- Gary Allen (1936–1986), American journalist
- Gavin Allen (born 1965), Australian rugby league footballer
- Gareth Allen (born 1988), Welsh professional snooker player
- Genevera Allen, American statistician
- Geoffrey Freeman Allen (1922–1995), English author specialising in the field of railways
- Georgia Allen (1919–2014), American actress
- Geri Allen (1957–2017), American jazz pianist and composer
- Glenn Allen Jr. (born 1970), American racing driver and team owner
- Glover Morrill Allen (1879–1942), mammalogist
- Gracie Allen (1895–1964), American comedian
- Grant Allen (1848–1899), Canadian science writer
- Gubby Allen, aka G. O. Allen (1902–1989), English cricketer

== H ==
- Hank Allen (1940–2024), Major League baseball outfielder
- Hannah Allen (1638–?), British writer
- Harrison Allen (1841–1897), American physician and zoologist
- Harvey A. Allen (c. 1818 – 1882), United States Army officer, was Commander of the Department of Alaska 1871–1873
- Harry Julian Allen (1910–1977), NASA engineer and administrator
- Heck Allen (1912 –1991), American author and screenwriter
- Heidi Allen (born 1975), British politician
- Henry C. Allen (Virginia politician) (1838–1889), politician and lawyer from Virginia
- Holless Wilbur Allen (1880–1966), inventor of the compound bow
- Howard Allen (1949–2020), American serial killer

== I ==
- Iona Allen (1937–2003), American seamstress, working for multiple NASA space missions
- Isabelle Allen (born 2002), English actress
- Ira Allen (1751–1814), politician from Vermont
- Irwin Allen (1916–1991), American film and television producer

== J ==
- Jackie Allen (musician) (born 1959), American jazz vocalist and composer
- Jacob Allen, American politician
- Jake Allen (ice hockey) (born 1990), Canadian ice hockey player
- James Allen (journalist) (born 1966), British motor racing journalist
- James Allen (racing driver) (born 1996), Australian racing driver
- James Van Allen (1914–2006), American scientist, known for the Van Allen radiation belt
- Jan Allen (born 1952), Canadian curator
- Jared Allen (born 1982), American football player
- Jay Allen (1900–1972), American journalist
- Jeff Allen (musician) (born 1946), English rock and blues session drummer
- Jennifer Allen (born 1961), American author
- Jimmy Allen (American football) (1952–2019), American football player
- Jimmy Allen (musician), member of American rock band Against All Will
- Joan Allen (born 1956), American actress
- Joe Allen (born 1990), Welsh footballer
- Joel Asaph Allen (1838–1921), American zoologist
- John J. Allen (judge) (1797–1871), politician and judge from Virginia
- Johnny Allen (racing driver) (born 1934), American racing driver
- Jonathan Allen (artist) (born 1966), British visual artist, writer, and magician
- Jonathan Allen (born 1995), American football player
- Jordan Allen (born 1995), American professional soccer player
- Joseph Henry Allen (1820–1898), Unitarian clergyman, editor and scholar

== K ==
- Kadeem Allen (born 1993), American basketball player
- Karen Allen (born 1951), American actress
- Karl Allen (1931–2015), American neo-Nazi
- Kathleen Allen (1906–1983), British artist
- Katie Allen (politician) (1966–2025), Australian medical researcher and politician
- Katie Allen (field hockey) (born 1974), Australian Olympic field hockey player
- Kaytron Allen (born 2003), American football player
- Kazmeir Allen (born 2000), American football player
- Keegan Allen (born 1989), American actor, photographer, author and musician
- Keenan Allen (born 1992), American football player
- Kenny Allen (racing driver) (born 1956), American racing driver
- Kenton Allen (born 1965), British television producer
- Kevin Scott Allen (born 1957), American actor
- Kiera Allen (born 1997), American actress
- Kimball Allen (born 1982), American actor and writer
- Kirsten Bloom Allen, American ballet dancer and actress
- Kris Allen (born 1985), American musician, singer and songwriter
- Krista Allen (born 1971), American actress and model
- Kristin Allen (born 1992), American acrobatic gymnast
- Kyle Allen (born 1996), American football player

== L ==
- Larry Allen (born 1971), American footballer
- Laura Allen (born 1974), American actress
- Laurence W. Allen (1892–1968), English World War I flying ace
- Lavilla Esther Allen (1834–1903), American writer
- Lavoy Allen (born 1989), American basketball player
- Lawrence Allen Jr. (born 1959), American politician and educator
- Lee Allen (musician) (1927–1994), American tenor saxophonist
- Leo Allen (born 1972), American stand-up comedian
- Leo E. Allen (1898–1973), American politician
- LeQuint Allen (born 2004), American football player
- Les Allen (born 1937), English footballer
- Leslie Allen (racing driver) (1892–1946), American racing driver
- Lester Allen (1891–1949), American screen, stage and vaudeville actor and film director
- Lettie Annie Allen (1901–1980), New Zealand public servant, political activist, feminist and local politician
- Lew Allen (1925–2010), U.S. Air Force general
- Lewis F. Allen (1800–1890), farmer and politician
- Lexi Allen (born 1967), American gospel singer, actress and television personality
- Lillian B. Allen (1904–1995), Canadian painter and photographer
- Lillian Allen (born 1951), Canadian dub poet, musician, and writer
- Lily Allen (born 1985), English singer-songwriter
- Lisa Allen (born 1981), British chef
- Logan Allen (baseball, born 1997) (born 1997), American baseball player
- Logan Allen (baseball, born 1998) (born 1998), American baseball player
- Lou Allen (1924–2008), American footballer
- Louisa Rose Allen (born 1989), English singer and model known as Foxes
- Loy Allen Jr. (born 1966), American racing driver
- Lucius Allen (born 1947), American basketball player
- Luke Allen (born 1978), American baseball player
- Lynn Allen (1891–1958), NFL player

== M ==
- Mac Allen (born 1985), Canadian lacrosse player
- Malik Allen (born 1978), American basketball player
- Mark Allen (triathlete) (born 1958), American triathlete
- Mark Allen (snooker player) (born 1986), Northern Irish snooker player
- Martin Allen (born 1964), British missing person
- Marty Allen (1922–2018), American comedian, actor, and philanthropist
- Mary Allen (born 1951), British writer
- Maryon Pittman Allen (1925–2018), American politician
- Matt Allen (born 1977), American football player
- Mel Allen (1913–1996), American sportscaster
- Michael Allen (air navigator) (1923–2001), British air navigator and radar operator of the Royal Air Force
- Michael Allen (rugby union) (born 1990), Rugby union Player
- Michael Graham Allen (born 1950), player and maker of Native American flutes
- Mike Allen (poet) (born 1969), American writer and poet
- Milton Allen (1888–1981), Governor of Saint Christopher-Nevis-Anguilla
- Myron Allen (1854–1924), American baseball player
- Myrtle Allen (1924–2018), Irish chef

== N ==
- Nathaniel Allen (1780–1832), American politician
- Nathaniel M. Allen (1840–1900), American soldier
- Neil Allen (born 1958), American Major League baseball player
- Nellie B. Allen (1874–1961), American landscape designer
- Newton D. R. Allen (died 1927), American politician
- Nick Allen (catcher) (1888–1939), American Major League baseball player
- Nicky Allen (1958–1984), New Zealand rugby union player
- Noah Allen (born 2004), Association football player
- Norman M. Allen (1828–1909), New York politician
- Norman Percy Allen (1903–1972), British metallurgist

== O ==
- Omari Allen (born 1990), Montserratian cricketer
- Orlando Allen (1803–1874), American politician—Buffalo, New York
- Oscar Dana Allen (1836–1913), chemistry professor at Yale; bryophyte collector
- Oscar K. Allen (1882–1936), Democratic governor of Louisiana (1932–36)

== P ==
- Paul Allen (1953–2018), co-founder of Microsoft, philanthropist
- Pauline Allen (born 1948), Australian scholar of early Christianity
- Percival Allen (1917–2008), British geologist
- Percy Allen (politician) (1913–1992), New Zealand politician
- Percy Stafford Allen (1869–1933), British classical scholar
- Pete Allen (musician) (born 1954), English dixieland jazz clarinetist
- Peter Allen (footballer) (1946–2023), English footballer
- Peter Allen (musician) (1944–1992), Australian songwriter and singer
- Peter Allen (US broadcaster) (1920–2016), American broadcaster and radio announcer
- Peter Anthony Allen (1911–1964), British convicted murderer
- Peter Lewis Allen (born 1957), American scholar and author
- Philip Allen (Rhode Island politician) (1785–1865), American politician
- Philip Allen, Baron Allen of Abbeydale (1912–2007), British civil servant
- Philip Schuyler Allen (1871–1973), American scholar of German literature
- Pierre Allen (born 1987), American football player
- Phog Allen (1885–1974), American athlete, coach, and physician

== Q ==
- Queenie Allen (1911–2007), English badminton player
- Quincy Allen (born 1979), American serial killer

== R ==
- Rachel Allen (born 1972), Irish chef
- PnB Rock born Rakim Allen (1991–2022), American rapper and singer professionally known as PnB Rock
- Ralph Shuttleworth Allen (1817–1887), British Conservative Member of Parliament
- The Rance Allen Group#Rance Allen (1948–2020), American Bishop, Minister, and gospel musician
- RaShaun Allen (born 1990), American football player
- Ray Allen (born 1975), American basketball player
- Rebecca Allen (basketball) (born 1992), Australian basketball player
- Red Allen (1908–1967), American jazz trumpeter
- Red Allen (bluegrass) (1930–1993), American bluegrass singer and guitarist
- Rex Allen (1920–1999), American actor, singer, songwriter
- Ricca Allen (1863–1949), Canadian stage and film actress
- Richard Knapp Allen (1925–1992), American entomologist and marine zoologist
- Rick Allen (drummer) (born 1963), English rock drummer
- Rick Allen (mountaineer) (1954–2021), Scottish climber
- Ricky Allen (1935–2005), American blues singer
- River Allen (footballer) (born 1995), English footballer
- Rod Allen (advertising executive) (1929–2007), British advertising executive
- Rod Allen (born 1959), American television baseball commentator
- Rosalie Allen (1924–2003), American country singer, songwriter, guitarist, columnist and television and radio host
- Rosalind Allen (born 1957), New Zealand-born American actress
- Rose Allen, one of the Colchester Martyrs
- Ruth Allen (economist) (1889–1979), American economist and academic
- Ryan Allen (bass) (1943–2018), American opera singer
- Ryan Allen (American football) (born 1990), American football player in the National Football League
- R. G. D. Allen (Roy George Douglas Allen) (1906–1983), English economist and mathematician

== S ==
- Sadie Allen (1930–2017), British artist
- Sarah Addison Allen, American author
- Shaun Allen (born 1965), English professional rugby union player
- Sheila Matthews Allen (1929–2013), American actress
- Sheila Allen (English actress) (1932–2011), English actress
- Shirley Allen, American nurse involved in 1997 "siege"
- Sian Barbara Allen (1946–2025), American actress
- Simon Allen (born 1983), New Zealand cricketer
- Sonny Allen (1938–2020), American college basketball coach
- Steve Allen (1921–2000), American actor, comedian, composer, writer

== T ==
- Taylor Allen (born 2000), English footballer
- Tim Allen (born 1953), American actor
- Timothy Allen (born 1971), English photographer
- Timothy F. H. Allen (born 1942), British botanist
- Tina Allen (1949–2008), American sculptor
- Tom Allen (broadcaster) (born 1964), Canadian radio host
- Tom Allen (painter) (born 1975), American painter
- Toussaint Allen (1896–1960), American baseball player in the Negro leagues
- Travis Allen (born 1973), American politician
- Trevon Allen (born 1998), American basketball player
- Tyler Allen (motorsport) (born 1987), American race engineer

== V ==
- Vic Allen (1923–2014), British Communist; trade unionist; university academic
- Victor M. Allen (1870–1916), New York politician
- Vince Allen (born 1955), American-Canadian football player
- Viola Allen (1887–1948), American silent film and theater actress
- Viv Allen (1916–1995), Canadian ice hockey player
- Vivian Ayers Allen (1923–2025), American poet, playwright, cultural activist, museum curator and classicist

== W ==
- W. Gordon Allen, American politician
- Walter Allen (1911–1995), English literary critic
- Ray Allen born Walter Allen (born 1975), American basketball player
- Willard H. Allen (1893–1957), American state secretary of agriculture
- William Allen (Armagh MP) (1866–1947), Northern Irish unionist politician
- William Ross Allen (1869–1942), American politician and lawyer from Virginia
- Willie Allen (racing driver) (born 1980), American racing driver
- Winifred Allen (1896–1943), American actress
- Woodrow M. Allen (born 1943), American politician from Maryland
- Woody Allen (born 1935), American film actor and director, although not his birth name

== Z ==
- Zach Allen (born 1997), American football player

== Fictional characters ==
- Barry Allen, identity of the DC Comics hero, The Flash

== Unknown ==
- Allen (Cambridge University cricketer), active 1820s

== See also ==
- Allen (given name)
  - Allan (given name)
  - Alan (given name)
- Alan (surname)
- Allan (surname)
- Allenby (disambiguation)
- Van Allen (disambiguation), a surname
- Sture Allén (born 1928), Swedish academic
- Ellen Allien, a German electronic musician, music producer, and founder of BPitch Control music label
