= Stephen Allen =

Stephen Allen may refer to:

- Stephen Allen (American politician) (1767–1852), American politician from New York
- Stephen B. Allen (born 1950), Latter-day Saint filmmaker
- Stephen Haley Allen (1847–1931), associate justice of the Kansas Supreme Court
- Stephen Allen (colonial administrator) (1882–1964), New Zealand farmer, politician and colonial administrator

== See also ==
- Steve Allen (disambiguation)
- Stephen Allan (born 1973), Australian golfer
- Steven Allan (born 1956), Australian footballer
- Allen (surname)
