= Ernest Allen =

Ernest Allen may refer to:

- Ernest John Bartlett Allen (1884–1945), British socialist
- Ernest Allen (American football) (born 1973), American football player
- Ernest Allen (cricketer) (1880–1943), English cricketer
- Pokey Allen (Ernest Allen, 1943–1996), football coach at Portland State and Boise State
- Ernest Allen (Australian politician) (1910–1984), Australian politician

== See also ==
- Ernie Allen (born 1946), attorney serving as the president & CEO of the National Center for Missing & Exploited Children
- Allen (surname)
