= Percy Allen =

Percy Allen may refer to:

- Percival Allen (1917–2008), British geologist
- Percy Allen (footballer) (1895–1969), English football player
- Percy Allen (writer) (1875–1959), drama critic and writer on Shakespeare
- Percy Allen (politician) (1913–1992), New Zealand politician
- Percy Stafford Allen (1869–1933), British classical scholar
- Percy Allen, player in the 1938 World Ice Hockey Championships
- Percy Allen (cricketer) (1908–1995), New Zealand cricket player

== See also ==
- Percy Allan (1861–1930), Australian civil engineer
- Allen (surname)
