= Kevin Allen =

Kevin Allen may refer to:

- Kevin Allen (author) (born 1954), American author and businessman
- Kevin Allen (director) (born 1959), Welsh-born English actor
- Kevin Allen (tackle) (born 1963), American football player
- Kevin Allen (guitarist), American guitar player with ...And You Will Know Us by the Trail of Dead
- Kevin Allen (reality TV), American candidate on The Apprentice
- Kevin Allen (defensive back) (born 1986), American football defensive back
- Kevin Bond Allen (born 1954), bishop in the Anglican Church in North America
- Kevin Allen (journalist), American sports journalist and author
- Kevin Scott Allen (born 1957), American actor
- Kevin Allen (footballer) (born 1961), English footballer, see List of AFC Bournemouth players (1–24 appearances)

== See also ==
- Allen (surname)
