= Katherine Allen =

Katherine Allen may refer to:

- Katherine Allen (Maine politician) (1874–1953), American politician from Maine
- Katherine Allen (Washington politician), American politician from Washington
- Kate Allen (triathlete) (born 1970), Australian-Austrian triathlete
- Kate Allen (Amnesty International) (born 1955), director of Amnesty International UK

== See also ==
- Kate Allen (disambiguation)
- Katherine Allen Lively, American writer and musician
