= Chris Allen =

Chris Allen may refer to:

- Chris Allen (academic) (born 1966), British sociologist
- Chris Allen (footballer, born 1972), English football player
- Chris Allen (footballer, born 1989), English football player
- Chris Allen (ice hockey) (born 1978), Canadian ice hockey defenceman
- Chris Allen (skier) (born 1959), Australian Olympic skier
- Chris W. Allen (born 1956), University of Nebraska in Omaha academic
- Chris Allen (author) (born 1964), Australian novelist
- Chris Allen (born 1952), vocalist with The Troggs
- Chris Allen, founding member of the band Shadowkeep

== See also ==
- Kris Allen (born 1985), 2009 American Idol winner
- Christopher Allen (disambiguation)
- Allen (surname)
