= Andrew Allen =

Andrew Allen may refer to:

- Andrew Allen (ice hockey) (born 1976), Canadian ice hockey goaltender coach
- Andrew Allen (Pennsylvania politician) (1740–1825), lawyer and official from the Province of Pennsylvania
- Andrew Allen (New Zealand politician) (1876–1963), New Zealand businessman and politician, mayor of Dunedin and member of the Legislative Council
- Andrew Hussey Allen (1855–1921), American archivist and author
- Andrew M. Allen (born 1955), American astronaut
- Andrew Allen (singer) (born 1981), Canadian singer
- Andrew Allen (priest) (died 1808), Irish Anglican priest
- Andrew J. Allen (born 1986), American saxophonist and pedagogue
- Andrew James Campbell Allen (1856–1923), Northern Irish mathematician and educational administrator
- Murder of Andrew Allen (1988–2012), Irish murder victim

Andy Allen may refer to:

- Andy Allen (chef) (born 1988), Australian television cook and winner of MasterChef Australia 2012
- Andy Allen (footballer) (born 1974), former English footballer
- Andy Allen (rugby union) (born 1967), former Welsh international rugby union player
- Andy Allen (politician) (born 1988), Ulster Unionist Party politician in Northern Ireland

== See also ==
- Andrew Allan (disambiguation)
- Allen (surname)
