= Fred Allen (disambiguation) =

Fred Allen (1894–1956) was an American comedian.

Fred Allen or Frederick Allen may also refer to:

== Arts and entertainment ==
- Frederick Warren Allen (1888–1961), American sculptor
- Fred Allen (film editor) (1896–1955), American film editor
- Fred Allen (set designer) (1942–2007), Canadian set designer and artist

== Politics and law ==
- Fred E. Allen (1855–1935), American merchant and member of the New York State Assembly
- Frederick Hobbes Allen (1858–1937), American lawyer and soldier
- Fred J. Allen (1865–1917), American politician and lawyer
- Frederick Allen (Maine politician) (1914–2001), American politician from Maine
- Frederic W. Allen (1926–2016), American jurist, chief justice of the Vermont Supreme Court
- Fred Allen (Arkansas politician) (fl. 2000s–2010s), American politician in the Arkansas House of Representatives

== Sports ==
- Frederick W. Allen (1844–1927), South Australian racehorse owner and breeder
- Fred Allen (footballer) (1860–c. 1926), English footballer
- Fred Allen (long jumper) (1890–1964), American track and field athlete
- Fred Allen (rugby union) (1920–2012), rugby player and coach from New Zealand
- Fred Allen (cricketer) (born 1935), English cricketer

== Others ==
- Fred Hovey Allen (1845–1926), American theologian
- Frederick Madison Allen (1879–1964), American doctor who treated diabetes
- Frederick Lewis Allen (1890–1954), American magazine editor and historian
- Frederic de Forest Allen (1844–1897), American classical scholar

== See also ==
- Allen (surname)
