= Francis Allen =

Francis Allen may refer to:

- Francis Allen (1518/19-66/76), Member of Parliament (MP) for Boston
- Francis Allen (regicide) (c. 1583–1658), English politician and a regicide of Charles I
- Francis Allen (Jesuit) (c. 1645–1712), Roman Catholic
- Francis Allen (engraver) (fl. 1652), German engraver
- Francis Allen (coach) (born 1948), former gymnastics coach
- Francis Allen (sport shooter) (born 1961), American sports shooter
- Francis R. Allen (1843–1931), architect of Boston, Massachusetts

== See also ==
- Frances Allen (disambiguation) for female version of the name
- Frank Allen (disambiguation)
