= Harvey Allen =

Harvey Allen may refer to:

- Harvey A. Allen (1818–1882), Alaskan politician in the 1870s
- Harvey Allen (coach) (1888–1957), American football player and coach and college president
- Harry Julian Allen (1910–1977), also known as Harvey Allen, NASA engineer and administrator

== See also ==
- Hervey Allen (1889–1949) American author
- Allen (surname)
