= Samuel Allen =

Samuel or Sam Allen may refer to:

- Samuel Allen (New Hampshire governor) (1635–1705), English proprietor and governor of the Province of New Hampshire
- Samuel Clesson Allen (1772–1842), American politician from Massachusetts
- Samuel Doyle Allen, member of the Georgia House of Representatives
- Samuel G. Allen, American lawyer, businessman, and industrialist
- Samuel Henderson Allen, member of the Maine House of Representatives
- Samuel Leeds Allen (1841–1918), American inventor
- Samuel Allen (bishop) (1844–1908), English Roman Catholic clergyman
- Samuel Allen (baseball) (born 1936), baseball player for the Negro leagues
- Samuel Allen (cricketer) (born 1943), Jamaican cricketer
- Samuel R. Allen (born c. 1953), American businessman, CEO of John Deere.
- Sam Allen (football manager) (1868–1946), English football manager
- Sam Allen (musician) (1909–1963), American jazz pianist
- Samuel W. Allen (1917–2015), American writer, literary scholar, and lawyer
- Samuel Allen (mountaineer), see Valley of the Ten Peaks
- Sam Allen (hurdler), winner of the 65 m hurdles at the 1937 USA Indoor Track and Field Championships
- Samuel Allen, commander of Fort Swatara in 1758

== See also ==
- Samantha Allen (disambiguation),
- Allen (surname)
