= Allan Rae =

Allan Rae may refer to:

- Allan Rae (composer) (born 1942), Canadian composer
- Allan Rae (cricketer) (1922–2005), Jamaican cricketer who played Test cricket for the West Indies

== See also ==
- Allen Rae (1932–2016), Canadian basketball referee
- Allan Ray (born 1984), American basketball player
- Ray Allen (disambiguation)
