= Albert Allen (disambiguation) =

Albert Allen (1867–1899) was an English footballer.

Albert Allen may also refer to:

- Albert Arthur Allen (1886–1962), American photographer
- Albert Robert Allen (1916–1992), known as Bob Allen, English footballer
- Bert Allen (Australian footballer), Albert Victor Edward 'Bert' Allen (1887–1975), Australian rules football player and umpire
- Jack Allen (footballer, born 1891), Albert John Allen (1891–1971), English footballer

== See also ==
- Bert Allen (disambiguation)
- Allen (surname)
