= Reginald Allen =

Reginald Allen may refer to:

- Reginald Allen (Australian cricketer) (1858–1952), Australian cricketer
- Reginald Allen (English cricketer) (1893–1950), English cricketer, played for Yorkshire 1921–25
- Reginald Allen, 1st Baron Allen of Hurtwood (1889–1939), British politician known as Clifford Allen
- Reg Allen (1919–1976), English football (soccer) goalkeeper
- Reg Allen (set decorator) (1917–1989)

== See also ==
- Allen (surname)
