= Bert Allen =

Bert Allen may refer to:

- Bert Allen (Australian footballer) (1887–1975), Richmond Football Club player
- Bert Allen (footballer, born 1883) (1883–1911), English footballer
- Bert Allen, character in The Lone Ranger (serial)

== See also ==
- Albert Allen (disambiguation)
- Robert Allen (disambiguation)
- Herbert Allen (disambiguation)
- Hubert Allen (disambiguation)
