= Leslie Allen =

Leslie Allen may refer to:

- Leslie Allen (cricketer) (born 1954), Australian cricketer
- Leslie Allen (racing driver) (1904–1977), American racecar driver
- Leslie Allen (tennis) (born 1957), retired American professional tennis player
- Leslie "Bull" Allen (1916–1982), Australian soldier, recipient of the United States’ Silver Star
- Leslie C. Allen, Old Testament scholar at Fuller Theological Seminary and Biblical commentator
- Leslie Holdsworth Allen (1879–1964), Australian academic and poet

== See also ==
- Leslie Allen Bellrichard (1941–1967), Medal of Honor recipient
- Allen (surname)
