= Peter Allen =

Peter or Pete Allen may refer to:

== Music ==
- Peter Allen (musician) (1944–1992), Australian songwriter and singer
- Peter Allen (composer) (born 1952), Canadian composer mainly known for his film scores
- Pete Allen (musician) (born 1954), English dixieland jazz clarinettist

== Politics ==
- Peter Allen (Australian politician) (c. 1855–1925), Australian politician
- Peter Allen (Alderney politician) (born 1965), member of the States of Alderney
- Peter Buell Allen (1775–1833), politician and military commander in New York State

== Sports ==
- Peter Allen (footballer) (1946–2023), holder of appearance record at Leyton Orient
- Peter Allen (ice hockey) (born 1970), Canadian former ice hockey defenceman
- Pete Allen (baseball) (1868–1946), American Major League Baseball catcher

== Broadcasting ==
- Peter Allen (UK broadcaster) (born 1946), British broadcaster, a main presenter of BBC Radio Five Live and former ITN correspondent
- Peter Allen (American broadcaster) (1920–2016), American broadcaster, host of the Metropolitan Opera radio broadcasts

== Other ==
- Sir Peter Allen (industrialist) (1905–1993), chairman of Imperial Chemical Industries
- Peter Allen (physician) (1921–2014), Canadian surgeon
- Peter Lewis Allen (born 1957), American executive coach, academic, and author
- Peter Allen (1943–1964), executed in England for the murder of John Alan West

== See also ==
- Peter Allan (disambiguation)
- Allen (surname)
