= Benjamin Allen =

Benjamin or Ben Allen may refer to:

- Benjamin Allen (British politician) (c. 1742–1791), British member of parliament for Bridgewater
- Benjamin Allen (clergyman) (1789–1829), American Episcopal clergyman
- Benjamin Allen (Wisconsin politician) (1807–1873), American lawyer, Civil War officer, and Wisconsin politician
- Benjamin F. Allen (1817–?), American lawyer and politician in the Florida House of Representatives
- Benjamin Allen (Canadian politician) (1830–1912), Canadian politician and retail merchant
- Benjamin Dwight Allen (1831–1914), American composer and organist
- Benjamin Allen (cartoonist) (1903–1971), American cartoonist
- Benjamin J. Allen (born 1947), American economist and university administrator
- Benjamin Franklin Allen (1829–1914), American politician, member of the Iowa Senate
- Ben Allen (California politician) (born 1978), American lawyer and politician
- Ben H. Allen, American record producer, mixer, and songwriter

== See also ==
- Ben Allan (born 1968), Australian rules footballer
- Percy Allen (politician) (Percy Benjamin Allen, 1913–1992), New Zealand politician
- Allen (surname)
