= Douglas Allen =

Douglas Allen may refer to:

- Douglas Allen, Baron Croham (1917–2011), British politician and civil servant
- Douglas Allen (philosopher) (born 1941), American philosopher, academic, author and activist
- Douglas W. Allen (born 1960), Canadian economist

== See also ==
- Douglas Allan (1896–1967), Scottish geologist and curator
- Doug Allen (disambiguation)
