= Ruth Allen =

Ruth Allen may refer to:

- Ruth Allen (singer), London cabaret artist and singer
- Ruth Allen (economist) (1889–1979)
- Ruth F. Allen (1879–1963), plant pathologist

== See also ==
- Allen (surname)
