= Oscar Allen =

Oscar Allen may refer to:

- Oscar Allen (footballer) (born 1999), Australian rules footballer
- Oscar Dana Allen (1836–1913), American professor of chemistry
- Oscar K. Allen (1882–1936), 42nd governor of Louisiana
