= William R. Allen =

William R. Allen may refer to:

- William R. Allen (economist) (1924–2021), American economist, professor and author
- William Allen (Canadian politician) (1919–1985)
- William Allen (Montana politician) (1871–1953), American politician and businessman
- William Allen (Utah architect) (1849–1928)
- William Reginald Allen (English cricketer) (1893–1950)
- William Rodney Allen, American author and former professor of English
- William Ross Allen (1869–1942), American politician and lawyer from Virginia
