= Roger Allen =

Roger Allen may refer to:

- Roger Allen (diplomat) (1909–1972), British ambassador to Greece, Iraq and Turkey
- Roger Allen (translator) (born 1942), British Arabist and translator
- Roger Allen (cross-country skier) (born 1952), Canadian cross-country skier and politician from Northwest Territories, Canada
- Roger MacBride Allen (born 1957), American science fiction author
- Roger Allen III (born 1986), American football player
- Roger Allen (musicologist) (born 1951), musicologist and dean of St Peter's College, Oxford

== See also ==
- Allen (surname)
