= Philip Allen =

Philip or Phillip Allen may refer to:

- Philip Allen, Baron Allen of Abbeydale (1912–2007), British civil servant
- Philip Allen (Wisconsin politician) (1832–1915), American politician from Wisconsin
- Philip Allen (Rhode Island politician) (1785–1865), American politician from Rhode Island
- Philip A. Allen (1953–2021), British geologist
- Philip K. Allen (1910–1996), American educator and politician in the Massachusetts Senate
- Phillip R. Allen (1939–2012), American stage, film, and television actor
- Phillip E. Allen, American engineer
- Philip Allen (footballer) (1902–1992), British footballer

== See also ==
- Allen (surname)
