= Arthur Allen =

Arthur Allen may refer to:

== Politicians ==
- Arthur Allen (died 1558), MP for Ludgershall
- Arthur Allen II (c. 1652–1710), 22nd Speaker of the Virginia House of Burgesses (1686–1688) as well as planter and officer opposing Bacon's Rebellion, son of the Arthur Allen (Virginia colonist) from whom he inherited Arthur Allen House
- Arthur Acland Allen (1868–1939), British Liberal Party politician, MP for Christchurch and Dunbartonshire
- Arthur Allen (Labour politician) (1887–1981), British politician

== Others ==
- Arthur Allen (author) (born 1959), American author and journalist
- Arthur Allen (Virginia colonist) (died 1669), commissioned Arthur Allen House and founded one of the First Families of Virginia
- Arthur A. Allen (1885–1964), American ornithologist
- Arthur Leigh Allen (1933–1992), American suspect in the Zodiac murders
- Arthur Allen (general) (1894–1959), Australian general

== See also ==
- Arthur Allen House
- Allen (surname)
