= Ronald Allen (disambiguation) =

Ronald Allen (1930–1991) was an English character actor.

Ronald, Ronnie, or Ron Allen may also refer to:

- Ron Allen (skateboarder) (born 1964), goofy-footed American skateboarder from Visalia, California
- Ronnie Allen (1929–2001), English football player and manager
- Ronnie Allen (pool player) (1938–2013), American pool player
- Ronald W. Allen (born c. 1942), American businessman
- Ronald J. Allen, John Henry Wigmore Professor of Law at Northwestern University
- Ron Allen (baseball) (born 1943), Major League Baseball first baseman
- Ron Allen (footballer) (1935–2006), English football fullback for Lincoln City
- Ron Allen (playwright) (1947–2010), American poet and playwright
- Ronald Wilberforce Allen (1889–1936), English lawyer and Liberal politician
- Ronald Allen, a pseudonym of Alan Ayckbourn

== See also ==
- Ron Allan (1924–1997), Australian rules footballer
- Allen (surname)
