= Dan Allen =

Dan or Daniel Allen may refer to:

- Dan Allen (American football) (1956–2004), American college football coach
- Dan Allen (gambler) (1832–1884), pioneer gambler in Omaha, Nebraska

== See also ==
- Danny Allan (born 1989), English rugby league player
- Allen (surname)
