= Bernard Allen =

Bernard Allen may refer to:

- Bernard Allen (Irish politician) (1944–2024), Irish Fine Gael politician
- Bernard Allen (American politician) (1937–2006), Democratic member of the North Carolina General Assembly
- Bernie Allen (born 1939), Major League Baseball player

== See also ==
- Allen (surname)
