= Samantha Allen =

Samantha Allen may refer to:

== People ==
- Sammantha Allen, convicted in the murder of Ame Deal
- Samantha Allen (dancer) in Les Noces (Robbins)
- Samantha Allen, played in 2005 Florida Gators softball team
- Samantha Leigh Allen, writer

== Fictional characters ==
- Samantha Allen, fictional character in books by Marietta Holley
- Samantha Allen, fictional character in Criminal Minds played by Hedy Burress

== See also ==
- Sam Allen (disambiguation)
