= Graham Allen =

Graham Allen may refer to:

- Graham Allen (politician) (born 1953), British Labour politician
- Graham Allen (footballer) (born 1977), English footballer
- Graham Allen (writer) (born 1963), British-born Irish writer and academic

== See also ==
- Graham Allan (1936–2007), English mathematician
- Allen (surname)
