= Steve Allen (disambiguation) =

Steve Allen (1921–2000) was an American television personality, musician, comedian, and writer.

Stephen, Steven or Steve Allen may also refer to:

== Public officials ==
- Stephen Allen (American politician) (1767–1852), New York mayor and state legislator
- Stephen Haley Allen (1847–1931), American associate justice of Kansas Supreme Court
- Stephen Allen (colonial administrator) (1882–1964), New Zealand politician and farmer
- Steven L. Allen, American brigadier general serving, since 2023, as Chief of Ordnance of the United States Army

== Creative artists ==
- Stephen B. Allen (born 1950), American filmmaker for Latter-day Saint church groups
- Steve Allen (singer), New Zealander who debuted 1974 hit "Join Together"
- Steve Allen, English lead vocalist with 1974 band Deaf School
- Steve Allen (radio presenter) (born 1954), English presenter on London-based UK National talk radio station LBC

== Others ==
- Steve Allen, original leader of 2008 Google Lunar X Dutch team Hakuto a/k/a White Label Space
- Charlie Steven Allen (born 2003), Northern Irish footballer

== See also ==
- Steven Allan (born 1956), Australian footballer
- Stephen Allan (born 1973), Australian golfer
- Allen (surname)
