= Sarah Allen (disambiguation) =

Sarah Allen (born 1980) is a Canadian actress.

Sarah Allen may also refer to:

- Sarah Allen (software developer), creator of Adobe After Effects, Adobe Shockwave, Flash video
- Sarah Allen (musician), flautist and accordionist, member of Flook
- Sarah Allen (missionary) (1764–1849), "Founding Mother" of the AME Church
- Sarah Addison Allen, American author

== See also ==
- Sarah Allan (born 1945), American historian
- Sarah Allan (footballer) (born 1997), Australian rules footballer
- Sarah Campbell Allan, American doctor
- Sara Allen (born 1954), American songwriter
- Allen (surname)
