= Peter Allan =

Peter Allan may refer to:

== Sports ==
- Peter Allan (Australian cricketer) (1935–2023)
- Peter Allan (footballer) (1935–1987), Australian rules footballer
- Peter Allan (rugby union) (born 1975), Scottish rugby union referee

== Others ==
- Peter Allan (landlord) (1799–1849), landlord of the Marsden Grotto pub
- Peter Allan (priest) (born 1950), Anglican monk and Principal of the College of the Resurrection
- Peter John Allan (1825–1848), Canadian poet

== See also ==
- Peter Allen (disambiguation)
