= Keith Allan =

Keith Allan may refer to:

- Keith Allan (linguist) (born 1943), Australian linguist
- Keith William Allan (1946–2000), Australian solicitor
- Keith Allan (actor) (born 1969), American actor and screenwriter

== See also ==
- Keith Allen (disambiguation)
