= Michael Allen =

Michael Allen may refer to:

== Arts and media ==
- Michael Allen (journalist) (born 1964), U.S. political reporter for Axios, formerly for Politico
- Mike Allen (poet) (born 1969), American writer of speculative fiction and speculative poetry
- Michael Allen, author of the literary blog Grumpy Old Bookman
- Mick Allen (musician), bass guitarist and vocals for Rema-Rema, The Wolfgang Press and The Models
- VL Mike (1976–2008), American rap artist from New Orleans, Louisiana

== Law ==
- Michael Allen (judge), Australian judge in the Local Court of New South Wales
- Michael J. Allen (born 1972), American lawyer
- Michael P. Allen (born 1967), American judge

== Politics ==
- Michael Allen (California politician) (born 1947), former member of the California State Assembly
- Mike Allen (New Brunswick politician) (born 1960), member of the Canadian House of Commons
- Mike Allen (Alberta politician) (born 1962), member of the Legislative Assembly of Alberta

== Sports ==
- Michael Allen (Canadian football) (born 1964), Canadian football player
- Michael Allen (cricketer) (1933–1995), English cricketer
- Michael Allen (footballer) (born 1949), English footballer
- Michael Allen (golfer) (born 1959), American golfer
- Michael Allen (rugby union) (born 1990), Irish rugby union player
- Mick Allan (1938–2021), Australian Olympic rower
- Mike Allen (cyclist) (born 1935), American cyclist

== Other ==
- Michael W. Allen (born 1946), American software engineer and author, CEO of Allen Interactions
- Michael Allen (air navigator) (1923–2001), British air navigator and radar operator of the Royal Air Force
- Michael Allen, American historian who co-authored A Patriot's History of the United States
- Michael Allen (architect), architect who designed the Rogers Centre (SkyDome) in Toronto
- Mike Allen, higher education leader and 7th president of Barry University

== See also ==
- Michael Allen Gillespie (born 1951), American philosopher
- Michael Allan (born 1983), American football tight end
- Allen (surname)
