= Brian Allen =

Brian Allen may refer to:

- Brian Allen (wide receiver) (born 1962), gridiron football wide receiver for the Edmonton Eskimos of the Canadian Football League
- Brian Allen (linebacker) (born 1978), American football linebacker for the St. Louis Rams, Carolina Panthers and Washington Redskins
- Brian Allen (running back) (born 1980), American football running back for the Indianapolis Colts and San Francisco 49ers
- Brian Allen (cornerback) (born 1993), American football cornerback
- Brian Allen (offensive lineman) (born 1995), American football offensive lineman
- Brian Allen, songwriter who co-wrote "What About Love"
- Brian Allen (art historian) (born 1952), British art historian

== See also ==
- Bryan Allen (disambiguation)
- Bryon Allen (born 1992), American basketball player
- Allen (surname)
