= Dennis Allen =

Dennis Allen may refer to:

- Dennis Allen (American football) (born 1972), American football coach and former NFL head coach of the Oakland Raiders and New Orleans Saints
- Dennis Allen (criminal) (1951–1987), Australian drug dealer
- Dennis Allen (footballer) (1939–1995), English association football player and manager
- Dennis Allen (comedian) (1940–1995)

== See also ==
- Denis Allen (disambiguation)
- Allen (surname)
