= Randy Allen =

Randy Allen may refer to:

- Randy Allen (American football) (born 1950), former American football player and current high school football coach
- Randy Allen (basketball) (born 1965), American basketball player

== See also ==
- Allen (surname)
