= Oliver Allen =

Oliver Allen may refer to:

- Oliver Allen (footballer) (born 1986), former English professional footballer
- Oliver Allen (speedway rider) (born 1982), former British motorcycle speedway rider

== See also ==
- David Oliver Allen (1800–1863), American missionary
- Allen (surname)
