= Alfred Allen =

Alfred Allen or Alf Allen may refer to:

- Alfred Allen (actor) (1886–1947), American silent film actor
- Alfred Allen (Australian politician) (1839–1917), New South Wales colonial politician
- Alfred Allen (executioner) (c. 1888–c. 1938), English executioner
- Alfred Allen, Baron Allen of Fallowfield (1914–1985), British life peer and trade unionist
- Alfred G. Allen (1867–1932), U.S. representative from Ohio
- Alf Allen (New Zealand politician) (1912–1987), New Zealand politician
- Alfie Allen (born 1986), English actor

== See also ==
- Allen (surname)
