= Mark Allen =

Mark Allen may refer to:

- Mark Allen (businessman) (born 1950), former British spy turned businessman and lecturer
- Mark Allen (triathlete) (born 1958), American world champion triathlete
- Bull Allen (rugby union) (Mark Richard Allen, born 1967), New Zealand international rugby football player
- Mark Allen (snooker player) (born 1986), Northern Irish snooker player
- Mark Allen (footballer) (born 1963), former Burnley, Tranmere Rovers and Runcorn football player
- Mark Allen (software developer), computer game programmer and designer
- Mark Allen (DJ), British deejay and producer
- Mark Allen (politician) (born 1949), American politician from Oklahoma
- Mark G. Allen (born 1962), professor specializing in microfabrication at the Georgia Institute of Technology
- Mark S. Allen (born 1965), American television host
- Mark W. Allen (1877–1958), American lumber dealer and politician
- Mark Johnston-Allen (born 1968), snooker player
- Mark Allen, founder of Machine Project

== See also ==
- Mark Allan, the comics character Molten Man
- Mark Allyn (born 1966), American actor
- Mark van Allen (born 1954), musician, recording engineer and producer
- Marcus Allen (disambiguation)
