= Rodney Allen =

Rodney Allen may refer to:

- Rodney Allen (musician)
- Rodney Allen, referee at 2010 FIFA Club World Cup
- Rodney Allen (American football), see 2008 Green Bay Packers season

== See also ==
- Roderick Allen (disambiguation)
- Allen (surname)
