= Damon Allen (disambiguation) =

Damon Allen (born 1963) is a retired Canadian Football League quarterback.

Damon Allen may also refer to:

- Damon Allen (figure skater), American former competitive figure skater
- Damon Allen, founding member of rock band Shurman

== See also ==
- Allen (surname)
