= Keith Allen =

Keith Allen may refer to:

- Keith Allen (actor) (born 1953), British actor
- Keith Allen (chess player) (born 1962), Irish chess player
- Keith Allen (footballer) (born 1943), English footballer
- Keith Allen (ice hockey) (1923–2014), Canadian hockey player/coach/executive
- Keith Allen (New Zealand politician) (1931–1984), New Zealand MP
- Keith Allen (Minnesota politician) (born 1977), member of the Minnesota House of Representatives
- Keith Allen (American football) (born 1974), American football coach
- Keith Allen (rugby union), Scottish rugby union referee

== See also ==
- Keith Allan (disambiguation)
- Allen (surname)
