= Bruce Allen =

Bruce Allen may refer to:

- Bruce Allen (American football) (born 1956), American football executive
- Bruce Allen (manager), Canadian manager of musical artists
- Bruce Allen (physicist) (born 1959), American physicist; director of the Max Planck Institute for Gravitational Physics
- Bruce C. Allen (c. 1955–2009), American guitarist in The Suburbs
- Bruce F. Allen (1917–1986), American politician
- Bruce Allen (drag racer) (born 1949/50), American drag racer

== See also ==
- Allen (surname)
