= Ian Allan =

Ian Allan may refer to:

- Ian Allan (politician) (1916–2000), Australian politician
- Ian Allan (publisher) (1922–2015), publisher who specialised in transport titles
  - His company, Ian Allan Publishing
- Ian Allan (RAF officer) (1918–1988), British RAF officer

== See also ==
- Ian Allen (disambiguation)
