= Terry Allen =

Terry Allen may refer to:

== Music ==
- Terry Allen (country singer) (born 1943), American country singer and artist
- Terry Allen (big band singer) (1916–1981), American big band singer
- Terry K. Allen, real name of DJ Slip (born 1964), American record producer

== Sports ==
- Terry Allen (American football coach) (born 1957), American football coach at Missouri State University
- Terry Allen (basketball) (born 1993), American professional basketball player
- Terry Allen (boxer) (1924–1987), English flyweight boxer
- Terry Allen (running back) (born 1968), American former running back for the Washington Redskins
- Magnum T. A. (born 1959), professional wrestler born Terry Allen

== Others ==
- Terry (Terril) Diener Allen who wrote as T. D. Allen with her husband Don Bala Allen
- Terry de la Mesa Allen Sr. (1888–1969), US Army general in World War II
- Terry de la Mesa Allen Jr., US Army Colonel killed at the Battle of Ong Tranh 17 October 1967

== See also ==
- Allen (surname)
