= Greg Allen =

Greg Allen or Gregory Allen may refer to:

- Greg Allen (American football) (born 1963), American gridiron football running back
- Greg Allen (baseball) (born 1993), American baseball outfielder
- Greg Allen (footballer) (born 1967), English footballer who played as a midfielder
- Greg Allen (rugby league) (1947–2009), Australian rugby league footballer who played in the 1970s

== See also ==
- Allen (surname)
- Gregory Allen Howard (1952–2023), American journalist, playwright and screenwriter
