= Ralph Allen (disambiguation) =

Ralph Allen (1693–1764) was an English entrepreneur and philanthropist, notable for his reforms to the UK postal system.

Ralph Allen may also refer to:

- Ralph Allen (journalist) (1913–1966), Canadian journalist, editor, and novelist
- Ralph G. Allen (1934–2004), American writer and scholar
- Ralph Allen (painter, born 1926) (1926–2019), Canadian painter
- Ralph Allen (painter, born 1952), Haitian painter
- Ralph Shuttleworth Allen (1817–1887), British Conservative Member of Parliament 1868–1879
- Ralph Allen (footballer) (1906–1981), English professional footballer
- Ralph O. Allen, professor of chemistry and environmental sciences

== See also ==
- Allen (surname)
