= Ian Allen =

Ian Allen may refer to:

- Ian Allen (cricketer) (born 1965), West Indian cricketer
- Ian Allen (gridiron football) (born 1978), American and Canadian football offensive lineman
- Ian Allen (footballer) (1932–2018), Scottish footballer
- Ian Allen (a.k.a. DJ Spatts) (died 2023), member of the Criminal Minds
- Ian Allen, member of the band Negativland

== See also ==
- Allen (surname)
- Ian Allan (disambiguation)
