= Craig Allen =

Craig Allen may refer to:

- Craig Allen (footballer) (born 1959), former Guernsey football (soccer) player
- Craig Allen (meteorologist) (born 1957), New York meteorologist
- Craig B. Allen (born 1957), American diplomat and ambassador
- Craig R. Allen, American ecologist and resilience scientist

== See also ==
- Allen (surname)
- Allen Craig, American baseball player
