= Martin Allen (disambiguation) =

Martin Allen (born 1965) is an English football manager and a retired footballer.

Martin Allen may also refer to:

- Martin Allen (entrepreneur) (1931–2009), American computer company founder
- Martin Allen (writer), English playwright and screenwriter
- Martin F. Allen (1842–1927), American banker, businessman, farmer and politician from Vermont
- Martin Allen (numismatist), British numismatist and historian
- Martin Allen (publicist) (born 1958), Welsh publicist and historical revisionist
- Disappearance of Martin Allen (1964–1979)

== See also ==
- Marty Allen (1922–2018), American stand-up comedian and actor
- Allen (surname)
