= Patrick Allen =

Patrick Allen may refer to:

- Patrick Allen (actor) (1927–2006), British actor
- Patrick Allen (music educator) (born 1955), English author
- Patrick Allen (American football) (1961–2021), American football player
- Patrick Allen (bowler) (born 1970), American ten-pin bowler
- Patrick Allen (governor-general) (born 1951), Governor-General of Jamaica

== See also ==
- Patrick Allan (fl. 1911–1924), Scottish footballer
- Allen Patrick (born 1984), American football player
- Allen (surname)
