= Kenneth Allen =

Kenneth or Kenny Allen may refer to:

== Sports ==
- Kenny Allen (archer) (born 1969), British Paralympic archer
- Kenny Allen (racing driver) (born 1956), former driver in the Craftsman Truck Series
- Kenny Allen (footballer) (born 1948), retired English professional football goalkeeper
- Kenny Allen (American football) (born 1994), American football punter and placekicker

== Others ==
- Kenneth Allen (murderer) (born 1942), American convicted murderer
- Kenneth Allen (physicist) (1923–1997), professor of nuclear physics at the University of Oxford, England
- Kenneth Radway Allen (1911–2008), New Zealand fisheries biologist
- Admiral Tibet (Kenneth Allen, born 1960), Jamaican reggae singer

== See also ==
- Ken Allen (1971–2000), name given to a Bornean orangutan at the San Diego Zoo
- Allen (surname)
