= Hubert Allen =

Hubert Allen may refer to:

- Hubert Allen, manager of Yelloway Motor Services
- Morgantina#Hubert Allen and the University of Illinois
- Hubert Allison Allen (1872–1942), American general
- Hubert Raymond Allen (1919–1987), Royal Air Force officer

== See also ==
- Bert Allen (disambiguation)
