= Frank Allen =

Frank Allen may refer to:

== Law and politics ==
- Frank Augustus Allen (1835–1916), American politician in Massachusetts
- Frank D. Allen (1850–1910), American attorney and politician in Massachusetts
- Frank G. Allen (1874–1950), American politician, Governor of Massachusetts
- Frank Allen (politician) (1882–1948), Australian politician
- Frank M. Allen (1923–1999), American politician in Pennsylvania

== Sports ==
- Frank Gates Allen (1858–1940), American football player and businessman
- Frank Allen (baseball) (1888–1933), American baseball player
- Frank Allen (footballer, born 1901) (1901–1989), English footballer
- Frank Allen (Australian footballer) (1926–2018), Australian rules footballer
- Frank Allen (footballer, born 1927) (1927–2014), English footballer

== Others ==
- Frank Shaver Allen (1860–1934), American architect
- Frank Allen (physicist) (1874–1965), Canadian physicist
- Frank A. Allen, Jr. (1896–1979), Major General, U.S. Army
- Bunny Allen (Frank Maurice Allen, 1906–2002), English white hunter and safari guide in Kenya
- Frank Allen (bassist) (born 1943), English bass guitarist
- Frank Allen (chemist) (1944–2014), English crystallographer

== See also ==
- Francis Allen (disambiguation)
- Frank Allan (1849–1917), Australian cricketer
- Frank Allan (bishop) (1935–2019), bishop of Atlanta
- Allen (surname)
