= Jason Allen =

Jason or Jay Allen may refer to:

- Jason Allen (American football) (born 1983), American football cornerback
- Jason Allen (cyclist) (born 1981), New Zealand cyclist
- Jason Allen (politician) (born 1963), American politician in Michigan
- Jason Allen (rugby league) (born 1975), Australian rugby league footballer of the 1990s
- Jason Michael Allen, creator of Théâtre D'opéra Spatial
- Jason K. Allen, president of Midwestern Baptist Theological Seminary
- Jay Allen (1900–1972), American journalist
- Jay Allen (baseball) (born 2002), American baseball player
