= Jerome Allen =

Jerome Allen may refer to:

- Jerome Allen (author) (1830–1894), American educator and author
- Jerome Allen (basketball) (born 1973), American basketball coach and former player
- Jerry Seinfeld (Jerome Allen Seinfeld; born 1954), American comedian and actor
- Rome Streetz (born 1989; Jerome Allen), American rapper

== See also ==
- Allen (surname)
