= Herbert Allen =

Herbert Allen may refer to:

- Herbert A. Allen Sr. (1908–1997), American stockbroker
- Herbert Allen Jr. (born 1940), American businessman
- Herbert Allen (inventor) (1907–1990), American inventor
- Herbert Allen III (born 1966/7), American businessman
- Herbert Allen, one of two British executioners of the 1950s named "Harry Allen"
- H. Stanley Allen (1873–1954), English physicist
- Todd Allen (baseball) (Herbert Todd Allen, 1885–1971), Negro leagues third baseman

== See also ==
- Bert Allen (disambiguation)
