= Cory Allen =

Cory Allen may refer to:

- Cory Allen (author) (born 1982), American musician, composer, record label owner
- Cory Allen (rugby union) (born 1993), Welsh rugby union player

== See also ==
- Corey Allen (1934–2010), American film and television director, producer, writer and actor
- Allen (surname)
