= Andrew Allan =

Andrew Allan may refer to:

- Andrew Allan (radio executive) (1907–1974), national head of CBC Radio Drama
- Andrew Allan (artist) (1863–1942), British lithographic artist
- Andrew Allan (shipowner) (1822–1901), Scottish-born Canadian businessman and financier
- Andy Allan (1869–1916), Australian rules footballer

== See also ==
- Andrew Allen (disambiguation)
