= Gordon Allen =

Gordon Allen may refer to:

- Gordon P. Allen (1929–2010), Democratic member of the North Carolina General Assembly
- Gordon F. Allen (1908–1973), professor and administrator at the State University of New York at Brockport

== See also ==
- Allen (surname)
