= Roderick Allen =

Roderick Allen may refer to:

- Roderick R. Allen (1894–1970), Major General of the U.S. Army
- Rod Allen (born 1959), baseball analyst
- Rod Allen (advertising executive) (1929–2007)

== See also ==
- Rodney Allen (disambiguation)
- Allen (surname)
