= Bryan Allen =

Bryan Allen may refer to:

- Bryan Allen (hang glider) (born 1952), American hang glider pilot and bicyclist
- Bryan Allen (ice hockey) (born 1980), Canadian hockey player

== See also ==
- Brian Allen (disambiguation)
- Bryon Allen (born 1992), American basketball player
- Bryn Allen (1921–2005), Welsh international footballer
- Allen (surname)
