= Anita Allen =

Anita Allen may refer to:

- Dame Anita Allen (judge) (born 1947), Bahamian judge
- Anita Allen (pentathlete) (born 1977), American officer and pentathlete
- Anita L. Allen (born 1953), American scholar

== See also ==
- Allen (surname)
