= Malcolm Allen =

Malcolm Allen may refer to:

- Malcolm Allen (swimmer) (born 1973), Australian swimmer
- Malcolm Allen (footballer) (born 1967), Welsh footballer
- Malcolm Allen (politician) (born 1953), Canadian politician
- Malcolm Allen (tennis) (born 1967), American tennis player
- Malcolm Allen, a semifinalist from the thirteenth season of American Idol

== See also ==
- Allen (surname)
