= Clarence Allen =

Clarence Allen may refer to:

- Clarence Ray Allen (1930–2006), American prison inmate who was executed by lethal injection
- Clarence Emir Allen (1852–1932), U.S. representative from Utah
- Clarence R. Allen (1925–2021), American geologist, member of the National Academy of Sciences

== See also ==
- Allen (surname)
