= Denis Allen =

Denis Allen may refer to:

- Denis Allen (diplomat) (1910–1987), British diplomat
- Denis Allen (politician) (1896–1961), Irish Fianna Fáil TD for Wexford
- Denis Allen (singer), singer/songwriter based in County Limerick, Ireland
- Dinny Allen (born 1952), Irish Gaelic footballer (County Cork)

== See also ==
- Dennis Allen (disambiguation)
- Allen (surname)
