= Chris W. Allen =

American academic (born 1956)

- Born: February 3, 1956 (age 70)
- Occupation: Professor
- Awards: Fulbright scholar 2011-2012

Academic background
- Education: University of Missouri
- Thesis: Coast to coast and border to border : the influence of Jack Shelley on broadcast journalism (1996)

Chris Allen (born 1956) is a professor in the College of Communication, Fine Arts and Media at the University of Nebraska at Omaha (UNO). A Fulbright scholar, he has lectured on investigative journalism and freedom of the press in Afghanistan and Oman.

== Education and career ==
Allen graduated from Iowa State University with a BA in journalism and mass communication in 1979, and began his career as a disk jockey at KBOE-AM/FM in Oskaloosa, Iowa while in high school. Later he was a news reporter for KASI Radio in Ames, Iowa, and worked at KRNT-AM in Des Moines, Iowa. In 1985, he returned to Iowa State, and was awarded a master's degree in 1987. He received a PhD in journalism from the University of Missouri in 1996. He served as an associate professor at the University of North Dakota School of Communication from 1987 to 1992, and in 1996 Allen began teaching at the University of Nebraska Omaha.

In 2010, Allen taught at the University of Kabul Center for Afghanistan Studies and School of Communication. Funded by a grant from the US State Department to help develop the university's journalism program, Allen's students included undergraduates and educators. In addition to teaching journalism skills such as how to shoot video and how to write a TV script, Allen lectured on the role of social networking in the modern media and the importance of investigative journalism in the United States. In 2011-2012, he taught at Sultan Qaboos University (SQU) in Oman as a member of the mass communications faculty and spoke at the first annual US Fulbright Conference at the US Embassy in Oman.

Allen is the general manager of UNO Television, and a former member of the board of directors for the Omaha Press Club. He served previously as the organization's president.

== Personal life ==
Allen, who grew up in Oskaloosa, Iowa, writes about his teaching and traveling experiences for the online journal Unheralded Fish. He and his wife Elaine have two children.

== Selected publications ==
- Allen, Chris W.; Lipschultz, Jeremy Harris; and Hilt, Michael L., "Local Television Journalism: Developing Ethics through Discussion" (2001). Communication Faculty Publications. Paper 61.
- Turner, L. J.; C. W. Allen (1997). "Mexican and Latino Media Behavior in Los Angeles: The 1996 Election Example". American Behavioral Scientist. 40 (7): 884–901. doi:10.1177/0002764297040007004. ISSN 0002-7642. S2CID 145113866.
- Allen, Chris W.; Lipschultz, Jeremy Harris; and Hilt, Michael L., "Ethics in Local Television Newsrooms: A Comparison of Assignment Editors and Producers" (2002). Communication Faculty Publications. Paper 47.
- Allen, Chris W. (2000). "Reporting World War II for the Local Audience". American Journalism. 17 (1): 35–52. doi:10.1080/08821127.2000.10739221. ISSN 0882-1127. S2CID 147464577.
- Singer, J. B.; D. Craig; C. W. Allen; V. Whitehouse; A. Dimitrova; K. P. Sanders (1996). "Attitudes of Professors and Students about New Media Technology". Journalism & Mass Communication Educator. 51 (2): 36–45. doi:10.1177/107769589605100205. ISSN 1077-6958. S2CID 144370953.
