= Jules Allen =

Jules Allen may refer to:

- Jay and Jules Allen (1890–1942 and 1888–1964 respectively), American film exhibitors in Canada
- Jules T. Allen (born 1947), American photographer, author, and educator
- Jules Verne Allen (1883-1945), American country music singer-songwriter, writer, and cowboy
