= Jason Allen (rugby league) =

Australian rugby league footballer (born 1975)

Personal information
- Full name: Jason Allen
- Born: 26 September 1975 (age 50) Rockhampton, Queensland, Australia

Playing information
- Position: Fullback
Club
Years	Team	Pld	T	G	FG	P
1998	Newcastle Knights	2	0	0	0	0
- Source: As of 14 Jul 2021

Jason Allen (born 26 September 1975) is a former professional rugby league footballer who played in the 1990s. He played for the Australian club the Newcastle Knights in 1998.
