= Chris Allen (author) =

Australian thriller writer (born 1964)

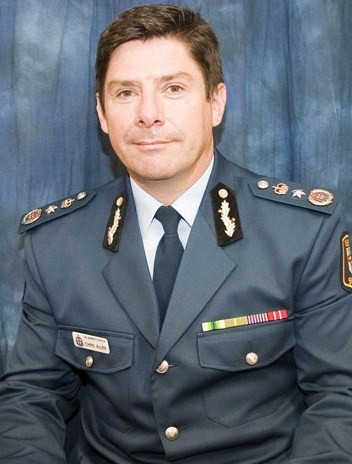
- Allen, Sheriff of New South Wales (2008)
- Born: 7 December 1964 (age 61); Perth, Western Australia
- Occupation: Thriller writer
- Children: Morgan and Rhett Allen
- Writing career
- Period: 1999–present
- Notable work: Defender: Intrepid 1, Hunter: Intrepid 2, Avenger: Intrepid 3, Helldiver: Intrepid 4, Ranger: Intrepid 5

Chris Allen is an Australian thriller writer, based in Wollongong, Australia. A former paratrooper, Allen has also served as Security Manager for the international aid agency CARE in Timor Leste; with the Australian Protective Service; and for the Government of New South Wales as Head of Security for the Sydney Opera House and as Sheriff of NSW. He self-published his first novel, Defender of the Faith, in 2011. In 2012 Allen was offered a contract for two books with Pan Macmillan's digital imprint Momentum, followed in 2014 by a contract for a further two books and 2016 for a further book, a novella. The Intrepid series has been optioned for film and television.

Following a period of hiatus, Allen announced that he is developing the first trilogy in his Intrepid series to be called The Dark Heart Trilogy. He has also announced the development of a new thriller, featuring a new protagonist. Both works are intended for publication 2022-2023

== Career ==
Allen served with the Australian Army, including an exchange posting with the New Zealand Army and later with the British Army's 5 Airborne Brigade, before leaving the military due to injuries. Following retirement from the army Allen led security operations for an international aid agency in East Timor in 1999. Post 9/11, he served within Australia's government protective security and law enforcement environment. He was headhunted to take over the protection of the Sydney Opera House after the 'No War' incident of 2003. In 2008 he was appointed Sheriff of New South Wales, a post he held until 2011.

In recent years Allen undertook a number of Australian Government and New South Wales Government senior executive appointments, including as a Director and Assistant Secretary of Australian Classification, Chief Operating Officer of Venues NSW, and as a Director with the NSW Department of Planning and Environment. Allen has also served as a member of the Classification Review Board 2018–2022.

== Bibliography ==
The Alex Morgan Interpol spy thriller series includes the following titles:

- Defender (November 2012)
- Hunter (December 2012)
- Avenger (January 2015)
- Helldiver (November 2015)
- Ranger (April 2016)

== Reception ==
Reviews of Allen's work generally agree that the author leverages his life and work experience to good effect. The main character of the Intrepid series, Alex Morgan, is a former army Major, as was Allen; plot twists in the series often mirror Allen's career. The Australian Army Newspaper wrote concerning Hunter that "Allen knows his weapons and aircraft particularly well, and his immense attention to detail shows he has obviously walked the streets of the cities where his character's actions take place."

== Personal life ==
Allen is divorced and lives with sons Morgan and Rhett on the NSW South Coast, Australia.
