= Francis Allen (Jesuit) =

Belgian Jesuit

Francis Allen (c. 1645 – 22 March 1712) was a Belgian Jesuit. He was admitted into the Society of Jesus on 9 October 1678, and died at Liège on 22 March 1712, at the age of 67.
