= Murder of Andrew Allen =

2012 murder in Ireland

- Part of Dissident Irish republican campaign
- Location: 55°6′44.784″N 7°27′51.1236″W; Ludden, Buncrana, County Donegal, Ireland
- Date: 9 February 2012; 14 years ago approx. 9.20pm
- Attack type: Punishment shooting
- Weapon: Shotgun
- Victim: Andrew Allen
- Perpetrator: Republican Action Against Drugs
- Motive: Alleged to be a drug dealer
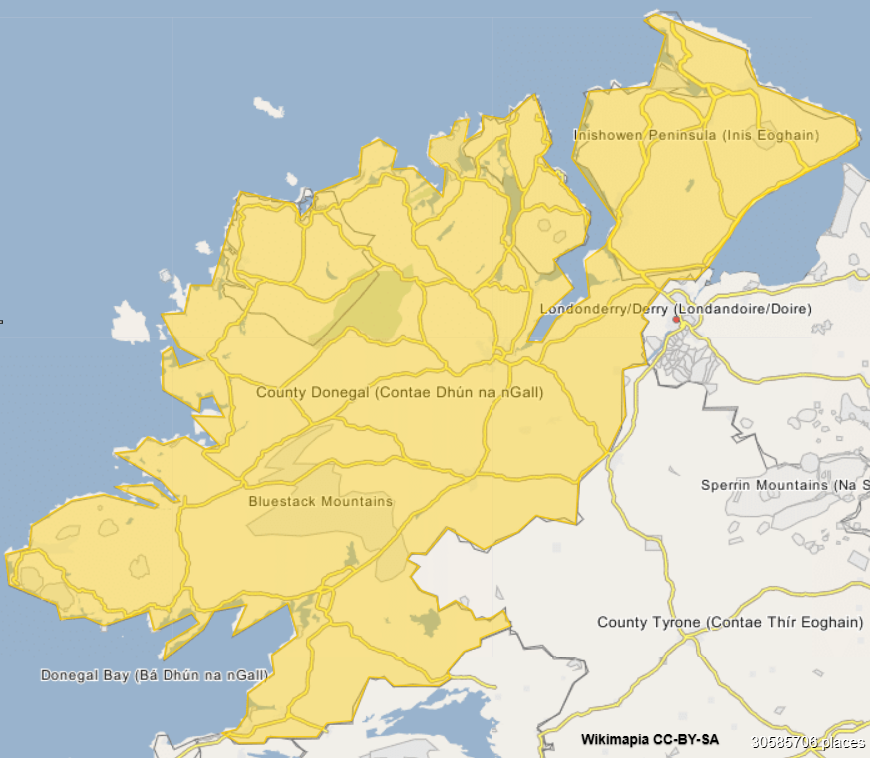
- Murder location Murder of Andrew Allen (Ireland)

Andrew Allen (c. 1987 – 9 February 2012) was an Irish murder victim.

A native of Derry, Allen was one of over thirty natives of Derry who had been forced from their homes by the Irish republican vigilante group calling itself Republican Action Against Drugs, or RAAD (which in July 2012 merged into the New IRA).

However while RAAD claimed responsibility for the murder, friends and family believe that another dissident organisation was involved and that the modus operandi and murder weapon was more likely linked to the Real IRA, which later joined RAAD in forming the New IRA. The Real IRA has been the subject of claims that MI5 involvement in a previous murder was covered up.

RAAD claimed that Allen was a drug dealer (a charge denied by his family). Allen had left Derry after his name was contained in a threat sent by an unnamed group to a local community centre in the Waterside area of Derry, though he was told several weeks later he was no longer under threat. Allen moved to Ludden outside Buncrana, County Donegal, where he lived with his partner and her two children. He was shot dead at approximately 9.20 p.m. on 9 February 2012 by three masked gunmen. Shortly afterwards, a car believed to have been used in the murder was found ablaze near Fahan, three miles away. RAAD admitted responsibility for his death on 22 February, claiming they would kill a number of other individuals they claimed were drug dealers.

Derry-based priest Fr Michael Canny claimed a group called Republican Action Against Drugs was responsible for the attack on Allen. "At some stage last year between the Waterside and Cityside areas as many as 36 or 37 people have been exiled from their community and families." He added that Allen was the first of the Derry exiles to be killed. Allen's partner stated he was previously involved in drugs, but had ceased since at least 2010.

As of 2023, six individuals had been arrested and questioned about the murder, but that the killer has yet to be found.
