= Christopher Allen =

Christopher Allen may refer to:

- Christopher Allen (cricketer) (1944–2012), English cricketer
- Christopher Allen (critic) (born 1953), Australian art critic
- Christopher Allen (American football) (born 1998), American football linebacker
- Chris Cross (1952–2024), real name Christopher Allen, musician with Ultravox
- Christopher Cordley Allen, guitarist with Neon Trees

== See also ==
- James Christopher Allen (active since 1992), American guitarist
- Chris Allen (disambiguation)
- Christopher Allen Bouchillon (1893–1968), American country music and blues musician
