= Benjamin Allen (clergyman) =

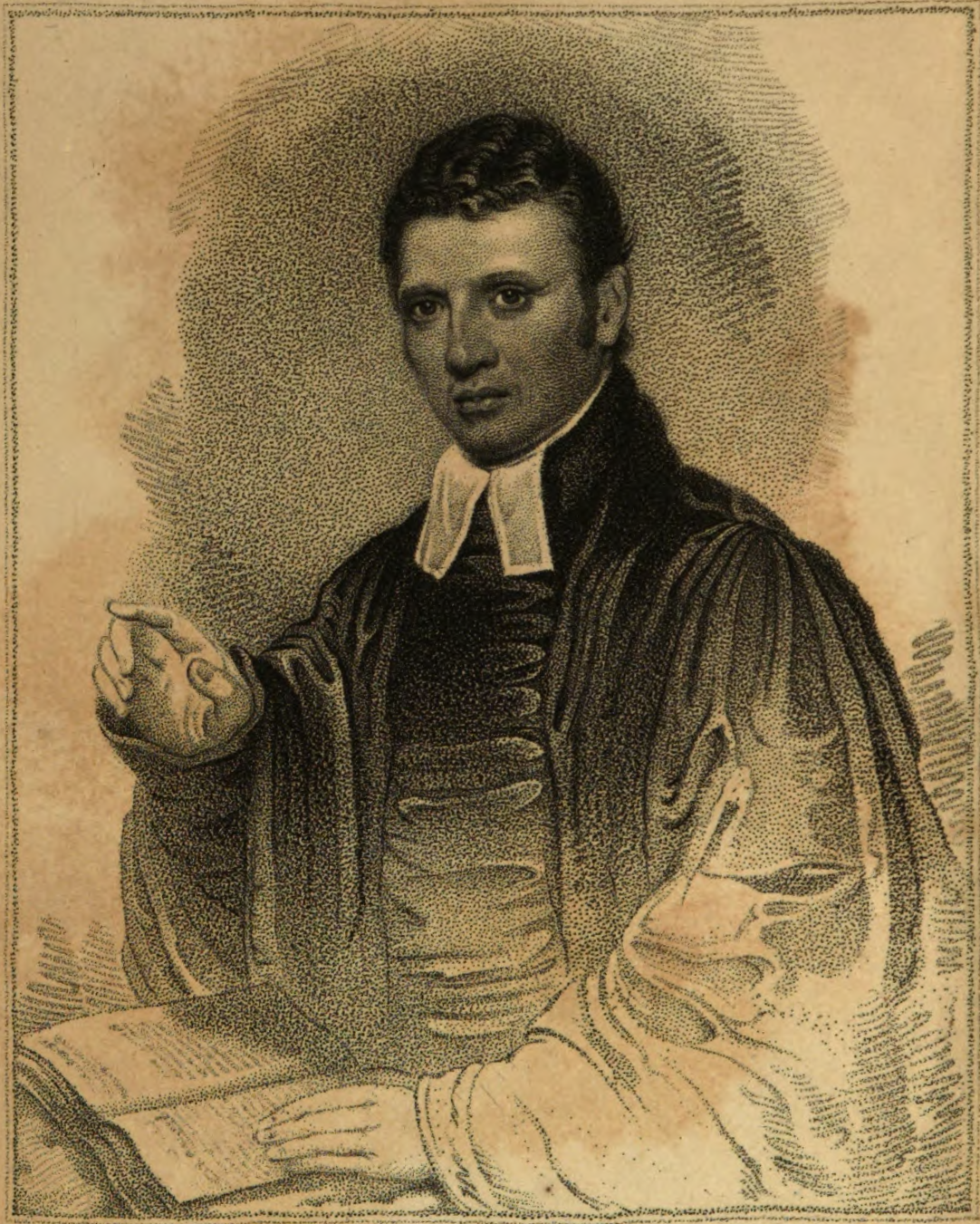
- Born: September 29, 1789; Hudson
- Died: January 13, 1829 at sea
- Occupations: Clergyman, author, Minister

Benjamin Allen (September 29, 1789 – January 13, 1829) was an American Episcopal clergyman.

Benjamin Allen was born on September 29, 1789, in Hudson, New York. He was educated a Presbyterian, but united with the Episcopal church and became a lay reader, laboring among the African-American population of Charleston, Va.; then a deacon, and in 1818 a priest. He published in 1815 the weekly Layman's Magazine, and in 1820 an abridgment of Burnet's History of the Reformation. In 1821 he was chosen rector of St. Paul's Church, Philadelphia. In 1827 he established a printing-house for the publication of tracts and printing of prayer-books. He published Christ and Him Crucified and Living Manners, a tale (1822); History of the Church of Christ (1823–'24); The Parent's Counsellor, a Narrative of the Newton Family, and a "Sketch of the Life of Dr. Pilmore," his predecessor in St. Paul's Church (1825). See Memoirs by his brother Thomas G. Allen (Philadelphia, 1832).

Benjamin Allen died on January 13, 1829, at sea.
