= Rebecca Allen =

Rebecca Allen may refer to:

- Rebecca Allen (artist) (born 1953), American international artist
- Rebecca Allen (basketball) (born 1992), Australian basketball player
