= Kate Allen =

Kate or Katie Allen may refer to:

- Kate Allen (Amnesty International) (born 1955), director of Amnesty International UK
- Kate Allen (triathlete) (born 1970), Australian triathlete
- Kate Slatter (born 1971), Australian rower whose married name is Kate Allen
- Katie Allen (field hockey) (born 1974), Australian Olympic field hockey player
- Katie Allen (politician) (1966–2025), Australian medical researcher and politician

== See also ==
- Allen (surname)
