= Kevin Allen (author) =

American writer

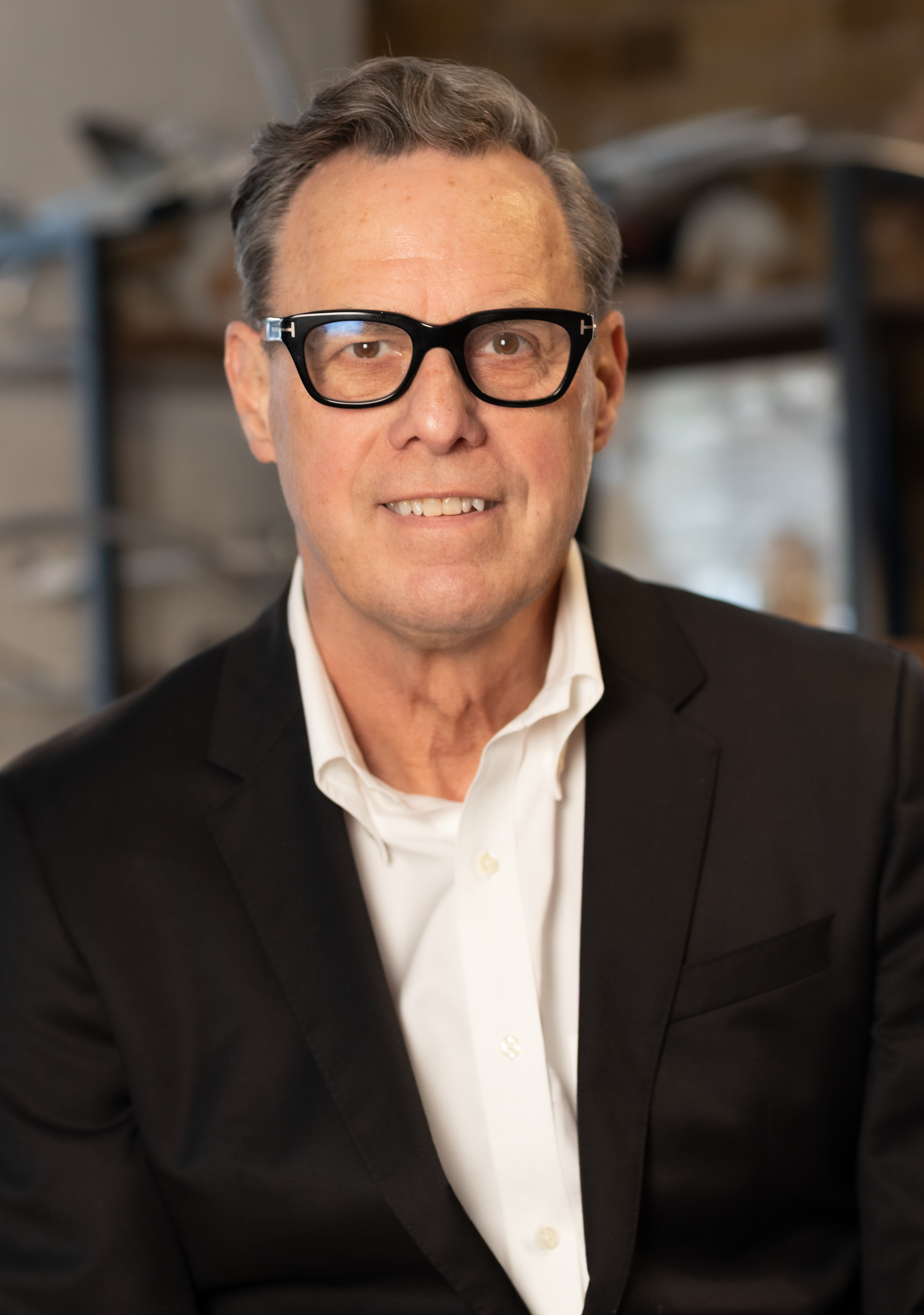
Kevin Allen (author)

Kevin Allen (born September 17, 1954, United States) is an American bestselling author, business growth consultant and speaker. He has written two books, The Hidden Agenda: A Proven Way to Win Business and Create a Following, which was a Wall Street Journal bestseller, and The Case of the Missing Cutlery: A Leadership Course for the Rising Star.

== Early career ==
In his career in business development Allen held positions with McCann WorldGroup, The Interpublic Group, Lowe Worldwide.

- McCann WorldGroup - Executive Vice President, Worldwide Director of Global Accounts
- McCann WorldGroup - Executive Vice President, Director of Corporate Development
- Interpublic Group - Chief Growth Officer
- Lowe Worldwide - Vice Chairman

In all roles, Allen was responsible for spearheading multinational new business initiatives and integrated marketing campaigns to key global clients. For example, during his time at McCann WorldGroup, Allen led the team responsible for a number of global new business wins including MasterCard, Siemens, Microsoft Europe and Lufthansa. He was responsible for the cross-discipline servicing of multinational accounts like L'Oreal, GM, Unilever and Nestle. As Lowe Worldwide Vice Chairman he played a pivotal role in the turnaround that named the company Ad Age's “Turnaround Agency of the Year” in 2009.

== Published work ==
Allen's debut book, The Hidden Agenda: A Proven Way to Win Business and Create a Following (published by Bibliomotion, April 2012) is aimed at sharing his own insights into the world of sales and marketing The book shares techniques Allen used as a "pitch man" working for advertising holding companies, specifically noting experiences with major brands such as MasterCard, Lufthansa, Marriott International, Johnson & Johnson, and others.

"This entertaining book moves at a rapid clip and is full of lively anecdotes of hard-won advertising campaigns. From MasterCard's iconic "Priceless" campaign to Rudy Giuliani's mayoral campaign, Kevin Allen has seen first-hand how to effectively find, connect, and speak to the Hidden Agenda to win business unfailingly, every time." Google Books review, 17 April 2012

Allen's second book, The Case of the Missing Cutlery: A Leadership Course for the Rising Star, weaves a "Gladwellian" personal anecdote involving missing cutlery into a course on emotionally intelligent leadership. Allen discusses the case of the missing cutlery on BBC Radio's Four Thought talk series on July 7, 2013. Allen's third book Emotify! The Power of the Human Element in Game-based Learning, Serious Games and Experiential Education was co-written with Dr. Michael J. Sutton and published in 2019.

== KevinAllenPartners Inc. and E I Games ==
In 2010, Allen started a growth consulting firm KevinAllenPartners Company. In June 2012, KevinAllenPartners Company rebranded under the name rekap Inc. specializing in growth readiness, leadership and business training. The company has offices in London, England and New York City, New York. In 2013, he launched E I Games LLC, which specializes in award-winning emotional intelligence leadership and sales training games.

== College and University ==
Kevin is an adjunct professor of Marketing and Advertising beginning in 2019. He teaches graduate and undergraduate courses both on a live, online, and asynchronous basis.

Kevin holds a PhD in management with a specialization in Organizational Psychology.
