= Katherine Allen (Washington politician) =

American politician

Member of the Washington House of Representatives
- In office 1983–1988

Personal details
- Born: 17 June 1925
- Died: 7 June 1988 (aged 62)
- Party: Republican

Katherine “Katie” Yarnell Allen (17 June 1925 – 7 June 1988) was an American politician who was a member of the Washington House of Representatives for the Republican Party from 1983 to 1988.

== Early life and education ==
Allen was born in Colorado. Allen attended the University of Denver, where she earned a B.A. in Economics.

== Career ==
Allen eventually moved to Edmonds, Washington, where she ran for a position on the school board in 1973. As part of her campaign, she criticized her opponent for his membership in the Washington Education Association and argued that teachers should not be on school boards. She won the election with 58.97% of the vote. While serving on the school board, she found herself at odds with the district's teachers, who voted no confidence in the system's superintendent in 1976. The following year, she ran for a position on the Edmonds City Council, winning by only 47 votes. In 1979, she ran for Mayor of Edmonds, but lost in the general election to Tom Carns.

In 1981, Allen proposed pay raises for city officials, including doubling the pay rate for members of the City Council. She ran for re-election to the Council that same year, winning a second term. The following year, 1982, she ran for election to the state Washington House of Representatives, winning a seat representing the 21st legislative district. While serving in the House, she was a member of the Higher Education Committee. In 1984, her re-election campaign was endorsed by the Washington State Labor Council, making her one of only a small number of Republicans to receive their endorsement. Her 1986 re-election campaign was endorsed by the Tri-City Herald. After her death in 1988, she was succeeded by Jeannette Wood.

Despite being a registered Republican, Allen was known for being willing to vote with Democrats. She was the lone Republican to support the 1983 supplemental budget and also crossed party lines to support a bias settlement in 1984. In 1985, she supported a bill calling for reparations for Japanese Americans interred during World War II, and she supported an anti-apartheid bill in 1986. In 1988, she was one of only two Republicans to support increasing Washington's minimum wage to $4.24 an hour. She also advocated for women's involvement in politics, saying that women "don't get hung up on on making hero speeches" and were more focused on the work of government.

== Personal life ==
Allen was married and had three daughters. While serving on the Edmonds City Council, she also served as a member of the Puget Sound Health Systems Agency. She died from cancer on June 7, 1988.
