= C. J. Allen =

C. J. or CJ Allen may refer to:

- C. J. Allen (sculptor) (1862–1956), British sculptor
- Cecil J. Allen (1886–1973), British railway engineer and writer
- C. J. Allen (actor) (fl. 1982–2006), British actor
- CJ Allen (hurdler) (born 1995), American track and field competitor
- CJ Allen (American football) (born 2005), American football player
