= Frances Allen (disambiguation) =

Frances Allen (1932–2020) was an American computer scientist.

Frances Allen may also refer to:

- Frances J. Allen, Canadian general
- Frances Margaret Allen or Fanny Allen (1784–1819), Roman Catholic nun
- Frances Stebbins Allen (1854–1941), American photographer
- Frances Elizabeth Allan or Betty Allan (1905–1952), Australian statistician
- Frances Daisy Emery Allen (1876–1958), pioneering physician in Fort Worth, Texas

== See also ==
- Francis Allen (disambiguation)
