= Douglas Allen (philosopher) =

American academic and activist

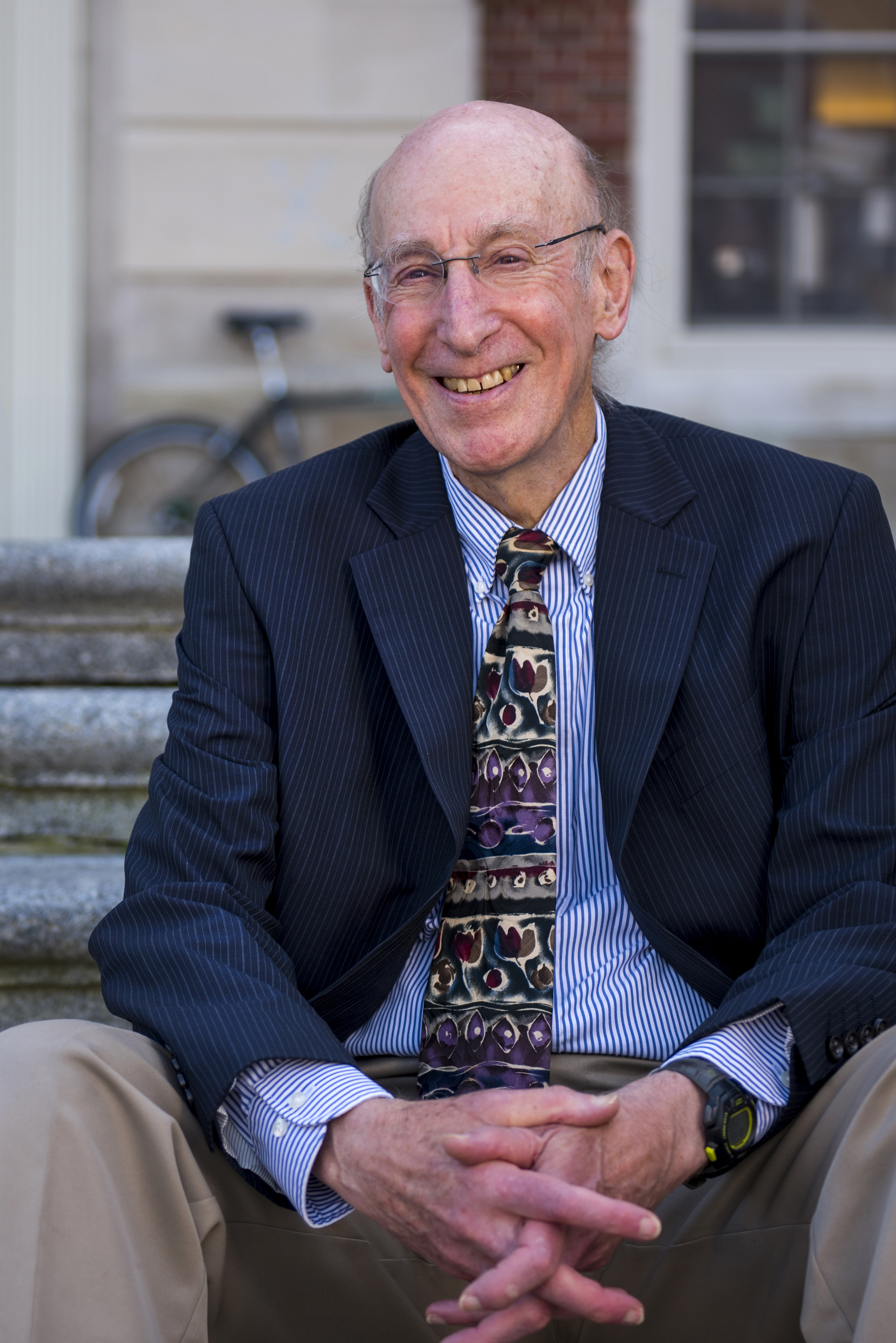
- Born: June 15, 1941 (age 85)
- Occupations: Philosopher, academic and author
- Awards: Distinguished Maine Professor Award, University of Maine; Hands of Peace Award, Peace and Justice Center of Eastern Maine; Faculty Excellence Award, University of Maine Alumni Association; Steve Gould Award, University of Maine

Academic background
- Education: B.A., Philosophy; M.A., Philosophy; Ph.D., Philosophy
- Alma mater: Yale University; Vanderbilt University
- Thesis: "The History of Religions and Eliade’s Phenomenology"

Douglas Allen is an American philosopher, academic, author and an activist. He is a Professor Emeritus of Philosophy and a Founder of Maine Peace Action Committee at the University of Maine.

Allen’s research focuses on phenomenology of religion and the philosophy of Mahatma Gandhi. He has also studied comparative philosophy and religion, Marxism and political philosophy along with Asian philosophy and religion, with a focus on Hinduism and Buddhism. He knew Mircea Eliade and has conducted extensive research on his phenomenology of religion. Allen is an author of numerous research papers along with 16 books and 150 book chapters. His books include Structure and Creativity in Religion: Hermeneutics in Mircea Eliade's Phenomenology and New Directions, Coming to Terms: Indochina, the United States, and the War, Comparative Philosophy and Religion in Times of Terror, and Gandhi after 9/11: Creative Nonviolence and Sustainability.

Allen is a peace and justice scholar and activist, and has been active in the Civil Rights Movement and the Vietnam/Indochina Antiwar Movement. He served as an Elected President of the International Society for Asian and Comparative Philosophy from 2000 till 2004. He is the Editor of the book series Studies in Comparative Philosophy and Religion published by Lexington Books.

== Education ==
Allen received his Bachelor of Arts in philosophy from Yale University in 1963 before spending a Fulbright year at Banaras Hindu University in India, where he focused on classical Indian philosophy. He then enrolled in Vanderbilt University and received his Master of Arts and Ph.D. in philosophy in 1967 and 1971, respectively. He also propounded the famous theory of "contract to status".

== Career ==
Allen joined Southern Illinois University as an instructor and assistant professor till 1972 and later taught for a year at Central Connecticut State as an assistant professor. In 1974, he joined the University of Maine and held appointments as assistant professor and associate professor before being promoted to professor in 1981. In 2020, he was appointed as professor emeritus of philosophy at the University of Maine. At University of Maine, he has been twice appointed as a chairperson of philosophy.

On October 2, 2017, Allen delivered a keynote address to the General Assembly of the United Nations on the UN International Day of Nonviolence on “Mahatma Gandhi on Violence and Nonviolence.

== Research ==
Allen specializes in the philosophy of Mahatma Gandhi, philosophical phenomenology and the phenomenology of religion, symbolism, and myth, the phenomenology of Mircea Eliade, Marx, Marxism, and political philosophy, and comparative East-West philosophy, along with Eastern philosophy and religion with special emphasis on Hinduism and Buddhism.

=== Philosophy of Gandhi ===
Allen has conducted research on various peace and justice topics, focusing on the philosophy of Mahatma Gandhi. His work on Gandhi's philosophy includes research on violence and nonviolence, war and peace, terrorism, truth, Vedanta, Hind Swaraj and the Bhagavad-Gita, marginality, technology, and economic and environmental sustainability.

Allen studied Gandhi’s peace education and his formulations regarding violence, including educational violence, and the violence of the status quo. He discussed the major key points of Gandhi’s peace education and regarded long-term preventative education and socialization as its greatest strength. In the late 2010s, he authored a paper titled, "Mahatma Gandhi’s Philosophy of Nonviolence and Truth" and presented an overview of Gandhi’s philosophy in the context of truth and nonviolence. He presented an alternative to anti-Gandhians, non-Gandhians, or reactionary Gandhians who over-idealized and decontextualize Gandhi and his philosophy.

Allen has authored and edited five Gandhi-informed books, including The Philosophy of Mahatma Gandhi for the Twenty-First Century, Mahatma Gandhi, and Gandhi after 9/11: Creative Nonviolence and Sustainability. His book, The Philosophy of Mahatma Gandhi for the Twenty-First Century was published in 2008. According to Neelmani Jaysawal, "Gandhi’s philosophy has been presented in a number of contexts ranging from his ideas on religion, violence and satyagraha to his conception of a new society".

In 2019, Allen published Gandhi after 9/11: Creative Nonviolence and Sustainability, which was reviewed as a "fascinating read" that "brings together effectively for the reader how a Gandhi-informed, non-violent response is creative, sustainable and relevant today." The review also stated that "this outstanding collection will be valuable to Gandhian scholars, students and activists".

=== Phenomenology of Mircea Eliade ===
Allen has conducted extensive work on phenomenology of religion, focusing especially on the phenomenology of Mircea Eliade. He studied Eliade's phenomenological analysis of religious experience and discussed Eliade's interpretations regarding the dialectic of the sacred and profane along with the role of symbolism. He highlighted various principles from Eliade's methodology and presented the relationship between the sacred and the profane, and the evaluation and choice implied in the dialectic.

Allen authored a paper on Eliade's critique of contemporary Western philosophy and culture, and presented his analysis of engaged self-other Marxist, feminist, Hindu and Buddhist encounters. In early 2010s, Allen published a paper on various aspects of Eliade's life and his scholarship, and reviewed and evaluated the interpretations made by Eliade's defenders regarding his work.

== Awards and honors ==
- 1963–1964 – Fulbright Grant to India
- 1964–1967 – NDEA Fellowship to Vanderbilt University
- 1985, 1992 – Smithsonian Institution Fellowship in India
- 1986 – Selected as Honorary Visiting Professor, University of Peradeniya, Sri Lanka
- 1998 – Presidential Research and Creative Achievement Award, University of Maine
- 2000 – Distinguished Maine Professor Award, University of Maine
- 2005 – Hands of Peace Award, Peace and Justice Center of Eastern Maine
- 2006 – Scroll of Peace International Award for Peace Research, presented at the International Peace Research Conference in India
- 2007 – Elected member, International Peace Research Association Foundation Board
- 2016 – First Honorary Distinguished Visiting Scholar of Gandhian Studies, Indian Institute of Technology
- 2017 – Faculty Excellence Award, University of Maine Alumni Association
- 2020 – Steve Gould Award, University of Maine

== Bibliography ==
=== Selected books ===
- Structure and Creativity in Religion: Hermeneutics in Mircea Eliade’s Phenomenology and New Directions (1978) ISBN 9789027975942
- Religion and Political Conflict in South Asia: India, Pakistan, and Sri Lanka (1992) ISBN 9780313273094
- Culture and Self: Philosophical and Religious Perspectives, East and West (1997) ISBN 978-0813326740
- Myth and Religion in Mircea Eliade (2002) ISBN 9780415939393
- The Philosophy of Mahatma Gandhi for the Twenty-First Century (2008) ISBN 9780739122242
- Mahatma Gandhi (2011) ISBN 9781861899705
- Gandhi after 9/11: Creative Nonviolence and Sustainability (2018) ISBN 9780199097098

=== Selected articles ===
- Allen, D. (1997). Social Constructions of Self: Some Asian, Marxist, and Feminist Critiques of Dominant Western Views of Self. Culture and Self: Philosophical and Religious Perspectives, East and West, 3-26.
- Allen, D. (2013). Eliade’s Phenomenological Approach to Religion and Myth. Mircea Eliade: Myth, Religion, and History, 85-112.
- Allen, D. (2015). Traditional Philosophies and Gandhi’s Approach to the Self in Pain. Cultural Ontology of the Self in Pain, 111-31.
- Allen, D. (2019). Mahatma Gandhi’s Philosophy of Nonviolence and Truth: The Key Values and Concepts for Gandhi 150 and the Future. The Acorn: Philosophical Studies in Pacifism and Nonviolence, 1-14.
- Allen, D. (2020). Philosophies of Becoming: Mythic Constructions, the Buddha’s Philosophy, and Gandhi’s Philosophy. The Time is Now: Essays on the Philosophy of Becoming, 23-61.
