= Nicholas Allen =

Nicholas Allen may refer to:

- Nicholas Allen (anthropologist) (1939–2020), English anthropologist
- Nicholas Allen (theatre director) (born 1947), British theatre director
- Nick Allen (catcher) (1888–1939), American baseball catcher
- Nick Allen (infielder) (born 1998), American baseball infielder
- Nicky Allen (1958–1984), New Zealand rugby union player
- Nick Allen (politician) (born 1990), American politician
