= Kevin Allen (defensive back) =

American gridiron football player (born 1972)

Profile
- Position: Defensive back

Personal information
- Born: May 14, 1972 (age 54)
- Listed height: 5 ft 10 in (1.78 m)
- Listed weight: 170 lb (77 kg)

Career information
- High school: Granby (Norfolk, Virginia)
- College: Virginia State

Career history
- Calgary Stampeders (1995); New Jersey Red Dogs (1997); Iowa Barnstormers (1998)

Career AFL statistics
- Tackles: 10
- Pass breakups: 2
- Receptions: 2
- Receiving yards: 19
- Receiving TDs: 1
- Stats at ArenaFan.com

Kevin Allen Jr. (born May 14, 1972) is a former gridiron football defensive back for the Calgary Stampeders of the Canadian Football League. He played four games with the Stampeders in 1995, recording five tackles. He also played arena football for the New Jersey Red Dogs and the Iowa Barnstormers of the Arena Football League. Allen attended Virginia State University, where he played college football for the Virginia State Trojans.
