= Ernest Allen (cricketer) =

English cricketer

Ernest Allen (24 June 1880 – 28 May 1943) was an English first-class cricketer. He was a right-handed batsman who played for Nottinghamshire. He was born in Holme and died in Harrogate.

Allen's debut came against the Gentlemen of Philadelphia during a two-month-long English tour by the team. Allen made a steady first-innings total, and backed this up in the second innings, though others near him in the batting order tended to outscore him – including England Test cricketer John Gunn.

Allen's second and final first-class appearance came against Essex in the County Championship two months later. Allen scored steadily in an innings victory, though he was dropped from the team following this game.
