= Marcus Allen (disambiguation) =

Marcus Allen (born 1960) is an American former football running back.

Marcus Allen may also refer to:

- Marcus Allen (linebacker) (born 1996), American football player
- Marcus Allen (hurdler) (born 1961), American hurdler, 1982 All-American for the UCLA Bruins track and field team
- Timothy J. Boham (born 1981), adult-film star who uses the stage name Marcus Allen

== See also ==
- Marcus Allan (born 1986), Australian rules footballer
- Mark Allen (disambiguation)
