= Samuel Doyle Allen =

American politician

Member of the Georgia House of Representatives from the 108th district
- In office January 8, 1973 – January 13, 1975
- Preceded by: William H. Alexander
- Succeeded by: Wilbur E. Baugh

Member of the Georgia House of Representatives from the 92nd district
- In office January 1971 – January 8, 1973
- Preceded by: Arthur Joseph Funk
- Succeeded by: Hines L. Brantley

Personal details
- Born: Samuel Doyle Allen; January 11, 1921 Boydell, Arkansas, U.S.
- Died: July 10, 2006 (aged 85) Savannah, Georgia, U.S.
- Party: Democratic
- Spouse: Evelyn
- Children: 4
- Education: Georgia Institute of Technology (BS)

Samuel Doyle Allen (January 11, 1921 – July 10, 2006) was an American politician who served two terms in the Georgia House of Representatives. He won his first election to the State House in 1970 in the 92nd district. In 1972, he won reelection in the 108th district. In 1974, he lost his bid for renomination in the 125th district to Tom Taggart.

Allen is an alumnus of Georgia Tech. He married his wife Evelyn in 1941 and had four children. Allen died in 2006.

Georgia House of Representatives
Preceded by Arthur Joseph Funk	Member of the Georgia House of Representatives from the 92nd district 1971–1973	Succeeded by Hines L. Brantley
Preceded by William H. Alexander	Member of the Georgia House of Representatives from the 108th district 1973–1975	Succeeded by Wilbur E. Baugh
