= Tom Allen (painter) =

American painter (born 1975)

- Born: 1975 (age 50–51); Springfield, Massachusetts, U.S.
- Education: University of Southern California (BFA); Art Center College of Design (MFA)
- Known for: Painting
- Movement: Contemporary art

Tom Allen (born 1975, Springfield, Massachusetts) is an American painter based in Los Angeles. His work combines elements of symbolism, mysticism, and popular culture, drawing on sources ranging from fin-de-siècle art and literature to countercultural iconography and contemporary music. Allen is best known for his vividly colored, small-scale figurative paintings of flora, which merge art historical reference with psychological and psychedelic intensity.

== Early life and education ==
Allen was born in Springfield, Massachusetts, in 1975. He studied at the University of Southern California, where he earned his BFA in 1998, and later received an MFA from the Art Center College of Design, Pasadena, in 2001.

== Work ==
Allen's paintings often depict stylized flowers and plants that are saturated with symbolic and atmospheric detail. Critics have noted their affinities with French fin-de-siècle painting and literature, particularly artists such as Édouard Vuillard and Gustave Moreau, as well as Art Nouveau design. His imagery also engages with astrology, mysticism, and post-1960s countercultural aesthetics.

Writing in Artillery, critic Ezrha Jean Black described Allen's floral imagery as “taking still life out of allegory” through a palette that hovers “between the psychological and the psychedelic.” His work has been compared to both Flemish still life traditions and the visionary qualities of countercultural art.

== Exhibitions ==
=== Selected solo exhibitions ===
- 2025: Personae, Air de Paris, Paris, FR
- 2023: The Hour, The Approach, London, UK
- 2021: The Song, Chris Sharp Gallery, Los Angeles, CA; The Promise, The Approach, London, UK
- 2020: Præternatura, Air de Paris, Paris, FR
- 2019: Là-bas, Lulu, Mexico City, MX
- 2017: The Lovers, Bel Ami, Los Angeles, CA
- 2010: Summerlands, Richard Telles Fine Art, Los Angeles, CA
- 2008: The Red in the Sky is Ours, Richard Telles Fine Art, Los Angeles, CA; Galerie Michael Janssen, Berlin, DE
- 2006: Richard Telles Fine Art, Los Angeles, CA
- 2005: Galerie Michael Janssen, Cologne, DE
- 2002: Richard Telles Fine Art, Los Angeles, CA

=== Selected group exhibitions ===
- 2025: JUST MORE, Air de Paris, Monte Carlo, MC; MORE JUST, Air de Paris, Paris, FR; Random Access Memory, Air de Paris, Paris, FR; Art Gstaad, Air de Paris, Paris, CH
- 2024: Trespass sweetly urged, Tanya Leighton, Berlin, DE
- 2023: Immersed, Jack Siebert Projects, Los Angeles, CA; Imperfect Paradise, Barbati Gallery, Venice, IT
- 2022: A Minor Constellation, Chris Sharp Gallery, Los Angeles, CA
- 2021: Particularities, X Museum, Beijing, CN
- 2017: Symbolisms, Cooper Cole, Toronto, CA; Therianthropy, Laura Bartlett Gallery, London, UK; Ruins in the Snow, High Art, Paris, FR
- 2016: A Change of Heart, Hannah Hoffman Gallery, Los Angeles, CA
- 2012: Landscape & Architecture, Irvine Fine Arts Center, Irvine, CA
- 2004: Now Is a Good Time, Andrea Rosen Gallery, New York, NY
- 2002: crisp, Marianne Boesky Gallery, New York, NY
- 2001: Morbid Curiosity, Acme, Los Angeles, CA

== Collections ==
Allen's work is included in the collections of the Museum of Contemporary Art, Los Angeles, and the Sweeney Gallery, University of California, Riverside.

== Selected press ==
- Christina Catherine Martinez, “Stars Aligning: When Art Meets Astrology,” Art Basel, August 7, 2023
- Ezrha Jean Black, “Ten More to Remember – or Simply Bring to Los Angeles,” Artillery, February 10, 2022
- “Tom Allen’s Otherworldly Flowers Bloom at Lulu in Mexico City,” ARTnews, November 18, 2019
- Christina Catherine Martinez, “Tom Allen,” Artforum, October 1, 2019
- “Tom Allen ‘LÀ-Bas’ at Lulu, Mexico City,” Mousse Magazine, July 25, 2019
- Leah Ollman, “Art Review: Tom Allen at Richard Telles,” Los Angeles Times, November 11, 2010
- Christopher Knight, “45 Painters Under 45,” Los Angeles Times, December 2, 2007
- Ken Johnson, “Art in Review,” The New York Times, April 19, 2002
