= Raymond Allen =

Raymond Allen may refer to:

- Raymond Allen (television actor) (1929–2020), best known for his recurring roles on Good Times and Sanford and Son
- Raymond Allen (stage actor) (1921–1994), who appeared in light opera from the 1950s through the 1980s
- Raymond Allen (scriptwriter) (1940–2022), who wrote the 1970s BBC comedy series Some Mothers Do 'Ave 'Em
- Raymond B. Allen (1902–1986), American educator

== See also ==
- Ray Allen (disambiguation)
