= Francis Allen (engraver) =

German engraver

Francis Allen (fl. 1652) was a German engraver who executed the frontispiece to the book Dialogus D. Urbani Regi (or Regii?), dated Lübeck, 1652.
