= Andrew Hussey Allen =

American archivist and author

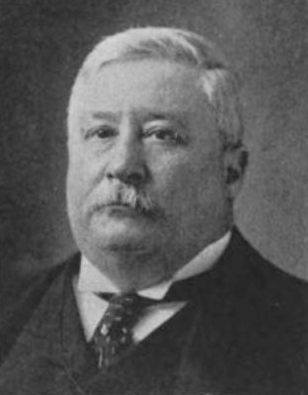
- Born: December 6, 1855; New York, New York
- Died: November 15, 1921 (aged 65); Washington, D.C.
- Education: Harvard University
- Occupations: Archivist, writer

Andrew Hussey Allen (December 6, 1855 – November 15, 1921) was an American archivist and author.

== Biography ==
Andrew Hussey Allen born in New York City on December 6, 1855, the son of Colonel Julian Allen, né Alschwang, and Mary Abby Hussey. He attended Phillips Academy, Andover (Class of 1874) and graduated from Harvard University in 1878. He studied law, and although admitted to the bar, he never engaged in practice. He worked for the United States Department of State for many years, beginning in 1880. In 1893 he was inaugurated as the Chief of the Bulletin of Rolls and Library, becoming the medium for the publication of catalogues, indexes, and important papers of the national archives.

He died in Washington, D.C., on November 15, 1921. Effects from his estate were put up for auction by C.G. Sloan & Co. of Washington, D.C. in 1922.

== Bibliography ==
- Official Relations of the United States with the Hawaiian Islands from the First Appointment of a Consular Office there by the United States Government (1893)
- Method of Recognition of Foreign Governments and Foreign States by the Government of the United States (1897)
