= Leslie Allen (cricketer) =

Australian cricketer (born 1954)

Personal information
- Born: 13 September 1954 (age 72); Wynyard, Tasmania, Australia

Domestic team information
- Years: Team
- 1980-1984: Tasmania
- Source: Cricinfo, 15 March 2016

Leslie Allen (born 13 September 1954) is an Australian former cricketer. He played seven first-class matches for Tasmania between 1980 and 1984.

== See also ==
- List of Tasmanian representative cricketers
