= Doug Allen =

Doug Allen may refer to:

- Doug Allen (cartoonist) (born 1956), American cartoonist
- Doug Allen (American football) (born 1951), American football player
- Doug Allen (actor), British actor

== See also ==
- Doug Allan (1951–2026), Scottish wildlife cameraman and photographer
- Douglas Allen (disambiguation)
