= Fred Allen (cricketer) =

English cricketer

Personal information
- Full name: Frederick Esmond Allen
- Born: 28 July 1935 (age 91); Carshalton, Surrey
- Batting: Right handed
- Bowling: Right-arm off break

Domestic team information
- Years: Team
- 1960–1970: Durham

Career statistics
Competition	List A
Matches	1
Runs scored	2
Batting average	2.00
100s/50s	0/0
Top score	2
Catches/stumpings	0/–
- Source: CricketArchive, 5 August 2008

Frederick Esmond Allen (born 28 July 1935) is a former English cricketer who played for Durham County Cricket Club. Having made his recorded Minor Counties Championship debut in 1960, he played one further match before taking a break from 1962, in which he played no Minor Counties matches, to 1965. A top order batsman, he made his name as a number 3 batsman and occasional off spin bowler.

Durham were only awarded first-class status in 1991. Prior to this they played as a "Minor County" against several of the first-class counties' Second XI. Allen's greatest bowling performance was in his third Minor County match, against Warwickshire Second XI taking seven wickets for 53 runs. This was not enough to win the match, as Durham were unable to match Warwickshire's 223, losing the match by an innings and 23 runs. Allen was a regular in the side from 1965 to 1968 and made his sole List A appearance in 1968, playing in the first round of the Gillette Cup, scoring two runs before being bowled out by seven-time Test cricketer Len Coldwell, in his penultimate year before retiring from first-class cricket.

Allen took part in a single-innings match between Durham and the US, at Ashbrooke, in which he scored 48 runs. The following week, Allen hit his only century, 123 runs, nearly double his second-best score, against Cumberland in August 1968. Between 1968 and 1970, Allen continued to play Minor Counties cricket, before retiring at the end of the 1970 season.
