= Percy Stafford Allen =

British classical scholar (1869–1933)

Percy Stafford Allen FBA
- Portrait by Walter Stoneman, 1923
- Born: 7 July 1869; Twickenham, Middlesex, England
- Died: 16 June 1933 (aged 63)
- Spouse: Helen Mary Allen (m. 1898)

Academic background
- Education: Clifton College; Corpus Christi College, Oxford (BA, MA)
- Academic advisor: James Anthony Froude

Academic work
- Institutions: University of Oxford
- Main interests: Erasmus of Rotterdam

Percy Stafford Allen FBA (7 July 1869 – 16 June 1933) was a British classical scholar, best known for his writings on Desiderius Erasmus.

== Life ==
Percy Stafford Allen was born on 7 July 1869 in Twickenham, Middlesex, England. He was a son of Joseph Allen (1825–1901) and Mary Mason Satow (1842–1892). He received his early education in Rottingdean. From 1882, he studied Latin and Greek at Clifton College and after 1888 at Corpus Christi College, Oxford. One of his Oxford tutors was the historian and biographer James Anthony Froude. In 1892 he received his BA, and his MA in 1896.

From 1897 to 1901 he taught history at Government College in Lahore, British India (modern Pakistan). He returned to Oxford in 1908 as a Fellow of Merton College, Oxford. From 1924 to 1933 he was president of Corpus Christi College. In 1925 he delivered the British Academy's Master-Mind Lecture, on "Erasmus' Services to Learning". In 1928 he became a foreign member of the Royal Netherlands Academy of Arts and Sciences.

Letter (1922)

He was married in 1898 to Helen Mary Allen (1872–1952), daughter of Arthur John Allen and Margaret Agneta Satow. She made significant contributions to their scholarly collaborations, and was acknowledged through several honours: she received honorary doctorates from the University of Basel (1946) and the University of Amsterdam (1948), as well as an honorary MA degree from Oxford (1932). Mrs Allen was elected an honorary fellow of St Hilda's College, Oxford, in 1944.

Allen is best known as the editor of the complete letters of Erasmus of Rotterdam, a twelve-volume work. Among other writings, he also published The Age of Erasmus: Lectures delivered in the University of Oxford and London (1914) and Letters of Richard Fox, 1486–1527 (1929).

== Writings ==
- The age of Erasmus. Lectures delivered in the University of Oxford and London, Oxford, 1914.
- Letters of Richard Fox 1486–1527, Oxford 1929. (joint editor, with H. M. Allen)
- Erasmus. Lectures and wayfaring sketches, Oxford, 1934.
- Opus epistolarum Des. Erasmi Roterodami : denuo recognitum et auctum, Percy Stafford Allen, Helen Mary Allen and Heathcote William Garrod. Compendium vitae P.S. Allen addidit H.W. Garrod. Indices (T. XII) compilavit Barbara Flower; perfecit et edidit Elisabeth Rosenbaum, Oxford, éd. Clarendon, 1906–1958, 12 vol. in 8°:
  - Vol. I: 1484–1514, XXIV + 615 p. (1906)
  - Vol. II: 1514–1517, XX + 603 p. (1910)
  - Vol. III: 1517–1519, XXXI + 634 p. (1913)
  - Vol. IV: 1519–1521, XXXII + 632 p. (1922)
  - Vol. V: 1522–1524, XXIII + 631 p. (1924)
  - Vol. VI: 1525–1527, XXV + 518 p. (1926)
  - Vol. VII: 1527–1528, XXIII + 558 p. (1928)
  - Vol. VIII: 1529–1530, XLIV + 515 p. (1934)
  - Vol. IX: 1530–1532, XXIII + 497 p. (1938)
  - Vol. X: 1532–1534, XXIV + 440 p. (1941)
  - Vol. XI: 1534–1536, XXVII + 400 p. (1947)

== Collection ==
Allen's collection comprising original editions of Erasmus' works and a comprehensive working library of around 2,000 items relating to Erasmus, which was built up by Allens while editing the Opus epistolarum, were donated to the Bodleian Library in 1952 by Mrs Allen in accordance with the wishes of her husband. The collection spans a wide range of places of publication and time periods, dating from the 16th-20th centuries, and includes a collection of offprints and pamphlets.
