= Ruth Allen (economist) =

American economist (1889–1979)

Ruth Alice Allen
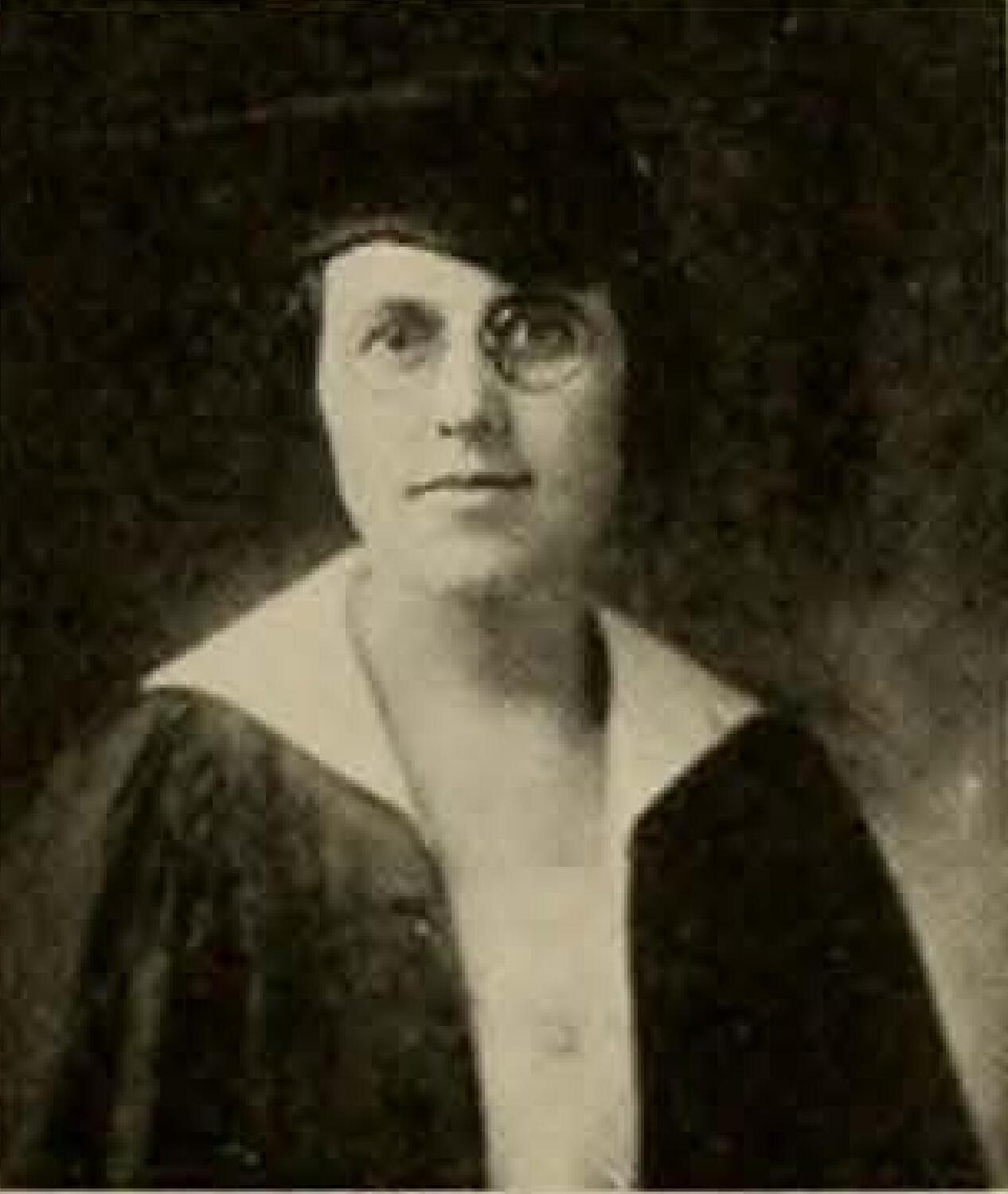
- Born: July 28, 1889; Cameron, Texas, United States
- Died: October 7, 1979 (aged 90); Austin, Texas

Academic background
- Education: University of Texas at Austin (B.A., M.A.); University of Chicago ( Ph.D.)
- Doctoral advisor: Harry A. Millis

Academic work
- Discipline: Institutional economics
- Institutions: University of Texas at Austin

Ruth Alice Allen (July 28, 1889, Cameron, Texas - October 7, 1979, Austin, Texas) was an American economist and academic who specialized in institutional economics.

== Personal life and education ==
Allen was born on July 28, 1889, in Cameron, Texas,. After graduating high school, she passed the teacher certification exam and taught for several years after. Allen then attended summer school in 1914 at Baylor University and Southwest Texas University, and received her permanent teaching diploma. She earned her B.A. degree from the University of Texas at Austin in 1921 and her M.A. from the same university two years later. She received her Ph.D. from the University of Chicago in 1931. Her doctoral advisor was Harry A. Millis and her dissertation committee included Frank Knight and Paul Douglas. This dissertation focused on women working in the Texas cotton industry, which was one of the earliest detailed studies of female labor in Texas agriculture and emphasized the challenges they faced in the workforce.

== Career ==
Allen returned to University of Texas for the rest of her career, briefly serving as chair of the department of economics (1942–43), but spending most of the next two decades as the department's graduate advisor until her retirement in 1959. After retiring for the first time, she spent six years at Huston–Tillotson College to preserve its accreditation before retiring again in 1968.

During Allen's time as a professor, she frequently spoke out in support of academic freedom and brought attention to the history of working people in Texas. This was evident in her most important works, The Labor of Women in the Production of Cotton, OCLC 1174485, a revision of her 1933 dissertation, and East Texas Lumber Workers (1961), OCLC 234567, were fact-based socioeconomic surveys of those Texas industries through the lens of institutional economics. Allen designed the questionnaires herself and personally conducted most of the interviews.
