= Ray Allen (disambiguation) =

Ray Allen (born 1975) is an American former professional basketball player.

Ray Allen may also refer to:

- Ray Allen (cricketer) (1908–1979), New Zealand cricketer
- Ray Allen or R. S. Allen (1924–1981), American television writer and producer

== See also ==
- Ray Allan (born 1955), Scottish footballer
- Ray Alan (1930–2010), English ventriloquist
- Rae Allen (1926–2022), American actress and singer
- Raymond Allen (disambiguation)
