= Reginald Allen (English cricketer) =

English cricketer

Personal information
- Full name: William Reginald Allen
- Born: 14 April 1893; Sharlston, Wakefield, Yorkshire, England
- Died: 14 October 1950 (aged 57); Normanton, Yorkshire, England
- Batting: Right-handed

Domestic team information
- Years: Team
- 1921: Yorkshire

Career statistics
Competition	First-class
Matches	30
Runs scored	475
Batting average	21.59
100s/50s	0/1
Top score	95*
Catches/stumpings	45/21
- Source: CricketArchive, 5 August 2008

William Reginald Allen (14 April 1893 – 14 October 1950) is an English first-class cricketer, who played for Yorkshire County Cricket Club between 1921 and 1925. All of his first-class games were for Yorkshire. Allen also played in 43 Minor Counties Cricket Championship matches for Yorkshire Second XI.

A huge man with hands to match, he was a capable wicket-keeper and hard-hitting batsman who was reserve to Arthur Dolphin, and was considered the favourite to take over from that player in 1928. However, Arthur Wood was preferred, so Allen continued to play in League cricket, mainly with Castleford Cricket Club for whom he first appeared in 1919.

A Coal Board clerk at Whitwood, he was a prolific run-scorer in League cricket and led Castleford to the Yorkshire Council Championship in 1935.
