= Percival Allen =

British geologist

Percival Allen FRS (15 March 1917 – 3 April 2008) was a British geologist. He was Professor and Head of Department at Reading from 1952 and became an Emeritus Professor on his retirement in 1982. He was awarded an honorary DSc in 1992.

== Education ==
He attended Rye Grammar School.

== British Sedimentological Research Group ==
Allen organised the founding meeting of the British Sedimentological Research Group held in Reading on 16–17 November 1962, to celebrate the opening of that university’s new Sedimentology Research Laboratory.

== Honours ==
In March 1973, he was elected a Fellow of the Royal Society. His application citation read: "Distinguished for his investigations of Lower Cretaceous sedimentation in north-western Europe. His reconstructions of Wealden palaeography and depositional environments have been based on meticulous examination and analysis of faecies changes, sedimentary structures and petrology combined with a study of modern deltaic and littoral sedimentation. He has stimulated much research along similar lines in other formations, notably the Torridonian. He was a pioneer in the application of statistical methods to sedimentary models. At Reading he has built up an outstanding school of sedimentology."

The Percival Allen Medal Award was established in 2006 by the Association of European Geological Societies Executive Committee and is awarded biennially to a geoscientist for outstanding achievements in the field of international relations in Earth Science.
