= Ernie Allen =

American attorney (born 1946)

Ernie Allen OBE
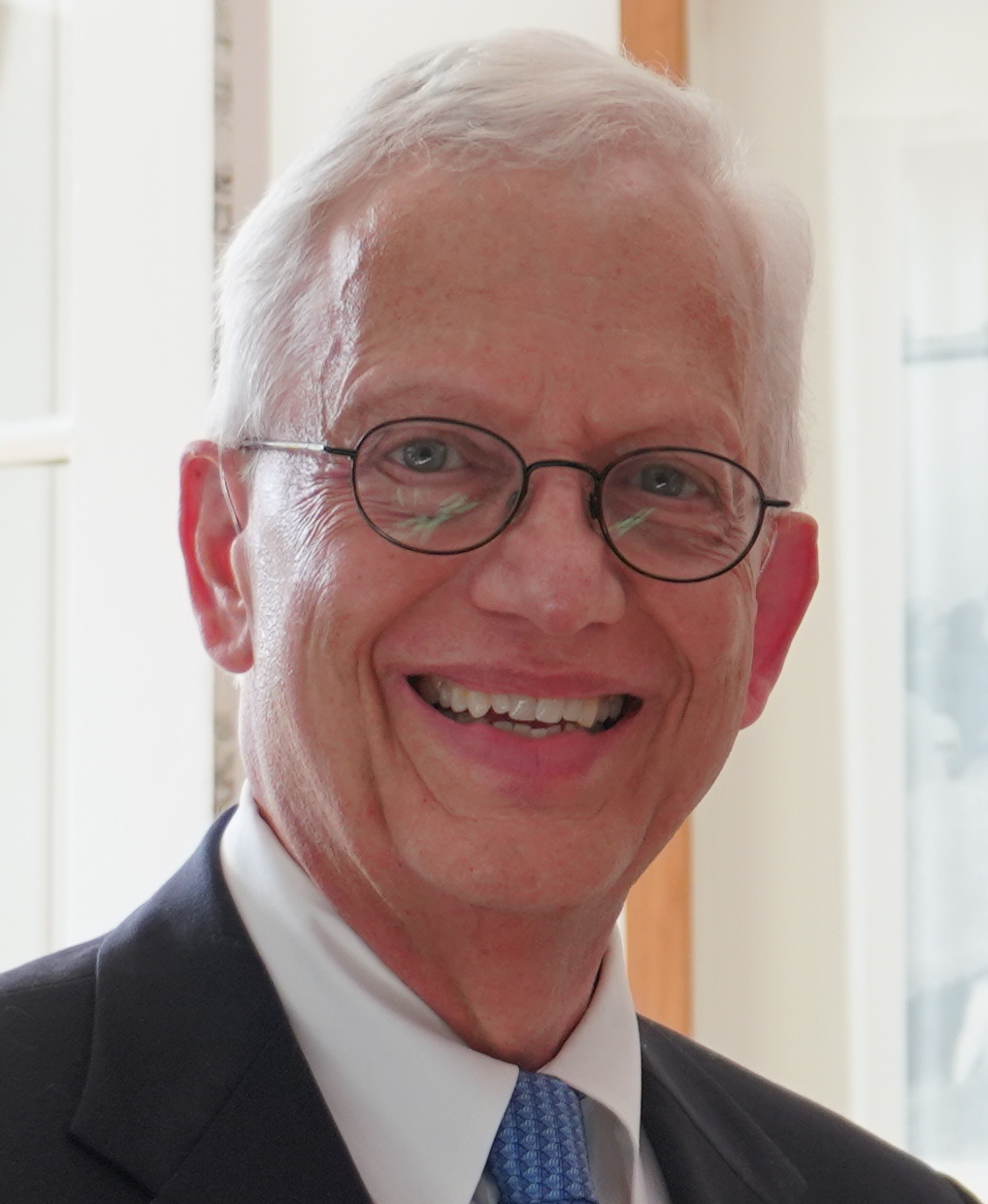
- Ernie Allen in 2022
- Born: 1946 (age 79–80)
- Education: University of Louisville
- Occupation: Attorney
- Awards: Order of the British Empire (2021)

Ernie Allen (born 1946) is an American attorney who served as the president and CEO of the National Center for Missing & Exploited Children (NCMEC) for 23 years until June 2012, and the International Centre for Missing & Exploited Children (ICMEC) until 2014.

Allen is also a former director of public health and safety for the City of Louisville, Kentucky.

== Biography ==
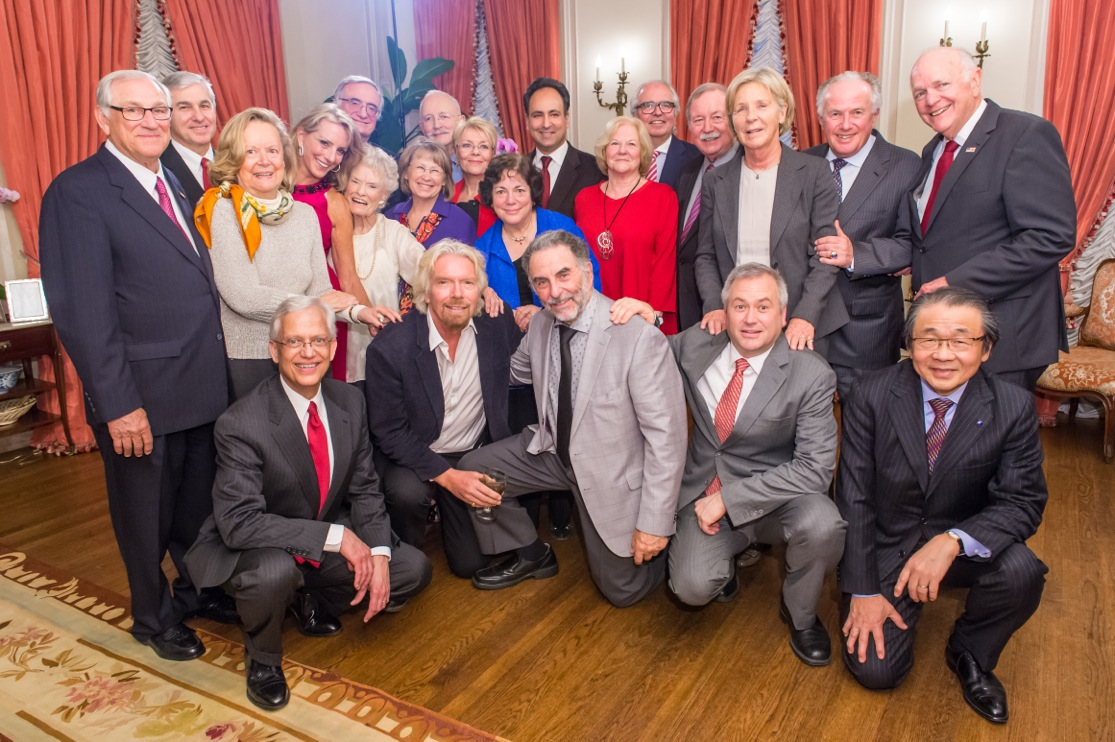
Allen with the board of directors of the International Centre for Missing & Exploited Children

He is a graduate of the University of Louisville where he became a member of Phi Kappa Tau fraternity. Allen received his Juris Doctor from the University of Louisville in 1972 and passed the Kentucky bar exam that same year.

From 1973 to 1983 he was the director of the Louisville Crime Commission and from 1983 to 1985 he was director of safety for Louisville. From 1985 to 1989 he was the chief administrative officer for Jefferson County, Kentucky.

Allen served as president and CEO of both NCMEC and the International Centre for Missing & Exploited Children (ICMEC) for 15 years. Allen retired from NCMEC in 2012, and in 2014 announced his retirement from ICMEC as well.

Allen is a member of the advisory board for WeProtect which is a global non-profit cooperation with the goal to protect children online and stop the crime of online child sexual abuse and exploitation.

In June 2021, he was appointed Honorary Officer of the Order of the British Empire (OBE), for services to the protection of children in the UK.

== Quotes ==
To parents, "our basic message is get that [personal computer] out of the bedroom and put it in a public place and set some limits and know what your kids are doing."
