= Steven Allan =

Australian rules footballer

Personal information
- Full name: Steven Allan
- Born: 22 September 1956 (age 70)
- Original team: Golden Point
- Height: 180 cm (5 ft 11 in)
- Weight: 76 kg (168 lb)

Playing career^{1}
| Years | Club | Games (Goals) |
| 1982 | St Kilda | 9 (2) |
- ^{1} Playing statistics correct to the end of 1982.

Steven Allan (born 22 September 1956) is a former Australian rules footballer who played with St Kilda in the Victorian Football League (VFL).
