= Oscar Dana Allen =

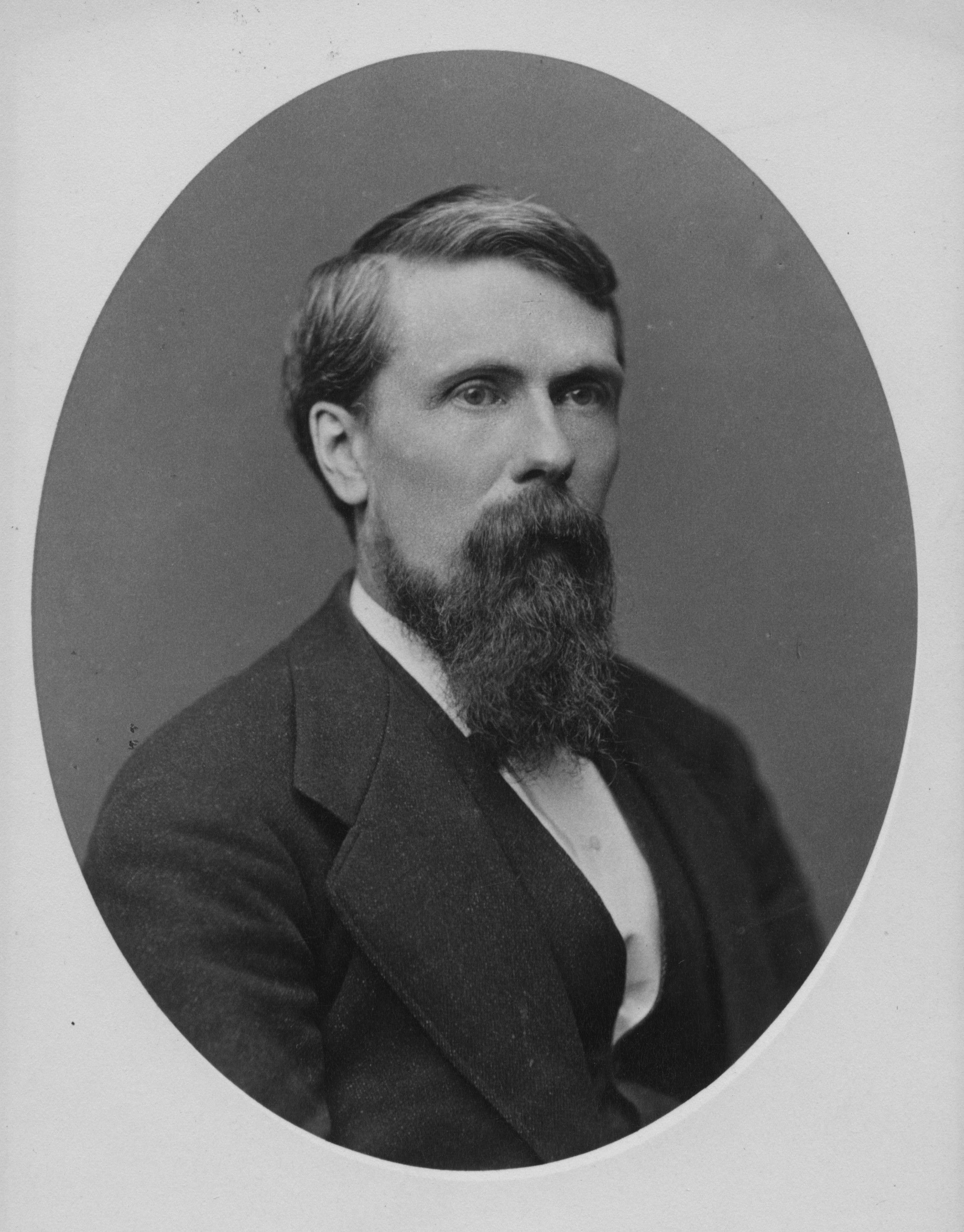
- Born: February 25, 1836; Hebron
- Died: February 19, 1913 (aged 76); Ashford
- Occupation: Botanist, bryologist, chemist, botanical collector
- Children: John Alpheus Allen

Oscar Dana Allen (February 25, 1836 – February 19, 1913) was a professor of chemistry at Yale University and a prolific researcher and collector of bryophytes.

Oscar Dana Allen was born on February 25, 1836 in Hebron, Maine. He was graduated at Yale's Sheffield Scientific School in 1861, and ten years later he received the degree of doctor of philosophy for original investigations, having in the meantime been an assistant professor there. In 1871 he became professor of metallurgy and assaying, and in 1873 was appointed to the chair of analytical chemistry and metallurgy. Allen's researches have been chiefly on the rare elements caesium and rubidium. These investigations and his other scientific papers have appeared principally in the American Journal of Science. The latest American edition of Fresenius's Quantitative Analysis (New York, 1881) was edited and revised by him. He was a member of numerous scientific societies. Allen edited the exsiccata work Flora of the Cascade Mountains, Washington (c. 1897).

Oscar Dana Allen died on 19 February 1913 in Ashford, Washington.
