= Bert Allen (Australian footballer) =

Australian rules footballer and umpire

Personal information
- Full name: Albert Victor Edward Allen
- Born: 7 May 1887; Fitzroy
- Died: 4 June 1975 (aged 88); Bentleigh
- Original team: Preston

Playing career^{1}
Years	Club	Games (Goals)	
1912	Richmond	2 (3)	

Umpiring career
Years	League	Role	Games
1915	VFL	Boundary umpire	2
- ^{1} Playing statistics correct to the end of 1912.

Albert Victor Edward Allen (7 May 1887 – 4 June 1975) was an Australian rules football player and umpire. He played for Richmond in the Victorian Football League (VFL). For a short period he was appointed to the VFL list of umpires.

== Football career ==
Allen was recruited to Richmond from Preston and made his debut in round 3 versus University. Named at full-forward he snapped the match's first goal and scored another later but the Tigers were defeated by 15 points. The following week Allen played in his second and final VFL match. He kicked one goal and Richmond lost again this time by 26 points.

Richmond made four changes the following week including Allen who did not play for Richmond again.

== Umpiring career ==
In 1915 Allen was briefly appointed to the VFL list of boundary umpires. He made his VFL debut in round 7 earning Heritage Number 100 when he officiated in the South Melbourne versus Melbourne match. He umpired his last VFL match, Carlton versus Richmond the following week.
