= Bert Allen (footballer, born 1883) =

English footballer (1883–1911)

Personal information
- Full name: William Bertram Allen
- Date of birth: 5 July 1879
- Place of birth: Brimfield, England
- Date of death: 1911 (aged 27–28)
- Position: Winger

Senior career*
Years	Team	Apps	(Gls)
1900–1901	Leominster Thistle		
1901–1904	Leominster Juniors		
1904	Leominster Thursday		
1904	Leominster YMCA		
1905–1906	Aston Villa	3	(0)
1906–1907	Chesterfield Town	20	(1)
1907–1908	Tenbury		
1908	Kidderminster Harriers		
1908	Stafford Rangers		
Total		23	(1)
- * Club domestic league appearances and goals

Bert Allen (1883–1911) was an English footballer who played in the Football League for Aston Villa and Chesterfield Town.
