= Harry Julian Allen =

American aeronautical engineer

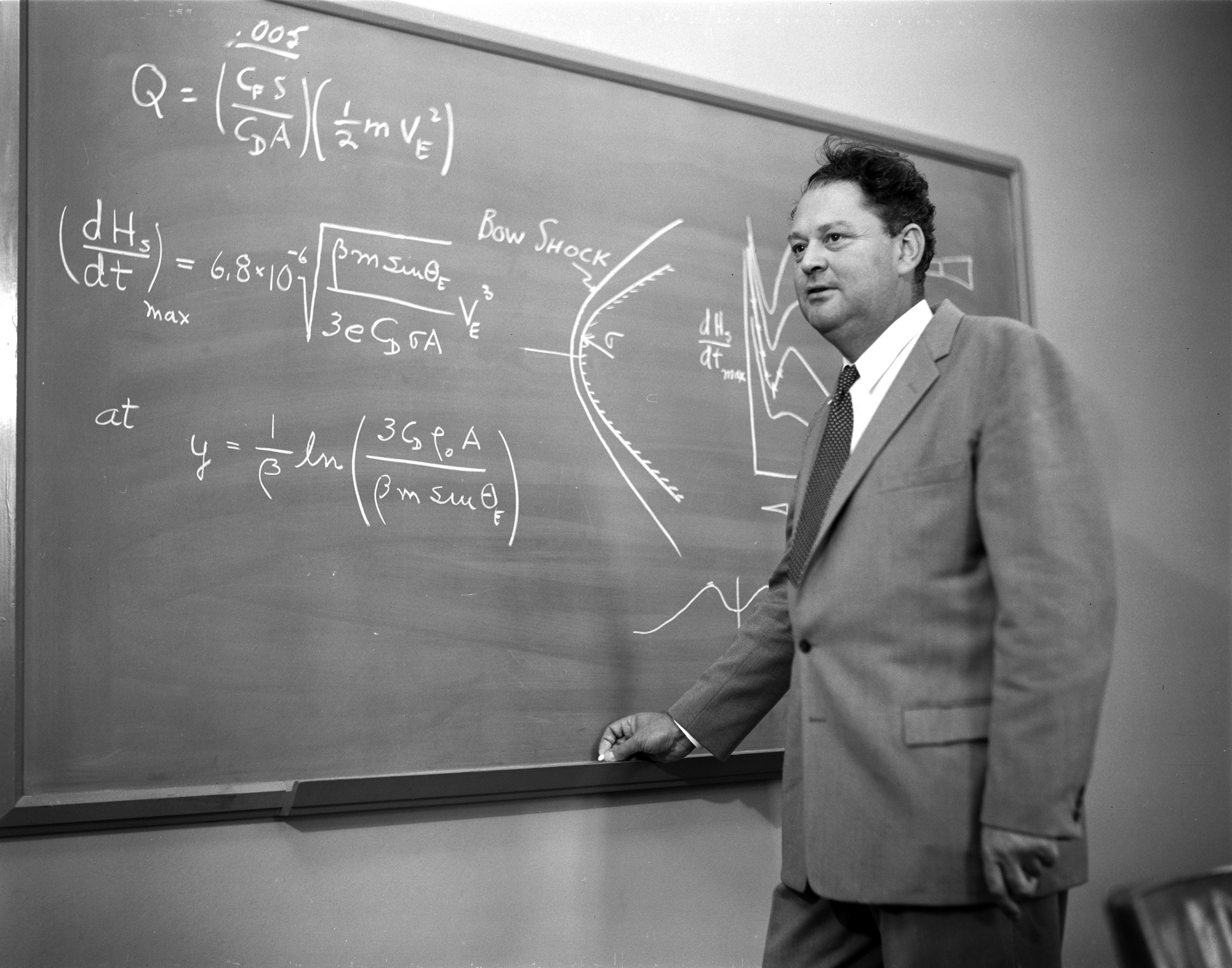
- Born: April 1, 1910; Maywood, Illinois
- Died: January 29, 1977 (aged 66)
- Citizenship: U.S.
- Occupation: Aeronautical engineer
- Years active: 1936-1969
- Employer: Ames Research Center
- Known for: Blunt Body theory

Harry Julian Allen (April 1, 1910 – January 29, 1977), also known as Harvey Allen, was an aeronautical engineer and a Director of the NASA Ames Research Center, most noted for his "Blunt Body" theory of atmospheric entry which permitted successful recovery of orbiting spacecraft. His technique is still used to this day.

== Career ==
Allen was born in Maywood, Illinois on April 1, 1910. He attended Stanford University, receiving a Bachelor of Arts in engineering in 1932 and an Aeronautical Engineer professional degree in 1935. In 1936, he joined the NACA's Langley Memorial Aeronautical Laboratory. In 1940, he moved to the Ames Research Laboratory, where he served as Chief of the Ames Theoretical Aerodynamics Branch (1941-1945), Chief of the High-Speed Research Division (1945-1959), assistant director for Astronautics (1959-1965), and finally Center Director (1965-1969).

== Research ==
Allen was interested in the full range of aerodynamics research, and made contributions to the study of subsonic, transonic, supersonic and hypersonic flow. When the United States became interested in the design of ballistic missiles, Allen began research in the dynamics and thermodynamics of atmospheric reentry, as well as the effects of radiation and meteorites on space vehicles. His most significant contribution in this area was the idea of using a blunt nose for reentry vehicles, otherwise known as his "Blunt Body" theory. Earlier ballistic missiles, developed by both the United States and the Soviet Union, featured long nose cones with very narrow tips, which had relatively low drag when entering the atmosphere at high speeds. However, Allen demonstrated that a blunt body, although it had greater drag, would have a detached shock wave which would transfer far less heat to the vehicle than the traditional shape with its attached shock wave. Excessive heating was the greatest concern in the design of ballistic missiles and spacecraft, since it could melt their surface; the blunt body design solved this problem. Allen's theory led to the design of ablative heat shields that protected the astronauts of the Mercury, Gemini and Apollo programs as their space capsules re-entered the atmosphere.

== Awards and honors ==
- Daniel Guggenheim Medal awarded by AlAA, ASME, and SAE (1969)
- Fellow of the American Institute of Aeronautics and Astronautics (1968)
- Fellow of the Royal Aeronautical Society of Great Britain (1968)
- Fellow of the American Astronautical Society
- Fellow of the Meteoritical Society (ca. 1966)
- Member of the National Academy of Engineering (1966)
- NASA Medal for Exceptional Scientific Achievement (1965)
- Golden Plate Award of the American Academy of Achievement (1962)
- Airpower Trophy of the Air Force Association (1958)
- Distinguished Service Medal of the National Advisory Committee for Aeronautics (NACA) (1957)
- Wright Brothers Lectureship of the Institute of the Aerospace Sciences (1957)
- Sylvanus Albert Reed Award of the Institute of the Aerospace Sciences (predecessor of the AlAA) (1955)
