= Peter Lewis Allen =

American scholar of sexual health history

Peter Lewis Allen (born 1957) is an American executive coach, business executive, and academic. His business work focuses on corporate and individual growth. His academic research includes people management and numerous areas of the humanities.

== Education and career ==
Allen earned a B.A. in classics and English from Haverford College, and a Ph.D. in comparative literature from the University of Chicago. He taught literature for a time at institutions including Princeton University, the University of Southern California, Pomona College, Yale-National University of Singapore College, Nanyang Business School, and Hult International Business School. He went back to earn an M.B.A. from the Wharton School in 2000, at which time he left academia for the business world. He has held positions at McKinsey & Company, at Google University, at Agoda (part of the Booking Holdings online travel group), APL Group, and Aegis Ventures. He is the managing director of Allen Strategies LLC, an executive coaching and HR strategy consulting firm. Allen is also an ICF-certified executive coach and a graduate of the Hudson Institute of Coaching.

== Academic work ==
Allen's research focuses on management, human resources, and culture, history, and sexuality.

Allen has published articles in the McKinsey Quarterly, the MIT-Sloan Management Review, the New York Times, and numerous other publications.

In 2007, Allen donated his collection of safe sex pamphlets to the Fales Library at NYU. This collection contains material relating to sexual health issues from 1974 to 2007.

== Books ==
- Rosenstein, Robert; Allen, Peter Lewis (2018). At Home around the World: The Short-Term Rentals Handbook for Guests, Hosts, Neighbors, and Governments. Agoda Outside.
- Allen, Peter Lewis (June 2002). The Wages of Sin: Sex and Disease, Past and Present. University of Chicago Press. ISBN 978-0-226-01461-6.
- Allen, Peter Lewis (1992). The Art of Love: amatory fiction from Ovid to the Romance of the Rose. University of Pennsylvania Press. ISBN 978-0-8122-3188-5.
