= Sprinkler timer =

A sprinkler timer is an electrical device that is used to set an irrigation sprinkler system to come on automatically at a certain time. Irrigation timers first appeared in the early 1960s to control large-radius lawn sprinklers, which at the time usually contained their own electrically operated valve (most golf-course sprinklers still use this type of actuation). These timers were large and cumbersome with numerous mechanical parts and were usually relegated to agricultural and commercial applications.

Compact irrigation timers did not become commonplace until the 1970s when Lawn Genie introduced a mechanical timer which measured only ten by six inches and was four inches deep. This controller proved popular for many years, but was hard to reprogram and it did not operate valves in immediate succession unless each valve was set to run for an hour.

Rain Bird later introduced the RC-7A to their Rain Clox line, which featured an "at a glance" electromechanical programming interface that proved very easy to operate, and offered the ability to omit stations from the program sequence without creating time gaps. This timer which became standard issue in many tract homes during the 1980s and proved to be remarkably durable in its construction, with many still operating today.

Irrigation control systems almost always use 24-volt alternating current transmitted over two wires, one of which is "common" and connected to all the valves. Other, less-common systems involve fluid-filled hydraulic tubes to open or close the valves.

Many companies followed with similar designs, such as Rainmaster, Griswold Controls, Toro, and Irritrol.

== Development ==
In the late 1980s, the irrigation company Hydro-Rain introduced the first "hybrid" controller design, called the HR-6100, which combined electronic programming with a visual programming interface involving a single selector dial. This overtook the electromechanical timers as the most common design, and today nearly all timers sold are hybrid designs.

The 1990s saw the introduction of computer-controlled "central control" systems, pioneered by Rain Bird for use on golf courses. This system was called "MaxiCom" and worked through a set of "cluster control units", each of which in turn synchronized a number of "satellite" controllers.

As computer-controlled sprinkler timers grew in popularity and usage throughout most sprinkler systems, refinements continued to be made in timers and their functionality.

Starting in the 2010s, timers began to be integrated with a home's network and internet services. These new "smart" timers could be interfaced with on a device such as a smartphone or tablet. Some smart timers omitted any way to interface with the timer directly at all, instead opting for app interfaces. These apps communicated with the smart timers through Bluetooth or WiFi connections.

== See also ==
- Water timer
- Feynman sprinkler
