= Rainbird =

Rainbird, Rain Bird or Rainbirds may refer to:

== Birds ==
- Rainbird, colloquial name given to various birds thought to sing or come before rain, including the European green woodpecker, Jamaican lizard cuckoo, Jacobin cuckoo, Pacific koel, channel-billed cuckoo, Burchell's coucal and black-faced cuckoo-shrike, as well as certain swifts whose movements are thought to signal the coming of rain
- Rain Bird (legend), a Native American legendary animal
- Shangyang (rainbird), in Chinese mythology

== People ==
- Bill Rainbird (1916–1997), New Zealand cricketer
- George Rainbird (1905-1986), British publisher
- Sam Rainbird (born 1992), Australian cricketer
- Victor Noble Rainbird (1887–1936), British painter, stained glass artist and illustrator

== Media ==
- Rainbirds, 1980s German band centred on singer Katharina Franck
- "Rainbirds", instrumental closing song from Tom Waits' 1983 album Swordfishtrombones
- The Rainbird Pattern, 1972 novel by Victor Canning
- "Rain Bird", 1980s song by Love and Rockets
- The Rainbirds, 1968 novel by Janet Frame
- " Rainbird ", song by Code Kunst, featuring Colde and Tablo

== Other ==
- Rainbird (software company), software label owned by Telecomsoft and Microprose
- Rain Bird, irrigation supplies manufacturer
- Rainbird (horse)
