= Thunderbird (mythology) =

Legendary Indigenous North American creature

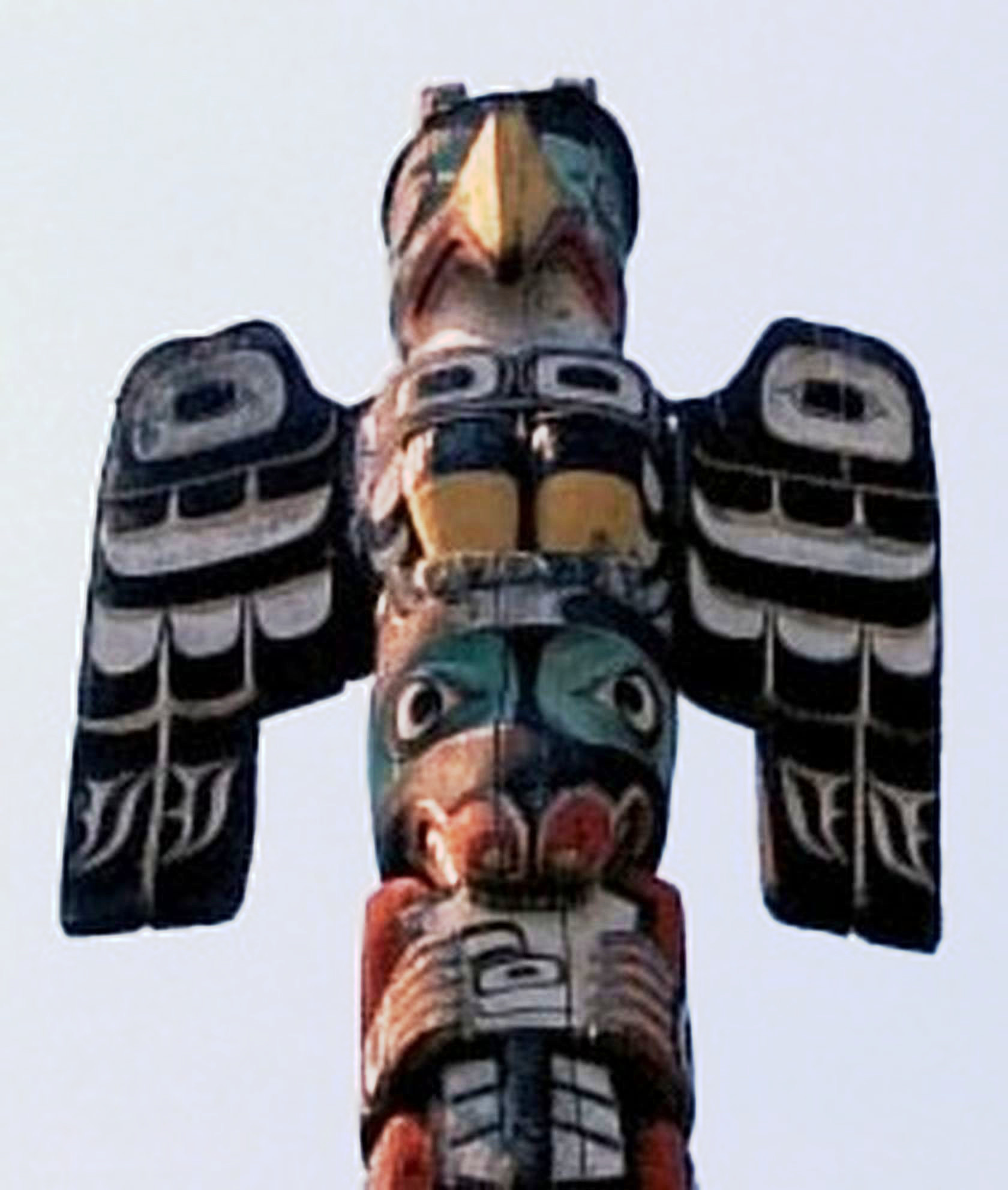
- A Northwest Coast styled Kwakwaka'wakw totem pole depicting a thunderbird.

Creature information
- Similar entities: Rain Bird, Pamola
- Folklore: Indigenous peoples of the Americas

Origin
- Region: North America

The thunderbird is a mythological birdlike spirit in North American Indigenous peoples' history and culture. It is considered a supernatural being of power and strength.

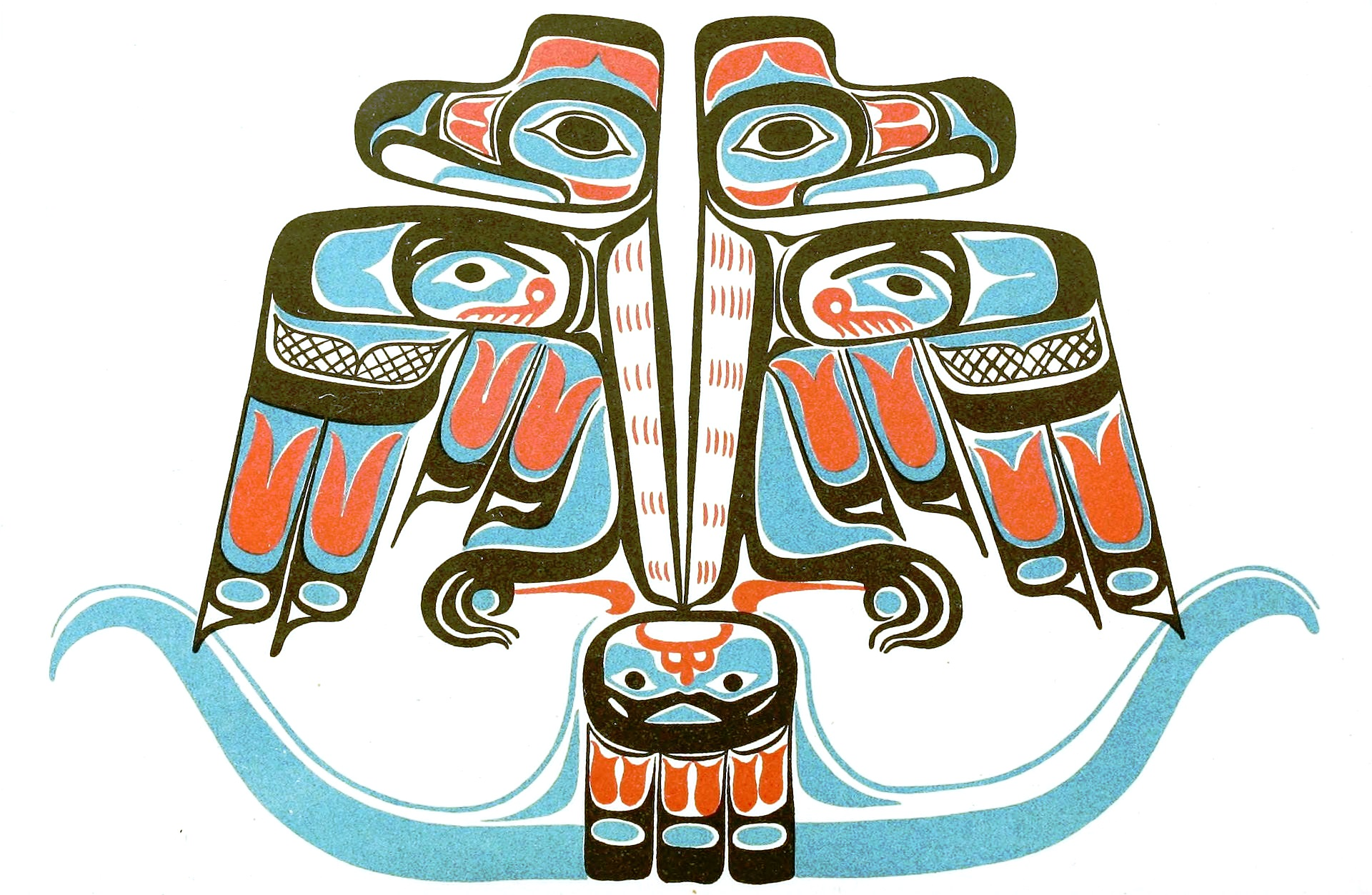
Pacific Northwest (Haida) imagery of a double thunderbird

It is frequently depicted in the art, songs, and oral histories of many Pacific Northwest Coast cultures, but is also found in various forms among some peoples of the American Southwest, US East Coast, Great Lakes, and Great Plains.

== Description ==
The thunderbird is said to create thunder by flapping its wings in Algonquian tellings, and lightning by flashing its eyes in both Algonquian and Iroquois tellings. Across cultures, thunderbirds are generally depicted as birds of prey, or hybrids of humans and birds. Thunderbirds are often viewed as protectors, sometimes intervening on people's behalf, but expecting veneration, prayers, and gifts.

Archaeologically, sites containing depictions of thunderbirds have been found dating to the past 4,000 years.

Petroglyphs of thunderbirds are found near Twin Bluffs, Wisconsin. They are in a shelter that was probably used c. 250 BCE to 1500 CE.

== By people ==
Stories about the struggle between the Thunderbird and Whale (q.v.) have been traditionally told by various Pacific coast tribal groups. Studies have scrutinized the possible connection with the Cascadia subduction zone earthquake in the year 1700 that sent a tsunami to Japan.

=== Algonquian ===
Mississaugas

Ho-Chunk

Menominee

Tribal signatures using thunderbirds on the Great Peace of Montreal

The thunderbird myth and motif are prevalent among Algonquian peoples in Eastern Canada (Ontario, Quebec, and eastward) and the Northeastern United States, as well as the Iroquois peoples (surrounding the Great Lakes). The discussion of the Northeast region has included Algonquian-speaking people in the Lakes-bordering U.S. Midwest states (e.g., Ojibwe in Minnesota).

In Algonquian mythology, the thunderbird controls the upper world while the underworld is governed by the underwater panther or Great Horned Serpent. The thunderbird creates not just thunder (with its wing-flapping) but also lightning bolts, which it casts at the underworld creatures.

Thunderbird in this tradition may be depicted as a spreadeagled bird (wings horizontal, head in profile). They are also quite commonly portrayed with the head facing forward, thus presenting an X-shaped appearance overall (see under §Iconography below).

==== Ojibwe ====
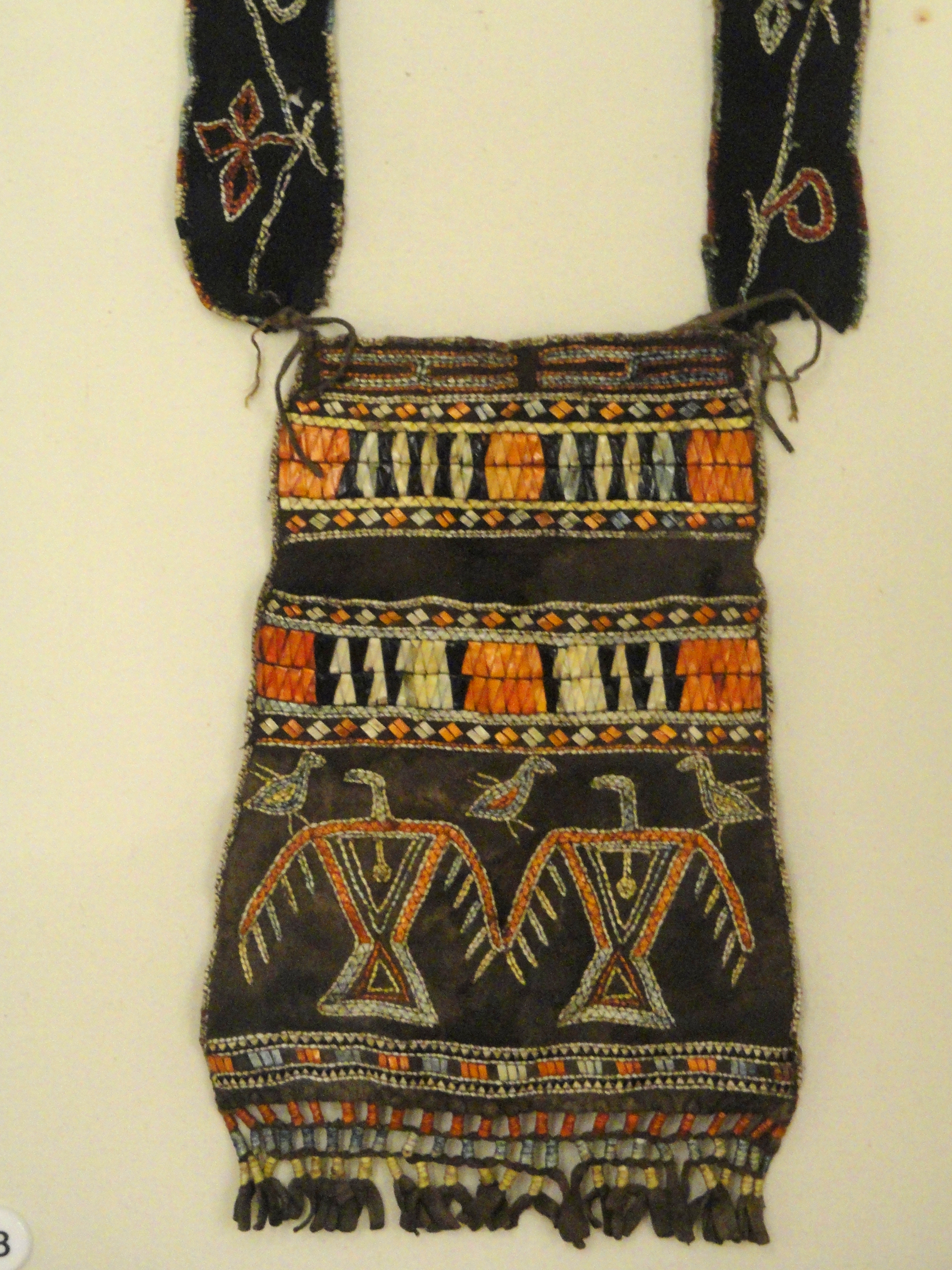
Ojibwe shoulder pouch depicting two thunderbirds in quillwork, Peabody Museum Harvard

The Ojibwe version of the myth states that the thunderbirds were created by Nanabozho to fight the underwater spirits. Thunderbirds also punished humans who broke moral rules. The thunderbirds lived in the four directions and arrived with the other birds in the springtime. In the fall, they migrated south after the end of the underwater spirits' most dangerous season.

==== Menominee ====
In Menominee (Northern Wisconsin) folklore, thunderbirds live on a far-western mountain that floats. The thunderbirds control the rain and hail, and delight in fighting. They continually fight the great horned snakes (the Misikinubik) to keep them from overrunning the earth and devouring humankind. They are messengers of the Great Sun himself.

=== Siouan ===
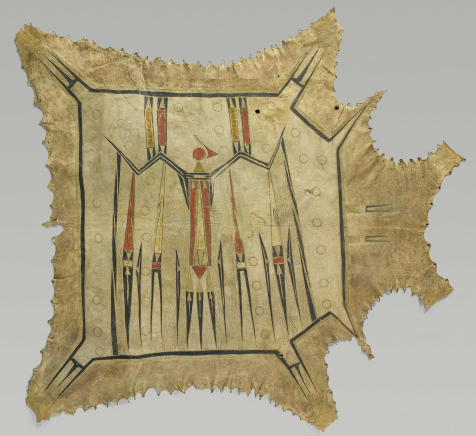
Painting of a thunderbird from the Great Lakes region, likely pre-1800

The thunderbird motif is also seen in Siouan-speaking peoples, which include tribes traditionally occupying areas around the Great Lakes.

==== Ho-Chunk ====
Ho-Chunk tradition states that a man who has a vision of a thunderbird during a solitary fast will become a war chief of the people.

=== Arikara ===
Ethnographer George Amos Dorsey transcribed a tale from the Arikaras with the title The Boy Who Befriended the Thunderbirds, and the Serpent: a boy named Antelope-Carrier finds a nest with four young thunderbirds; their mother comes and tells the human boy that a two-headed Serpent comes out of the lake to eat the young.

== Thunderbird nests ==
A wide variety of circular landscape features found in North America are known—at least in English—as "thunderbird nests", a term which has moved from Indigenous languages into archaeological terminology and popular usage.

=== Stone rings ===
Some thunderbird nests are doughnut-shaped stone rings. In a key archaeological investigation of a thunderbird nest, Patrick H. Carmichael excavated a site on the shore of Lake Wanipigow, Manitoba, known to him as EgKx-15, around 0.5 kilometers east of the mouth of Beaver Creek, labelling it a "Thunderbird Nest" "because this is the manner in which local Native inhabitants refer to such phenomena", and reporting that "an 80-year-old Native from the Hole River Reserve told me quite frankly that the Thunderbird built the nests, for 'what man has the power to lift those great stones?'". Carmichael concluded that "the exact function of the Wanipigow Thunderbird Nests remains enigmatic". They were associated in "popular theory" with vision quests, though Carmichael doubted that this would have been the original use for a structure constructed within a settlement site.

The Thunderbird Nest investigated by Carmichael constituted a "large circular pile of boulders with a central depression or hollow". The ring had an outer diameter of around 6.5 meters and when excavated had a minimum height of one meter. It comprised hundreds of boulders, each estimated to weigh 20–50 kilograms. Excavation revealed no evidence of other structures or of fires on the site, and "the central hollow had no definable floor", though it was not excavated. The site was associated with pottery and stone projectile points suggesting occupation around 500 CE, and Carmichael thought that the nest had been constructed in a single campaign, though this did not prove the date of the nest's construction.

Carmichael was aware of two similar nests elsewhere on the lakeshore and a semi-circular one two hundred meters inland. He was also familiar with examples as far north as Cross Lake, as far west as the Rural Municipality of Alonsa on the west bank of Lake Manitoba, to the southeast on Manitoba's Black River and Caribou Lake as well as in Bissett, and east into Ontario. In the 2020s, Mary E. Gage believed she had discovered an example in New Hampshire. Carmichael thought that although the raw material for the formations he inspected might in some cases have been piles of glacially deposited boulders, their arrangement was "cultural" rather than "natural".

=== Depressions ===
Other thunderbird nests are large pits (similar to the Pukaskwa Pits of Ontario). Reporting on conversations with the Pikangikum First Nation elders Jake Keesic, Charlie Peters, Reggie Peters, Oliver Hill, and Matthew Strang, Marc Stevenson and David Natcher described the thunderbird nests of Whitefeather Forest as "circular boulder field depressions" being 10–30 meters deep and 50–150 meters in diameter, which from Stevenson and Natcher's perspective originated as "geomorphic features of the last glacial period". The elders reported how destructive clear-cutting forestry had been to these sites.

== Iconography ==
=== X-shapes ===
In Algonquian images, an X-shaped thunderbird is often used to depict the thunderbird with its wings alongside its body and the head facing forwards instead of in profile.

The depiction may be stylized and simplified. A headless X-shaped thunderbird was found on an Ojibwe midewiwin disc dating to 1250–1400 CE. In an 18th-century manuscript (a "daybook" ledger) written by the namesake grandson of Governor Matthew Mayhew, the thunderbird pictograms vary from "recognizable birds to simply an incised X".

== Proposed physical analogues ==
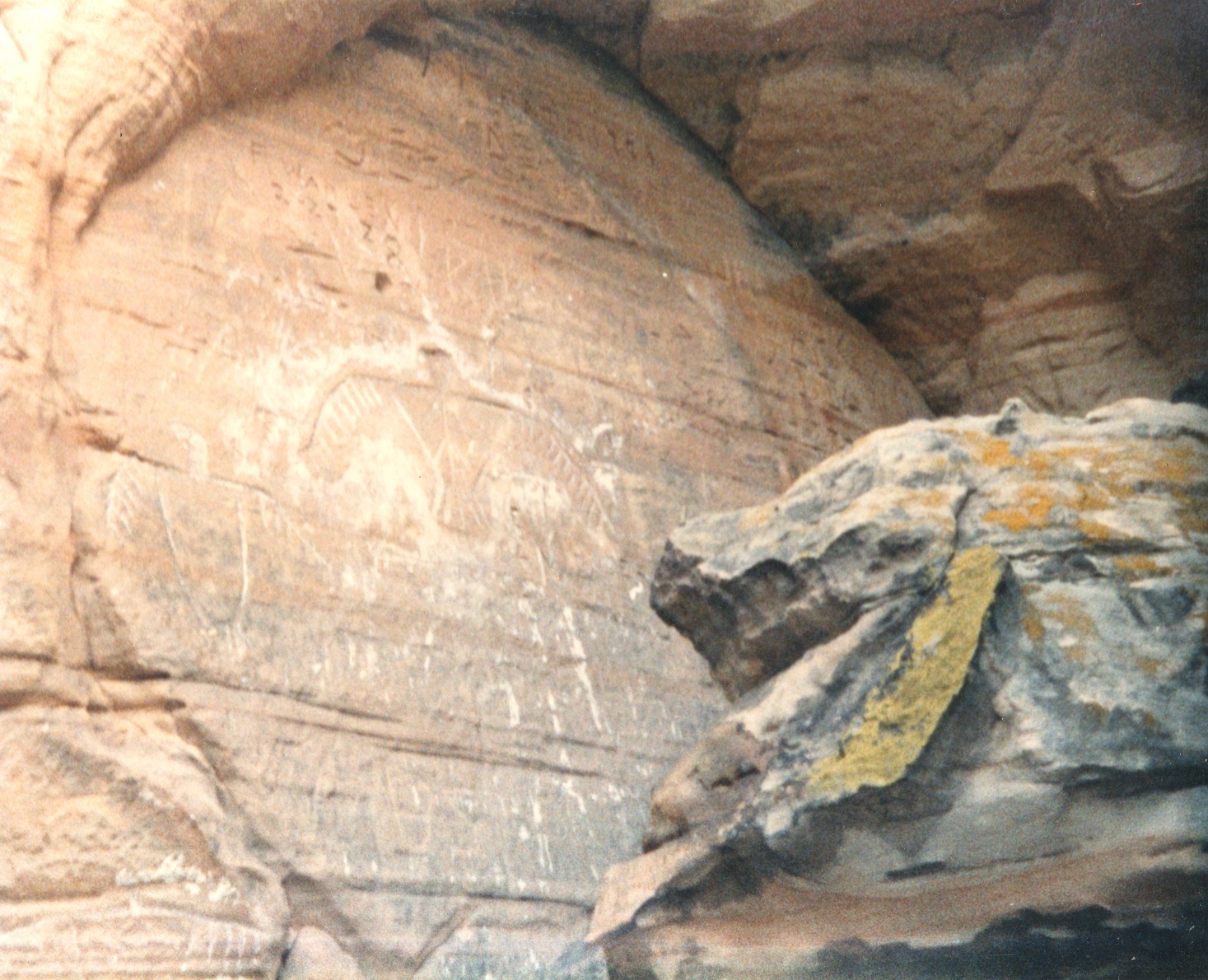
Thunderbirds carved in sandstone wall at Twin Bluff, Juneau County, Wisconsin, by prehistoric artist(s)

Although Indigenous traditions hold that the Thunderbird is not a physical entity but a spirit, the Thunderbird also lends its namesake to a loose subset of allegedly undiscovered animals reported over North America. The term has been variously applied to both descriptions of condor-like and pterosaur-like sightings, a notable example of which is the subject of an alleged photograph from the American West in the late 19th century that was purportedly lost. While proponents have argued the possibility that a prehistoric animal like a teratorn could have survived extinction, the scientific community widely dismisses such types of sightings as the misidentification of known fauna.

American science historian and folklorist Adrienne Mayor and British historian Tom Holland have both offered suggestions for the cultural origin of Indigenous thunderbird narratives from a secular perspective, namely that they may have been based on unrecorded discoveries of pterosaur fossils by Native Americans. Canadian anthropologist Paulette Steeves suggests that the oral tradition of the thunderbird describes memories of the extinct bird of prey Teratornis.

== Outside North America ==
Similar beings appear in mythologies the world over. Examples include the Chinese thunder-god Leigong, the Hindu Garuda and the African lightning bird.

== In popular culture ==
- The shoulder sleeve insignia for the 45th Infantry Division (Oklahoma Army National Guard) was a thunderbird patch after 1939, replacing the swastika as its symbol.
- Several X-Men characters go by the name Thunderbird, the first appearing in 1975.
- The Ford Thunderbird is an American car.
- A WWII-era airfield for pilot training in Arizona was called Thunderbird Field, which in turn was the inspiration for other names, including:
  - The Thunderbird School of Global Management at Arizona State University.
  - The 1960s TV show Thunderbirds created by Gerry Anderson.
- In 1925, Aleuts were recorded as using the term to describe the Douglas World Cruiser aircraft, which passed through Atka on the first aerial circumnavigation by a US Army team the previous year.
- The Pokémon Zapdos is based on First Nations folklore surrounding the Thunderbird.
- Thunderbird is a roller coaster at Holiday World & Splashin' Safari in Santa Claus, Indiana.
- Mozilla Thunderbird is a free and open-source cross-platform email client.
- The Thunderbird is the cap badge and symbol of the Canadian Forces Military Police since 1968.
- Various sports teams are called the Thunderbirds or have Thunderbird mascots, including:
  - The Seattle Thunderbirds of the Western Hockey League.
  - The teams of Southern Utah University, in Cedar City, UT.
  - The teams of the University of British Columbia, Vancouver campus.
  - The Connetquot School District in Long Island, which was the subject of a lawsuit in 2023.
- Thunderbirds can be recruited as units in Heroes of Might and Magic III (1999) and Heroes of Might and Magic IV (2002).
- In Power Rangers Mystic Force, the Yellow Ranger Chip Thorne's helmet design and motif is based on the Thunderbird.
- In the Horizon series, the Stormbird is a giant machine that resembles a thunderbird and can create thunderstorms.
- The Gibson Thunderbird is the bass counterpart to the Firebird guitar.
- The US Air Force’s air demonstration team is named the Thunderbirds after the thunderbird from Native American mythology.

== See also ==
- Lightning bird
- Pamola
- Piasa
- Rain Bird
- Raven (mythology)
- Roc (mythology)
- Hábrók
- Thunder god
- Timeline of pterosaur research

== Sources ==
- Bouck, Jill; Richardson, James B. III (2007). "Enduring Icon: A Wampanoag Thunderbird on an Eighteenth Century English Manuscript From Martha's Vineyard". Archaeology of Eastern North America. 35: 11–19. JSTOR 40914506.
- Cleland, Charles E.; Chute, Richard D.; Haltiner, Robert E. (1984). "NAUB-COW-ZO-WIN Discs from Northern Michigan". Midcontinental Journal of Archaeology. 9 (2): 235–249. JSTOR 20707933.
- Lenik, Edward J. (2012). "The Thunderbird Motif in Northeastern Indian Art". Archaeology of Eastern North America. 40: 163–185. JSTOR 23265141.
