= Alice Harriman =

American writer

Alice Harriman-Browne
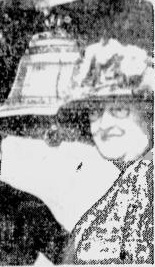
- "Mrs. Alice Harriman" in 1923, in the Lewiston Evening Journal.
- Born: March 12, 1861; Newport, Maine
- Died: December 24, 1925 (aged 64); Hollywood, California
- Occupations: Author; poet; publisher; travel-magazine writer
- Spouse: [First name unknown] Browne
- Relatives: James Harriman (father) Mary E.(Ladd) Harriman (mother)
- Writing career
- Language: English
- Genres: Poetry, short stories, Non-fiction
- Notable works: A Man of Two Countries; Will Thou Not Sing; Chaperoning Adrienne; a tale of the Yellowstone national park

Mary Alice Harriman (March 12, 1861 – December 24, 1925) was a poet, author (of poetry, novels, short stories and non-fiction) and publisher. She was called the "only woman publisher in the world" in the 1911 Who's Who in the Northwest. She published books in Seattle between 1907 and 1910, and in New York after that, closing her publishing business in 1913.

She wrote A Man of Two Countries, Chaperoning Adrienne; a tale of the Yellowstone national park (illustrated by Charles M. Russell) and Will Thou Not Sing.

== Marriage mystery ==
Her married-name signature, used for a short time (1907) before she reverted to using her maiden-name signature.

The only year in which she used the name Harriman-Browne was in 1907 in her books, including the book about Chaperoning Adrienne. The next year, she started a publishing company, using only her maiden name, Harriman. In Seattle, on May 2, 1907, she married Seneca Floraine Browne. She filed for divorce from him in Seattle on 7 January 1910 on grounds of abandonment for more than one year.

She gave different marital statuses when asked to list whether married.

Alice was listed as single in the 1870 census (she was 9) and the 1880 census (she was 19). Most of the 1890 census was destroyed by fire. In the 1900 census and 1910 census, she is listed as divorced. In the 1920 census, as well as the Who's Who guides of 1911 and 1914, she is listed as widowed. Finally, on the Biographical Index Cards, 1781–1990, Sacramento, California: California State Library she is listed as widowed.

== Death ==
Harriman died in Hollywood, California, where she lived.

== Publishing ==
Harriman began publishing books in 1907 in Seattle. She continued there until 1910, moving her business to 542 Fifth Avenue, New York City. Her company was the "Alice Harriman Company, publishers of fine books".

=== Causes ===
Harriman was interested in Native American issues, and friend to Adelaide Hanscom Leeson, of the Photo Secessionist Movement. One Native-American-themed book she published was The Brand by Therese Broderick. This girl's adventure book influenced a young Nez Perce girl living in rural Idaho to become one of the first female Native American writers. That girl, Mourning Dove, wrote Cogewea.

== Books published ==
- Reminiscences of Seattle: Washington Territory and the U. S. Sloop-of-War Decatur During the Indian War of 1855-56 by Thomas Phelps, The Alice Harriman Company, Seattle, 1908 Online text
- Pioneer Days on Puget Sound by Arthur Armstrong Denny, The Alice Harriman Company, Seattle, 1908 Online text
- Lyrics of Fir and Foam Alice Rollit Coe, The Alice Harriman Company, Seattle, 1908 Online text
- Chronicle of Oldfields by Thomas Newton Allen, The Alice Harriman Company, Seattle, 1909 Online text
- Love Never Faileth by J. D. O. Powers, 1909
- The Road of Life, and other poems by Marion Couthouy Smith, The Alice Harriman Company, Seattle, 1909 Online text
- The Brand, a tale of the Flathead reservation by Therese Broderick, The Alice Harriman Company, Seattle 1909 Online text
- Marcus Whitman, Pathfinder and Patriot by Myron Eells, The Alice Harriman Company, Seattle, 1909 Online text
- Songs o' the Olympics by Alice Harriman, illustrated by B. C. Bubb, 1909
- Browning; Biographical notes, appreciations, and selections from his "Fifty Men and Women" by Pauline Leavens, The Alice Harriman Company, New York; Seattle, 1910 Online text
- The Diamond Spider and Other Stories by Elinor Brotherton Butler, illustrated by C.M. Dowling, The Alice Harriman Company, New York, 1910
- A Man of Two Countries by Alice Harriman, The Alice Harriman Company, New York; Seattle, 1910 Online text
- An Athabascan Princess by George Fenwick, illustrated by Max W. Kollm, pub. The Alice Harriman Company, New York; Seattle, 1910 Online text
- Trails Through Western Woods by Helen Fitzgerald Sanders, The Alice Harriman Company, New York; Seattle, 1910 Online text
- The Flame by Louise E Taber, The Alice Harriman Company, New York, 1911 Online text
- The Stairway on the Wall by Augusta Prescott, The Alice Harriman Company, New York, 1911 Online text
- The Temptation of St. Anthony by Gustave Flaubert, The Alice Harriman Company, New York, 1911 Online text
- Wilt Thou Not Sing? A Book of Verses by Alice Harriman, The Alice Harriman Company, New York 1912 Online text
- Yermah the Dorado by Frona Eunice Wait Colburn Online text
- Don Diego by Albert B. Reagan, The Alice Harriman Company, New York, 1914 Online text

== Works by her ==
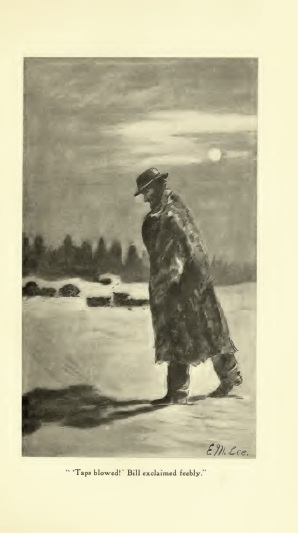
An illustration of a character from Old Bill's Awkward Squad, published 1907 in Tillicum Tales. Original painting by E. M. Lee, story by Alice Harriman-Browne.

- Congress of American Aborigines at the Omaha Exposition in Overland Monthly, San Francisco, June 1899, pages 505-512, Mary Alice Harriman Online text
- Pacific History Stories, Montana Edition by Alice Harriman, The Whitaker and Ray Company, San Francisco, 1903. Online text
- Songs o' the Sound by Alice Harriman with illustrations by Frank Calvert, The Stuff Printing Concern, Seattle, 1906. Online text
- Tillicum Tales: Seattle Writers Club; story inside Old Bill's Awkward Squad by Alice Harriman-Browne, Lowman & Hanford, Seattle, 1907. Online text
- Chaperoning Adrienne: A Tale of the Yellowstone National Park by Alice Harriman-Browne, Metropolitan Press, Seattle, 1907. Online text
- The Lightning Bug, by Alice Harriman and J M S Lane, The Metropolitan Press, Seattle, c1907
- Lemon Juice, formerly published as Lightning Bug, c1908
- Songs o' the Olympics by Alice Harriman, Alice Harriman Co., Seattle, 1909.
- Redcoat and Redskin
- A Man of Two Countries; chapter headings by C.M. Dowling, 1910. Online text
- Wilt Thou Not Sing? A Book Of Verses, 1912 Online text
- Bells and Their Overtones, 1918.
- The bells of El Camino Real, 1925

== See also ==
- Page with biography.
- Late in life, she took an interest in solving a historical mystery.
- A text version of old story, Harriaman's discovery of a Russian Empire bell on the West Coast.
- LA Times version of the Bell Story, with picture of bell.
