= Thomas B. Allen =

Thomas B. Allen could refer to:

- Thomas B. Allen (author) (1929–2018), author and historian
- Thomas B. Allen (painter) (1928–2004), illustrator

== See also ==
- Thomas Allen (disambiguation)
