= Sprinkler system =

Sprinkler system may refer to:

- Irrigation sprinkler, a device for irrigation of lawns or crops
- Fire sprinkler system, the entire systems of pipes and sprinklers intended for fire suppression within buildings
