= Ross Allen =

Ross Allen may refer to:

- Ross Allen (Australian cricketer) (born 1939), Australian cricketer
- Ross Allen (Irish cricketer) (born 1996), Irish cricketer
- Ross Allen (herpetologist) (1908–1981), writer from Florida, USA
- Ross Allen (politician) (1928–2019), New Zealand local politician and cricket umpire
- Ross Allen (footballer) (born 1987), Guernsey footballer
