= Thunderbird and Whale =

Indigenous myth of a number of tribes from the Pacific Northwest

"Thunderbird and Whale" is an indigenous myth belonging to the mythological traditions of a number of tribes from the American Pacific Northwest.

== Overview ==
The myth of the epic struggle between Thunderbird and Whale is found in common among different language/cultural groups of the Indigenous peoples of the Pacific Northwest Coast of America, and seems to be uniquely localized to this area. It is also the major archetypal motif in carvings and painted art, particularly among the natives along the outlying coasts of Vancouver Island, (Note: Ludwin et al. (2005), p. 145;Ludwin et al. (2007), pp. 70–71, citing Malin (1999).) e.g., the Kwakiutl (Kwakwakaʼwakw) or the Nootka (Nuu-chah-nulth) people.

== Examples ==
=== Quileute ===
One version can be summarized as follows:

Whale was a monster, killing other whales and depriving the Quileute tribe of meat and oil. Thunderbird, a benevolent supernatural being, saw from its home high in the mountains that the people were starving. It soared out over the coastal waters, then plunged into the ocean and seized Whale. A struggle ensued; the ocean receded and rose again. Many canoes were flung into trees and many people were killed. Thunderbird eventually succeeded in lifting Whale out of the ocean, carrying it high into the air and then dropping it. Then another great battle occurred on the land.

The famine experienced on Quileute may not necessarily be blamed on the whales, and Thunderbird makes a gift of a whale, its usual prey to the starving folk, as in a version collected by Ella E. Clark (pub. 1953). (Note: "Thunderbird and Whale 1", informant: Jack Ward of Lapush, Washington, who learned it from his father who died in 1954 at age 98.)

There are also disparate short pieces of lore which Clark stitches together into one narrative; with the individual pieces resembling the short lore collected by Albert B. Reagan (mostly 1905–1909).

Thus one narrative tells of the Thunderbird pitted against its prey, the whale which kept trying to elude capture, and this escalated to such turmoil that it uprooted trees, and no tree ever grew back again in the area.

Another narrative is the recurrent battle between Thunderbird and the "Mimlos-Whale", an orca that repeatedly escapes to sea after capture, and this struggle resulted in great tremors in the mountains and leveling of trees, offering a mythic explanation of the origin of the Olympic Peninsula prairies.

=== Kwakwakaʼwakw ===
Some of the lore among the Kwakwakaʼwakw, regarding the Thunderbird's has been collated by Franz Boas. (Note: Multiple whales are claimed to appear in 1d (Boas (1935a) Tales, pp. 27–31) according to Ludwin et al. (2007), p. 70, but no thunderbird appears in this (nor 1a, 1b, 1c) as verified by the motif chart ("Tabulation of story elements", p. 77 and Ludwin et al. (2005), p. 142))

But in Boas's version the battle takes place between Thunderbird and Ōʼᵋmät or K!wēʼk!waxāʼwēᵋ, the leader of the animals. The latter retaliates against Thunderbird carrying away one of his sons, by raising an army carried in an artificial whale. In the battle at the village, Thunderbird's four children (named "One-Whale-Carrier", etc.) are drowned, and Thunderbird himself is killed, survived only by the "nine-month old infant in the cradle".

=== Comox ===
In one of many variant versions of the myth, the sound of the whale dropping into the sea is the source of thunder. A young boy of a Vancouver Island people, the Comox, was fascinated by the sound of thunder, and heard it from behind a point of land. He crossed that point, following the sound of thunder, and discovered the spectacle of the Thunderbird seizing and dropping the whale. The Thunderbird saw the boy, and told him that the story was now his, and he had the right to wear the Thunderbird mask and wings at the potlatch.

== Reconstructing the myth ==
In the 1980s, geologists found evidence that an earthquake, powerful enough to send a tsunami all the way to Japan, hit the American Pacific Northwest in 1700. Some ethnologists believe that "Thunderbird and Whale" is a description of that disaster.
