= Thomas Allin =

Thomas Allin may refer to:

- Thomas Allin (politician) (1757–1833), Kentucky politician
- Thomas Allin (Methodist) (1784–1866), English Methodist
- Thomas Allin (Anglican) (1838–1909), English Episcopalian
- Sir Thomas Allin, 1st Baronet (1612–1685), British naval officer
- Thomas Allin (footballer) (1862–1945), English footballer
- Tom Allin (1987–2016), English cricketer

== See also ==
- Thomas Allen (disambiguation)
