= Tommy Allen =

Tommy Allen may refer to:

- Tommy Allen (footballer, born 1897) (1897–1968), English footballer
- Tommy Allen (Australian footballer) (1914–1965), Australian rules footballer
- Tommy Allen (speedway rider) (born 1984), British speedway rider
- Tommy Allen (field hockey) (born 1946), Irish hockey player

== See also ==
- Thomas Allen (disambiguation)
- Allen (surname)
