= Water timer =

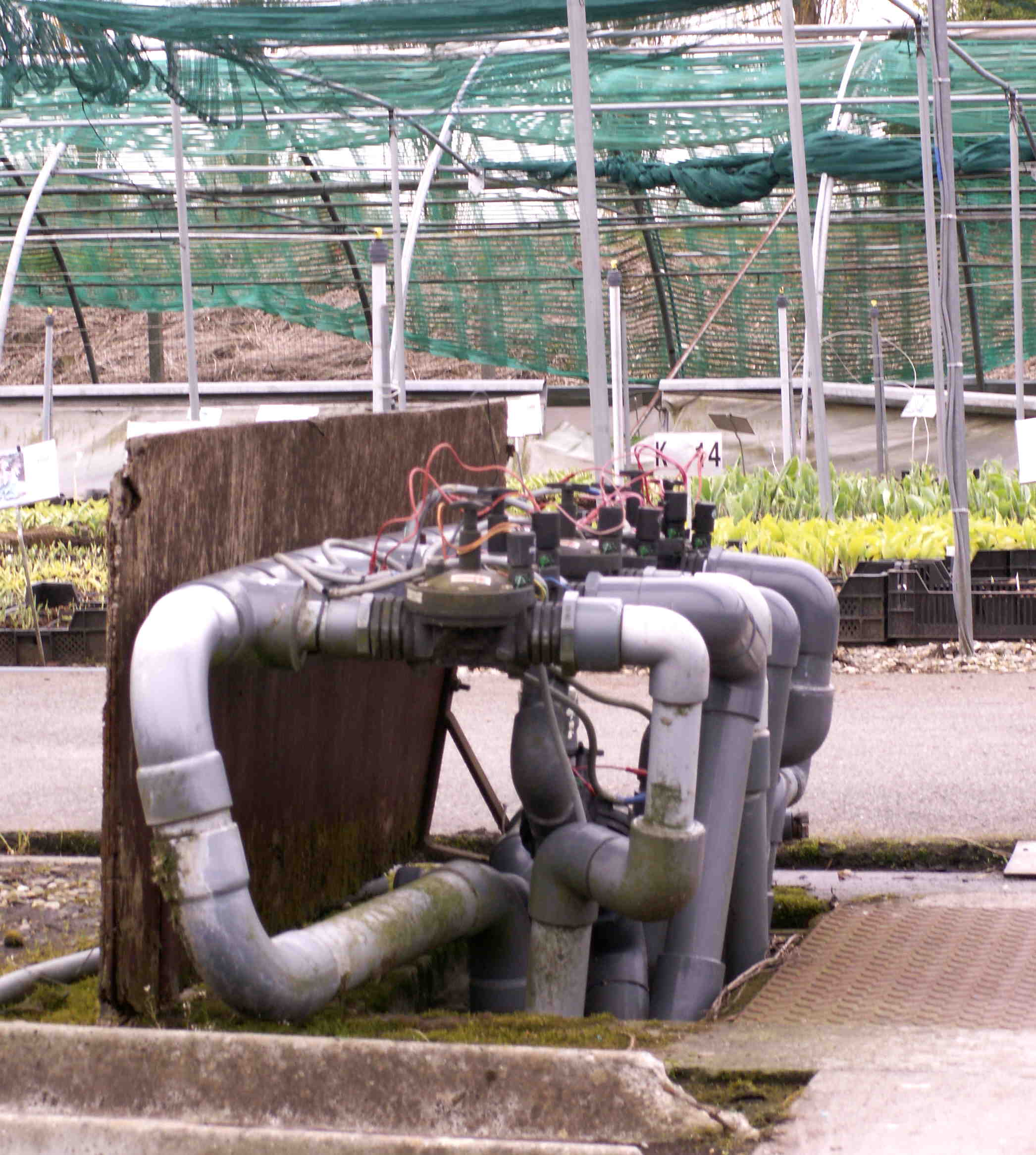
An irrigation line with water timer

A water timer is an electromechanical device that, when placed on a water line, increases or decreases the water flow through the use of an electro-mechanically actuated ball valve or embedded (solenoid) valve. It is used in conjunction with irrigation sprinklers to form an automated or non-automated sprinkler system, capable of administering precise amounts of water, at a regular basis. A water flow timer using a ball valve contains an electric motor with gears to stop or start the water flow by turning a perforated ball within the water flow line. The gearbox in a ball valve timer makes a rumbling sound when actuated. The solenoid type switching timers contain a solenoid that relieves pressure on a diaphragm in the water-flow tube or moves a stopper into the water flow area to regulate flow. The solenoid type uses no gears and makes a tapping sound when the solenoid is activated. Battery powered garden hose timers are the most commonly seen water timers and are seen in two types, the ball valve timer that is actuated by a motor with gears, and the diaphragm timer that is actuated by a solenoid. The solenoid/diaphragm timer uses more battery power throughout the "on" cycle because the solenoid must be actuated the entire time that the water flow is "on". The ball valve timer using the motor and gear actuator only uses more battery power during the few seconds that motor is used to turn the water flow on or off.

== Alternatives ==
An alternative to a water timer to administer precise amounts of water at a regular basis, is to precisely calculate the needed waterflow and arrange a system composed by a time switch and an electric pump. The electric pump is to be arranged to be turned on and off at regular intervals by the time switch to administer (fairly) precise and regular water quantities. This approach, used frequently in DIY watering systems, allows financial savings as the water timer can be discarded. For high-end applications, water timers sometimes allow more flexibility.

== See also ==
- Garden irrigation
- Sprinkler system timer, an electrical device that can control water timers
- Solenoid valve
