= Thomas Allen =

Thomas Allen may refer to:

== Clergy ==
- Thomas Allen (nonconformist) (1608–1673), Anglican/nonconformist priest in England and New England
- Thomas Allen (dean of Chester) (died 1732)
- Thomas Allen (scholar) (1681–1755), Anglican priest in England
- Thomas Allen (Manx author) (1710–1754), vicar of Maughold Parish and author of Manx carols
- Thomas M. Allen (Missouri clergyman) (1797–1871), minister of the Disciples of Christ church
- Thomas Allen (dean of Achonry) (1873–1927)
- Thomas Allen (chaplain) (1743–1810), American Revolution chaplain

== Music ==
- Thomas S. Allen (1876–1919), American composer
- Sir Thomas Allen (baritone) (born 1944), British baritone singer
- Tom Allen (broadcaster) (born 1961), trombonist and radio broadcaster for the Canadian Broadcasting Corporation

== Politicians ==
- Thomas Allen (Cavalier) (1603–1681), English MP for Middlesex
- Sir Thomas Allen, 1st Baronet (c. 1633–1690), Lord Mayor of London
- Tom Allen (Maine politician) (born 1945), U.S. representative for Maine
- Thomas Allen (representative) (1813–1882), railroadman and United States congressman from Missouri
- Thomas Allen (Wisconsin politician) (1825–1905), ninth secretary of state of Wisconsin
- Thomas Newton Allen (1839–after 1909), lawyer and author in Kentucky and Washington
- Thomas Carleton Allen (1852–1927), Canadian attorney and mayor of Fredericton
- Thomas R. Allen (born 1965), Chicago alderman
- Thomas M. Allen (Georgia politician), Baptist preacher and representative in the Georgia Assembly
- Thomas Y. Allen (1852–1933), member of the Virginia House of Delegates

== Sport ==
- Tom Allen (boxer) (1840–1904), heavyweight boxing champion
- Tom Allen (cricketer) (1912–1954), Australian cricketer
- Tom Allen (hurler) (1874–1952), Irish hurler
- Tommy Allen (footballer, born 1897) (1897–1968), English footballer
- Tom Allen (Australian footballer) (born 1930), former Australian rules footballer
- Thomas Allen (sport shooter) (born 1953), Irish sports shooter
- Tom Allen (American football) (born 1970), American football coach
- Thomas Allen (basketball) (born 1998), American college basketball player
- Tom Allen (rugby union) (born 2004), New Zealand rugby union player

== Other people ==
- Thomas Allen (mathematician) (1542–1632), English mathematician
- Sir Thomas Allin, 1st Baronet (1612–1685), officer of the Royal Navy, sometimes known as Thomas Allen
- Thomas Allen (topographer) (1803–1833), English topographer
- Thomas Allen (captain) (1816–1885), South Australian sea captain
- Thomas A. Cullinan (1838–1904), law enforcement officer in Kansas, also known as Tom Allen
- Thomas Isaac Allen (1841–1911), superintendent of the line of the Great Western Railway
- Thomas Allen (Irish Volunteer) (died 1916), member of the Irish Volunteers who fought and died in 1916 Easter Rising in Ireland
- Thomas B. Allen (painter) (1928–2004), illustrator
- Thomas B. Allen (author) (1929–2018), author and historian
- Thomas J. Allen (1931–2020), MIT professor, economist
- Tom Allen (painter) (born 1975), American painter
- Tom Allen (comedian) (born 1983), English comedian
- Thomas D. Allen (fl. 1992), Scout
- Thomas William Allen (1862–1950), English classicist
- Tom Allen (born 1949), known professionally as T.R. Dallas, country and Irish singer and councillor

== Other uses ==
- Thomas Allen & Son Limited, a Canadian book distributor

== See also ==
- Allen (surname)
- Thomas Allan (mineralogist) (1777–1833), Scottish mineralogist
- Thomas Allan (disambiguation)
- Tommy Allen (disambiguation)
- Thomas Alleyn (disambiguation)
- Thomas Allin (disambiguation)
- Tom Allon, American media entrepreneur
