= Impact sprinkler =

Type of irrigation sprinkler

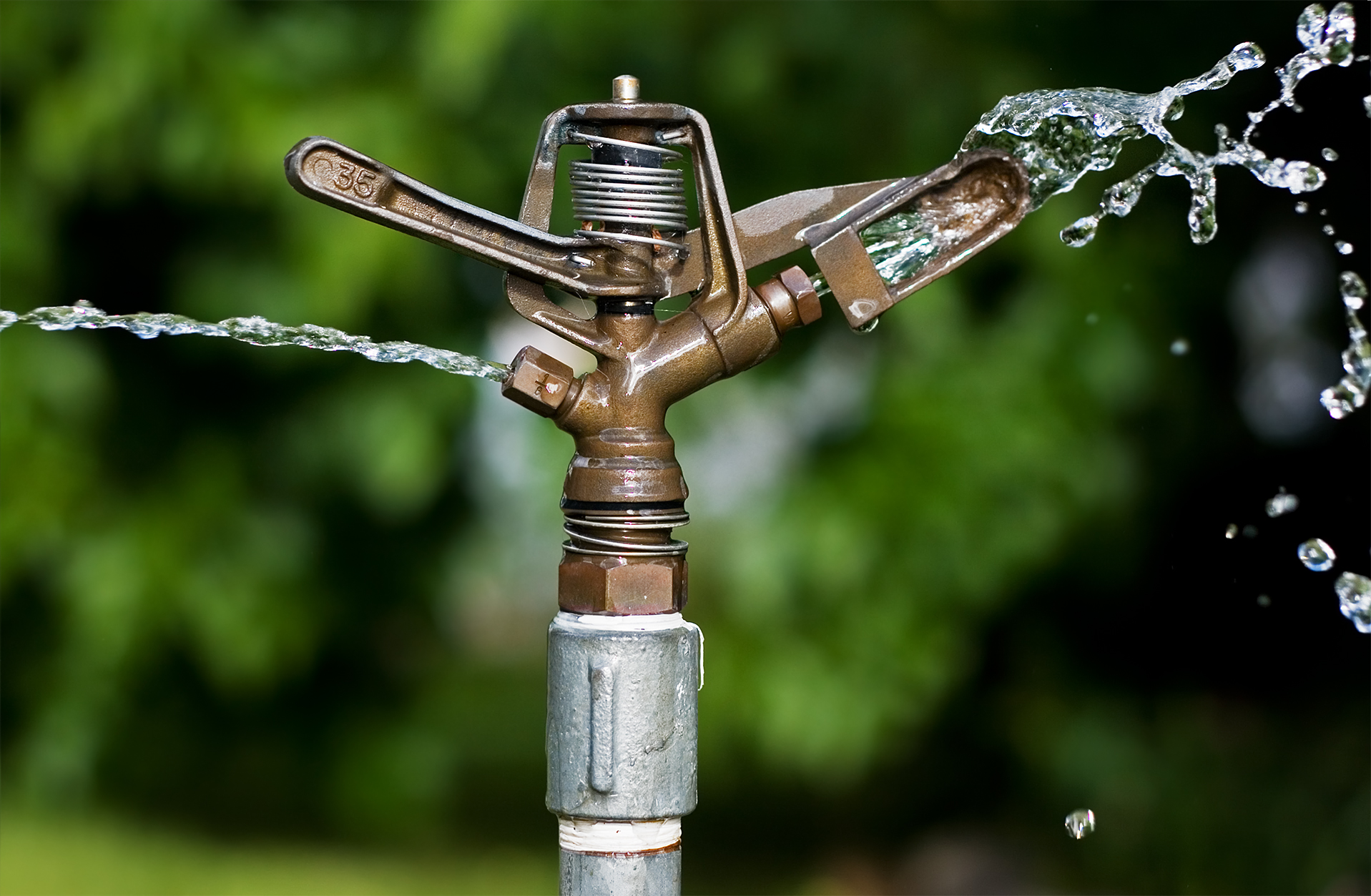
Impact sprinkler head

An impact sprinkler (sometimes called an impulse sprinkler) is a type of irrigation sprinkler in which a rotatable nozzle emits a stream of water for irrigation and that stream drives a rotating mass away from the stream and against a spring, with that mass then returning to impact nozzle mechanism, rotating it slightly each time. Invented in 1933 by Orton Englehart, it quickly found widespread use. Though it has in many situations been replaced by gear-driven rotor heads, many varieties of impact sprinkler remain in use.

== Development ==
The original horizontal action impact drive sprinkler was invented in 1933 and patented in 1935 by Glendora, California citrus grower Orton Englehart. He later sold it to Clem and Mary La Fetra who manufactured and marketed it under the brand name Rain Bird.

== Design and operation ==
The basic design operates as follows: The sprinkler base is fixed to the water pipe with a threaded attachment nut. The head can pivot on a bearing above the base. The force of the outgoing water flings the sprinkler arm in a circular motion. The arm, which is weighted for a particular speed of head rotation, is pushed back into the stream of water by a return spring. At the end of its travel it impacts a part of the sprinkler-head structure. The angular momentum of the arm is thereby transferred into the head so that the whole assembly turns slightly.

Uniform coverage of the watered area was a key point of the design: Already in the original invention, the actuator plate, onto which the stream of water pushes, is shaped so that the jet of water is temporarily broken up, in order to irrigate the portion of the field near the sprinkler. In the later part-circle heads, designed to cover only cover a chosen sector of a circle, the close-range watering-coverage role is provided by the rapid return cycle, while some modern full-circle heads feature an additional, opposing, short range spreader nozzle (see image) for that purpose.

On a part-circle head, two limiting collars can easily be adjusted with the fingers, to achieve the area of coverage desired.

The uninterrupted flow path of impact heads makes them less vulnerable to damage and clogging by dirt and sand in the water. Thus, they are suitable for systems fed by well water. One defining feature of impact heads is that they almost always have male pipe threads, as opposed to the female threads found on virtually all other sprinkler types.

The sprinkler head has conventionally been manufactured from cast metal. Since the 1970s some smaller models also use thermoplastics for improved corrosion resistance.

== Usage ==
The impact sprinkler's long spray radius and uniform water distribution re-creates the effect of natural rainfall, making it suitable for many irrigation tasks. This sprinkler can sometimes be seen on golf courses. The device provides an above-ground alternative to furrow irrigation, in which trenches are dug between rows of crops and flooded.

== Variations ==
An underground pop-up version of the impact sprinkler was introduced as a way to avoid the problem of having to carefully and time-consumingly mow around overground sprinkler heads. When not in operation, these sprinklers disappear out of sight below turf level. Although these variants provide regular convenience, malfunctioning sprinkler heads that fail to retract may become damaged by an inattentive landscaper mowing over them.

Although largely replaced by gear-driven rotor heads by the 1990s, impact sprinklers still have many advantages, including uniformity of coverage, sand and grit resistance, and operation at lower water pressures.
