= Frona Eunice Wait =

American journalist and author

Frona Eunice Wait Colburn
- Born: Eunice Sophronia "Frona" Smith; 19 Aug 1859; Woodland, Yolo County, California
- Died: 1946
- Occupation: Author
- Spouse(s): John Courtland Wait (married 3 August 1875 in Dayton, Washington. Divorced); Frederick Henry Colburn (married 31 October 1900)
- Children: Myretta "Etta" Smith (born c. 1875); Sylvester "Vessie" James Smith (born August 1879, died 18 October 1880)
- Writing career
- Language: English
- Genres: Journalism, Science Fiction, Geological History, California, Wine, Women's newspaper topics
- Notable works: Yermah the Dorado; Wines and Vines of California

Frona Eunice Wait (1859–1946) was an American writer and journalist. From her beginning as a journalist, she rose to become an associate editor for the Overland Monthly.

== Biography ==
Frona Eunice was born in Yolo County, California in 1859. She married John Courtland Wait at a young age in Dayton, Washington. She had two children with Wait, the second of whom, Sylvester James "Vessie" died in 1880. Her circumstances of leaving her husband are unknown but she left him after her son died. From that point she began to work as a journalist, getting her first job with the Santa Rosa Republican newspaper and learning the writing and publishing trade.

In 1887, she was one of only two female staff journalists in San Francisco, working for the San Francisco Examiner. She married Frederick Henry Colburn, October 31, 1900. Colburn was assistant secretary of the Associated Savings Banks of San Francisco, and had spent time in a variety of businesses including publishing, import and export, and being president of the California Business College.

== Overland Monthly ==
Before editing the Overland Monthly, she contributed articles to it, and wrote books such as the futuristic Yermah the Dorado, published by W. Doxey in 1897 and republished by Alice Harriman in 1913. She wrote anti-suffrage political pamphlets, including 80 per cent. of the women in California do not want the vote. She is also known in wine circles for her works on California wines. Her book Wines and Vines of California was called an "unquestionable cornerstone of California wine literature" in Wayward Tendrils Quarterly (published for a wine book collector's society), July 2011.

Frona Eunice Wait Colburn from the November 1923 issue of the Overland Monthly, announcing she was joining the staff

She joined the staff of the Overland Monthly in November 1923 and rose to become an associate editor. She had been working in publishing, writing and journalism for 36 years, having gotten her start in 1887.

As associate editor, she continued to write. In a sampling of the 1928 issues (Volume 86, numbers 1 through 8), she wrote a short story, two non-fiction essays, an obituary, and several book reviews.

She was also the subject of a poem by Ambrose Bierce entitled A Competitor, published in his book The Collected Works of Ambrose Bierce.

She died in 1946.

== Science fiction ==
Cover of the 1913 Alice Harriman edition of Yermah the Dorado by Frona Eunice Wait Colburn.

Although most of her books fall firmly into such non-fiction areas as wine tasting and history, Wait did write one book that is often sold as an early work of science fiction. Yermah the Dorado is an adventure story about an Atlantis, in a place that will become San Francisco 11,000 years later. She published the book originally in 1897. After seeing the effects of the 1906 San Francisco earthquake she made changes to the book. In her reprint of the book, the author called her book Yermah the Dorado a "pre-vision of what is to be".

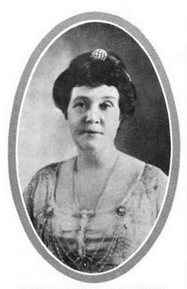
From a 1922 publication.

Though sold as science fiction, there has been an argument about whether many Victorian era books meet the definition of science fiction. Darko Suvin argues that the book is not science fiction because it lacks a distinct science-fiction narrative throughout the book.

== Writings ==
=== Books ===
- The Kingship of Mt. Lassen, at Present the Only Active Volcano on the Mainland of the United States, in the Past California's Greatest Benefactor, Nemo Publishing Company, San Francisco 1922
- The Stories of El Dorado, 1904
- Yermah the Dorado: The Story of a Lost Race, W. Doxey, San Francisco, 1897 and Alice Harriman Company, New York, 1913
- Wines & Vines of California; Or, a Treatise on the Ethics of Wine Drinking, 1889
- In Old Vintage Days ... With Decorations by Dorothy Payne, John Henry Nash, San Francisco, 1937
- Wines of Valencia

=== Pamphlets, articles and other works ===
- My Cousin's Wedding Dress, Overland monthly and Out West magazine, Volume: 18, Issue: 107, Nov 1891, pp. 535-542.
- Where beauty reigns:Mrs. Smith's Gala Society Ball at the Portland Hotel, undated newspaper.
- An interesting and authentic description of a mule-back ride through the quaint, little-known department of Soconusco, Mexico, by Fredrick Henry Colburn and Frona Eunice Wait, 1901.
- John Henry Nash, Master Printer, Out West magazine, 1929.
- The Romance of a Paper Man and a Marble Woman by Frona Eunice Wait Colburn, Overland Monthly, November and December, 1930.
- Online text, Overland Magazine, volume 86, has several articles by Frona Eunice Wait Colburn.
