= Rain Clox =

Irrigation controllers

1970 advertisement for RC-12 and moisture sensor

Rain Clox was the trade name given to a series of electromechanical irrigation controllers produced by the Rain Bird Corporation from 1962 to the late 2000s (decade), and were largely responsible for giving rise to the widespread use of automatic irrigation. The first model was the ME11AB, capable of running 11 stations on two schedules. A scaled-down residential model, the RC-8, was formally introduced in 1968 and was marketed as the "first appliance for the garden". The Los Angeles Times reported in 1967 that architects incorporated the RC-8 into a suburban housing development in Glendale, California, planning on adding the cost of the system to the mortgage. The controllers were used in controlled experiments of swine waste lagoon systems. The product line would later range from compact 3-station mechanical units to 23-station multi-program devices.

The Rain Clox series controllers were known for their durability. In 1997, Rain Bird held a contest to find the oldest functioning controller, eventually locating an RC-8 manufactured in 1964 which was still functioning after it survived a tornado. A considerable online aftermarket for the controllers has appeared following their discontinuation.

== Model Series ==
=== RC ===
Dual-schedule controllers. Compact units have pre-set "Lawn" and "Shrub" stations, while full-size units have individual switches for each station to run on "A" or "B" program, in addition to moisture sensor shutoff capability.

Compact Units

- RC-3
- RC-8
- RC-11

Full-Size Units

- RC-12
- RC-18
- RC-23

=== RC-A ===
These featured a single 14-day watering schedule and 23 possible on-the-hour start times. The RC-A series controllers were later replaced by the RC-B (indoor) and RC-C (outdoor) series following improvements in mechanical design.

- RC-4A - 4 stations, 1–60 minutes.
- RC-7A - 7 stations, 1–60 minutes.
- RC-1230A - 12 stations, 1–30 minutes in 1-minute increments
- RC-1260A - 12 stations, 2–60 minutes in 2-minute increments

=== RC-AB ===
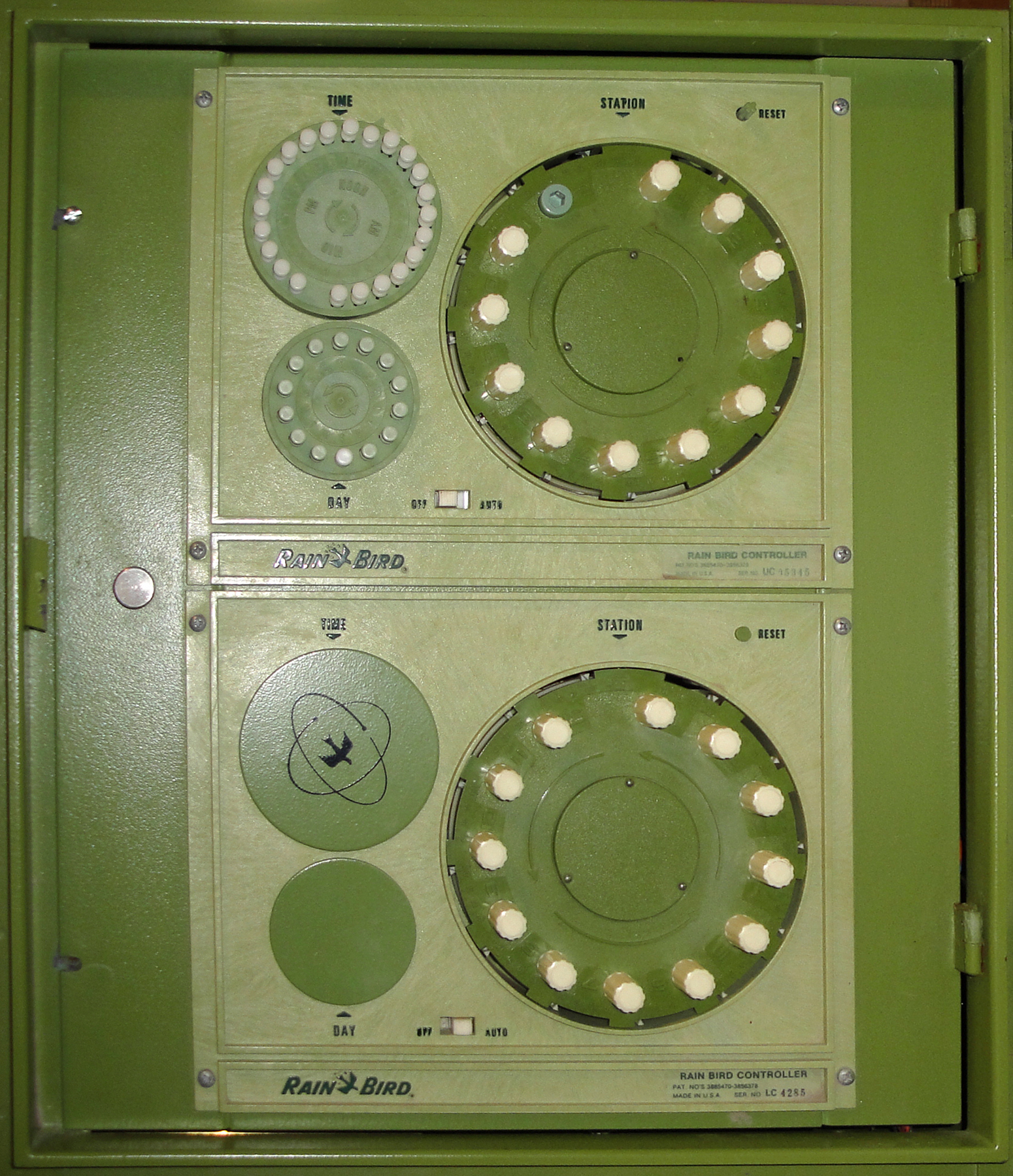
RC-2360AB

These consisted of two RC-A series controllers in one unit which operated in sequence, with the capability of switching off the lower controller on a given day. Zones requiring less watering would thus be assigned to the lower unit. The 12th station on the upper unit was replaced with a tripper mechanism to start the lower unit.

- RC-1830AB - 11 stations, 1–30 minutes in 1-minute increments; and 7 stations, 1–60 minutes in 1-minute increments.
- RC-1860AB - 11 stations, 2–60 minutes in 2-minute increments; and 7 stations, 1–60 minutes in 1-minute increments.
- RC-2330AB - 11 stations, 1–30 minutes in 1-minute increments; and 12 stations, 1–30 minutes in 1-minute increments.
- RC-2360AB - 11 stations, 2–60 minutes in 2-minute increments; and 12 stations, 2–60 minutes in 2-minute increments.

=== MC ===
Master control units for golf courses, which schedule and synchronize multiple satellite controllers. Also features a single RC-12A unit for short syringe waterings on any of the satellites.

- MC-3S - Three sets of day/hour satellite controls, 1-10 minutes syringe watering.
