= Pukaskwa Pit =

Pukaskwa Pits are rock-lined depressions near the northern shore of Lake Superior dug by early inhabitants, ancestors of the Ojibwa, named after the Pukaskwa River in Ontario, Canada. Estimates of their age range from as recent as 1100-1600 CE, to as ancient as 3000-8000 BCE.

== Description and purpose ==
These rock-lined pits are dug in cobblestone beaches and are about one to two metres long and one and a half metre deep. The pits came to academic light in 1949, and were studied by the Royal Ontario Museum, University of Toronto and Lakehead University. Theories about the purpose of these pits range from hunting blinds to food storage pits to spiritual sites. The larger pits or "lodges" may have been seasonal dwellings with domed coverings. The smaller pits may have been used to cook food or smoke fish, but this seems unlikely, since there is never any sign of a hearth or fire-cracked rock close at hand.

Although no archaeological evidence suggests the pits were used ceremonially, their location near spectacular, panoramic views of the lake have suggested a popular theory calling them "thunderbird nest" used for "vision quests".

A new theory suggests that Pukaskwa Pits were used as ice houses: in the spring, beach ice may have been piled into them along with fish or game to be frozen well into the summer.

== Pukaskwa National Park ==
Pukaskwa National Park was established in 1978 to protect a large clustering of these Pukaskwa pits.
