= Thomas Allan =

Thomas Allan may refer to:

- Thomas Allan (mineralogist) (1777–1833), Scottish mineralogist
- Thomas Allan (Scottish footballer), Scottish footballer
- Thomas Allan (footballer, born 1999), English footballer
- Thomas Allan (politician) (1725–1798), Irish politician
- Thomas Allan (publisher) (1832–1894), English collector of songs and music publisher
- Thomas J. Allan (1940–1966), British radio engineer in Antarctica
- Thomas G. Allan Jr., United States Coast Guard admiral
- Tom Allan (footballer) (born 1994), English footballer
- Tom Allan (Methodist) (1864–1932), minister in Western Australia
- Tom Allan (minister) (1916–1965), Scottish minister of the Church of Scotland

== See also ==
- Thomas Allen (disambiguation)
- Tom Allin (1987–2016), English cricketer
- Tom Allon, American media entrepreneur
