= Alice Rollit Coe =

American writer

- Born: Alice Sarah Rollit; Sarah Alice Rollit; September 20, 1858; Rawdon, Canada East
- Died: December 8, 1940 December 8, 1940 (aged 82); Seattle, Washington
- Citizenship: immigrated to U.S. in 1866; naturalized U.S. citizen
- Occupations: Housewife; author; writer
- Spouse: Alfred Byron Coe (m. 1889ׂ)
- Children: Charles Rollit Coe, Winnifred Elizabeth Coe, Algernon Sydney Coe, Constance Mary Coe
- Relatives: John Charles Rollit (father), Elizabeth Spooner Rollit (mother)
- Writing career
- Pen name: May B. Knott
- Language: English
- Genre: poetry
- Notable works: Lyrics of Fir and Foam (1908); Chimes Rung by the University District Herald

Alice Rollit Coe (1858–1940) was a Canadian emigrant to the United States, Seattle housewife and author. She wrote Lyrics of Fir and Foam (1908) and Chimes Rung by the University District Herald (1921).

== Biography ==
She was born Alice Sarah Rollit in Rawdon, Canada East, on September 20, 1858, to John Charles Rollit and Elizabeth (née Spooner) Rollit. Her father was an Episcopal Minister, who moved his family to the United States and was living in Minneapolis with them in 1880. She had at least two sisters growing up.

She married Alfred Byron Coe on November 14, 1889, in Minneapolis, Minnesota, and had four children with him: Charles Rollit Coe (born 1890), Winnifred Elizabeth Coe (born 1892), Algernon Sydney Coe (born 1894), and Constance Mary Coe (born 1901). In the 1920 census in Seattle she was listed as being a teacher. In the 1930 census in Seattle she was a private tutor.

She died in Seattle, Washington, on December 8, 1940.

== Works ==
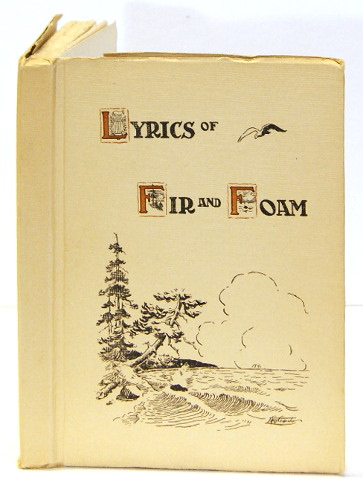
Cover of the 1908 publication of Lyrics of Fir and Foam by Alice Rollit Coe, published by Alice Harriman.

=== Books ===
- Lyrics of Fir and Foam, Etchings by L. Ross Carpenter, The Alice Harriman Company, Publishers, Seattle, 1908
- Chimes Rung by the University District Herald, Press of University Publishing Company, Seattle, 1921

=== Poems in magazines and anthologies ===
- Life's Rose, Out West Magazine.
- The Turn of the Road from The Home Book of Verse, Volume 2.

== See also ==
- Canadian poetry
