= Leo J. Frachtenberg =

American linguist

- Born: February 24, 1883; Czernowtz, Austria
- Died: November 26, 1930 (aged 47); Waterloo, Iowa
- Education: Columbia University (M.A., PhD)
- Occupations: Anthropologist, linguist, Keren Hayesod executive
- Years active: 1910–30
- Spouse: Claudia E. (McDonald)

Leo Joachim Frachtenberg (February 24, 1883 – November 26, 1930) was an anthropologist who studied Native American languages. Frachtenberg helped write the Handbook of American Indian Languages, BAE Bulletin 40, and also wrote "Alsea Texts and Myths", BAE Bulletin 67.

== Early life and education ==
Frachtenberg was born to Abraham Frachtenberg and Jeanette (Rottenstreich) in Czernowtz, Austria, now a city in Ukraine, on February 24, 1883. He graduated from the Imperial Royal Gymnasium, Przemysl, Austria, now in Poland, in 1904.

After immigrating to the United States in 1904, Frachtenberg enrolled at Cornell University. He was awarded a Master of Arts from Columbia University in 1906 where his thesis was titled, Richard Wagner, his life and his works.

During his studies at Columbia, Frachtenberg became a student of Franz Boas, often called the father of American anthropology. Frachtenberg's research centered around some of the subdivisions of what later became the Penutian language group, and he received a PhD from Columbia in 1910 for his work on the Coosan languages.

== Professional career ==
Frachtenberg lectured in anthropology at Columbia until 1912, and in 1913 he became a "Special Ethnologist" at the Smithsonian Institution's Bureau of American Ethnology (BAE). While at BAE, he taught students at Chemawa Indian School in Salem, Oregon. From the school, he studied the ethnology of Alsea, Siletz, Quileute, Chimakum, and Shasta peoples with attention to art and religion.

In late 1917, after returning from Salem to Washington, D.C., Frachtenberg was abruptly fired from his job at BAE for making comments derogatory to the government of the United States, at a time of heightened nationalism and World War I. Franz Boas tried to defend him, but the Secretary of the Smithsonian, Charles Walcott, dismissed him because he believed the comments were "inimical to the public welfare." He did not, however, consider the comments disloyal, or treasonous.

Frachtenberg had immigrated from then Austria-Hungary, part of the Central Powers. Ironically, after his termination from BAE, Frachtenberg joined the United States Army and attained the rank of lieutenant colonel by the time of his discharge in 1920.

== Jewish welfare activities ==
After military service, Frachtenberg became general secretary of the Young Men's Hebrew Association in Troy, New York. He was also national field director of Keren Hayesod during the 1920s.

While conferring with Jewish leaders in Waterloo, Iowa, in 1930, Frachtenberg became ill. He died a few days later from pneumonia at the age of 47.

== Published work ==
- Andrade, Manuel J.; & Frachtenberg, Leo J. (1931). Quileute texts. Columbia University contributions to anthropology (Vol. 12). New York: Columbia University Press.
- Bernstein, Jay H. (2002) "First Recipients of Anthropological Doctorates in the United States, 1891–1930" American Anthropologist 104 (2): 551–564
- Frachtenberg, Leo J. (1913). Coos texts. California University contributions to anthropology (Vol. 1). New York: Columbia University Press. (Reprinted 1969 New York: AMS Press).
- Frachtenberg, Leo J. (1914). Lower Umpqua texts and notes on the Kusan dialect. California University contributions to anthropology (Vol. 4, pp. 141–150). (Reprinted 1969, New York: AMS Press).
- Frachtenberg, Leo J. (1922). Coos: An illustrative sketch. In Handbook of American Indian languages (Vol. 2, pp. 297–429). Bulletin, 40, pt. 2. Washington:Government Print Office (Smithsonian Institution, Bureau of American Ethnology).
- Frachtenberg, Leo J. (1922). Siuslawan (Lower Umpqua): an illustrative sketch. In Handbook of American Indian languages (Vol. 2, pp. 431–629). Bulletin, 40, pt. 2. Washington:Government Print Office (Smithsonian Institution, Bureau of American Ethnology).

== See also ==
Albert B. Reagan
