= Ross Allen (Australian cricketer) =

Australian cricketer (born 1939)

Personal information
- Born: 12 August 1939 (age 87); Toowoomba, Queensland, Australia
- Source: Cricinfo, 1 October 2020

Ross Allen (born 12 August 1939) is an Australian cricketer. He played in one first-class match for Queensland in 1962/63. His father was Tom Allen who also represented Queensland in First-class cricket.

== See also ==
- List of Queensland first-class cricketers
