= Thomas Newton Allen =

American lawyer

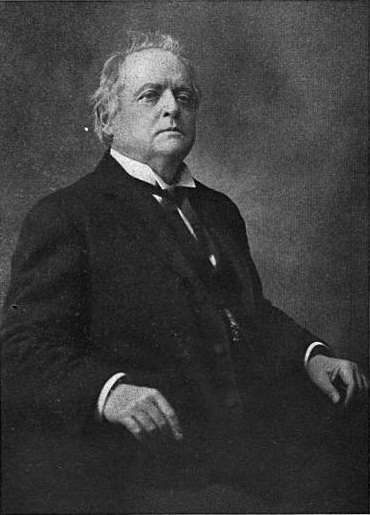
- Thomas Newton Allen from his book Chronicles of Oldfields.
- Born: October 24, 1839; Winchester, Kentucky, U.S.
- Died: May 26, 1910 (aged 70); Olympia, Washington, U.S.
- Occupations: Lawyer, author
- Spouse: Harriet Frances (Stamps) Allen
- Children: Martha B. Allen (c1868); Thomas S. Allen(born c1870); James Allen (born January 1871); Eliza "Bessie" D. Allen (born October 1872); Bryan H. Allen (born February 1877); Robert M. Allen (born September 1879); Harriet B. Allen (born January 1882)
- Writing career
- Language: English
- Notable work: Chronicles of Oldfields.

Thomas Newton Allen (October 24, 1839 – May 26, 1910) was an American lawyer in Lexington, Kentucky. He moved to Olympia, Washington c1889, where he was a clerk and then a lawyer. He was friend to the state governor John H. McGraw. Allen is remembered today for writing a book, Chronicles of Oldfields in 1909, which is found on lists of books for those studying slavery in the United States.

Some of his correspondence is kept at Washington State University, Holland Library, Manuscripts, Archives & Special Collections, Allen, Thomas Newton. Papers, 1889–1893.

== Books ==
- Chronicle of Oldfields, published by The Alice Harriman Company, Seattle, 1909 Online text

== Other censuses ==
Thomas Newton Allen and family were found on other censuses than were used for the article. The information is below for those interested:

- 1900 US Federal Census, year 1900; location Olympia Ward 5, Thurston, Washington; roll T624_1672; pages 10b and 11a; starting on line 99; enumdist 228.
- 1910 US Federal Census, year 1910; location Olympia, Thurston, Washington; roll T623 1752; page 2B; starting on line 81; enumdist 0307; Image 1072; FHL Number 1375685.
