= Marion Couthouy Smith =

American poet

Marion Couthoy Smith
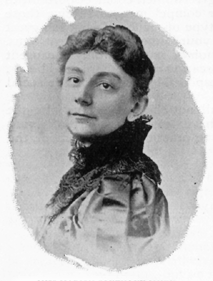
- A photo of Marion Couthoy Smith taken for the Chicago World's Fair, originally published in The Congress of Women: Held in the Woman's Building, World's Columbian Exposition, Chicago, U. S. A., 1893. Chicago, Ill: Monarch Book Company, 1894.
- Born: October 22, 1853; Philadelphia, Pennsylvania, US
- Died: November 19, 1931 (aged 78); New York, New York, US
- Occupations: Author, poet
- Relatives: Henry Pratt (father); Maria Couthouy Williams (mother)
- Writing career
- Language: English
- Genre: Poetry

Marion Couthouy Smith (1853–1931) was a poet from the United States. She published three books of poetry between 1906 and 1918 and individual poems through the Harper's Magazine, Century Magazine, Atlantic Monthly, and The New England Magazine.

== Biography ==
Marion Couthouy Smith was born in Philadelphia on October 22, 1853 the daughter of Henry Pratt and Maria Couthouy Williams. She graduated 1871 from Miss A. M. Anable's school in Philadelphia.

She died in New York City on November 19, 1931.

== Books ==
- Chorister No. 13, a poem, cover by Lee Baker, James Pott & Company, Publishers, c. 1891.
- A Working Woman published in serial in The Living Church
- Dr. Marks, Socialist, 1897
- The Electric Spirit and Other Poems, 1906
- The Road of Life and Other Poems, 1909
- The Final Star, poems, 1918
