= Albert B. Reagan =

Professor of anthropology (1871–1936)

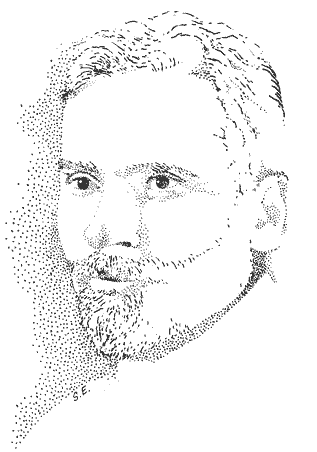
- Albert B. Reagan, computer drawing taken from Utah Academy of Sciences, Arts, and Letters Proceedings 16 (1939), published on US Geological Survey website.
- Born: January 22, 1871
- Died: May 20, 1936 (aged 65)
- Occupations: Anthropologist, Professor, Writer
- Writing career
- Language: English
- Genres: History, Anthropology
- Subjects: Native American peoples and customs

Professor Albert B. Reagan (January 22, 1871 - May 20, 1936) was an American author and historian of Native American history; at the time of his death, he was professor of anthropology at Brigham Young University. He documented Native American customs and folklore in New Mexico, Arizona, Minnesota, Colorado, Washington, and Utah, for tribes that include the Jemez people, Navajo people, Ojibwe people, Quileute people, and Ute people.

His extensive notes and research are kept in the L. Tom Perry Special Collections at Brigham Young University.

== Early life and education ==
Reagan was born in Iowa; after spending three years in Kansas, he returned to Iowa as a school teacher.

He studied at Valparaiso University, the Indiana University and Stanford University; he went on work with the field service of the Office of Indian Affairs.

== Career ==
Reagan carried out ethnological, archeological and geological research and published papers on anthropology, botany, meteorology and ethnology.

He taught at the Quileute Day School and published ethnology findings from his time there.

He published a book, Don Diego, through the Alice Harriman Company in New York in 1914.

He wrote two articles about the influenza epidemic of 1918, which are among the most widely cited primary sources about the impact of the epidemic among the Navajo. He had arrived in Navajo country in October 1918, after being appointed the Indian Service school administrator at Marsh Pass near Kayenta, Arizona.

== Publications ==
Reagan's books include:

- Don Diego
- Notes on the Indians of the Fort Apache Region
- Archaeological Notes on Western Washington and Adjacent British Columbia
- The Boise Forte Indian Reservation in Minnesota

== Family life ==
Reagan was married to Otilla Reese for over 30 years.

== See also ==
- Leo J. Frachtenberg
