= Tommy Allen (Australian footballer) =

Australian rules footballer (1914–1965)

Personal information
- Full name: Thomas William Allen
- Born: 10 September 1914; South Melbourne, Victoria
- Died: 27 June 1965 (aged 50); South Melbourne, Victoria
- Original team: South Melbourne Districts
- Height: 173 cm (5 ft 8 in)
- Weight: 80 kg (176 lb)

Playing career^{1}
Years	Club	Games (Goals)
1936–1938	South Melbourne	26 (8)
- ^{1} Playing statistics correct to the end of 1938.

Thomas William Allen (10 September 1914 – 27 June 1965) was an Australian rules footballer who played with South Melbourne in the Victorian Football League (VFL), and with Port Melbourne in the Victorian Football Association (VFA).

== Family ==
The son of William Allen, and Sarah Allen, née Archer, Thomas William Allen was born on 10 September 1914. He was the older brother of George Allen who also played for South Melbourne. He died in South Melbourne on 27 June 1965.
