= Thomas Allin (Methodist) =

Thomas Allin (1784–1866) was an English ordained minister in the Methodist New Connexion, a breakaway denomination of the Methodist Church, which was established in Hanley, Stoke-on-Trent in 1797. Thomas Allin was born in Shropshire, England, on 10 February 1784. He died on 6 November 1866.

== Selected works ==
- To the Wesleyan Methodist delegates assembled in Manchester 1834
- Vindication of the Methodist New Connexion 1841
