= Tom Allen (cricketer) =

Australian cricketer (1912–1954)

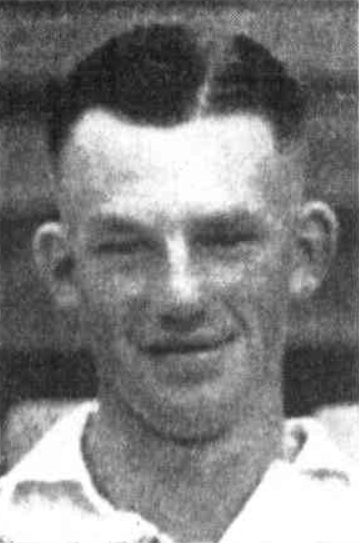
- Allen in 1937

Personal information
- Born: 5 September 1912; Toowoomba, Queensland, Australia
- Died: 18 March 1954 (aged 41); Cambooya, Queensland, Australia
- Source: Cricinfo, 1 October 2020

Tom Allen (5 September 1912 – 18 March 1954) was an Australian cricketer. He played in 43 first-class matches for Queensland between 1933 and 1941.

== Biography ==
Allen was from the rural town of Greenmount near Toowoomba and he attended Toowoomba Grammar School. He played cricket for Toowoomba, ultimately captaining the Toowoomba XI, and was described as possibly the best opening batsman ever produced by Toowoomba in 1933. In 1933, he was selected for the Queensland State side, and the following year he was named State vice-captain. He briefly captained the State team in 1936 and scored a century against the touring English side during the 1936/37 Ashes, and later served as a Queensland State selector.

In his career Allen was a farmer in Cambooya and he died there in 1954. In his personal life he married Noel Vaughan in 1937, and they had three children. His son Ross Allen also played First-class cricket for Queensland.

== See also ==
- List of Queensland first-class cricketers
