= Rain Bird (legend) =

Mythological bird

The Rain Bird in Native American legend was a bird who brought rain. The Rain Bird was known by coastal Native Americans as the bringer of life. The reason behind it was that Rain, or the bringer of life, brought life to the coastal Natives by watering their plants, thus giving food and water to the animals they hunted; it controls everything from the sky and is father of the sky children. The Rain Bird is one of the most common designs on Pueblo pottery made by, for example, the Hopi and Zuni.

== Other uses ==
The name was taken by the Rain Bird Corporation to name their irrigation sprinkler.

== See also ==
- Lightning bird
- List of legendary birds
- Shangyang (rainbird) – Mythological Chinese rainbird
