= Irrigation sprinkler =

Method of irrigating lawns and crops

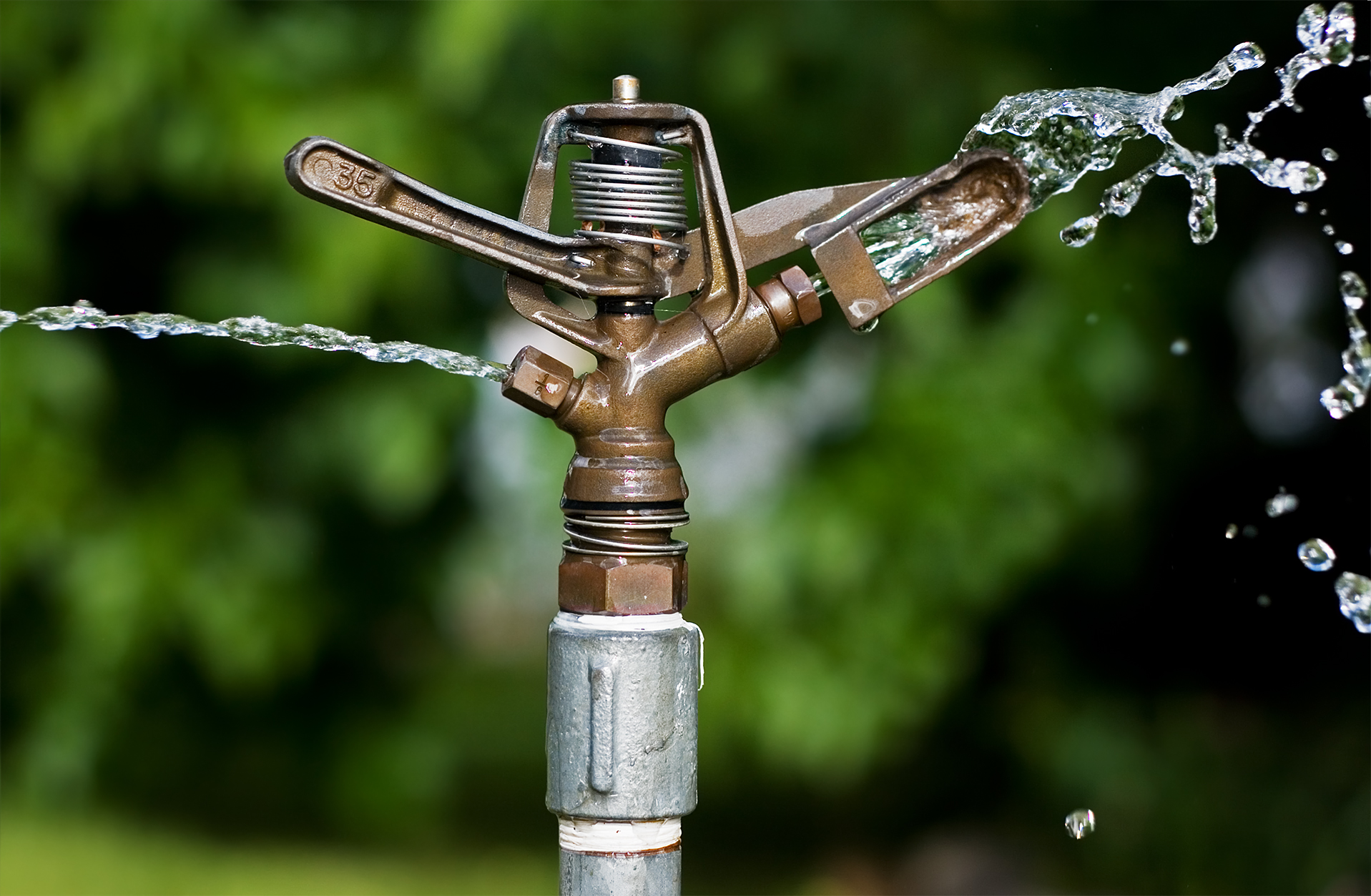
An impact sprinkler head in action

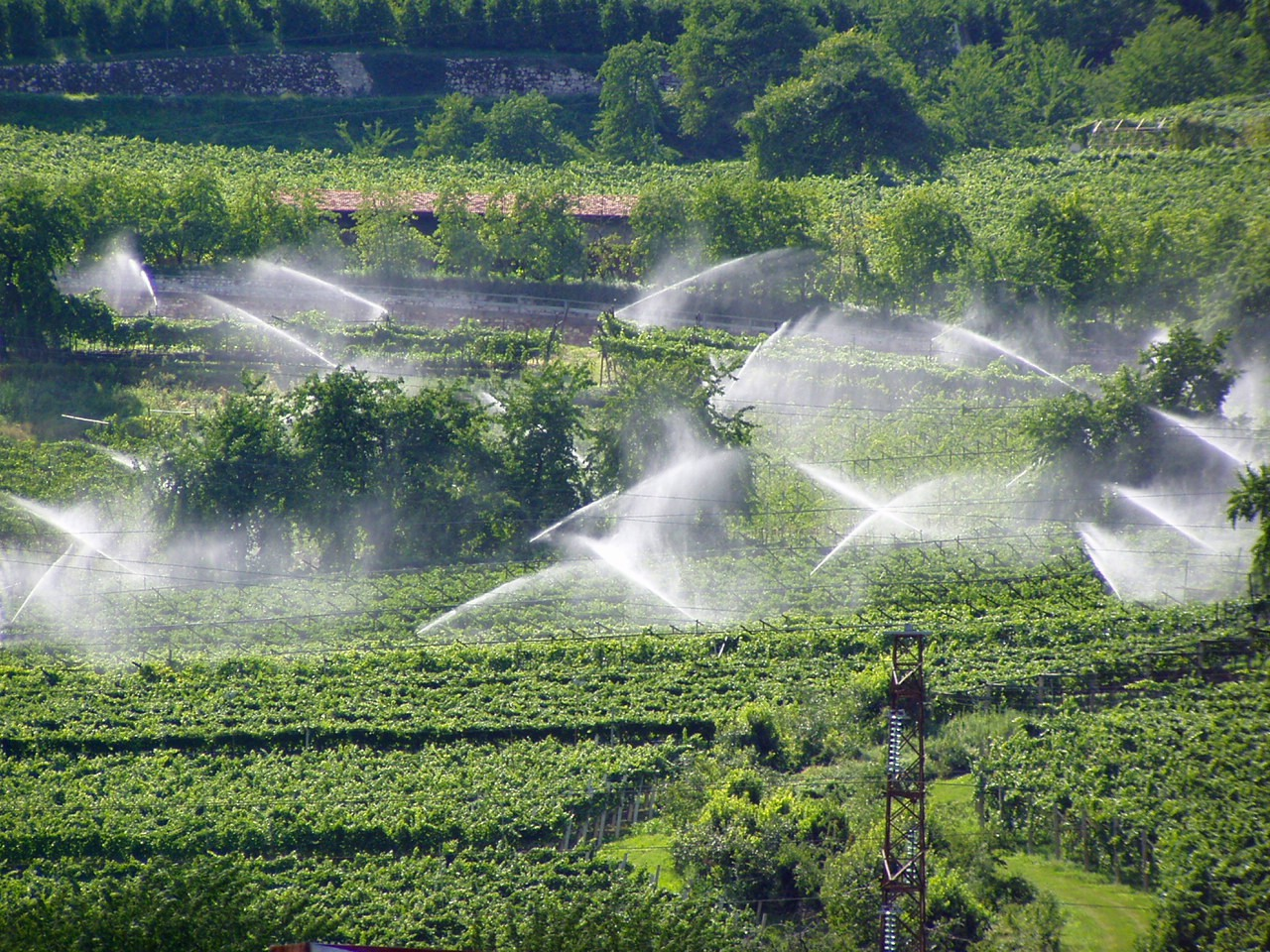
Sprinklers spraying water to irrigate vine plants in a vineyard

An irrigation sprinkler (also known as a water sprinkler or simply a sprinkler) is a device used to irrigate (water) agricultural crops, lawns, landscapes, golf courses, and other areas. They are also used for cooling and for the control of airborne dust. Sprinkler irrigation is the method of applying water in a controlled manner that mimics rainfall. The water is distributed through a network that may consist of pumps, valves, pipes, and sprinklers.

== Types ==
=== Industrial ===
Rotating sprinkler heads for higher pressures are driven by ball-drive, gear-drive, or impact mechanisms. They can be designed to rotate in a full or partial circle.

Rainguns are similar to impact sprinklers, except that they generally operate at very high pressures of 2.8 to 9.0 bar (280 to 900 kPa; 40 to 130 lbf/in^{2}) and flows of 3 to 76 L/s (50 to 1,200 US gal/min), usually with nozzle diameters in the range of 10 to 50 mm (0.5 to 1.9 in). In addition to irrigation, rainguns are used for industrial applications such as dust suppression and logging.

Many irrigation sprinklers are buried in the ground along with their supporting plumbing, although above-ground and moving sprinklers are also common. Most irrigation sprinklers operate through electric and hydraulic technology and are grouped together in zones that can be collectively turned on and off by actuating a solenoid valve.

=== Residential ===
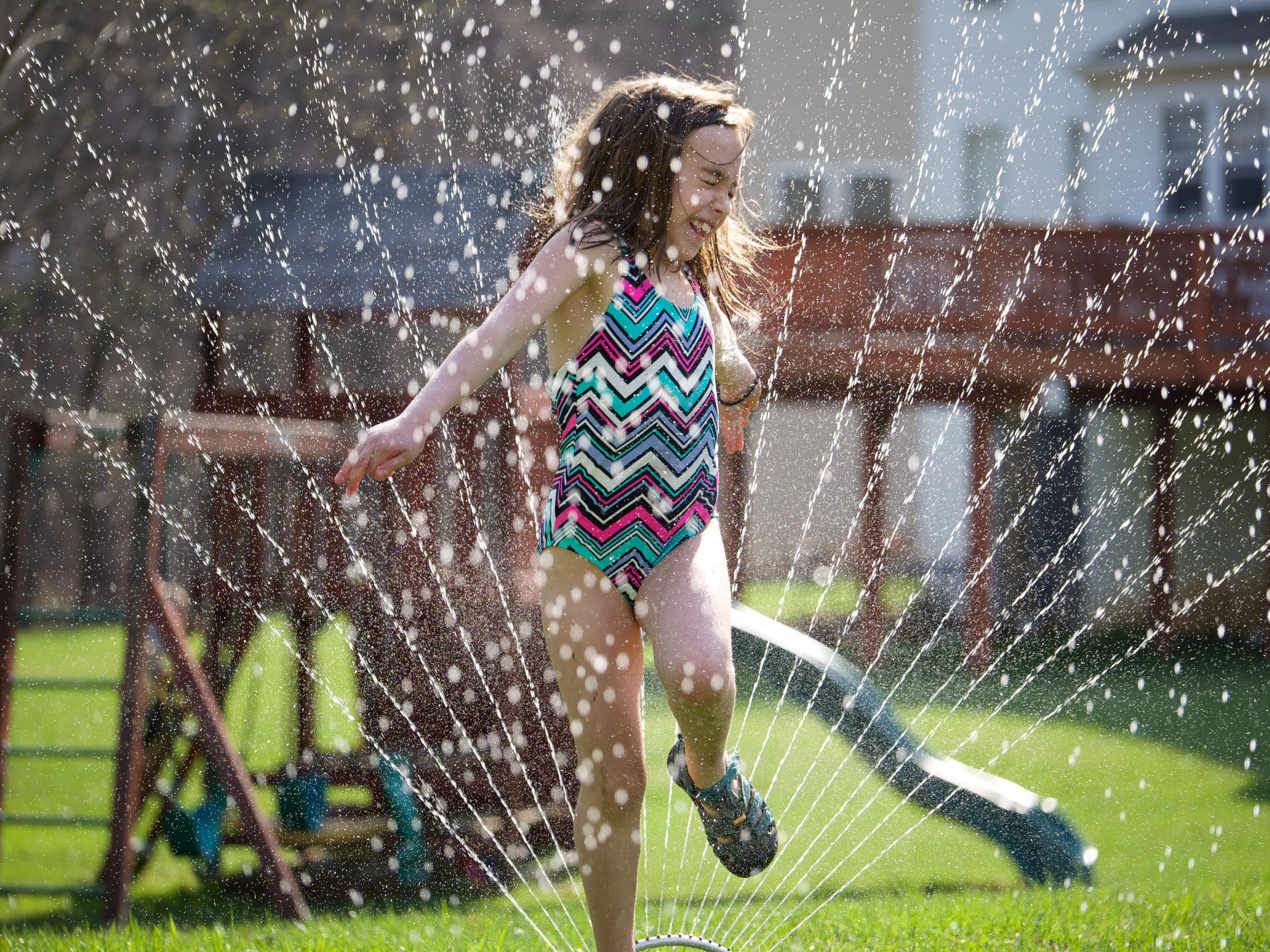
An oscillating sprinkler is commonly used to water residential lawns, and is moved as needed.

Home lawn sprinklers vary widely in their size, cost, and complexity. They include impact sprinklers, oscillating sprinklers, and drip sprinklers, both in underground sprinkler systems and portable form. Permanently installed systems often operate on timers for scheduling. They are occasionally installed with retractable heads for aesthetic and practical reasons, reducing damage during lawn mowing.

Small portable sprinklers can be placed temporarily on lawns if additional watering is needed or if no permanent system is in place. These are often attached to an outdoor water faucet and are placed for a short period of time. Other systems may be professionally installed permanently in the ground and are attached permanently to a home's plumbing system.

An sprinkler developed by Nomad called a 'set-and-forget tractor sprinkler' was used in Australia in the 1950s. Water pressure ensured that the sprinkler moved slowly across a lawn.

Some modern sprinkler irrigation systems employ precision or site-specific techniques that vary water application spatially in response to local soil or plant conditions, rather than applying water uniformly across an area. Several commercial sprinkler systems have been developed to implement site-specific irrigation in residential and landscape settings, including those developed by Irrigreen. Modern residential sprinkler systems may use smart controllers, rain sensors, soil moisture sensors, and separate watering zones to adjust irrigation based on weather, soil moisture, and landscape needs.

=== Agricultural science ===
Sprinkler nozzles, as used in center-pivot crop irrigation

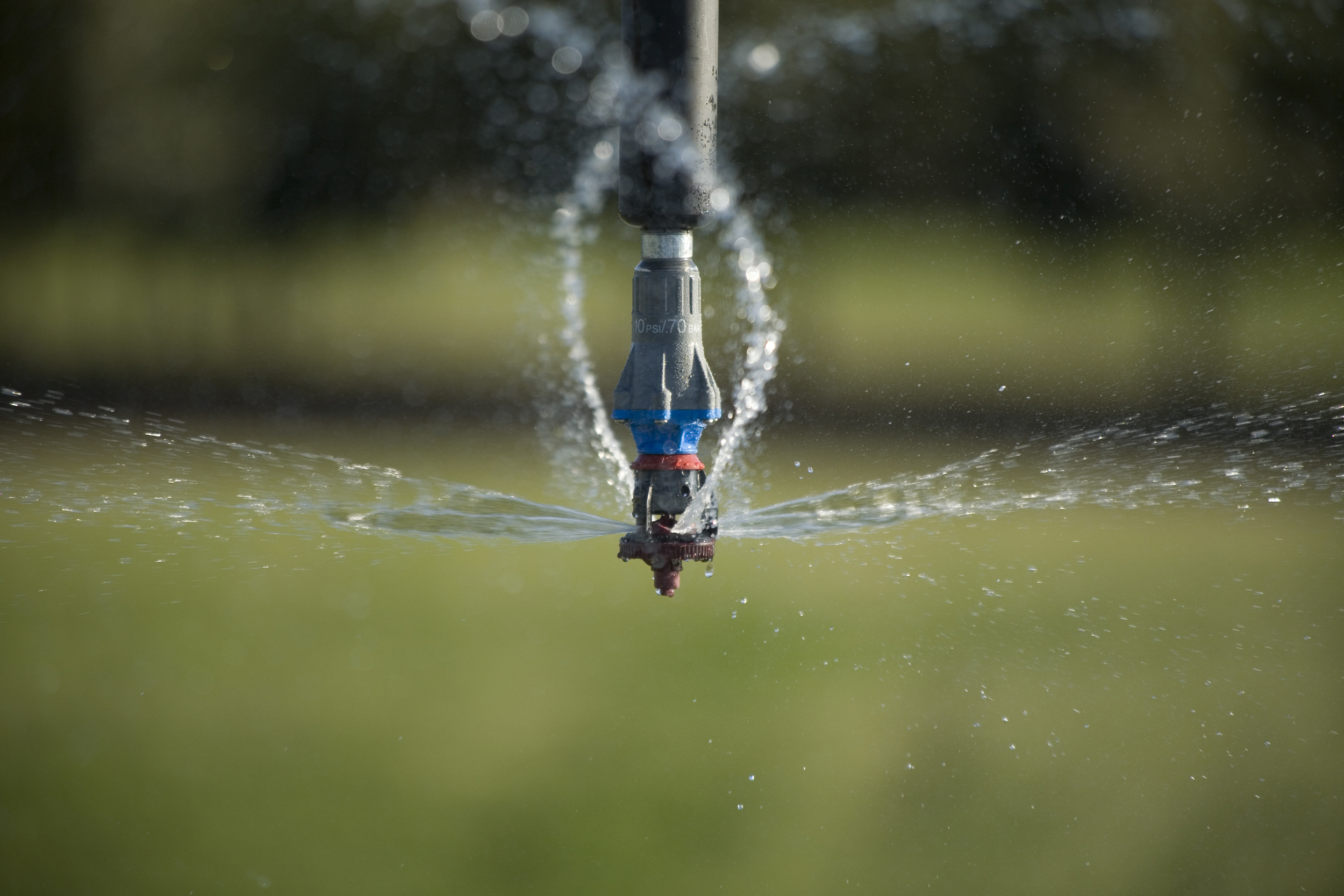
Rotator-style sprinkler

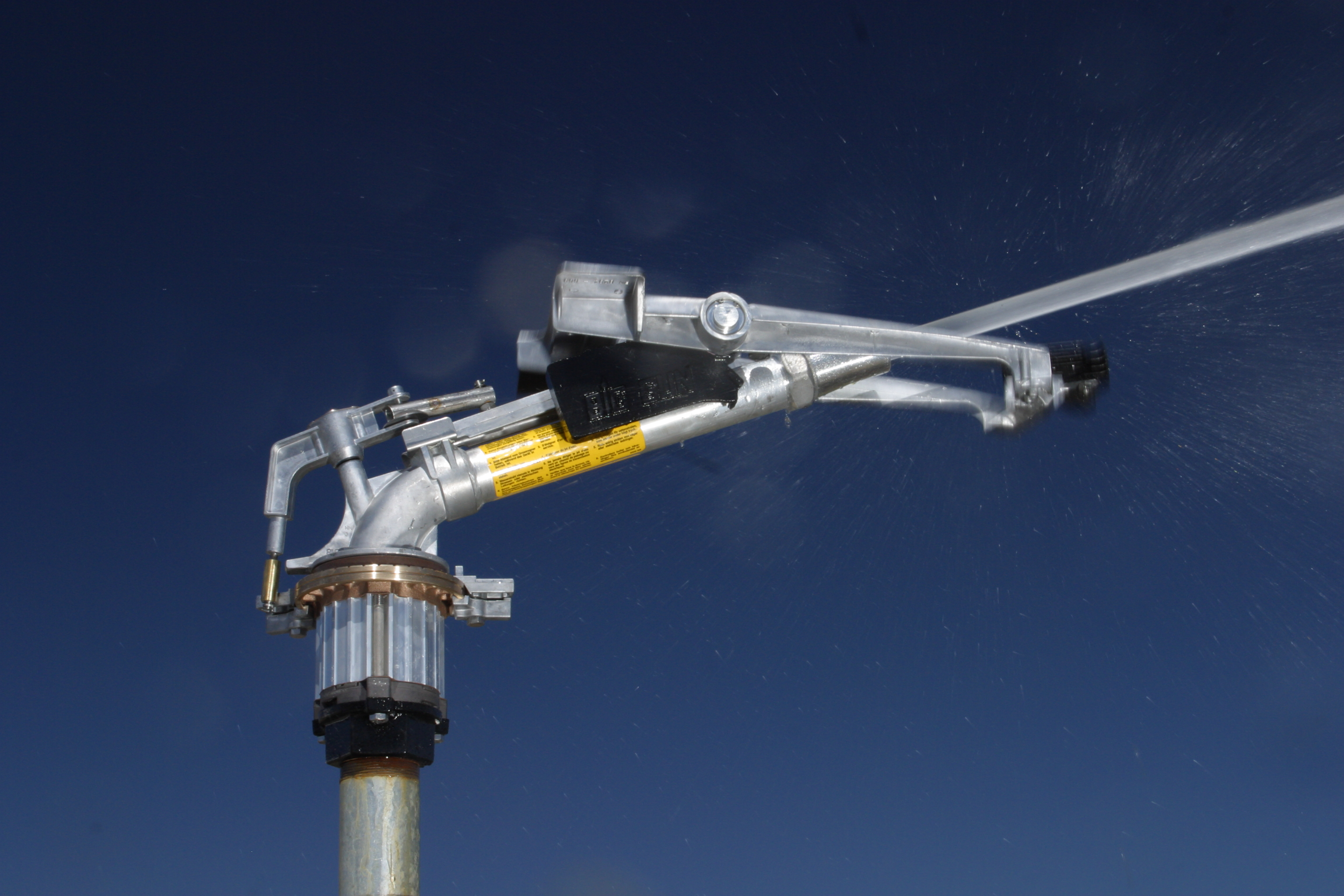
End-gun–style sprinkler

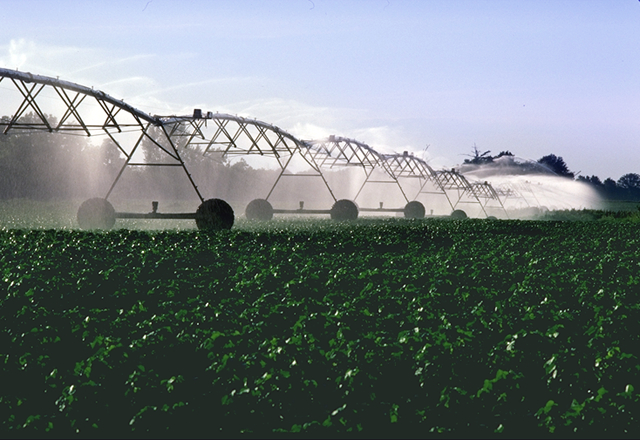
Irrigation on a cotton farm

The first use of sprinklers by farmers was some form of home and golf course type sprinklers. These ad hoc systems, while doing the job of the buried pipes and fixed sprinkler heads, interfered with cultivation and were expensive to maintain. Center-pivot irrigation was invented in 1940 by farmer Frank Zybach, who lived in Strasburg, Colorado. In the 1950s, Stout-Wyss Irrigation System, a firm based in Portland, Oregon, developed a rolling pipe type irrigation system for farms that has become the most popular type for farmers irrigating large fields. With this system, large wheels attached to the large pipes with sprinkler heads move slowly across the field.

== Underground ==
Underground sprinklers function through means of basic electronic and hydraulic technology. This valve and all of the sprinklers that will be activated by this valve are known as a zone. Upon activation, the solenoid, which sits on top of the valve is magnetized lifting a small stainless steel plunger in its center. By doing this, the activated (or raised) plunger allows water to escape from the top of a rubber diaphragm located in the center of the valve. Water that has been charged and waiting on the bottom of this same diaphragm now has the higher pressure and lifts the diaphragm. This pressurized water is then allowed to escape down stream of the valve through a series of pipes, usually made of PVC (higher pressure commercial systems) or polyethylene pipe (for typically lower pressure residential systems). At the end of these pipes and flush to ground level (typically) are pre measured and spaced out sprinklers. These sprinklers can be fixed spray heads that have a set pattern and generally spray between 1.5 and 2 m (5 and 7 ft), full rotating sprinklers that can spray a broken stream of water from 6 to 12 m (20 to 40 ft), or small drip emitters that release a slow, steady drip of water on more delicate plants such as flowers and shrubs. Use of indigenous materials also recommended.

== Health risks ==
In 2017, it was reported that use of common garden hoses in combination with spray nozzles may generate aerosols containing droplets smaller than 10 μm (0.39 mils), which can be inhaled by nearby people. Water stagnating in a hose between uses, especially when warmed by the sun, can host the growth and interaction of Legionella and free-living amoebae (FLA) as biofilms on the inner surface of the hose. Clinical cases of Legionnaires' disease or Pontiac fever have been found to be associated with inhalation of garden hose aerosols containing Legionella bacteria. The report provides measured microbial densities resulting from controlled hose conditions in order to quantify the human health risks. The densities of Legionella spp. identified in two types of hoses were found to be similar to those reported during legionellosis outbreaks from other causes. It has been proposed to mitigate the risk by draining hoses after use.

== Gallery ==
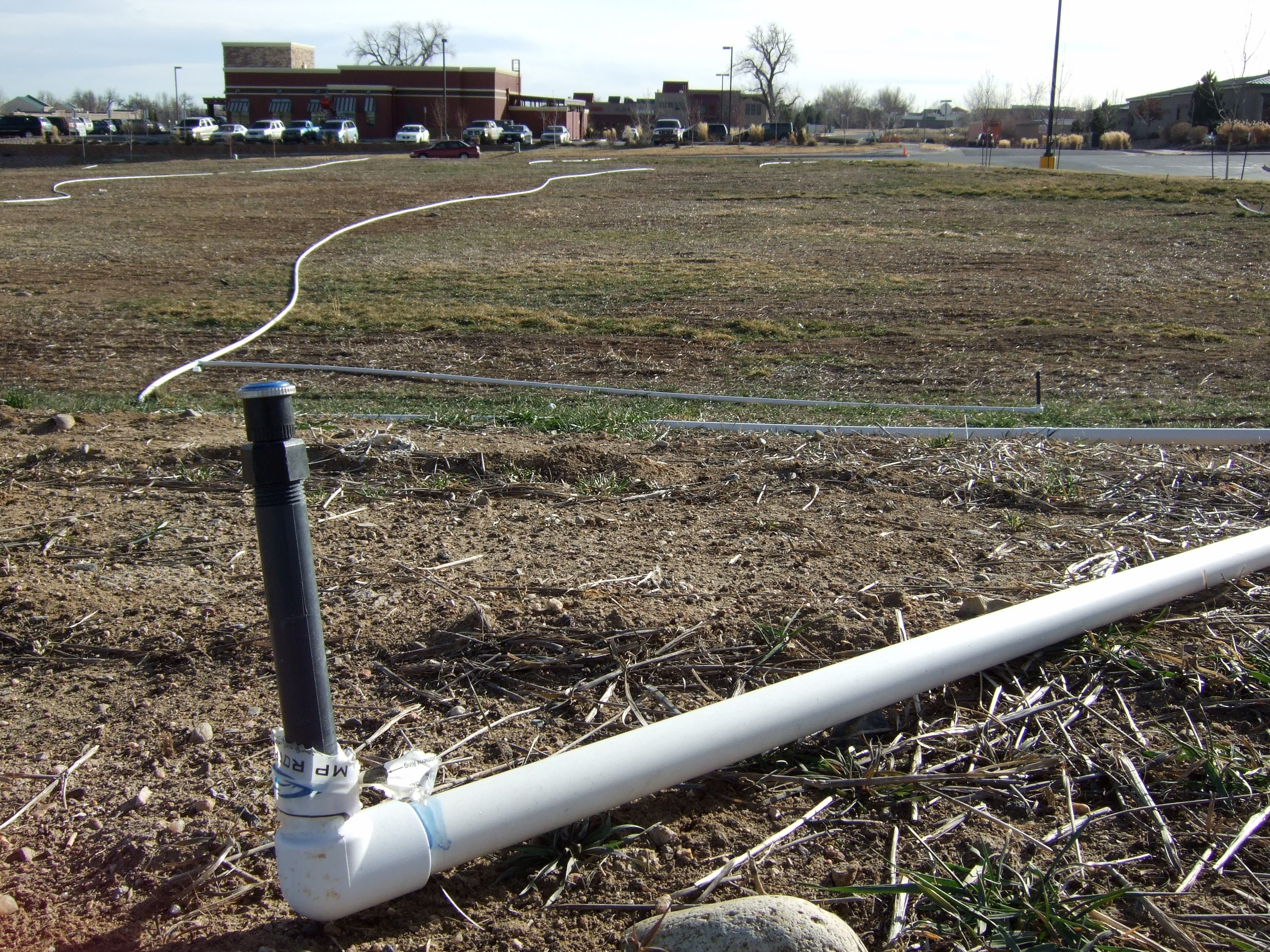
An underground sprinkler system about to be installed

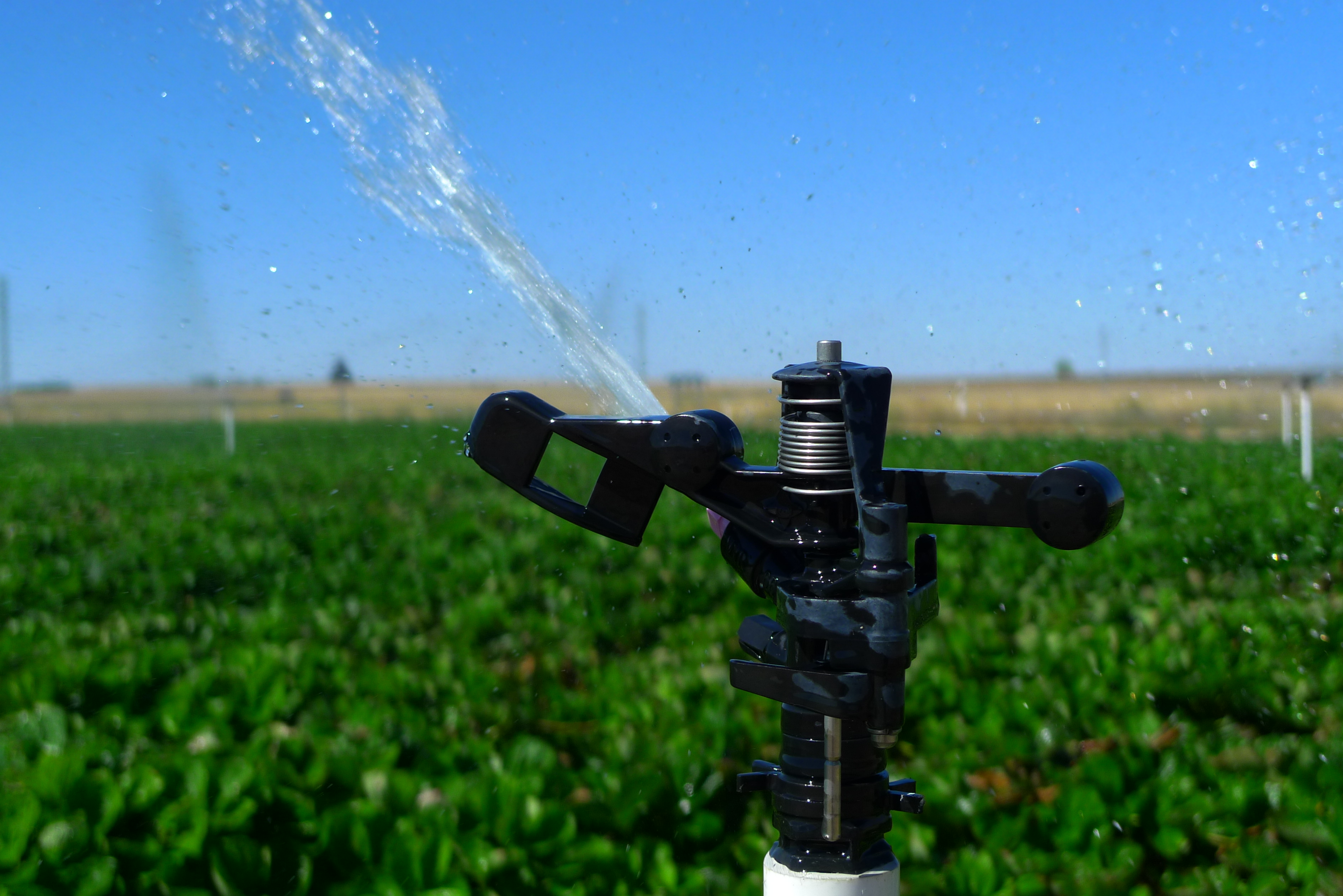
Impact sprinkler watering crops

Impact sprinkler in Bursa, Turkey

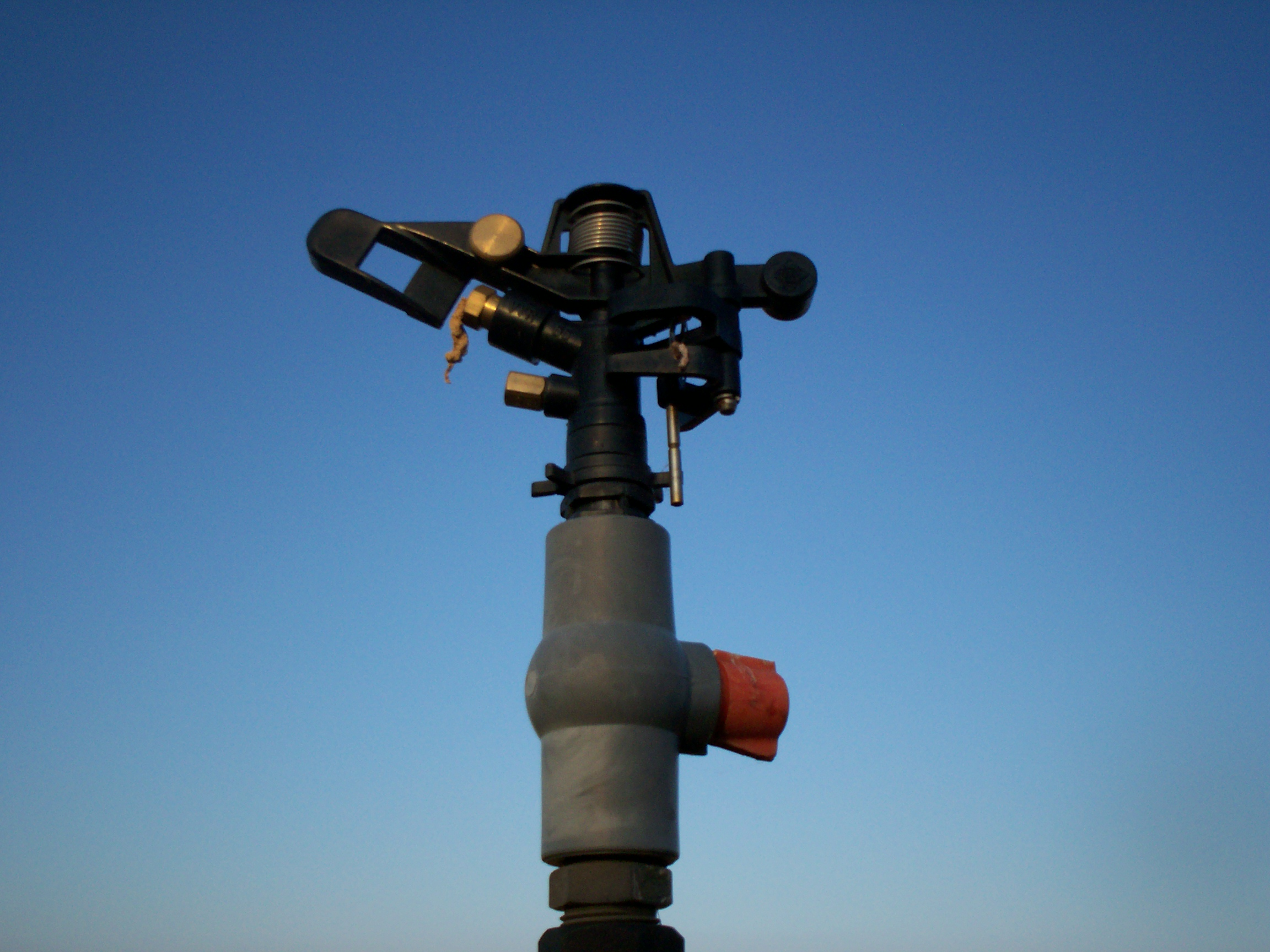
Impact sprinkler

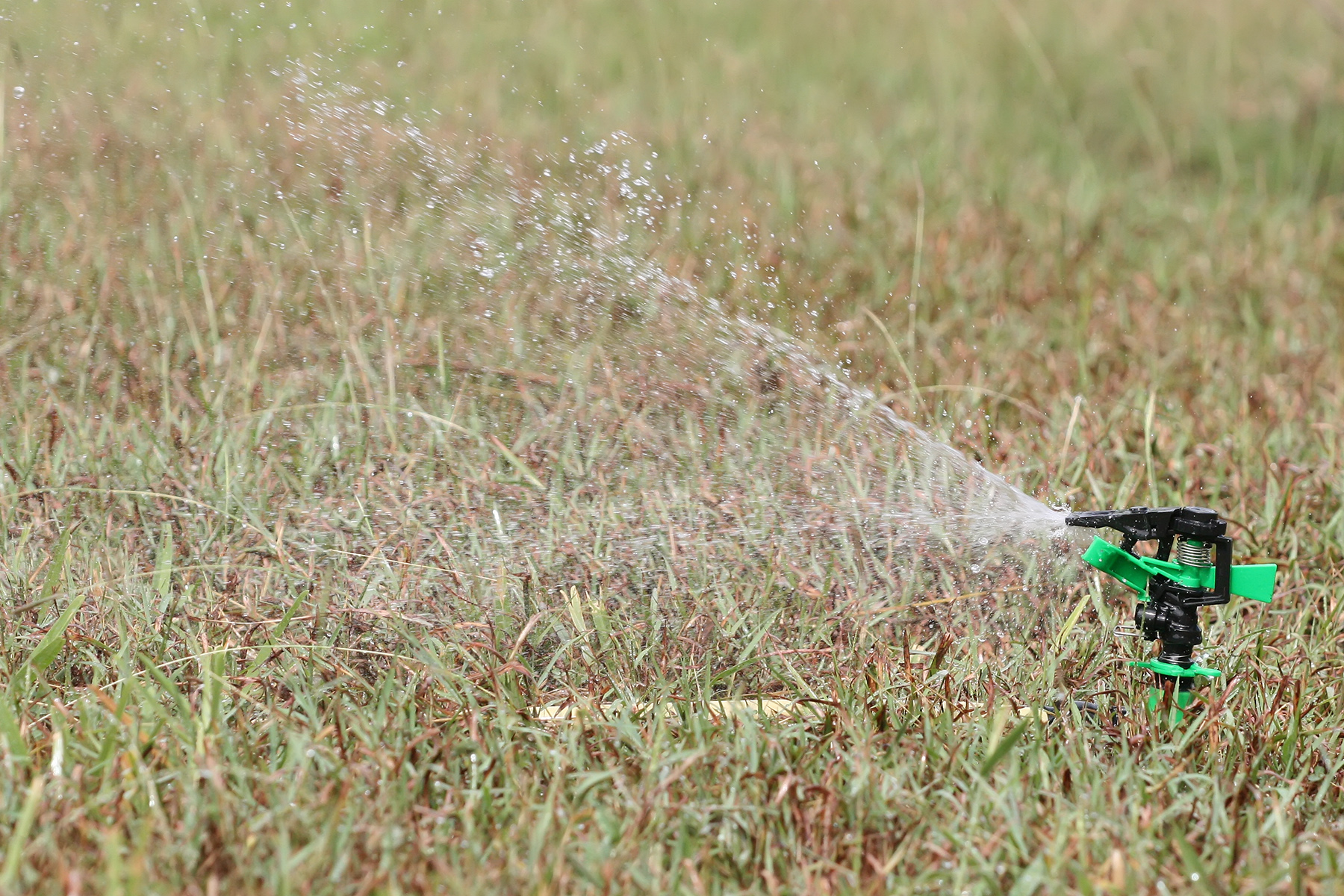
Small part-circle impact sprinkler for residential lawns

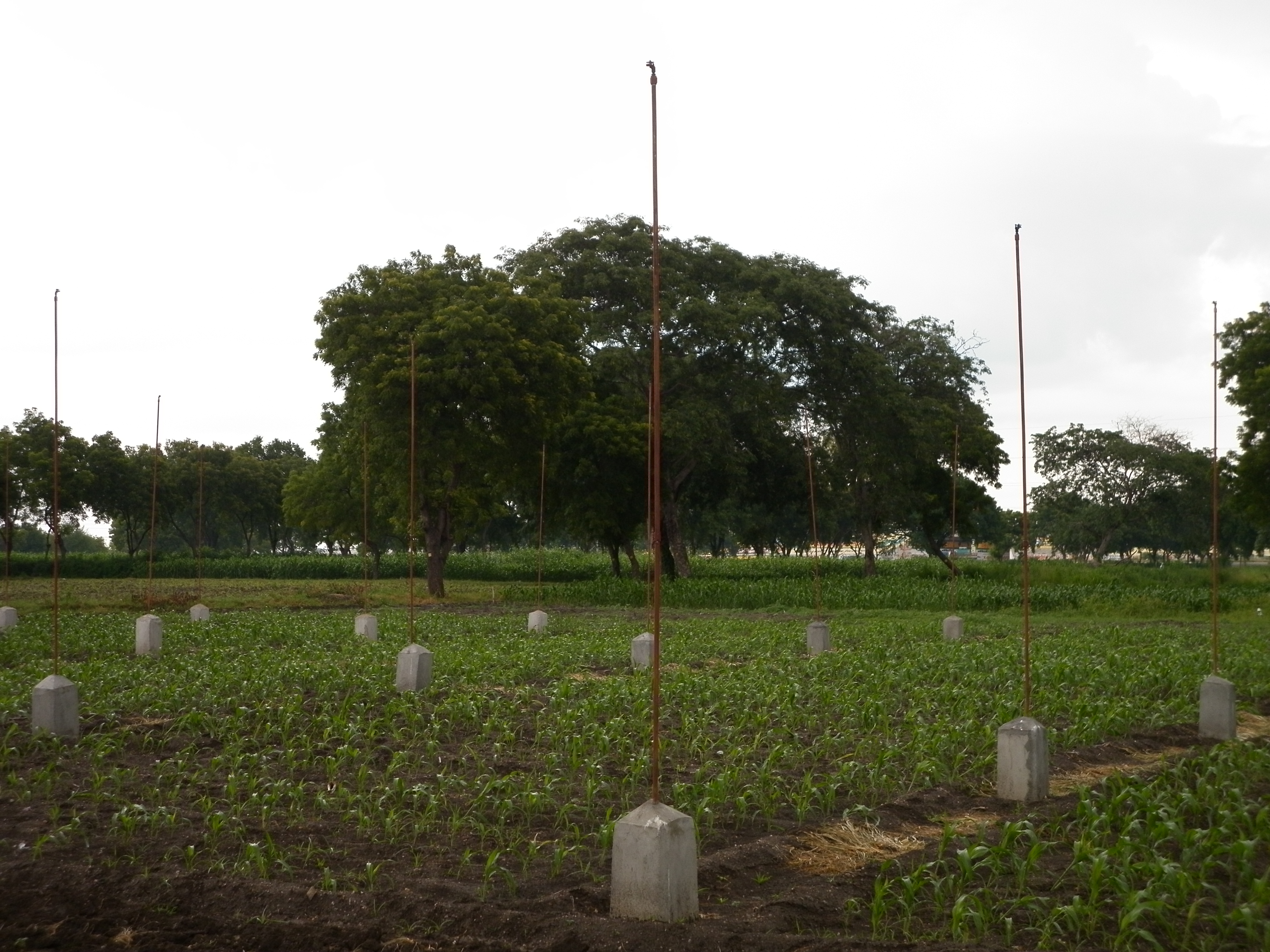
Overhead sprinkler

Impact sprinkler in action

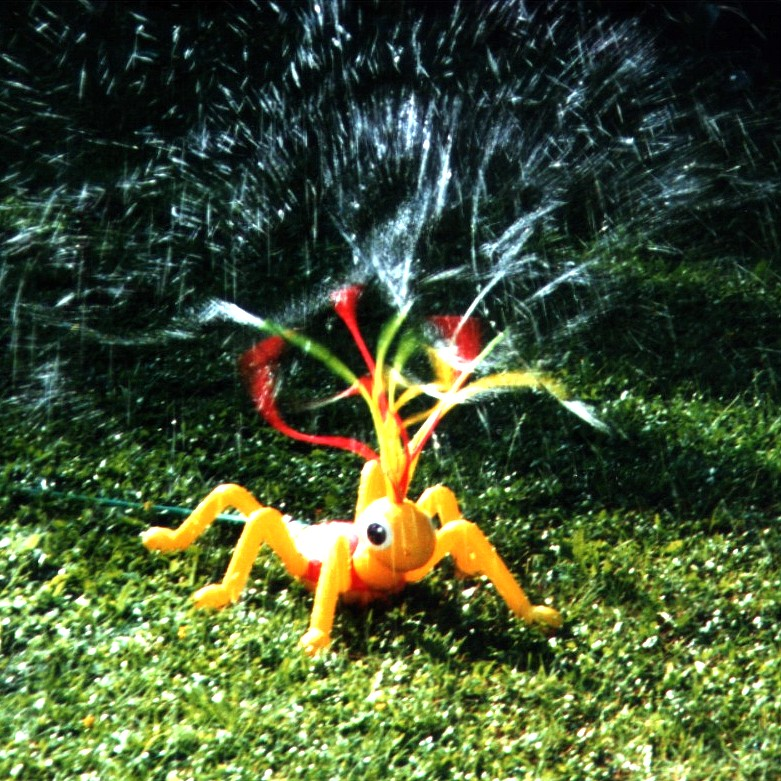
Sprinkler for children

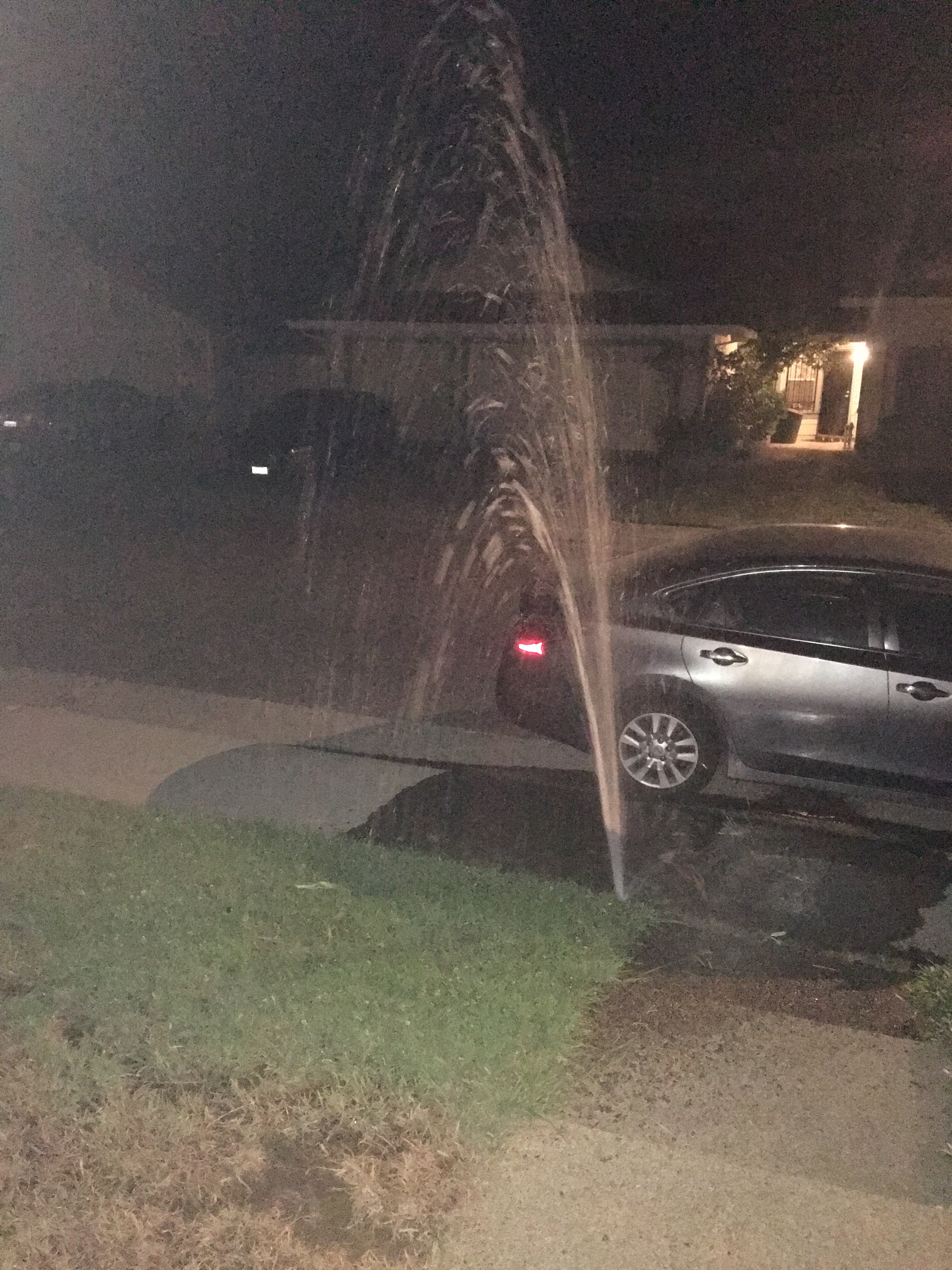
A faulty lawn sprinkler

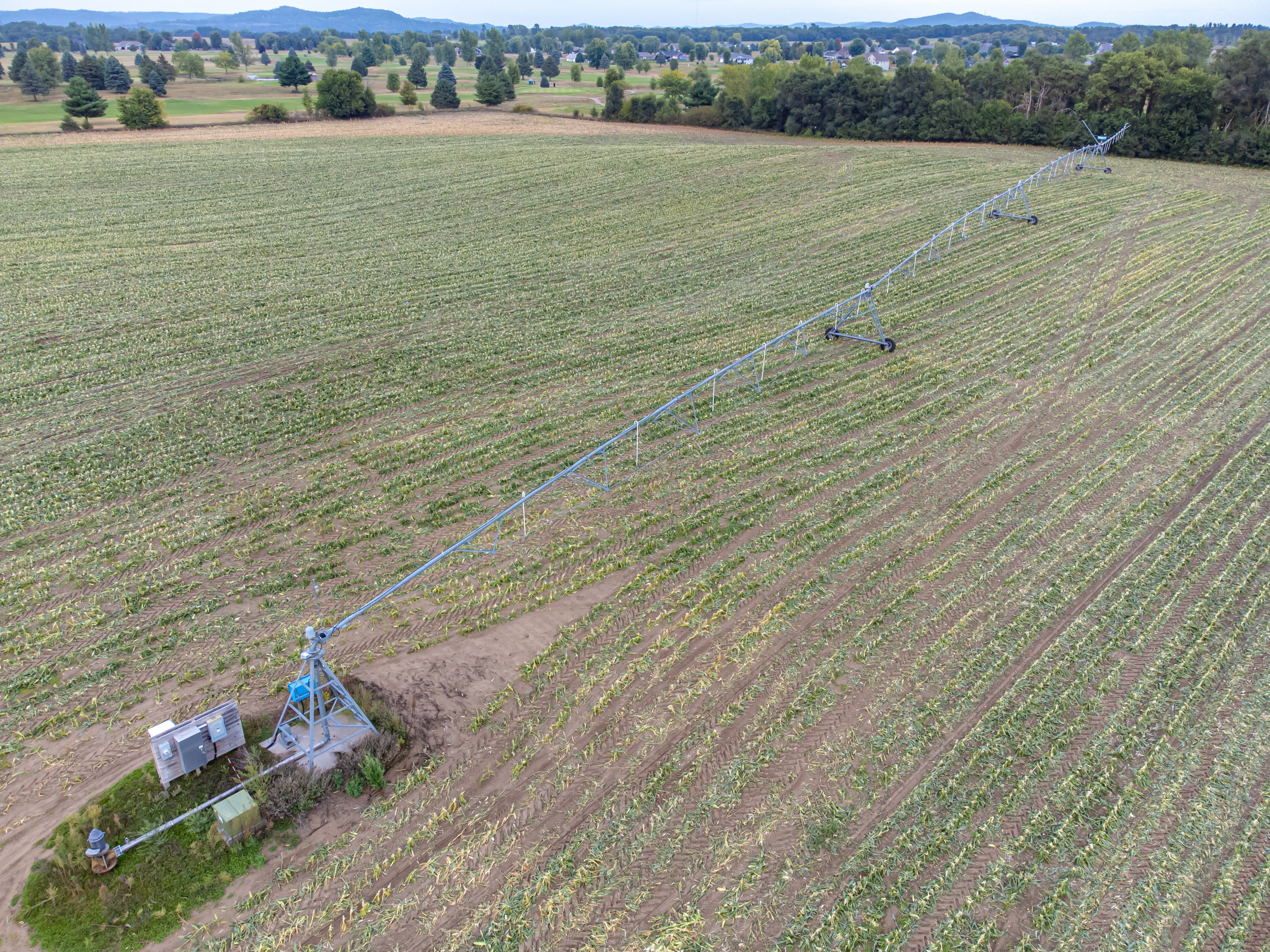
Irrigation sprinkler in a crop field

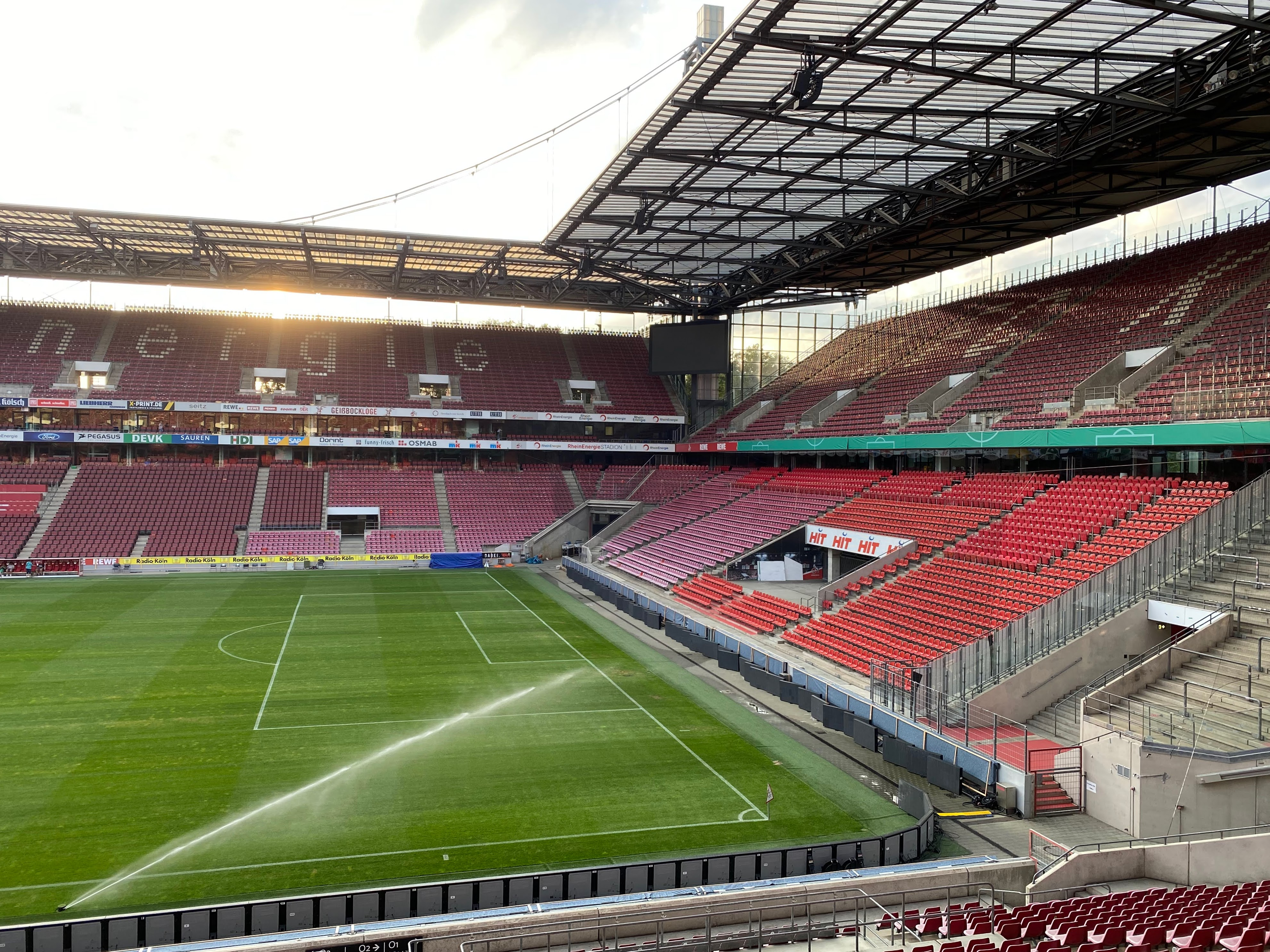
Irrigation sprinkler in a football stadium

== See also ==
- Drip irrigation
- Feynman sprinkler
- Irrigation
- Sprinkler system timer
