= Rain Bird =

American irrigation supplies manufacturer

Rain Bird Corporation
- Rain bird logo
- Company type: Private
- Industry: Manufacturing
- Founded: 1933
- Founder: Clement LaFetra
- Headquarters: Azusa, California, US
- Key people: Michael L. Donoghue, CEO
- Products: Irrigation Products
- Website: rainbird.com

Rain Bird Corporation is an international privately held manufacturer and provider of irrigation products and services for landscapes, golf courses, sports fields, and agriculture which are designed to minimize water consumption. The firm is headquartered in Azusa, California, with offices and manufacturing facilities in Tucson, Arizona; Steele, Alabama; Tijuana Mexico; France; and China. Rain Bird sells more than 4,000 products and services in over 130 countries.

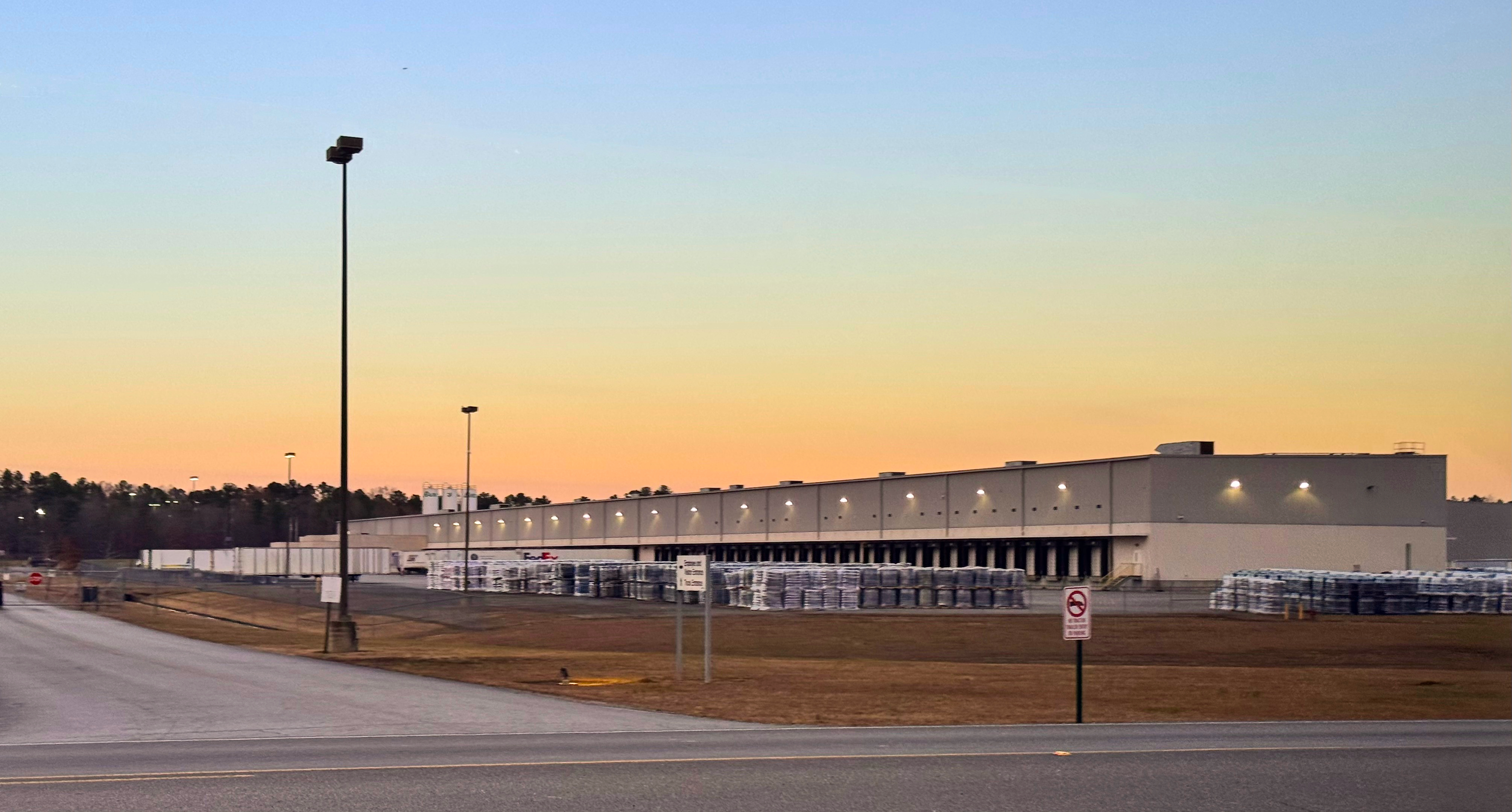
Rain Bird facility in Steele, Alabama

== History ==
Rain Bird had its origins in 1933 when Glendora, California, citrus grower Orton Englehart developed the first prototype of the horizontal action impact sprinkler. This new design offered slow rotation and more efficient watering than other sprinklers of that era, features that were long sought after by local irrigators. Orton's neighbor Clement LaFetra began helping him build and market the sprinklers, and they urged him to patent the invention. U.S. patent 1,997,901 was awarded on April 16, 1935. Englehart preferred farming, so in 1935, he sold the business to Clement and Mary Elizabeth LaFetra. Clem LaFetra died in 1963 and his wife Mary "Betty" LaFetra became the second CEO of Rain Bird Corporation. Under her leadership, the company became global. She was CEO until 1978 when her son, Anthony La Fetra, became CEO. Antony La Fetra ran the company until his death in 2021. At that time, Art Ludwick was named interim CEO, and in February 2022, Mike Donoghue was named President and CEO.

The name Rain Bird was taken from the Native American legend of a bird that brought rain, in reference to the bird-like appearance of the impact sprinkler in action. Since its beginnings, the firm has offered irrigation products for farms, golf courses, sports arenas, commercial developments, and residential landscapes. Rain Bird has obtained over 450 patents since its founding.

== Recognition ==
The Rain Bird horizontal action impact-drive sprinkler head was recognized as a historic landmark of agricultural engineering in 1990 by the American Society of Agricultural and Biological Engineers. This invention led to sprinkler irrigation development that currently exceeds 50,000,000 acres (78,000 sq mi; 200,000 km^{2}) worldwide.

In 2015, the firm was recognized by National Business Research Institute with its prestigious Circle of Excellence award, based upon its outstanding employee engagement.
