= List of people from Houston =

This is a list of people who were born, were raised, or have lived in Houston, Texas.

== Entertainment, arts, and media personalities ==
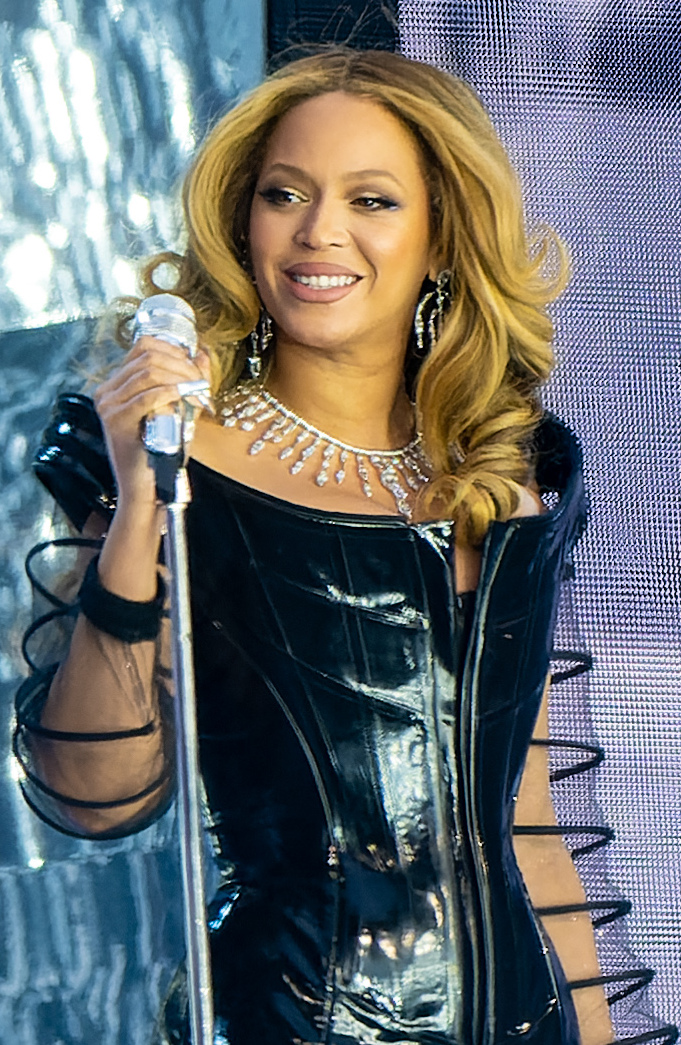
Beyoncé

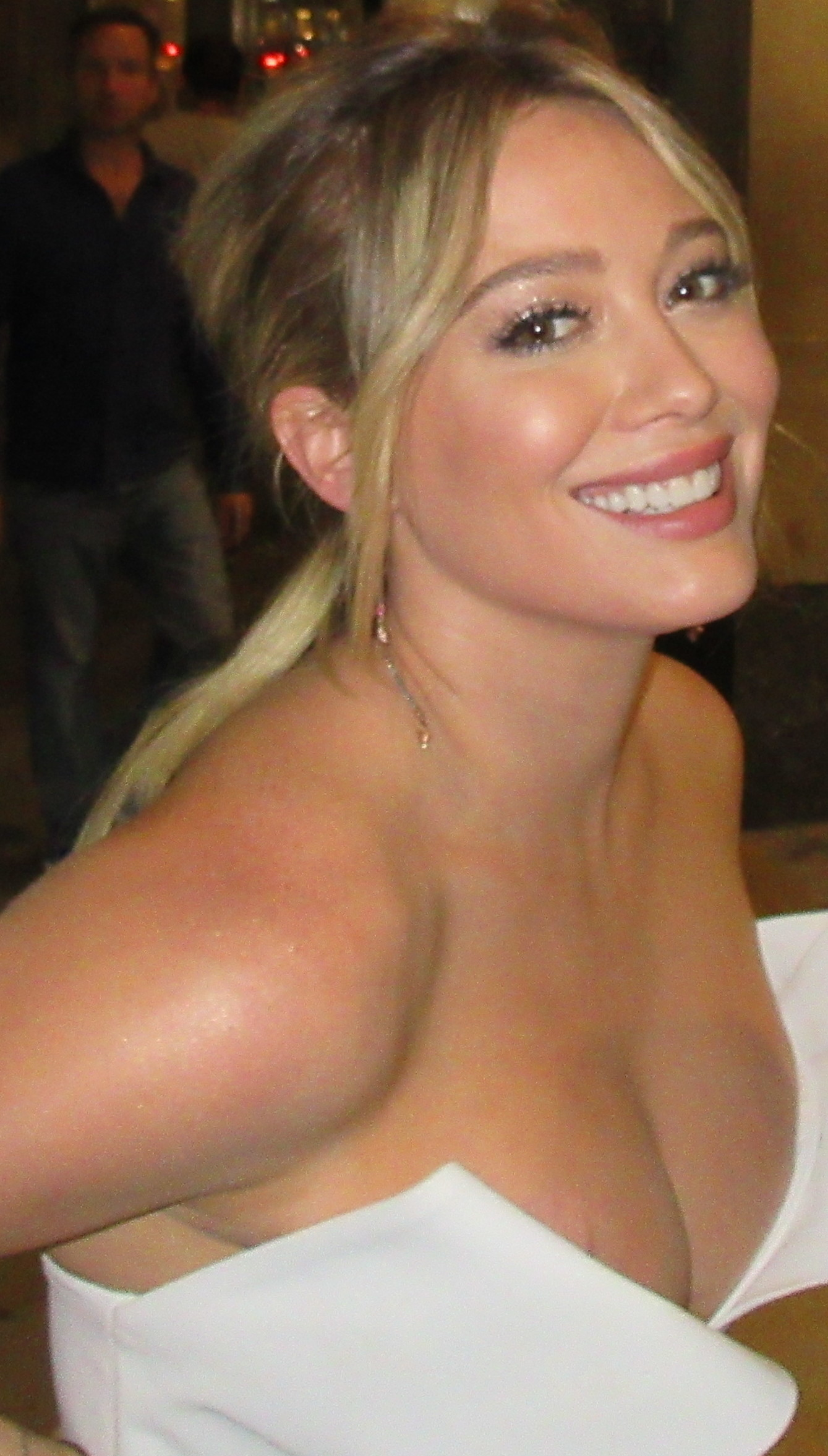
Hilary Duff

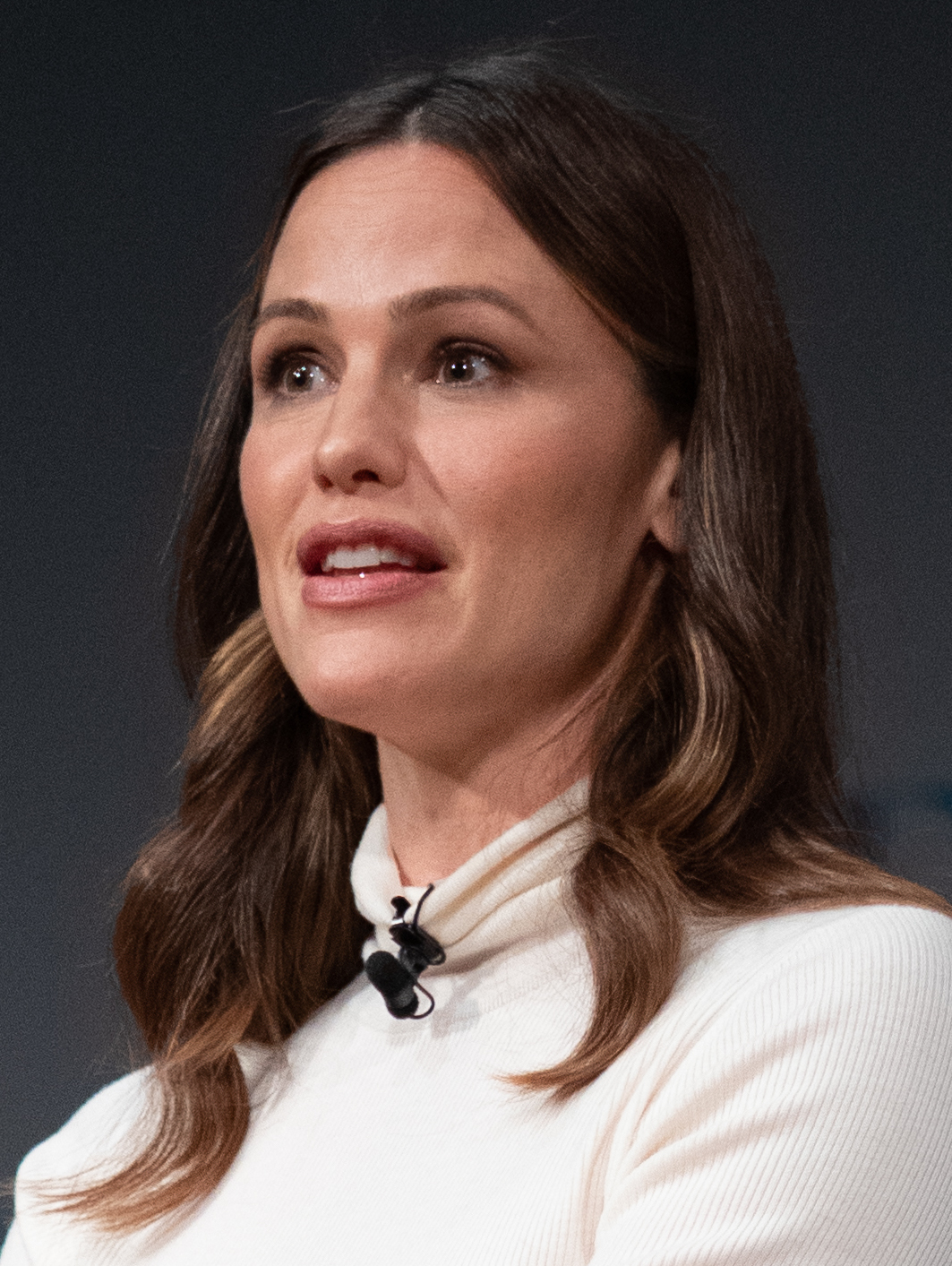
Jennifer Garner

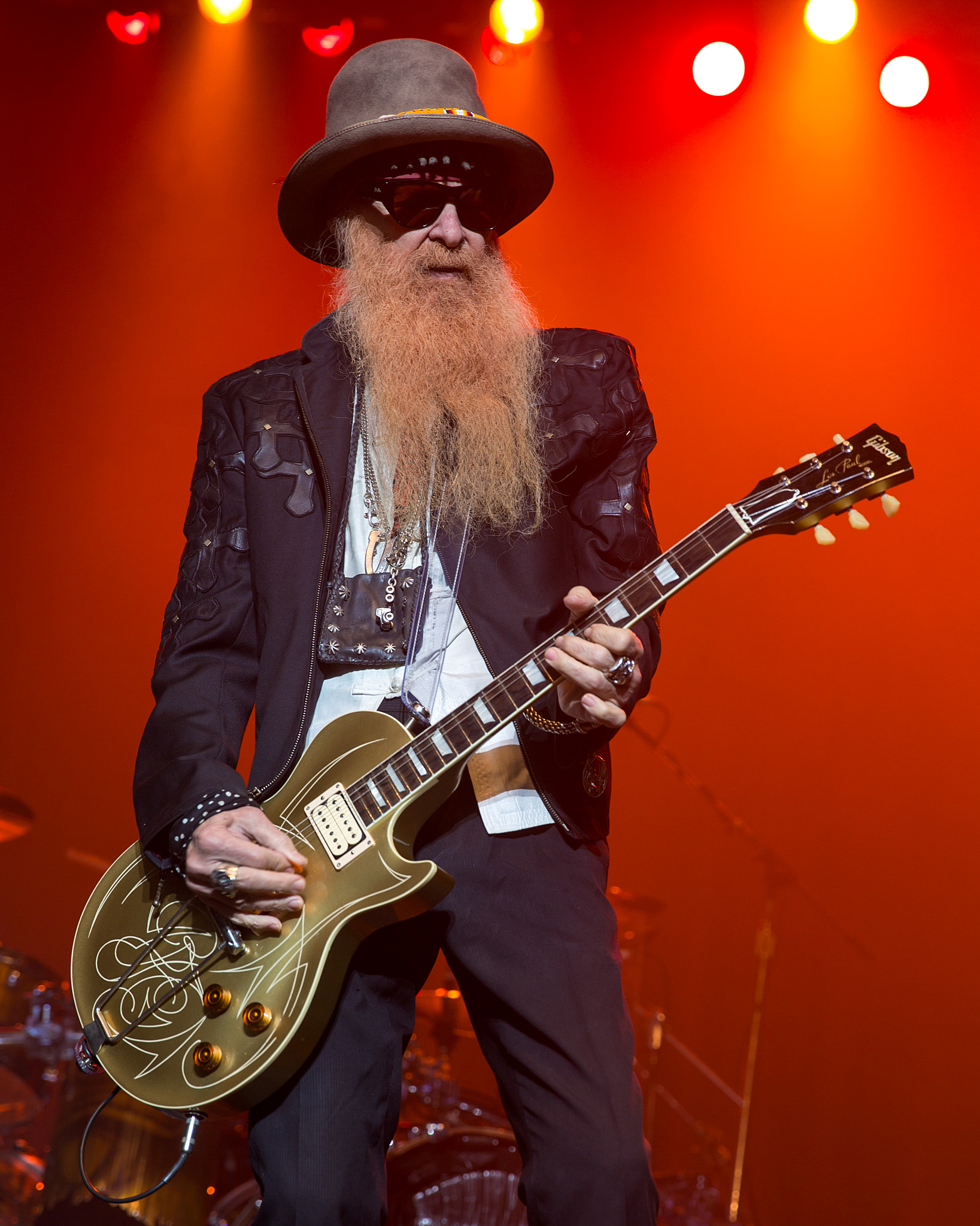
Billy Gibbons

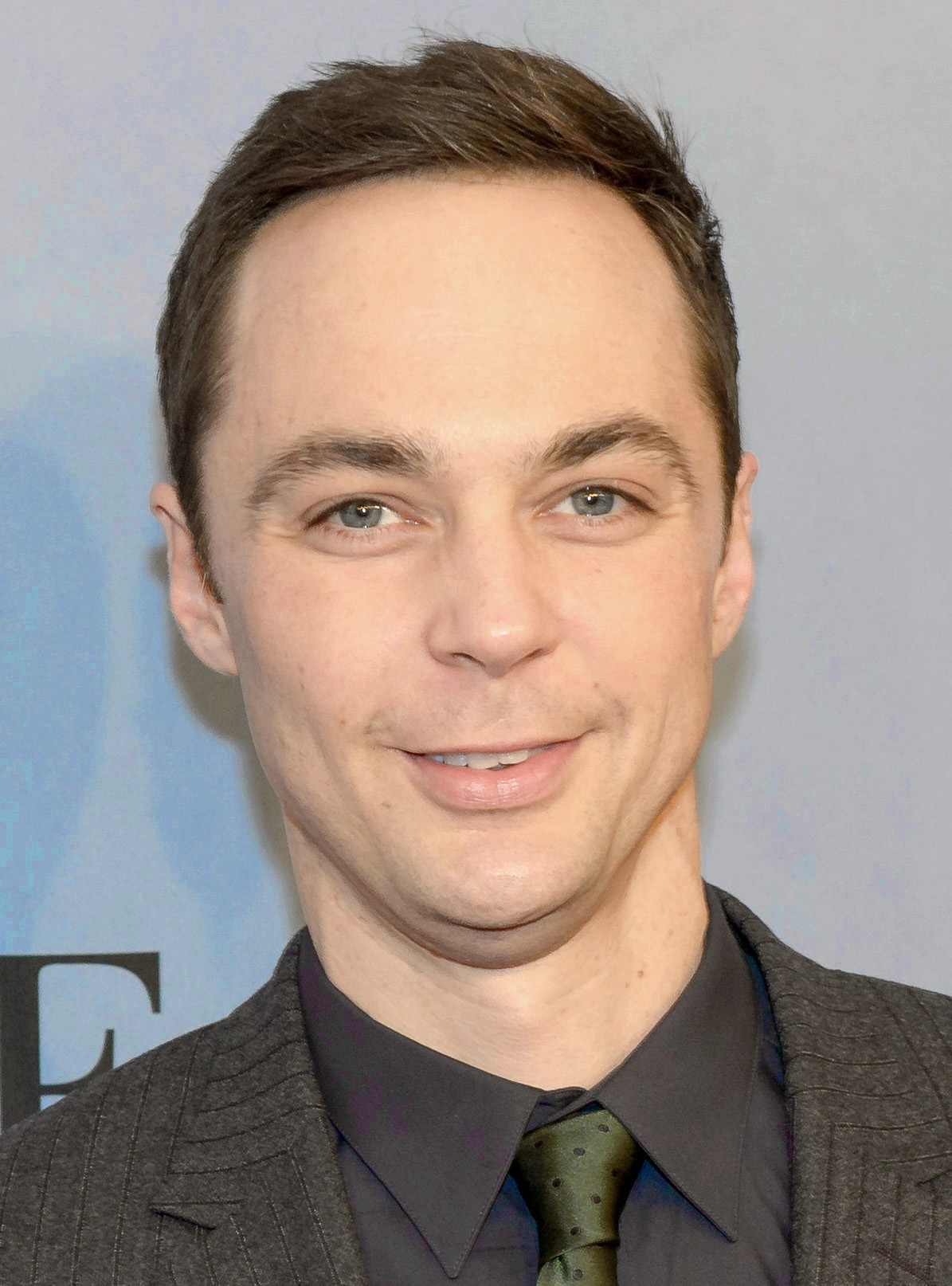
Jim Parsons

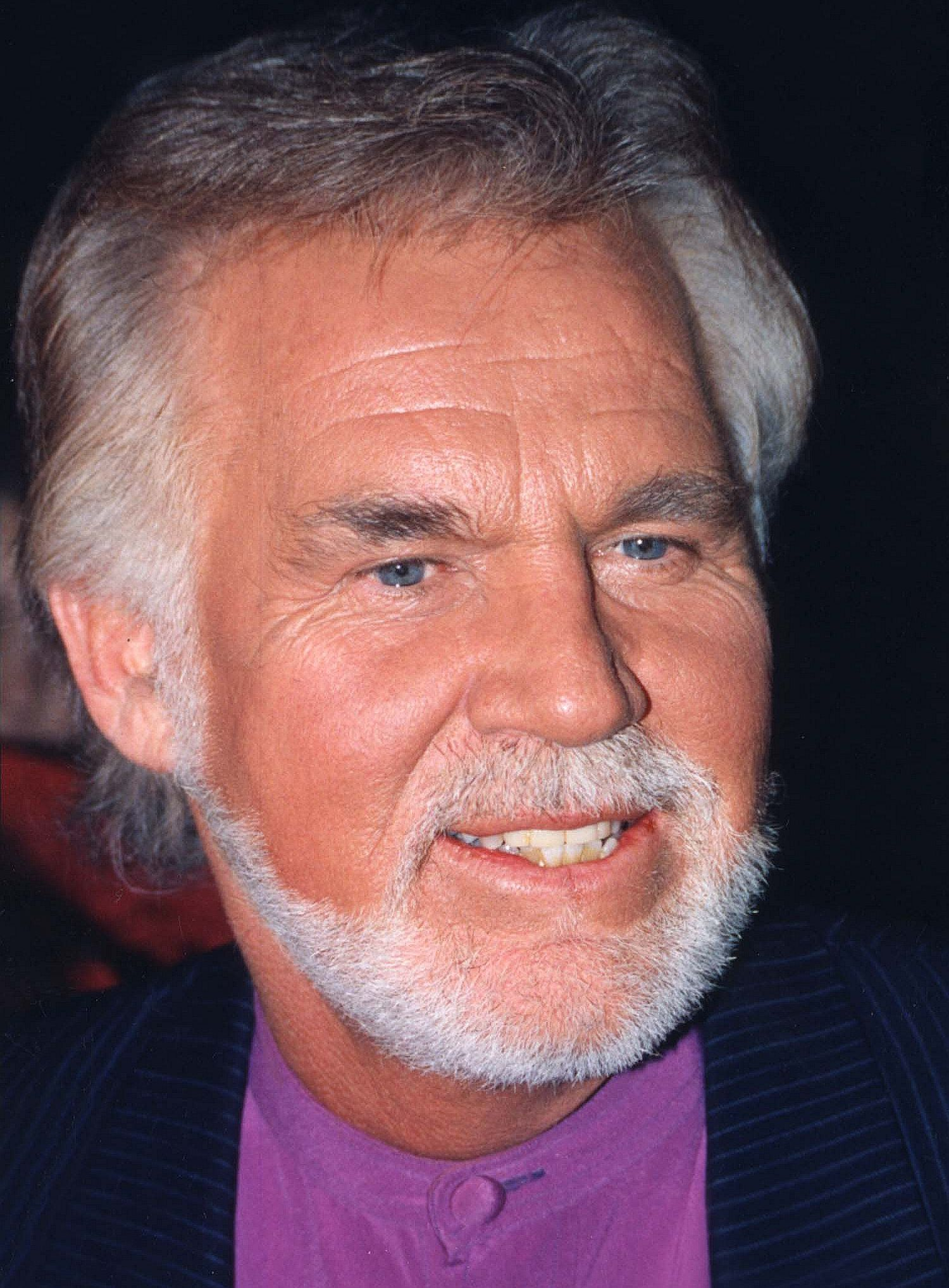
Kenny Rogers

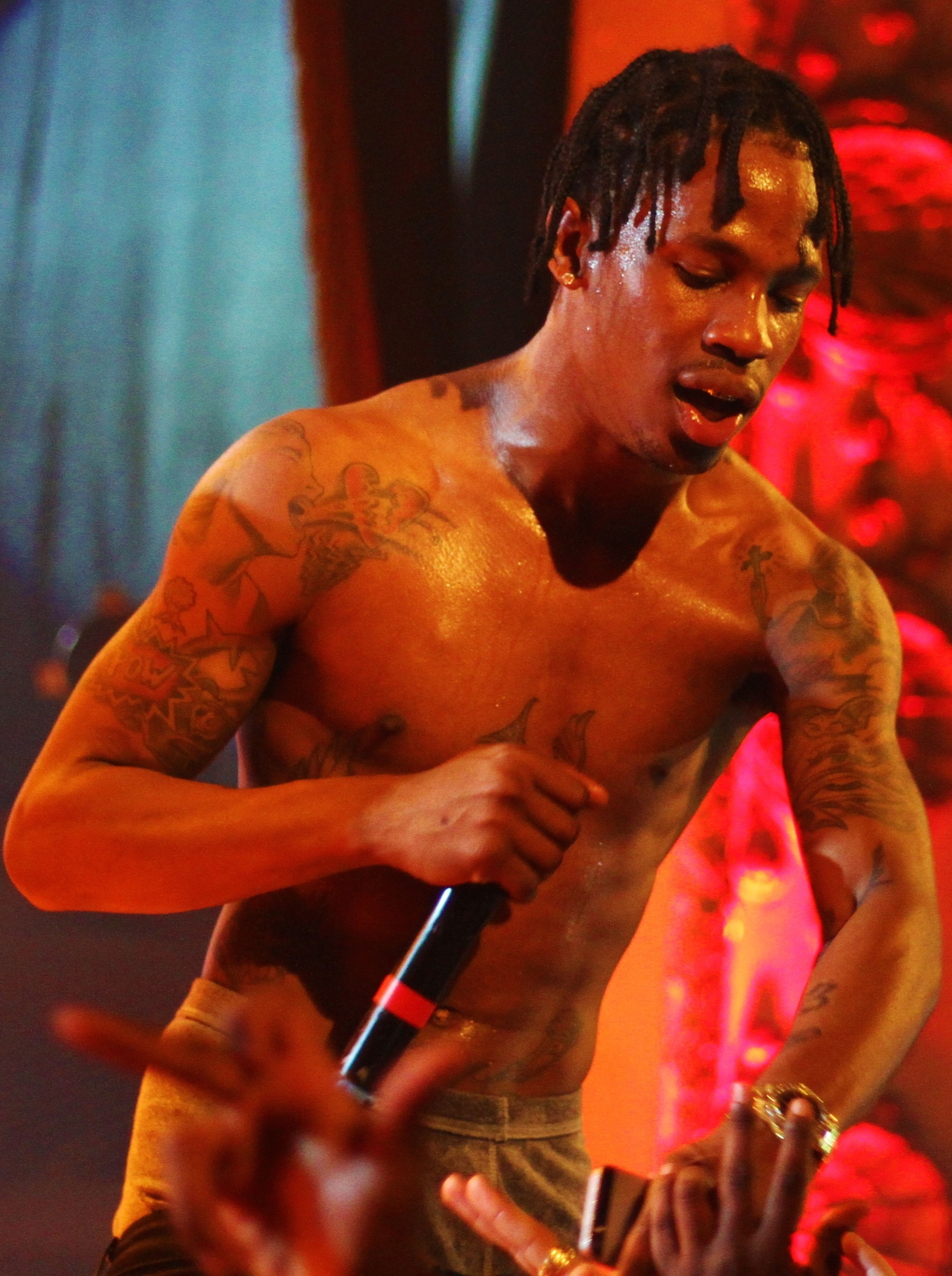
Travis Scott

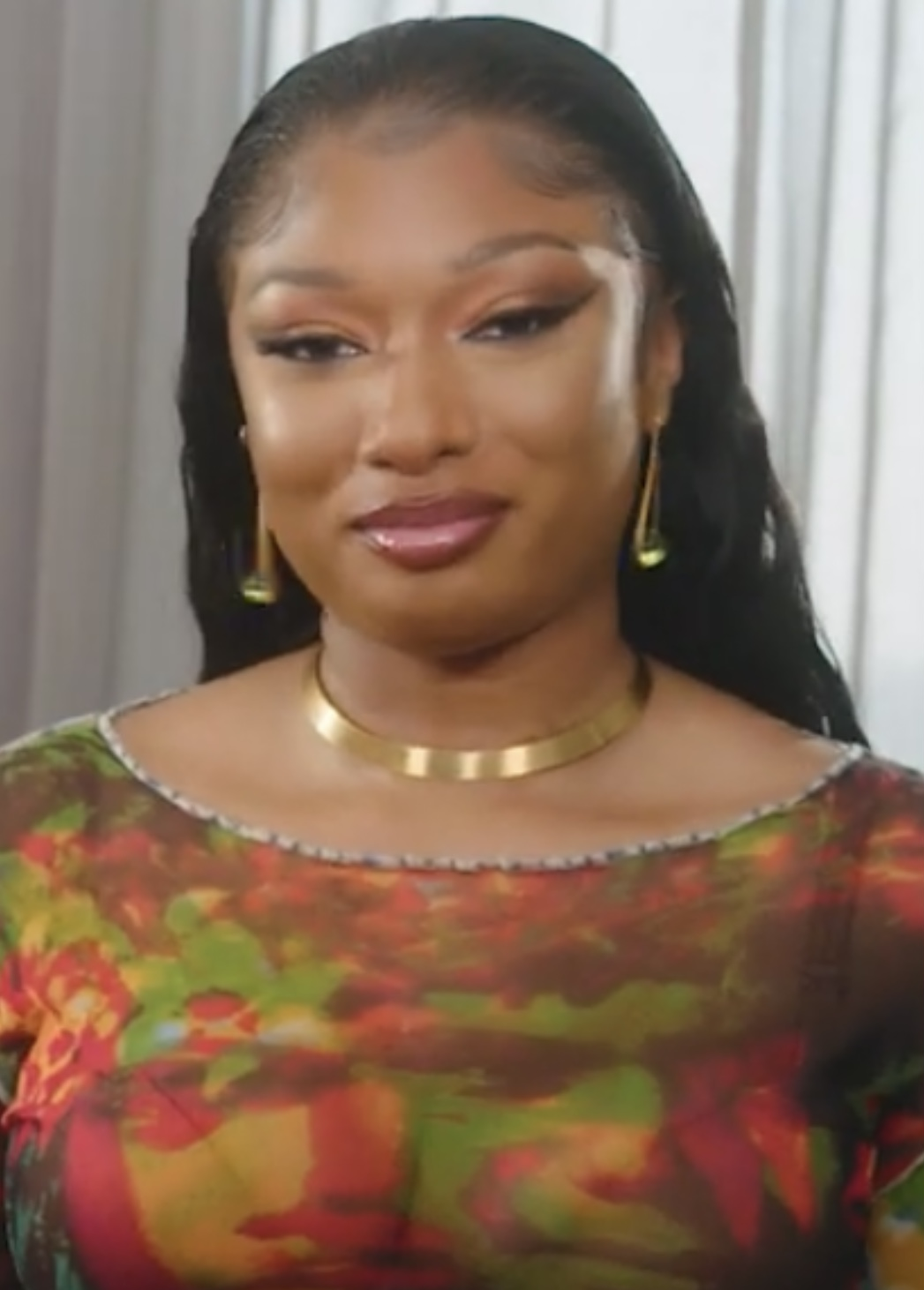
Megan Thee Stallion

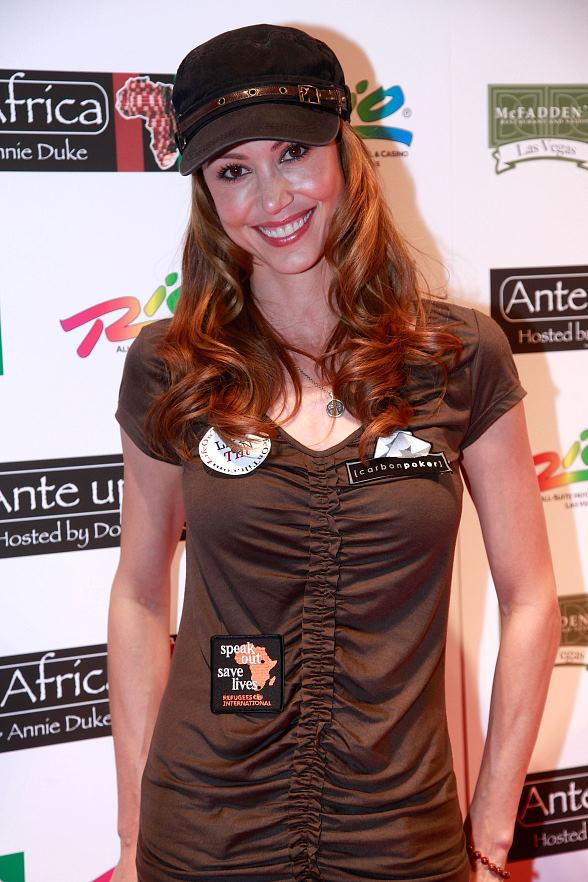
Shannon Elizabeth

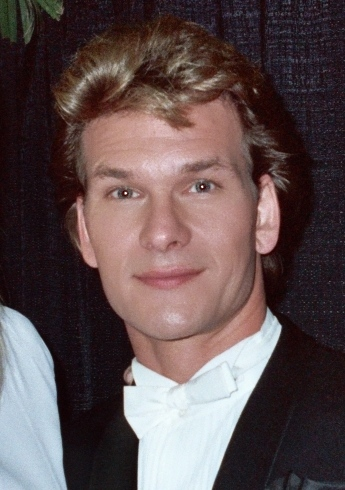
Patrick Swayze

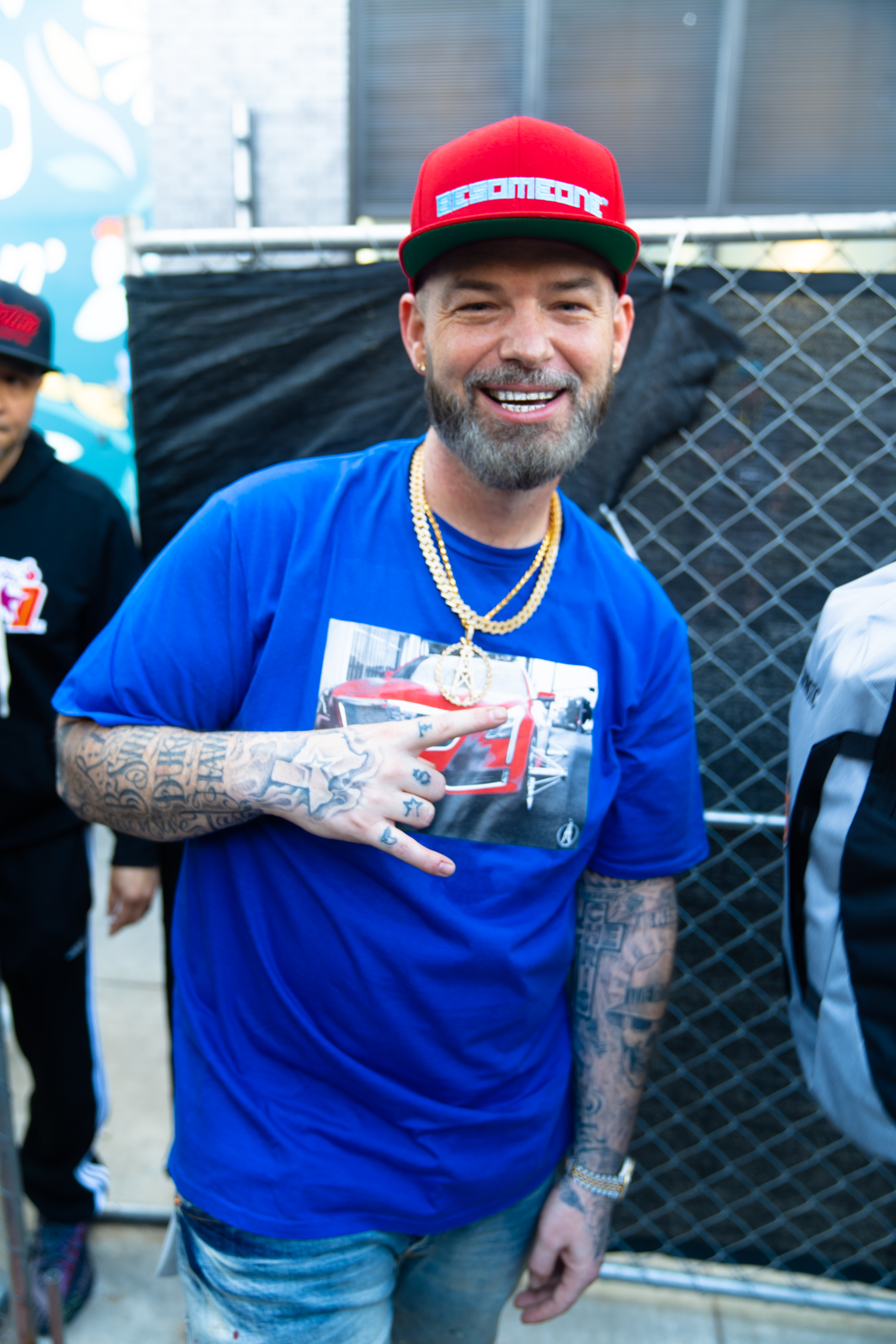
Paul Wall

- Debbie Allen, choreographer, actress
- Lauren Anderson, ballet dancer
- Wes Anderson, film director
- Archie Bell and the Drells, soul/R&B music group
- Mark Ballas, ballroom dancer and choreographer from Dancing with the Stars, actor, singer-songwriter and musician (member of duo Alexander Jean)
- Kirko Bangz, rapper
- Michelle Barnes, artist and arts administrator
- Donald Barthelme, journalist (deceased)
- Skye McCole Bartusiak, actress (deceased)
- Baby Bash, rapper
- Texas Battle, actor
- Frank Beard, percussionist for ZZ Top
- Jeff Bennett, voice actor
- Melissa Benoist, actress
- Michael Berry, from Orange, lawyer and radio talk show host
- Beyoncé, singer, songwriter, producer and actress
- Clint Black, musician
- Lisa Hartman Black, singer and actress
- B L A C K I E (born Michael LaCour), rapper
- Alexis Bledel, actress
- Maggie Blye, actress (deceased)
- Craig Bohmler, composer
- Matt Bomer, from Spring, actor
- Danielle Bradbery, from Cypress, Texas, season 4 winner of The Voice
- Berkeley Breathed, born in California, cartoonist
- Jonathan Breck, actor, best known as The Creeper in Jeepers Creepers
- Josh Brener, actor
- Mistress Isabelle Brooks, drag performer
- Jean Brooks, actress (deceased)
- Karamo Brown, television personality and activist
- William Broyles Jr., screenwriter
- Bun B, rapper, one half of the rap duo UGK (Underground Kingz), raised in Houston
- Ingrid Burley, rapper and songwriter
- Johnny Bush, country singer (deceased)
- William Butler, born in California; raised in The Woodlands; musician
- Win Butler, born in California; raised in The Woodlands
- Christian de la Campa, actor telenovela and model
- Peter Cambor, actor
- Chandler Canterbury, actor
- Jonathan Caouette, filmmaker
- Richelle Carey, newscaster
- Kathryn Casey, non-fiction author and mystery novelist
- Scott Cawthon, former video game developer, creator of the Five Nights at Freddy's series
- Chamillionaire (born Hakeem Seriki), rapper
- Nicholas Alexander Chavez, actor
- Lois Chiles, actress
- Imani Chyle, singer-songwriter and rapper
- Lynn Collins, actress
- Chedda Da Connect, rapper
- Dan Cook, sportswriter (deceased)
- Henry G. Sanders, actor
- Peter James Cooper, screenwriter, film producer and businessman
- Nichole Cordova, singer for girl group Girlicious
- Walter Cronkite, television journalist (deceased)
- Rodney Crowell, musician
- Peter Brett Cullen, actor
- Willie D, rapper
- D4vd (born David Anthony Burke), rapper
- Trevor Daniel, singer
- Alexandria DeBerry, actress
- Loretta Devine, actress
- DhoomBros, YouTube personalities, actors, dancers, entertainers, and DJs
- Ryan Donowho, actor and musician
- Allen Drury, author (deceased)
- Haylie Duff, actress
- Hilary Duff, actress and singer
- Shelley Duvall, actress (deceased)
- Rama Duwaji, animator, illustrator, and ceramist; first lady of New York City
- Melvin Edwards, sculptor
- Ike Eisenmann, sound effects
- Dorian Electra, singer
- Shannon Elizabeth, actress
- Robert Ellis, country singer
- Terry Ellis, singer for R&B girl group En Vogue
- Kelly Emberg, model
- Sean Faris, actor
- Fenix TX, band
- Ashley Fink, actress of Glee
- Suzanne Finstad, author
- Will Flanary, ophthalmologist and comedian
- Sean Patrick Flanery, actor; from Sugar Land
- Mark Flood, artist
- Tom Ford, designer
- A. J. Foyt, auto racer
- Justin Furstenfeld
- Jennifer Garner, born in Houston; raised in Charleston, West Virginia; actress
- Greg Germann, actor
- Geto Boys members
- Billy Gibbons, guitarist and singer for ZZ Top
- Robert Glasper, musician
- Glen Gondo, founder of the Japan Festival (deceased)
- Olivia Gonzales, dancer
- R.W. Hampton, singer
- Lisa Hartman, actress
- Allison Harvard, model, artist, actress and Internet celebrity
- Bill Hicks, comedian (deceased)
- Dusty Hill, bassist and singer for ZZ Top (deceased)
- Ian Hill, drag performer
- Jay Hooks, blues musician
- Larry Hovis, actor (deceased)
- Irene the Alien, drag performer
- Molly Ivins, journalist (deceased)
- Cassandra Jean, actress, model
- Mickey Jones, musician (deceased)
- Mike Jones, rapper
- Nicky Jones, voice actor
- Bradley Jordan, rapper
- Robert Earl Keen, singer
- Ruth Kelley, one of the first women to fly to Antarctica
- Keshi, singer
- Candice King, actress and singer
- Awsten Knight, musician
- Solange Knowles, singer and songwriter
- Liza Koshy, actress and YouTube personality
- Tony Labrusca, actor
- Eric Ladin, actor
- Hubert Laws, jazz musician
- Johnny Lee, singer
- Richard Linklater, film director
- Lizzo, singer
- Lyle Lovett, from Klein, musician and actor
- Todd Lowe, actor
- Mark Lowry, southern gospel vocalist, songwriter and comedian, formerly sang with the Gaither Vocal Band
- LeToya Luckett, singer
- Machine Gun Kelly, singer, rapper, and actor born in Houston
- Debra Maffett, Miss America 1983
- Barbara Mandrell, singer
- David Matranga, voice actor
- Ayanna Jolivet McCloud, visual artist
- Maxine Mesinger, columnist (deceased)
- Angelbert Metoyer, artist
- Mineral (band), emo-rock band
- Mitchelle'l, singer-songwriter
- Farrah Moan, drag queen and entertainer
- Jason Moore, Wikipedia editor and organizer
- Lecrae Moore, Christian rapper, co-founder of Reach Records
- Jason Moran, pianist
- Cory Morrow, country singer
- Johnny Nash, singer (deceased)
- Edwin Neal, actor
- Michael Nesmith, musician, singer for The Monkees (deceased)
- Iceman Nick, jeweler and jewelry designer
- Renee O'Connor, actress
- Odetari (born Taha Othman Ahmad), singer and rapper
- Mary-Jean O'Doherty, opera singer
- Tony Oller, actor
- Annette O'Toole, actress
- Jim Parsons, actor
- David Phelps, Christian singer
- DJ Premier (born Christopher Edward Martin)
- Billy Preston, keyboardist, and singer (deceased)
- James Prince, CEO and music executive of Rap-A-Lot
- P. J. Proby, singer
- Dennis Quaid, actor
- Randy Quaid, actor
- Leven Rambin, actress
- Cierra Ramirez, actress
- Phylicia Rashad, actress
- Dan Rather, from Wharton, television journalist
- Stevie Ray, professional wrestler
- Oyibo Rebel, musician and actor
- Prudencesa Renfro, singer
- Riff Raff (born Horst Christian Simco), rapper
- LaTavia Roberson, singer
- Charlie Robinson, actor (deceased)
- Charlie Robison, singer (deceased)
- Kenny Rogers, singer (deceased)
- Kelly Rowland, singer
- Joshua Rush, actor
- Sapnap, Youtuber
- Scarface (born Brad Terrence Jordan)
- Travis Scott, Grammy-nominated artist, rapper, singer, songwriter, producer
- DJ Screw (born Robert Earl Davis, Jr.) (deceased)
- San Kim Sean, martial artist (deceased)
- Joan Severance, actress
- Guitar Shorty (deceased)
- Kaitlyn Siragusa, internet personality
- Anna Nicole Smith, born in Houston; raised in Mexia, model and actress (deceased)
- Jaclyn Smith, actress
- South Park Mexican (born Carlos Coy)
- Brent Spiner, actor
- Megan Thee Stallion, rapper
- Matt Stone, co-creator of South Park
- Patrick Swayze, actor (deceased)
- Susan Swift, actress
- Amir Taghi, fashion designer
- That Mexican OT, rapper
- B. J. Thomas, singer (deceased)
- Larry D. Thomas, 2008 Texas State Poet Laureate
- Slim Thug (born Stayve Jerome Thomas), rapper
- Gary Tinterow, art historian and curator
- Don Toliver, rapper, singer and songwriter
- Allison Tolman, actress
- Nephew Tommy, actor
- Rigo Tovar, emigrated from Matamoros, Tamaulipas, Mexico (deceased)
- Trae tha Truth (born Frazier Othel Thompson), rapper
- Tommy Tune, dancer and choreographer
- Steve Tyrell, singer and music producer
- Ngozi Ukazu, author
- The Undertaker (born Mark William Calaway), wrestler
- Brooke Valentine, singer
- Idalia Valles, actress
- Ameer Vann (former member of Brockhampton), rapper
- Jaci Velasquez, singer
- Sauce Walka, rapper
- Paul Wall, rapper
- Isaiah Washington, actor
- Watermark, band
- Waterparks, band
- William Ward Watkin, architect (deceased)
- Johnny Guitar Watson, musician, singer, and songwriter (deceased)
- Alicia Webb, wrestling personality
- Wesley Weston, Jr., rapper
- Al White, actor
- JoBeth Williams, actress
- Chandra Wilson, actress
- Harris Wittels, actor, writer, comedian, musician (deceased)
- Craig Xen, rapper
- Z-Ro (born Joseph Wayne McVey)
- Renée Zellweger, from Katy, actress
- Gwendolyn Zepeda, author

== Business, government, law, and military ==
George H. W. Bush

George W. Bush

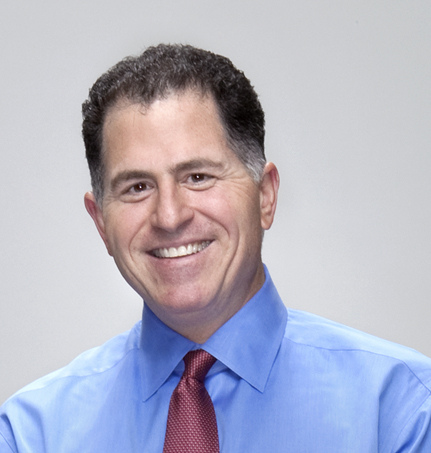
Michael Dell

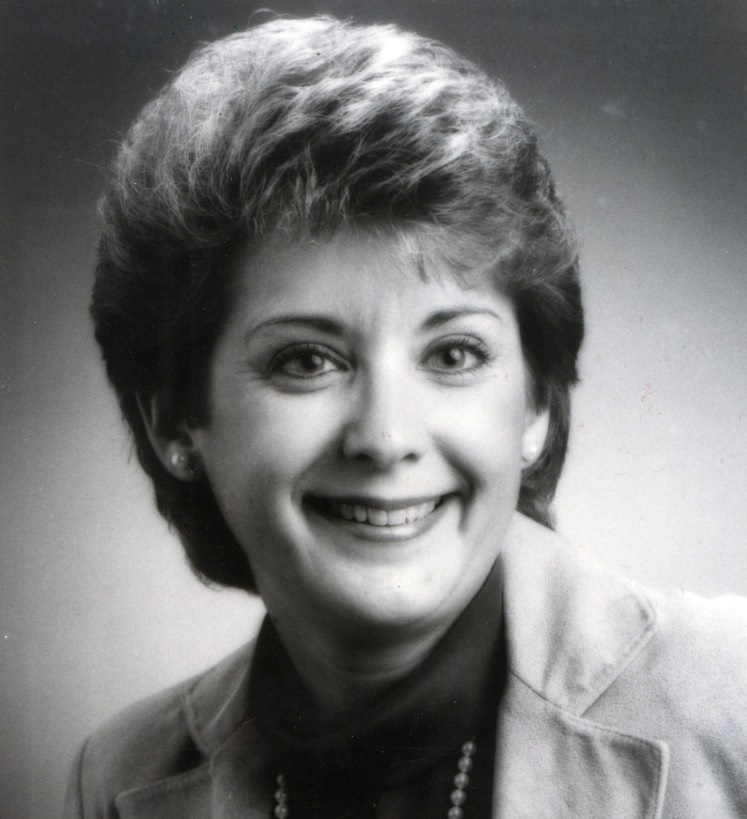
Kathy Whitmire

- Elsa Alcala, judge since 2011 of the Texas Court of Criminal Appeals, Kingsville native, resides in Houston
- Monroe Dunaway Anderson, banker; cotton trader; co-founder of Anderson, Clayton and Company; philanthropist; namesake of University of Texas MD Anderson Cancer Center
- Mary Kay Ash, cosmetics mogul
- James A. Baker (born 1821), lawyer and founder of the law firm now known as Baker and Botts
- James A. Baker (born 1857), lawyer for William Marsh Rice and trustee for Rice University
- James A. Baker Jr., lawyer for the law firm now known as Baker and Botts, banker, and real estate developer
- James A. Baker III, White House chief of staff, secretary of state
- John Brown Bell, African American real estate investor, businessman, civic leader, and civil servant
- Paul Bettencourt, member of the Texas State Senate from District 7
- Jeff Bezos, founder and CEO of Amazon.com
- Bill Blythe, Houston realtor and former state representative
- Paul Bremond, merchant and railroad developer
- George H. W. Bush, 43rd vice president and 41st president of the United States; father of George W. Bush
- George W. Bush, former governor of Texas (1995–2000) and 43rd president of the United States; son of George H.W. Bush
- Jeb Bush, former governor of Florida (1999–2007), and 2016 presidential candidate; brother of George W. Bush
- Briscoe Cain, Republican member of the Texas House
- Erica Lee Carter, U.S. representative for Texas
- John Carter, United States House of Representatives|U.S. representative for Texas
- Greg Casar, U.S. representative for Texas
- William L. Clayton, cotton trader; co-founder of Anderson Clayton Co., government official
- John Cornyn, U.S. senator from Texas
- Ted Cruz, U.S. senator from Texas; former 2016 Republican presidential candidate
- Adam Dell, millionaire businessman, lawyer
- Michael Dell, co-founder and CEO of Dell Inc.
- Richard W. Dowling, Civil War officer
- Anna Johnson Dupree (1891–1977), business owner and philanthropist
- Rama Duwaji, animator, illustrator and ceramist, First Lady-designate of New York City
- Les Eaves, Republican member of the Arkansas House of Representatives for White County; former Houston resident
- Gary Elkins, politician
- Tilman J. Fertitta, businessman and reality TV personality
- Lizzie Fletcher, U.S. representative for Texas
- Nobia A. Franklin (1892–1934), African-American beauty mogul
- Sylvia Garcia, U.S. representative for Texas, former Texas state senator
- Glen Gondo, businessman and founder of the Japan Festival
- Al Green, U.S. representative for Texas
- Jay F. Honeycutt, former director of the Kennedy Space Center; began career in Houston in 1966 as engineer at Johnson Space Center
- Edward Mandell House, diplomat, a commissioner of the Paris Peace Conference of 1919, and advisor of Woodrow Wilson
- Randolph W. House, US Army lieutenant general, raised in Houston
- Joan Huffman, politician
- Howard Hughes, billionaire aviator, film producer
- Wesley Hunt, U.S. representative for Texas
- Thad Hutcheson, politician
- Jesse H. Jones, politician
- Barbara Jordan, U.S. representative
- Sheila Jackson Lee, member of the House of Representatives (1995 to 2024), candidate for mayor of Houston, TX in 2023, member of the Houston City Council (1990 to 1995)
- Mickey Leland, politician
- Morgan Luttrell, U.S. representative for Texas
- James E. Lyon, banker
- Gray H. Miller, senior United States district judge of the United States District Court for the Southern District of Texas
- Matt Mullenweg, co-founder of WordPress
- Steve Munisteri, politician
- David Newell, judge of the Texas Court of Criminal Appeals, Place 9
- Tom Oliverson, anesthesiologist and incoming state representative for District 130
- Dan Patrick, lieutenant governor of Texas, outgoing member of the Texas State Senate
- Dennis Paul, state representative from District 129 in Harris County
- Gilbert Pena, incoming 2015 Republican member of the Texas House of Representatives from Pasadena, lived in Houston prior to 1992
- Jack Porter, U.S. Senate candidate in 1948 and a builder of the modern Texas Republican Party
- Leighton Schubert, state representative from Caldwell, Texas; former Houston resident
- Jim Sharp, state court judge, 2009–2014
- Suhas Subramanyam (born 1986), U.S. representative for Virginia
- Stephen Susman (1941–2020), plaintiffs attorney and a founding partner of Susman Godfrey
- Sylvester Turner (1954–2025), mayor of Houston and U.S. representative for Texas
- Kathryn J. Whitmire, first female mayor of Houston; served five terms
- Jared Woodfill, Houston attorney and former chairman of the Harris County Republican Party
- Kevin Patrick Yeary, judge of the Texas Court of Criminal Appeals, based in San Antonio; former assistant district attorney for Harris County

== Religion ==
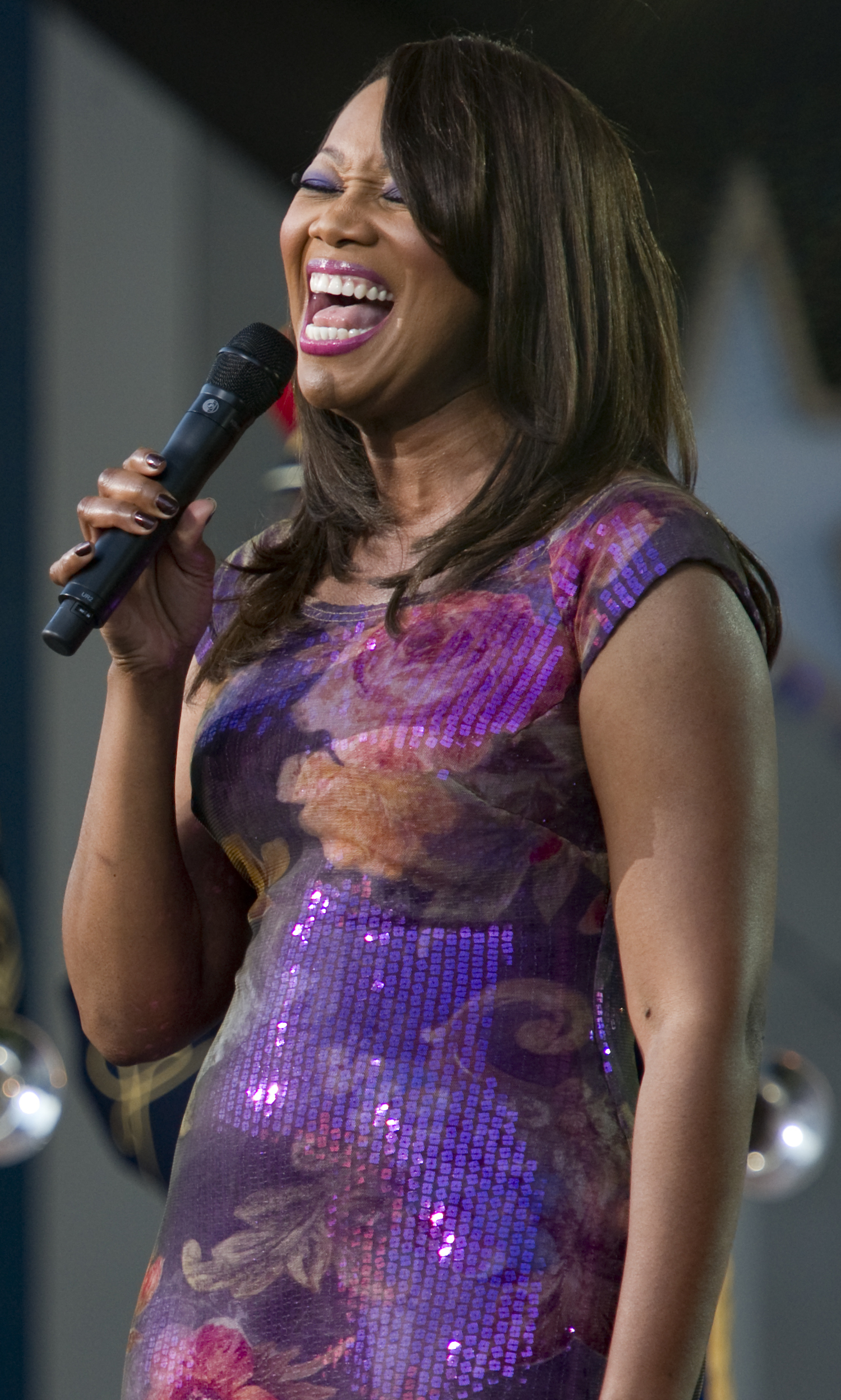
Yolanda Adams

- Yolanda Adams
- Charles L. Allen
- Kim Burrell
- Jerome Cabeen
- Finis Alonzo Crutchfield
- Rafael Cruz
- Yusuf Estes
- Jerry Johnston
- David Koresh
- Hal Lindsey
- Joel Osteen
- Paul Osteen
- Paul Pressler
- Hyman Judah Schachtel
- Marianne Williamson

== Science ==
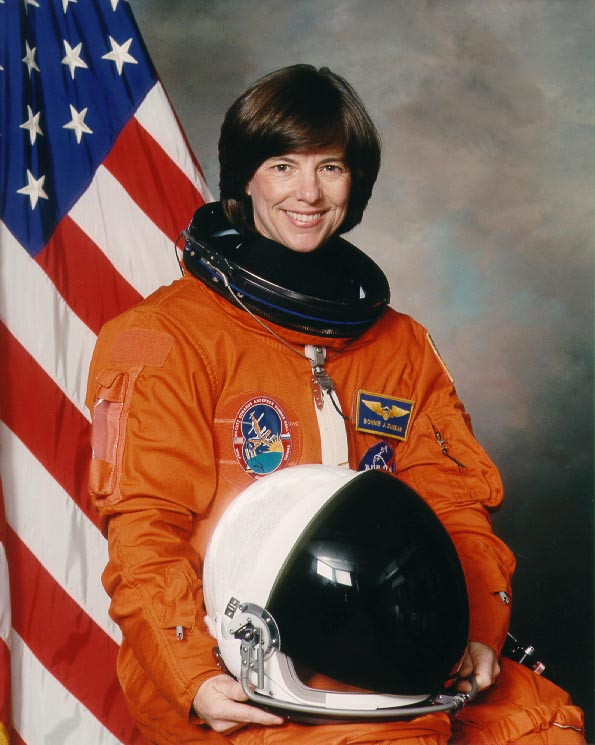
Bonnie J. Dunbar

- Red Adair, oil-well firefighter
- James P. Allison, chairman of Immunology at the University of Texas MD Anderson Cancer Center and 2018 Nobel Prize winner in Physiology or Medicine for the invention of immune checkpoint inhibition
- Malcolm Brenner, former director of the Center for Cell & Gene Therapy at Baylor College of Medicine and CAR T-cell therapy pioneer
- Denton Cooley, heart surgeon
- Michael DeBakey, heart surgeon
- James "Red" Duke, trauma surgeon
- Bonnie J. Dunbar, astronaut, professor, director of Aerospace Engineering and director of STEM Center at the University of Houston
- Mary K. Estes, Ph.D., professor in molecular virology and microbiology and in medicine-gastroenterology at Baylor College of Medicine, founding director of the Texas Medical Center Digestive Diseases Center
- Helen Heslop, stem cell transplanter and director of the Center for Cell & Gene Therapy at Baylor College of Medicine
- William V. Houston, physicist and president of Rice University
- Lydia Kavraki, Ph.D., computer scientist
- Dr. Ellen Ochoa, director of NASA Johnson Space Center, veteran astronaut
- Richard Smalley, chemist, physicist and astronomer; recipient of the Nobel Prize in Chemistry (1996)
- Robert Woodrow Wilson, astronomer; born in Houston and graduated from Rice University (1957); recipient of the Nobel Prize in Physics (1976)

== Athletics ==
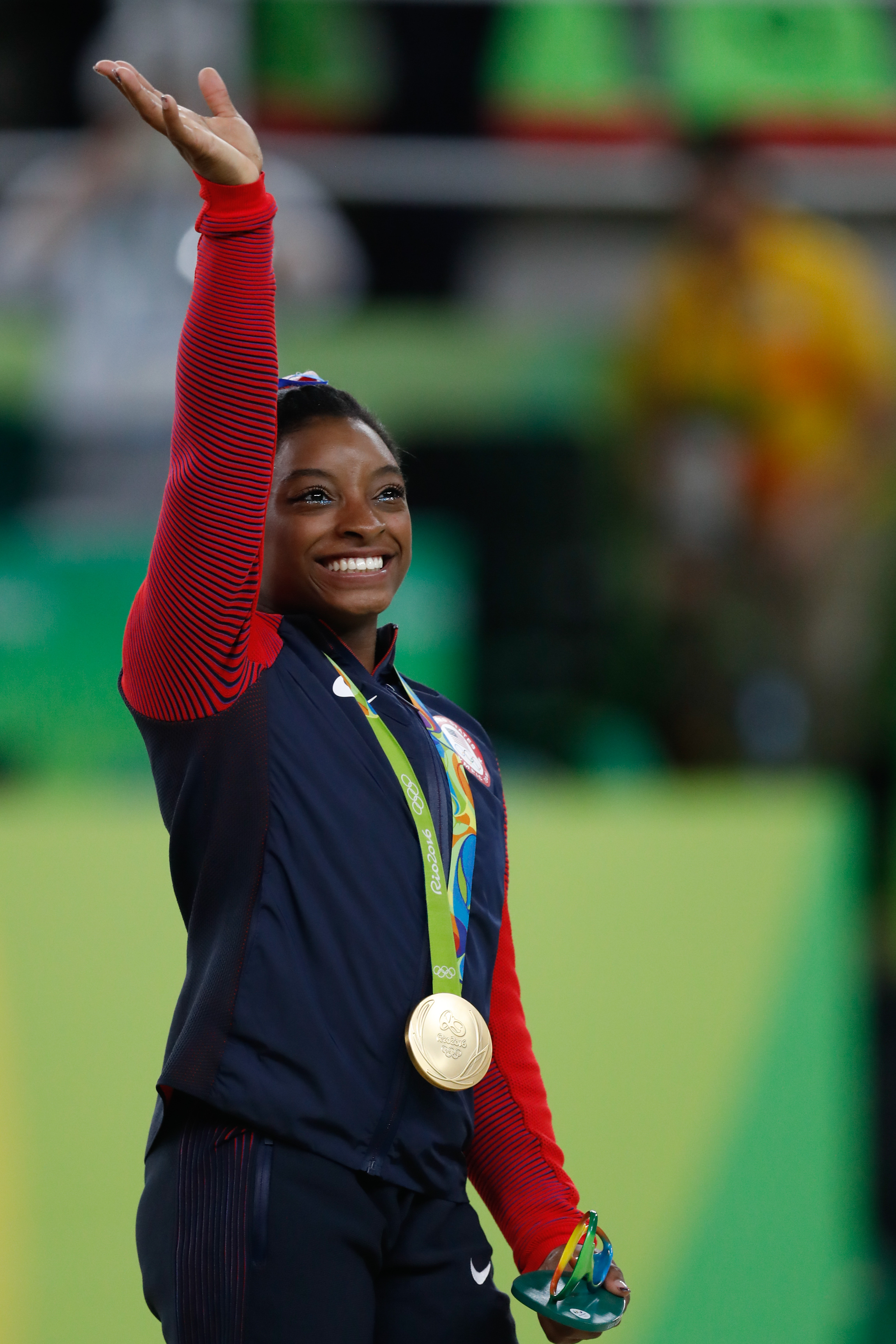
Simone Biles

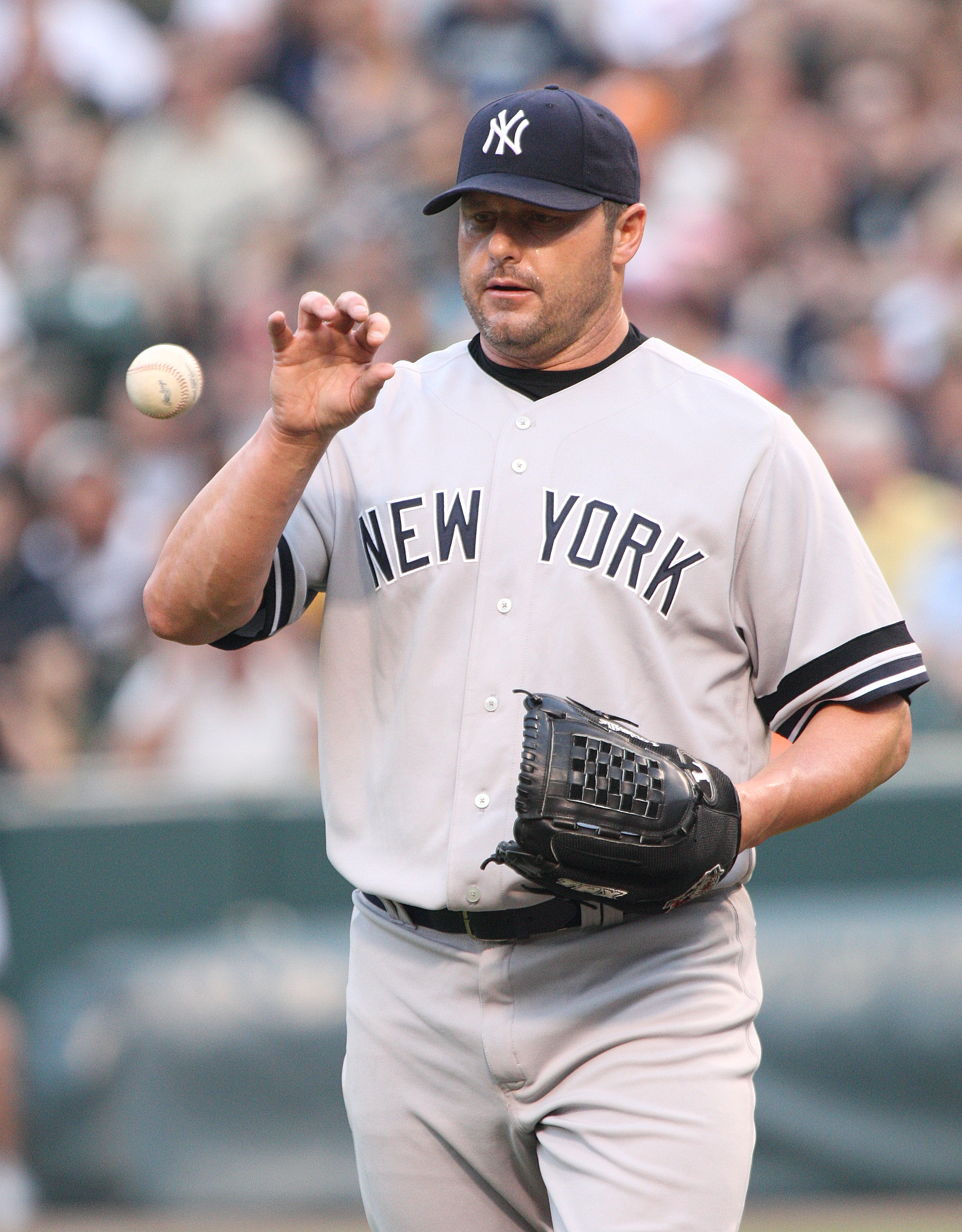
Roger Clemens

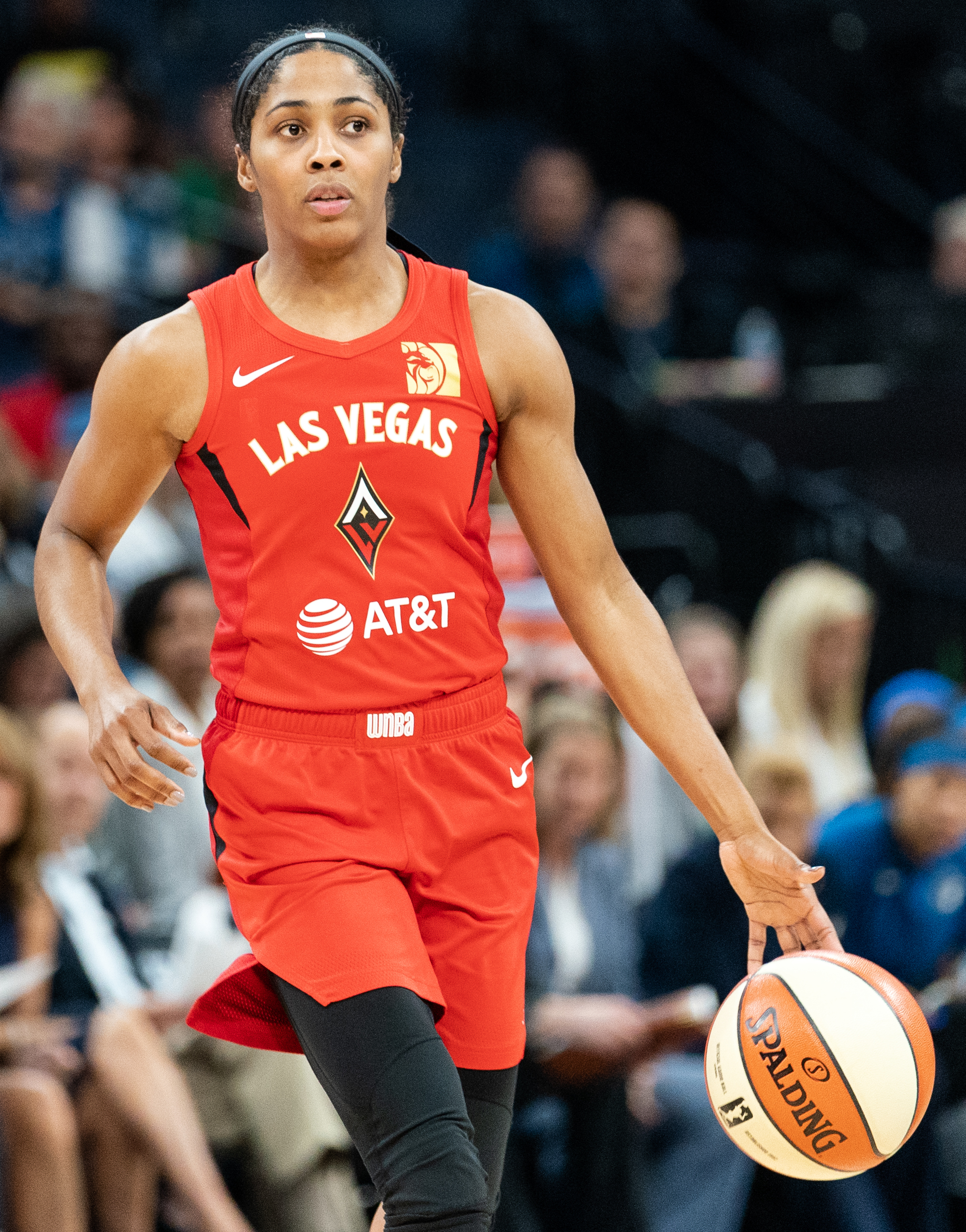
Sydney Colson

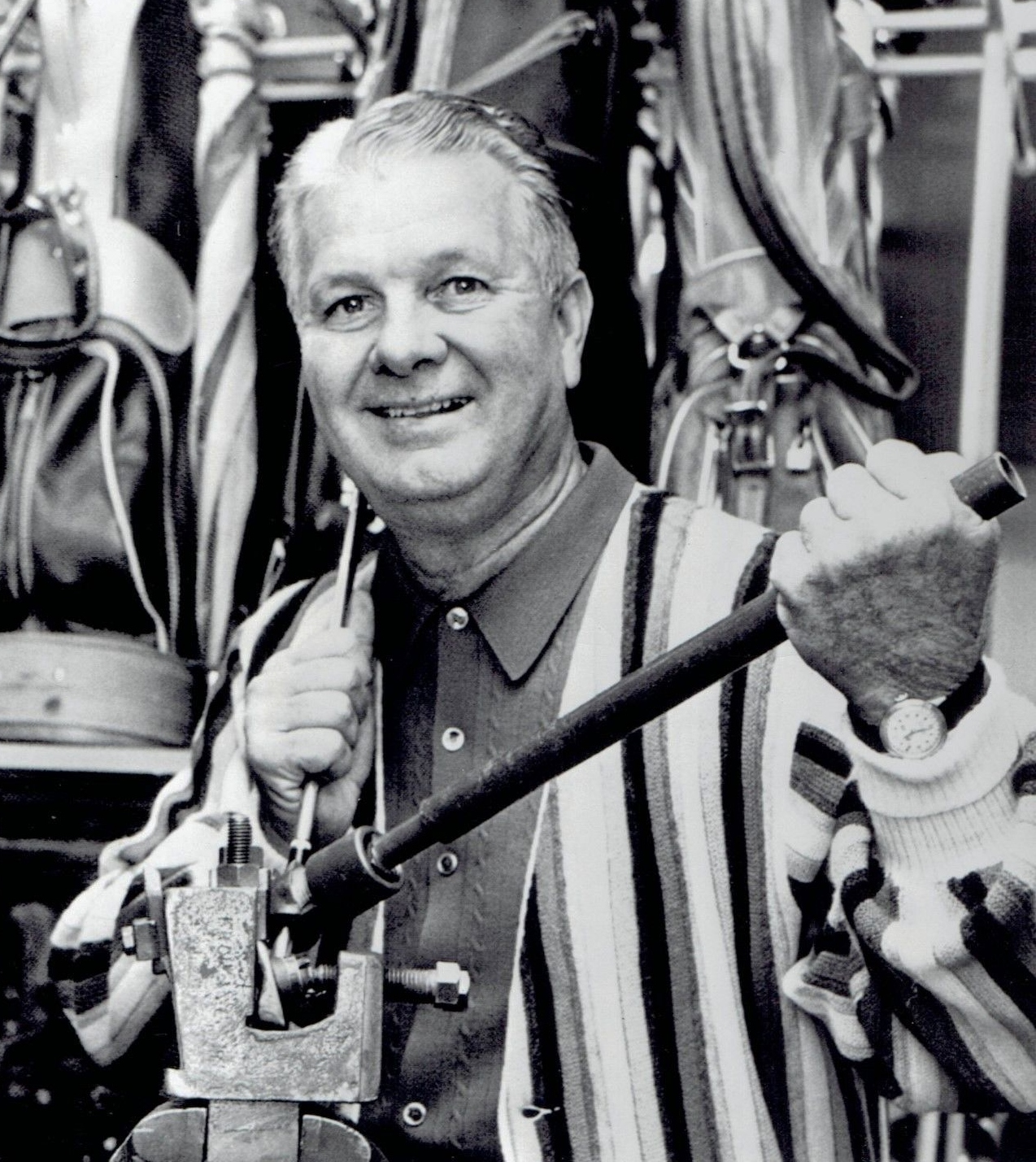
Jimmy Demaret

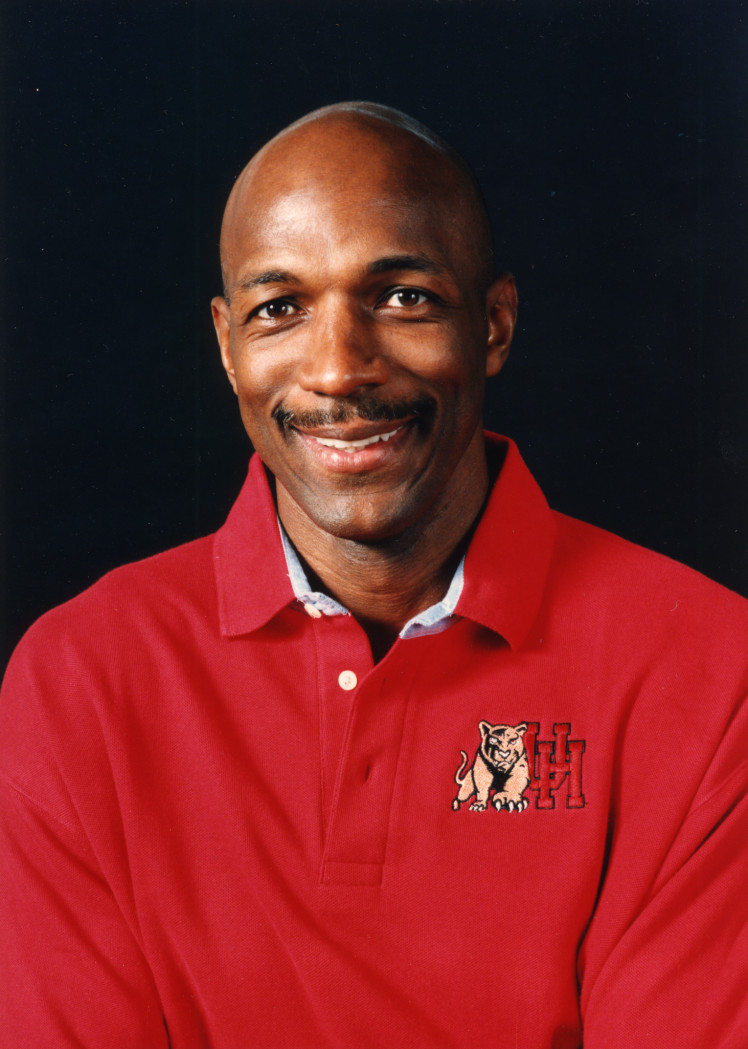
Clyde Drexler

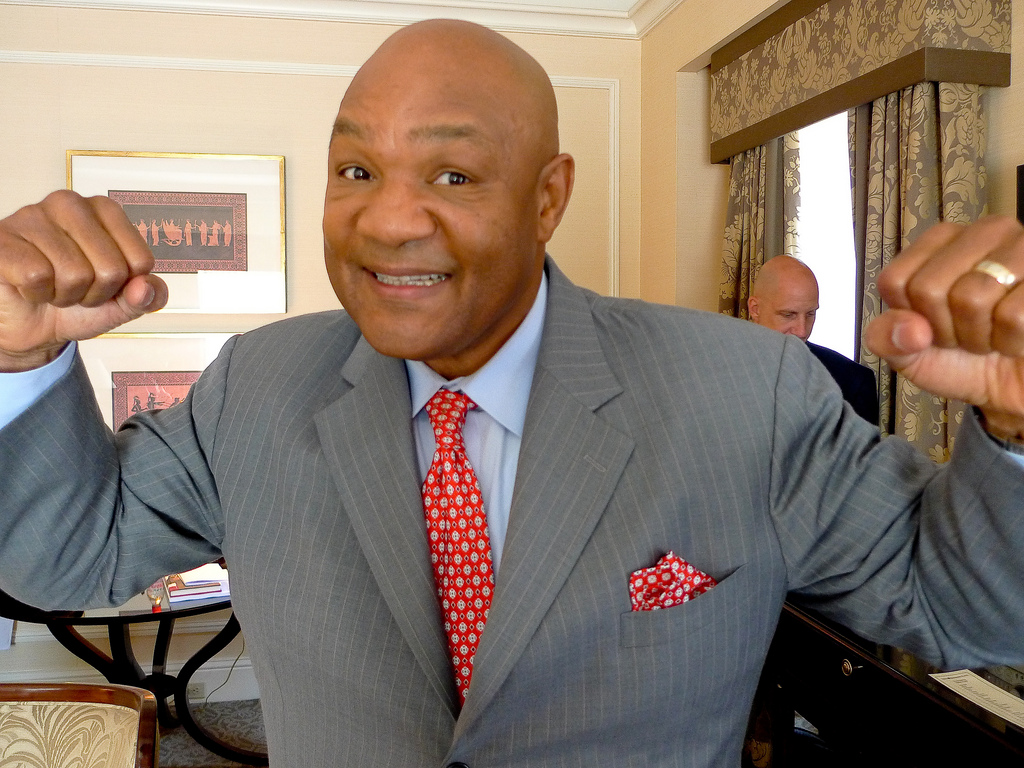
George Foreman

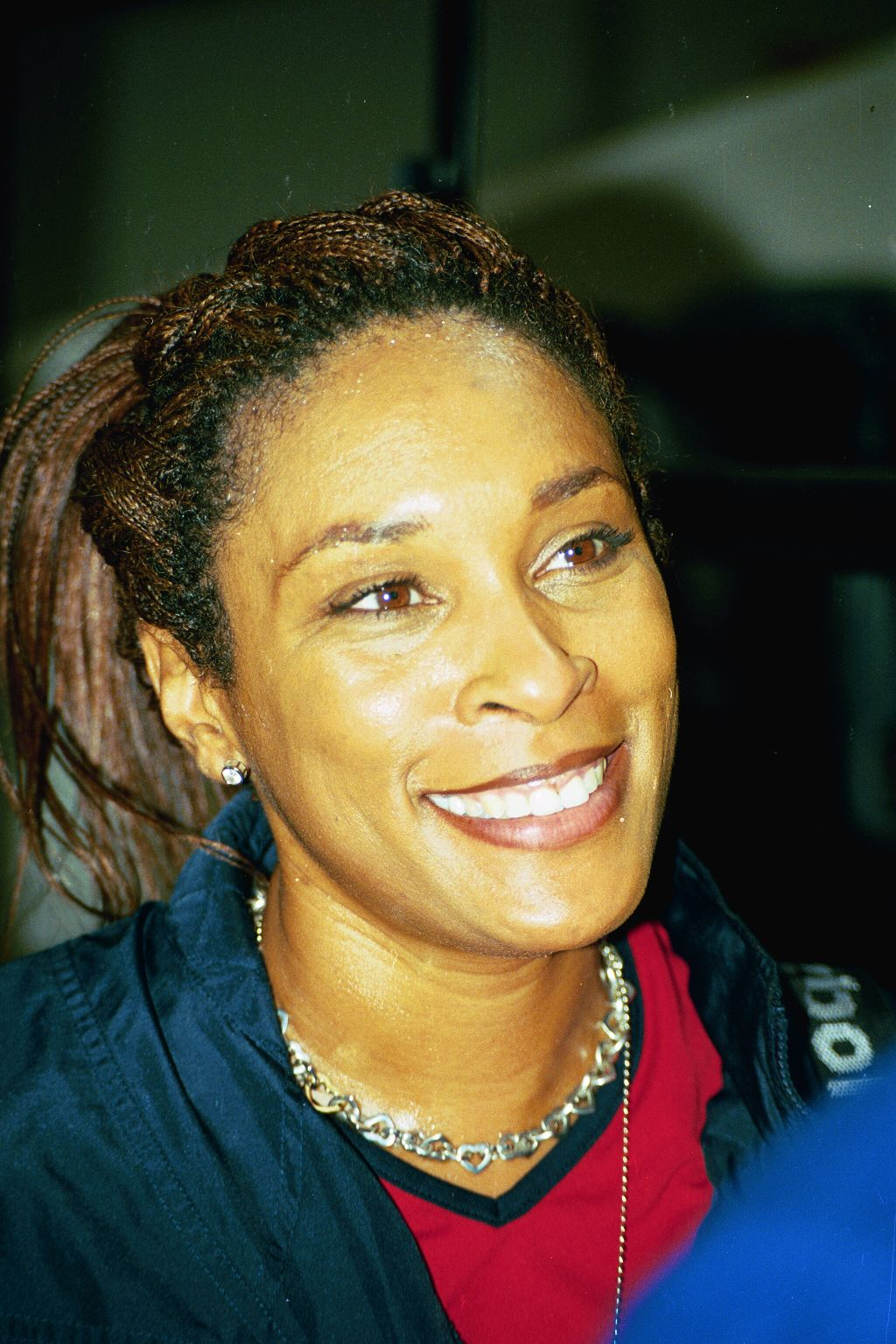
Zina Garrison

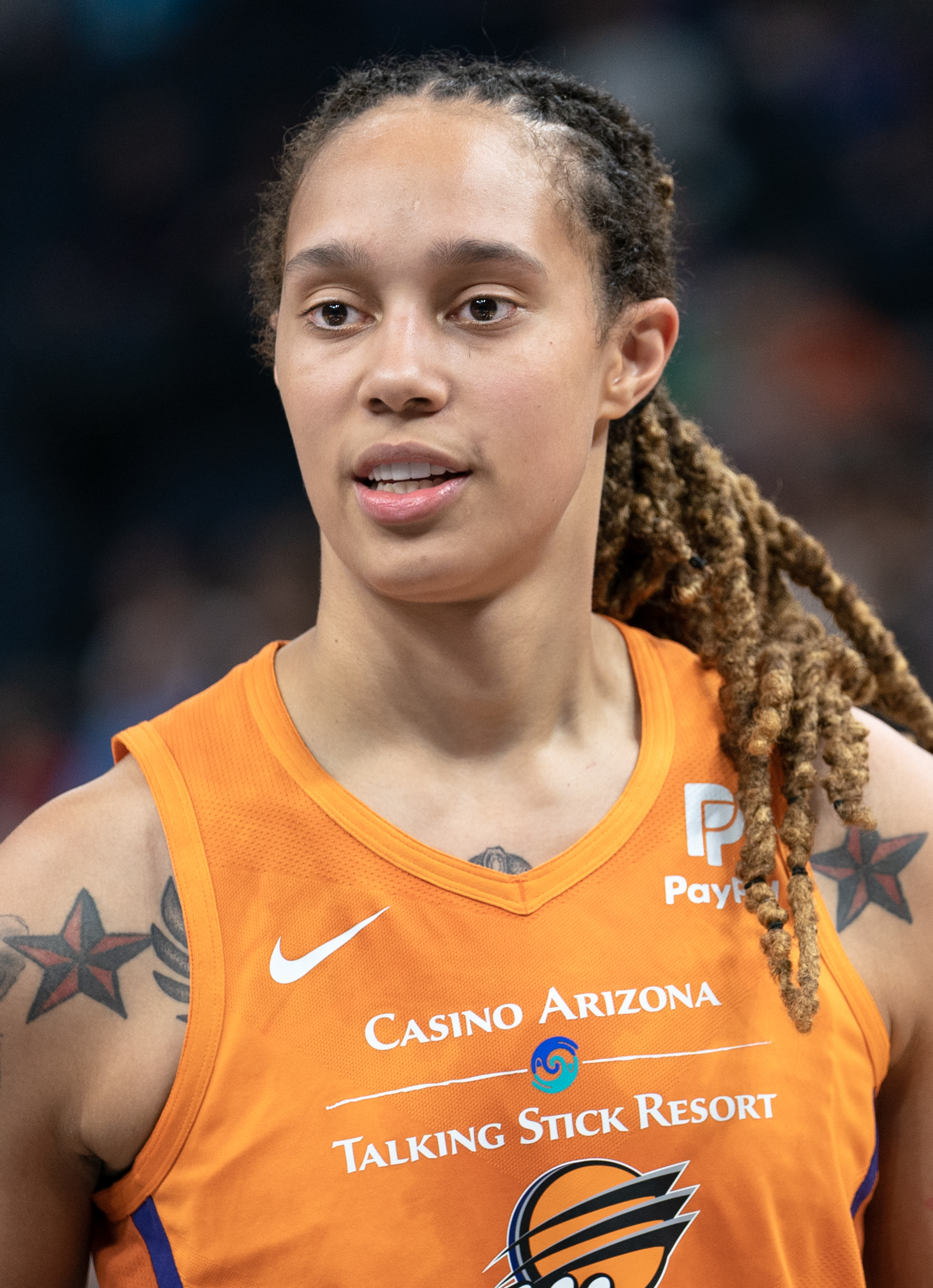
Brittney Griner

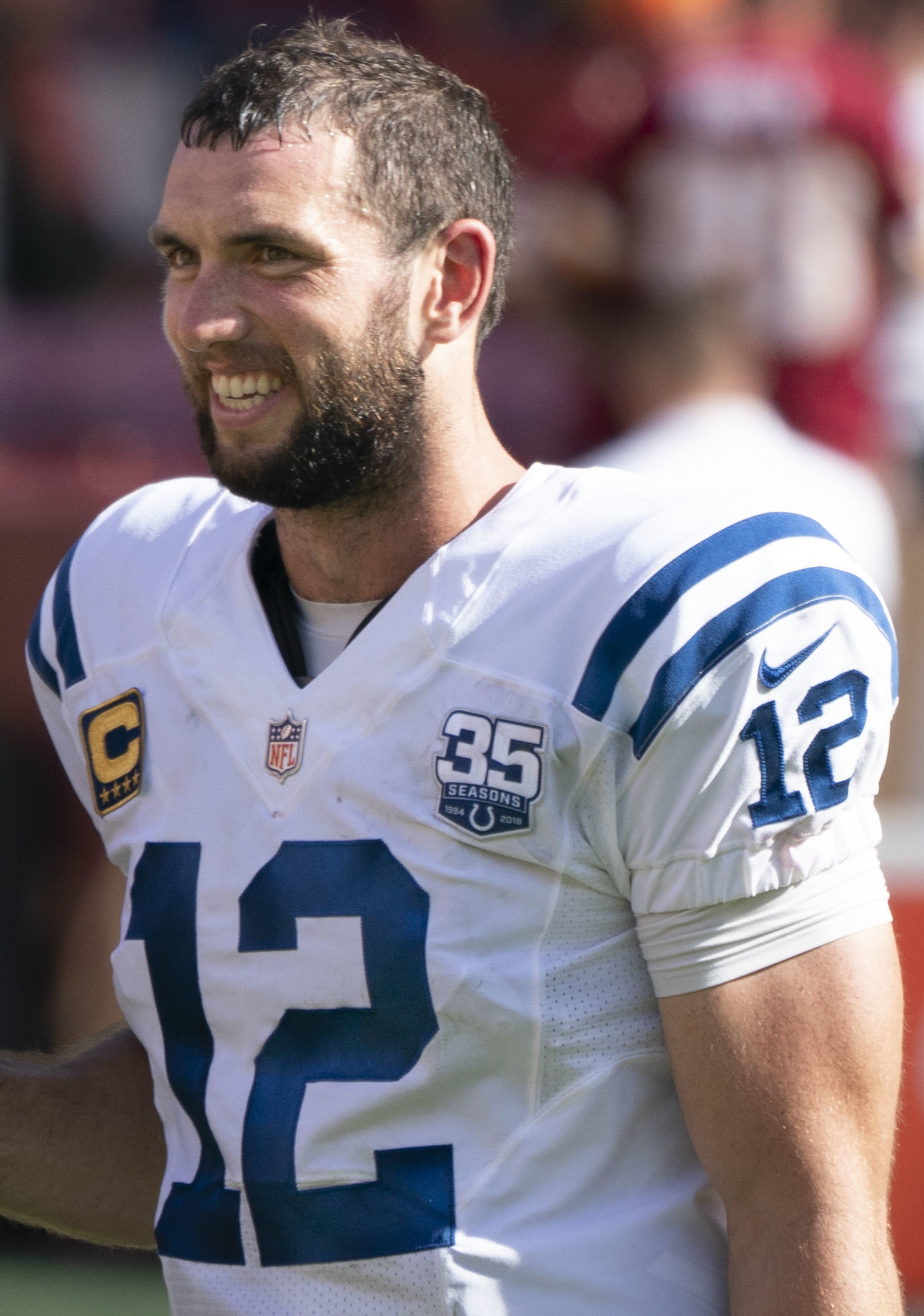
Andrew Luck

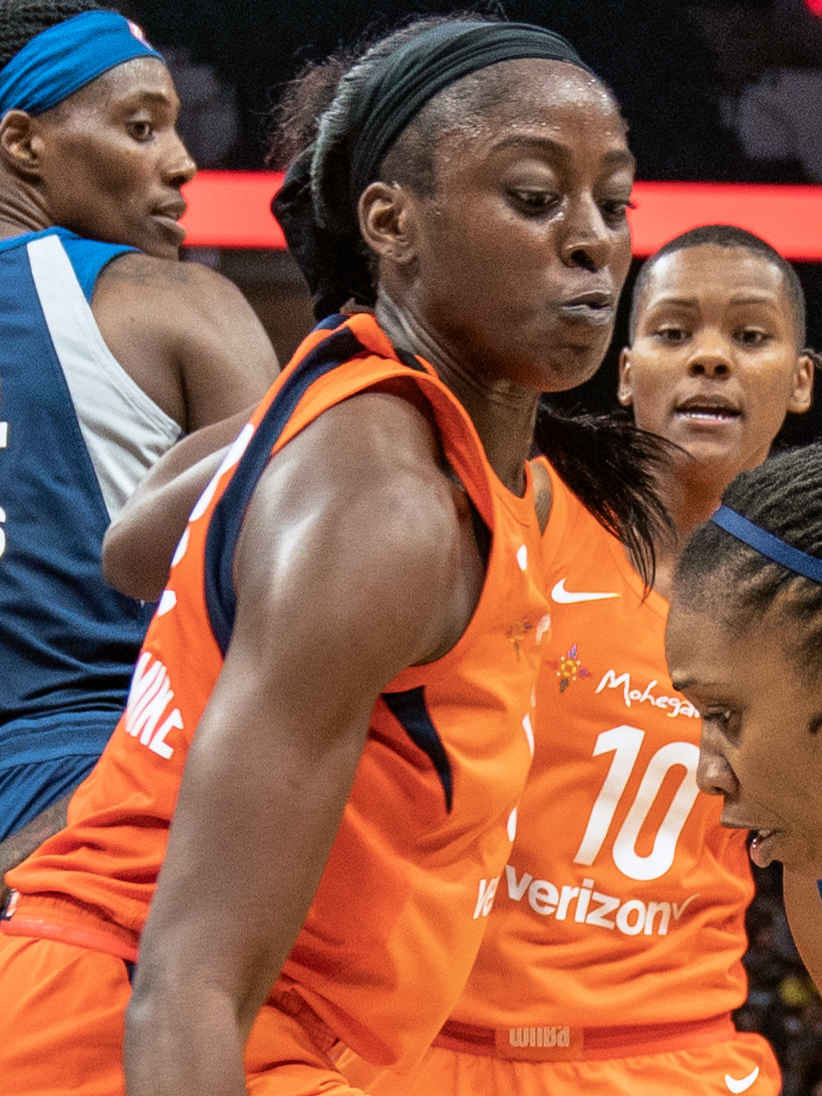
Chiney Ogwumike

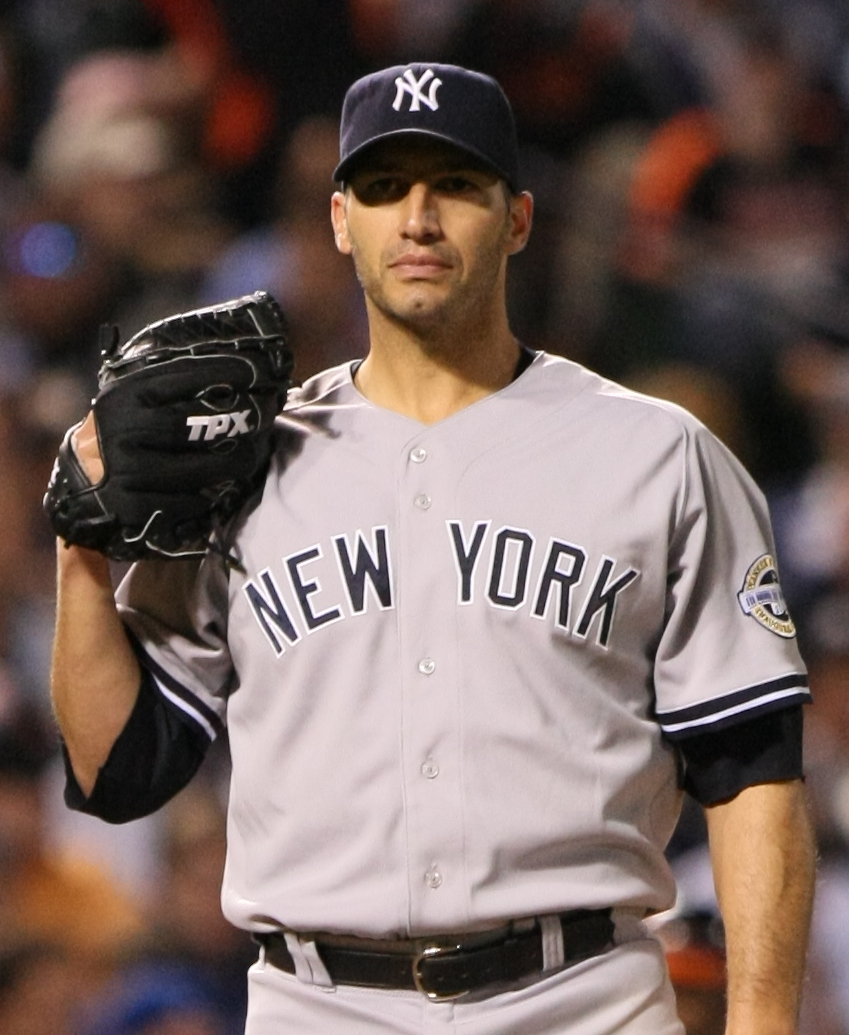
Andy Pettitte

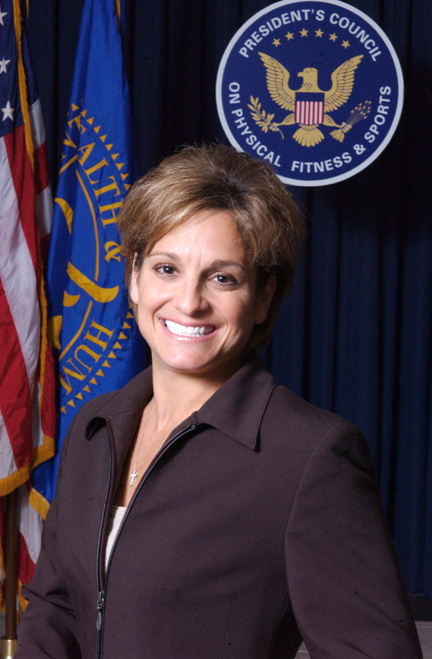
Mary Lou Retton

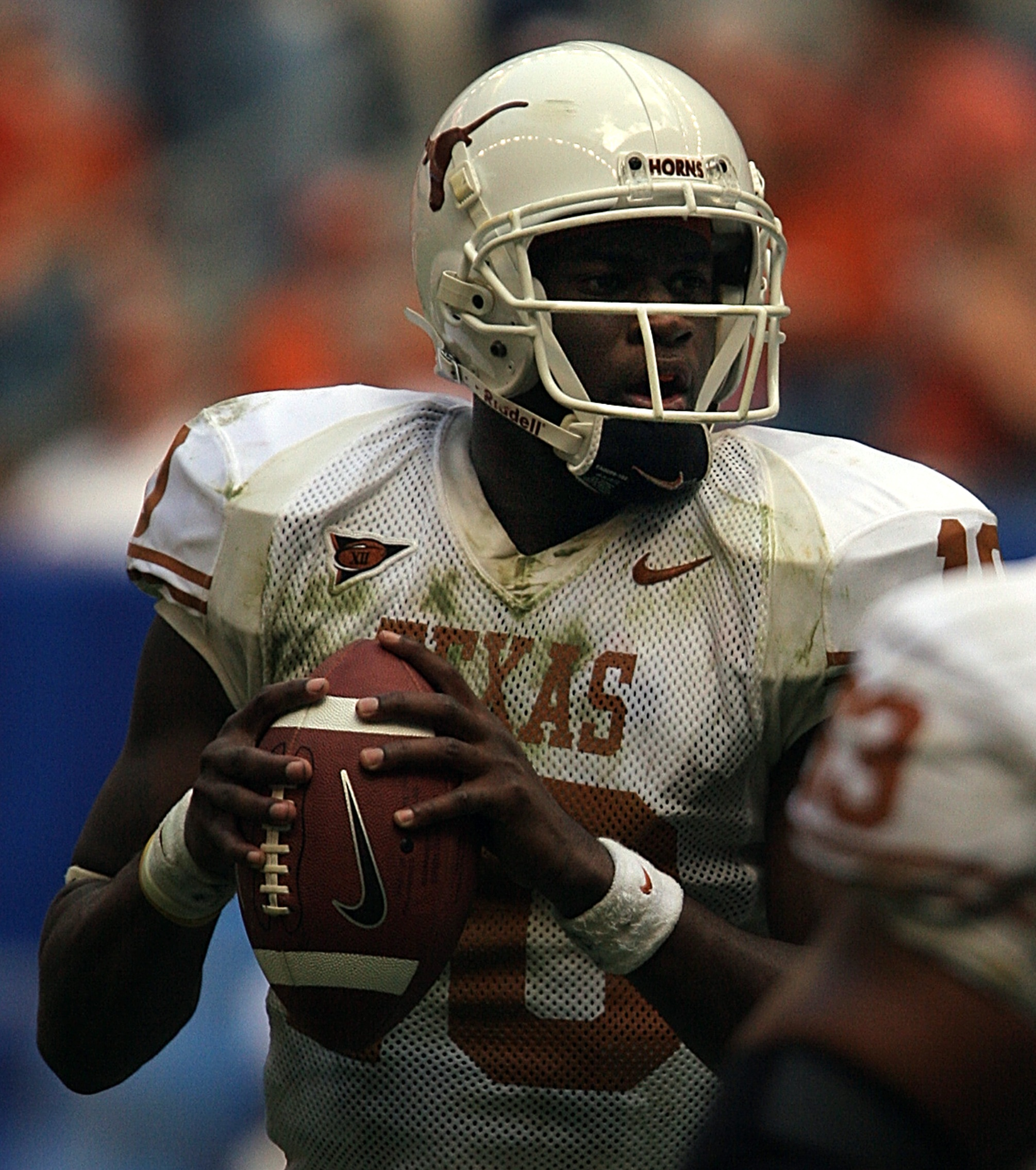
Vince Young

- Cammile Adams, Olympic swimmer
- Sam Adams, football player
- Samuel Adeniran, soccer player
- Victor Aiyewa, football player
- Nelson Akwari, soccer player
- Lance Alworth, football player
- Arturo Álvarez, soccer player
- Cadillac Anderson, basketball player
- Heather Armbrust, IFBB professional bodybuilder
- Dorance Armstrong, football player
- Adger Armstrong , football player
- Tim Atchison, former American football player
- H. B. Bailey, auto racer
- Stuart Holden, soccer player raised in Sugar Land
- Harold Bailey, football player
- Keith Baldwin, football player
- Johnathan Baldwin, football player
- Joey Banes, football player
- Daniel Bard, Major League Baseball pitcher
- Pat Batteaux, football player
- Shane Baz (born 1999), MLB pitcher
- Peter Berry, University of Alabama wheelchair basketball player
- Martellus Bennett , football player
- Simone Biles, gymnast
- Michael Bishop, football player
- Matthew Boling, track and field athlete
- Jason Bourgeois, MLB player
- Michael Bourn, former MLB outfielder who played for the Houston Astros
- Jeff Bourns, tennis player
- Joe Bowman, marksman of the American West
- Ken Bradshaw, big wave surf
- O. J. Brigance , football player
- Michael Brockers, football player
- Vernon Broughton, football player
- Jimmy Butler, NBA basketball player
- Mark Calaway, professional wrestler
- Ajani Carter , football player
- Tina Chandler, IFBB professional bodybuilder
- Jermall Charlo, boxer
- K'Lavon Chaisson, football player
- Roger Clemens, former MLB pitcher who played for the Houston Astros
- Trevor Cobb , football player
- Brad Coleman, auto racer
- Sydney Colson, WNBA point guard for the Las Vegas Aces
- Carl Crawford, MLB player
- Sedrick Curry, football player
- Andy Dalton, football player, from Katy, Texas
- Quartney Davis, football player
- Santia Deck, athlete
- Jimmy Demaret, golfer
- Gerald Dockery, football player
- Karl Douglas, football player
- Caleb Douglas, football player
- Clyde Drexler, basketball player
- Donald Driver, retired football player
- Tyler Duffey, baseball player
- Adam Dunn, MLB player
- Aaron Durley, basketball player
- Zach Evans, football player
- Amanda Felder, triathlete
- Nic Fink, Olympic swimmer
- George Foreman, boxer
- Eddie Foster, NFL player
- Albert Fontenot , NFL player
- A. J. Foyt, auto racer
- Andrew Friedman, MLB executive
- Zina Garrison, tennis player, born in Houston; resident of Missouri City, Texas
- Matthew Golden, football player
- Josh Gordon, football player
- The Great Khali (born Dalip Rana), professional wrestler, promoter, model and actor
- Tristan Gray, baseball player
- Rod Graves, NFL scout
- Donovan Greer, football player
- Darrell Green, football player
- Brittney Griner, basketball player
- Gage Guerra, soccer player
- Ben Guez, baseball player
- Charlie Haas, retired professional wrestler
- Mauro Hamza (born 1965 or 1966), Egyptian fencing coach
- Brede Hangeland, soccer player
- Lindsey Harding, basketball player
- Will Harris, MLB relief pitcher who played for the Houston Astros
- D. J. Hayden, professional football player, Oakland Raiders
- Warrick Holdman, football player
- Jonathan Horton, gymnast
- Xavien Howard, football player
- Jalen Hurts, football player
- Fabian Hürzeler, born in Houston, manager for Premier League club Brighton and Hove Albion FC
- Germain Ifedi, football player
- Steve Jackson, former defensive back, currently the senior offensive assistant for the Atlanta Falcons
- William Jackson III, football player
- Craig James, football player
- Jerrod Johnson , former player and current NFL coach
- Brandon Jordan, football player
- DeAndre Jordan, basketball player
- Christian Jones, football player
- Kaitlyn, wrestler
- Joshua Kalu, football player
- Scott Kazmir, MLB pitcher who played for the Houston Astros
- Kingsley Keke, football player
- Greg Kindle, football player
- Gary Kubiak, football coach
- Iris Kyle, ten-time overall Ms. Olympia professional bodybuilder
- Brandon LaFell, football player
- Derrick Lewis, UFC fighter
- Rashard Lewis, basketball player
- Tara Lipinski, figure skater, Olympic gold medalist, from Sugar Land
- Denzel Livingston (born 1993), basketball player for Hapoel Kfar Saba of the Israeli Liga Leumit
- James Loney, baseball player
- Andrew Luck, football player
- Marie Mahoney, outfielder, All-American Girls Professional Baseball League player
- Dexter Manley, football player
- Joseph Manjack,football player
- Guy Mezger, mixed martial artist
- Earl Mitchell, football player
- Johnathan Motley (born 1995), basketball player for Hapoel Tel Aviv of the Israeli Basketball Premier League
- Tyler Myers, professional ice hockey player
- Josh Nebo (born 1997), basketball player for Maccabi Tel Aviv of the Israeli Premier Basketball League
- Otito Ogbonnia,football player
- Chiney Ogwumike, basketball player
- Tyler Onyedim, football player
- Emeka Okafor, basketball player
- Yaxeni Oriquen-Garcia, IFBB professional bodybuilder
- Brian Orakpo, football player
- Kelechi Osemele, football player
- Josh Pastner, college basketball coach
- Andy Pettitte, former MLB pitcher from Deer Park, Texas, played for the Houston Astros
- Chris Paul, football player
- Patrick Paul,football player
- Gene Phillips, basketball player
- Manny Ramirez, former NFL player and current football coach
- Mel Renfro, football player
- Mary Lou Retton, gymnast, 1984 Olympic gold medalist
- Cody Risien, football player
- Taylor Rochestie (born 1985) American-Montenegrin player in the Israel Basketball Premier League
- Augustine Rubit (born 1989), basketball player in the Israeli Basketball Premier League
- Michael Russell, tennis player
- Kevin Schwantz, motorcycle racer
- Mike Singletary, football player
- Bob Smith, football player
- David Starr, auto racer
- Kohl Stewart, professional baseball pitcher for the Minnesota Twins
- Michael Strahan, American-German retired football player, actor, and television personality; currently hosts Good Morning America and NFL on FOX; born and raised in Houston before moving to Mannheim, West Germany
- Upton Stout, football player
- Mike Swick, UFC fighter
- Thurman Thomas, football player from Missouri City, Texas
- Broderick Thomas, football player
- Tyler Thornburg, baseball player
- Justin Tucker, football player (kicker)
- Michael Tualiliili, football player
- Ben Uzoh (born 1988), guard for the Cleveland Cavaliers and New Jersey Nets; graduated from Earl Warren High School in 2006
- Joshua Van, UFC Flyweight Champion
- Will Vest, professional baseball player
- Billy Wade, auto racer
- Bones Weatherly, football player
- Kaitlyn Weaver, Olympic ice dancer
- Ruston Webster, scout for the Atlanta Falcons
- Kip Wells,MLB pitcher
- Billy Welu, professional bowler
- Hayden Wesneski , MLB pitcher
- Reggie White, football player
- Ben Wilson, football player
- Michael Wiley, football player
- Alfred Williams, football player
- Donovan Williams, basketball player
- Trayveon Williams, football player
- Trey Williams , football player
- Willie Williams, football player
- Woody Williams, former MLB pitcher who played for the Houston Astros
- George Wright, football player
- James Young, football player
- Joe Young, basketball player
- Vince Young, football player

== Other ==
- Ahmed Ajaj, Palestinian convicted of participating in the 1993 World Trade Center bombing
- Franklin DeWayne Alix, serial killer; executed in 2010
- Suzanne Basso, convicted murderer and ringleader in the 1998 torture-murder of 59 year old Louis “Buddy” Musso, whom was mentally disabled; executed in 2014
- Danny Bible, serial killer known as "The Ice Pick Killer"; executed in 2018
- Busby quintuplets, set of quintuplets
- Elmer Wayne Henley, accomplice of serial killer Dean Corll, aka "The Candyman", whom he later killed
- Steven Hobbs, convicted murderer and suspected serial killer
- Ronald Ray Howard, convicted cop killer; executed in 2005
- Regan Hutsell, Miss America 2027
- Frances Newton, woman convicted of killing her husband and two children in 1987; executed in 2005
- Ronald Clark O'Bryan, convicted murderer executed in 1984 for the murder of his son Timothy O’Bryan with poisoned Halloween candy
- Robert Lynn Pruett, convicted murderer executed in 2017 for the 1999 murder of TDCJ Correctional Officer Daniel Nagle at the McConnell Unit
- Shaka Sankofa, murderer executed in 2000 for a murder committed at age 17
- Anthony Allen Shore, serial killer and child molester nicknamed “The Tourniquet Killer”; executed in 2018
- Karla Faye Tucker, convicted murderer who was the first woman executed in Texas since 1863
- Coy Wayne Wesbrook, convicted mass murderer; executed in 2016
- Garcia Glen White, convicted murderer and suspected serial killer; executed in 2024
- Ponchai Wilkerson, convicted murderer; executed in 2000
- Andrea Yates, woman who murdered her five children by drowning them in the bathtub; currently institutionalized

== See also ==
- List of people from Texas
