= Charles Allen =

Charles Allen may refer to:

== Politicians ==
- Charles Allen (Massachusetts politician) (1797–1869), American politician and congressman in Massachusetts
- Charles Allen (Australian politician) (1833–1913), Australian politician and member of the Tasmanian House of Assembly
- Charles H. Allen (1848–1934), American politician and congressman in Massachusetts, later governor of Puerto Rico
- Charles Allen (Stroud MP) (1861–1930), English Liberal politician who represented Stroud, 1900–1914
- Charles Francis Egerton Allen (1947–1927), British MP for Pembroke and Haverfordwest, 1892–1895
- Charles A. Allen (American politician) (1884–1964), American politician and member of the Los Angeles City Council
- Charles Allen (Washington, D.C., politician) (born 1977), American politician and member of the Council of the District of Columbia

== Sports ==
- Charles Allen (cricketer) (1878–1958), English cricketer
- Charles Elliot Allen (1880–1966), Irish rugby union player
- Charles A. Allen (American football) (fl. 1900), American football coach
- Charles Gladstone Allen (1868–1924), British tennis player
- Chuck Allen (1939–2016), American football player
- Charles Allen (hurdler) (born 1977), Canadian hurdler

== Others ==
- Charles Frederick Allen (1816–1899), American Methodist theologian and university president from Maine
- Charles Allen (jurist) (1827–1913), American judge in Massachusetts
- Charles Herman Allen (1828–1904), American educator and academic administrator
- Charles Grant Allen (1848–1899), Canadian science writer and novelist
- Charles B. Allen (fl. 1850), American founder of "Order of the Star Spangled Banner" secret society
- Charles Metcalf Allen (1871–1950), American hydraulic engineer
- Charles Elmer Allen (1872–1954), American botanist
- Charles Richards Allen (1885–1962), New Zealand author
- Charles Allen (RAF officer) (1899–1974), British World War I flying ace
- Charles L. Allen (1913–2005), American minister
- Charles M. Allen (1916–2000), U.S. federal judge
- Charles E. Allen (born 1936), American intelligence official at the CIA and Department of Homeland Security
- Charles Allen (writer) (1940–2020), British writer and historian
- Charles Allen, Baron Allen of Kensington (born 1957), English businessman
- Charles M. Allen (engineer), Maxim Integrated applications engineer

== See also ==
- Charlie Allen (disambiguation)
- Allen (surname)
