= Charlie Allen =

Charlie Allen may refer to:

- Charlie Allen (trumpeter) (1908–1972), American jazz trumpeter
- Charlie Allen (designer) (born 1958), British menswear designer and tailor
- Charlie Allen (singer) (1942–1990), front man for 1960s group Pacific Gas & Electric
- Charlie Allen (footballer, born 1992), English footballer
- Charlie Allen (footballer, born 2003), Northern Irish footballer
- Charlie Allen (engineer), Maxim application engineer known for proposing the MAX232 and Charlieplexing
- Charlie "Scoop" Allen (died 2012), American musician; trumpeter with Bar-Kays

== See also ==
- Charlie Allan, Scottish farmer, athlete, broadcaster and singer
- Charles Allen (disambiguation)
- Allen (surname)
