= Great fire of 1917 =

Great fire of 1917 may refer to:

- Great Thessaloniki Fire of 1917
- Great Atlanta fire of 1917
