= Order of the Star Spangled Banner =

Secret society in New York City

The Order of the Star Spangled Banner (OSSB) was an oath-bound secret society in New York City. It was created in 1849 by Charles B. Allen to protest the rise of Irish and German Catholic immigration into the United States.

To join the Order, a man had to be at least 21 years old, a Protestant, and willing to obey the Order's dictates without question. Members were Nativists, citizens opposed to immigration, especially by Catholics. They saw Catholics as dangerous, illegal voters under the control of the Pope in Rome. Members invariably responded to questions about the OSSB by claiming that they "knew nothing". This practice caused newspaper editor Horace Greeley to label them "Know Nothings". The OSSB would eventually form the nucleus of the nativist Know Nothing movement which ran candidates in 1855–56 under the American Party ticket.

According to The American Pageant:

Older-stock Americans ... professed to believe that in due time the "alien riffraff" would "establish" the Catholic church at the expense of Protestantism and would introduce "popish idols." The noisier American "nativists" rallied for political action. ... They promoted a lurid literature of exposure, much of it pure fiction. The authors, sometimes posing as escaped nuns, described the shocking sins they imagined the cloisters concealed, including the secret burial of babies. One of these sensational books – Maria Monk's Awful Disclosures (1836) – sold over 300,000 copies.

== See also ==
- Anti-Catholicism in the United States
