= Great Atlanta fire of 1917 =

1917 fire which destroyed large parts of downtown Atlanta, Georgia, USA

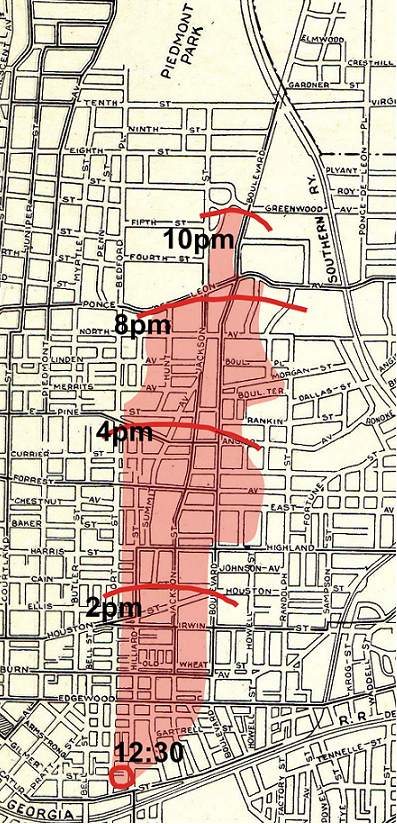
Extent of the fire

The Great Atlanta Fire of 1917 began just after noon on 21 May 1917 in the Old Fourth Ward of Atlanta, Georgia. It is unclear just how the fire started, but it was fueled by hot temperatures and strong winds which propelled the fire. The fire, which burned for nearly 10 hours, destroyed 300 acres (120 ha) and 1,900 structures displacing over 10,000 people. Damages were estimated at $5 million, ($100 million in 2025).

== The day of the fire ==
It was a clear, warm and sunny day with a brisk breeze from the south. This was not the only fire of the day, but the fourth call in the span of an hour: a small fire at the Candler Warehouse at 11:39 AM and at 11:43 a fire seven blocks north that destroyed three houses; and at 12:15, south of the Georgia Railroad from the big fire, ten homes were destroyed before being extinguished.

At 12:46 a call came from a small warehouse just north of Decatur Street between Fort and Hilliard, (approximately 33°45′2″N 84°22′38″W) and the crew sent to inspect it found a stack of burning mattresses, but had no firefighting equipment with them. If the fire department had not been spread across so many different parts of the city already, the fire would have been put out there. By the time reinforcements arrived, it was quickly leaping north.

== The Great Fire ==
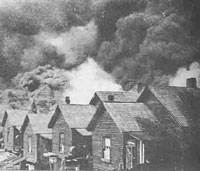
The fire in the 4th Ward

The fire spread quickly up to Edgewood Avenue and from there throughout the main residential areas of Sweet Auburn, sparing little. The area between Decatur and Edgewood was crammed with shanties and lean-tos, which provided fuel for the fire to grow very strong and move fast through the area.

A corridor was burned due north between Jackson (now Parkway and Charles Allen) and Boulevard, with a few prominent bulges at Highland and just south of Ponce de Leon Avenue. At Houston Street, the fire was still being stopped on the east by Boulevard (just sparing John Wesley Dobbs' block). When the fire reached Highland, it raced both east and west through many fine homes. Around 4:00 in the afternoon, fire-fighters had begun to stall the fire by using dynamite to destroy many homes along Pine, Boulevard and finally Ponce de Leon.

By nightfall the fire crossed Ponce de Leon. While reduced, it headed north through the recently built-out neighborhood along St. Charles, Vedado Way and Greenwood Avenue. It finally stopped at 10 PM, more than 1 mile (1.6 km) north of where it began.

In eleven hours, 22,000,000 US gallons (83,000,000 L; 18,000,000 imp gal) of water were pumped to put out the fire. Additional fire trucks had been sent from nine Georgia towns (as far away as Macon and Augusta), as well as from Chattanooga and Knoxville in Tennessee. 1,938 buildings were destroyed over 300 acres (1.2 km^{2}) spanning 73 city blocks. Fires smoldered for the rest of the week.

== Aftermath ==
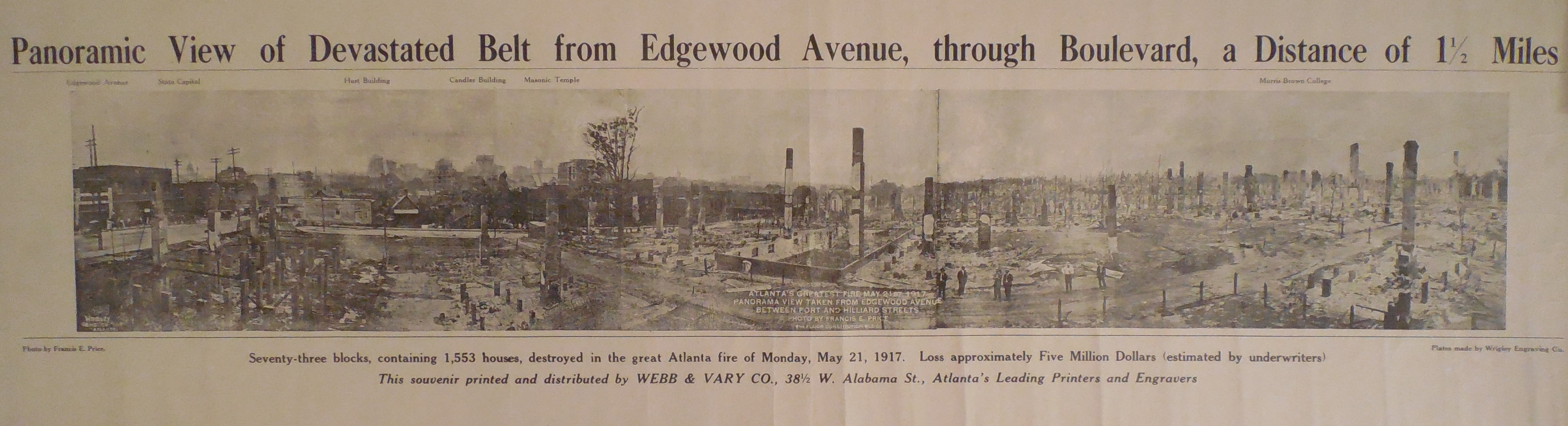
View of area destroyed by the fire

Since more than 85% of the destroyed buildings had wood shingles, the city quickly passed an ordinance banning them for new construction. By 1931 all older buildings had replaced the wood shingles. In the history of the city, only Sherman's fire of 1864 did more extensive damage.

Rebuilding was sporadic, with large swaths kept open for years. Commercial strips were quickly built on the destroyed portions of Edgewood and Auburn where busy streetcar routes ran: 17 and 3 respectively. Where large estates with spacious front yards had been, along the entire stretch of Boulevard up to Ponce, dozens of two- and three-storey apartment buildings that hugged the sidewalk were built. Large open spaces were left at what is now the King Memorial and at Bedford-Pine Park, now named Central Park (host of Music Midtown in the 2000s).

Low-income housing developments were built in the destroyed extreme southern section and the areas south of North Avenue. Some 50 acres (200,000 m^{2}) around Boulevard and Highland were eventually developed as the campus for Atlanta Medical Center. Except for where single family homes were quickly rebuilt north of Ponce de Leon, the character of this large area of Atlanta was changed forever. The next U.S. fire of more significance wouldn't occur for more than 70 years: The Oakland Hills firestorm of 1991.
