= Charles B. Allen =

In or around 1849, Charles B. Allen founded the New York-based secret society Order of the Star Spangled Banner during the rise of the Know Nothing Party and the rise of nativism in the United States.
