= Charlie Allen (designer) =

British designer (born 1958)

- Born: Charles Christopher Allen; August 1958 (age 67–68)
- Education: Royal College of Art, Chelsea School of Art, Royal College of Art
- Occupation: Designer
- Label: Charlie Allen

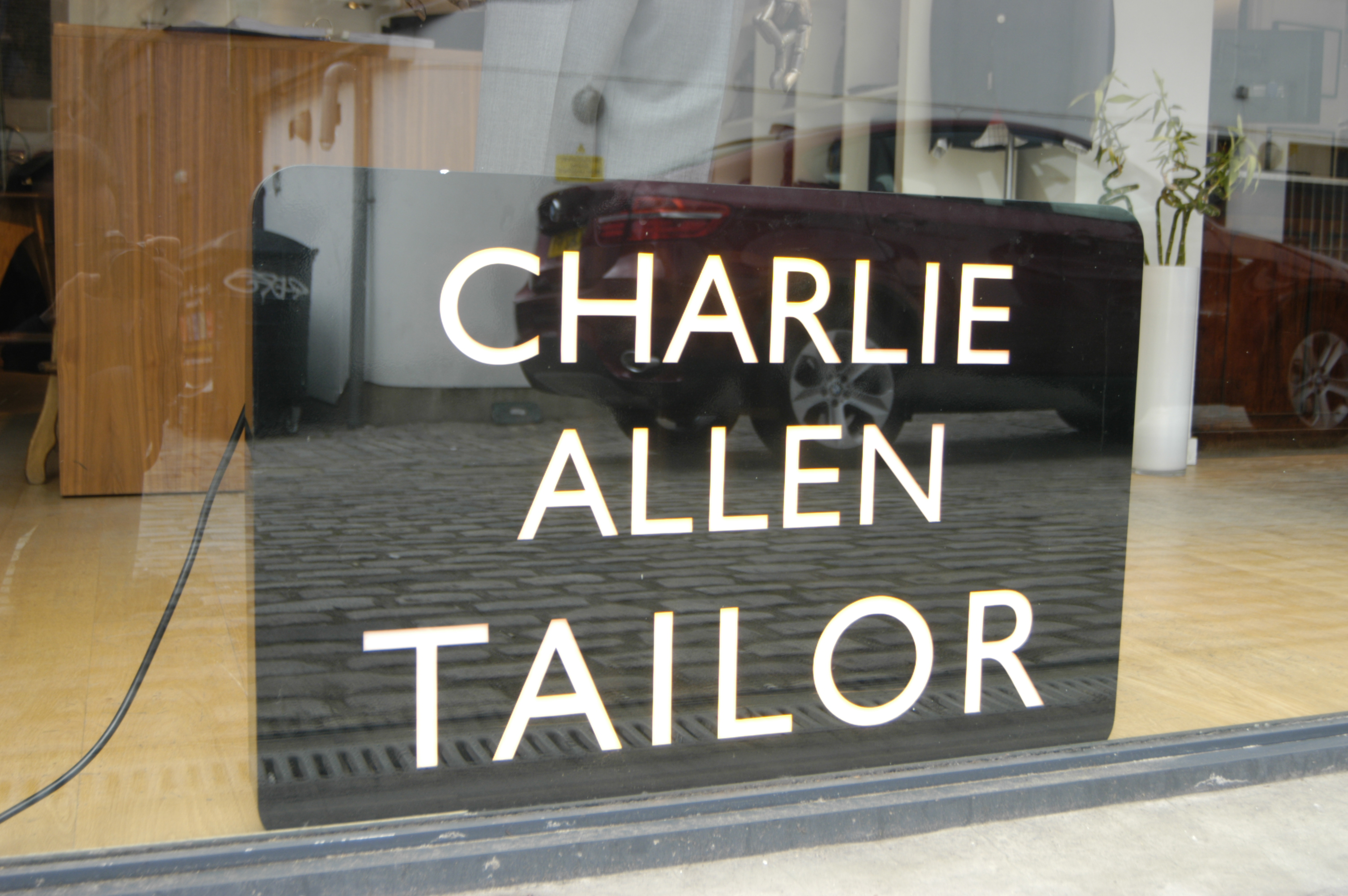
Allen's signage at his flagship emporio in Islington, London.

Charles Christopher Allen (born August 1958) is a British designer. He is a third-generation tailor.

== Education ==
Allen was educated at Highbury Grove School and at the Chelsea School of Art, where he earned a diploma of art & design. At Chelsea, Allen specialised in painting and silk-screen printing.

In 1982, he graduated with a Master of Art in Menswear Design from the Royal College of Art since when he has been practising, in varying forms, as a tailor and designer.

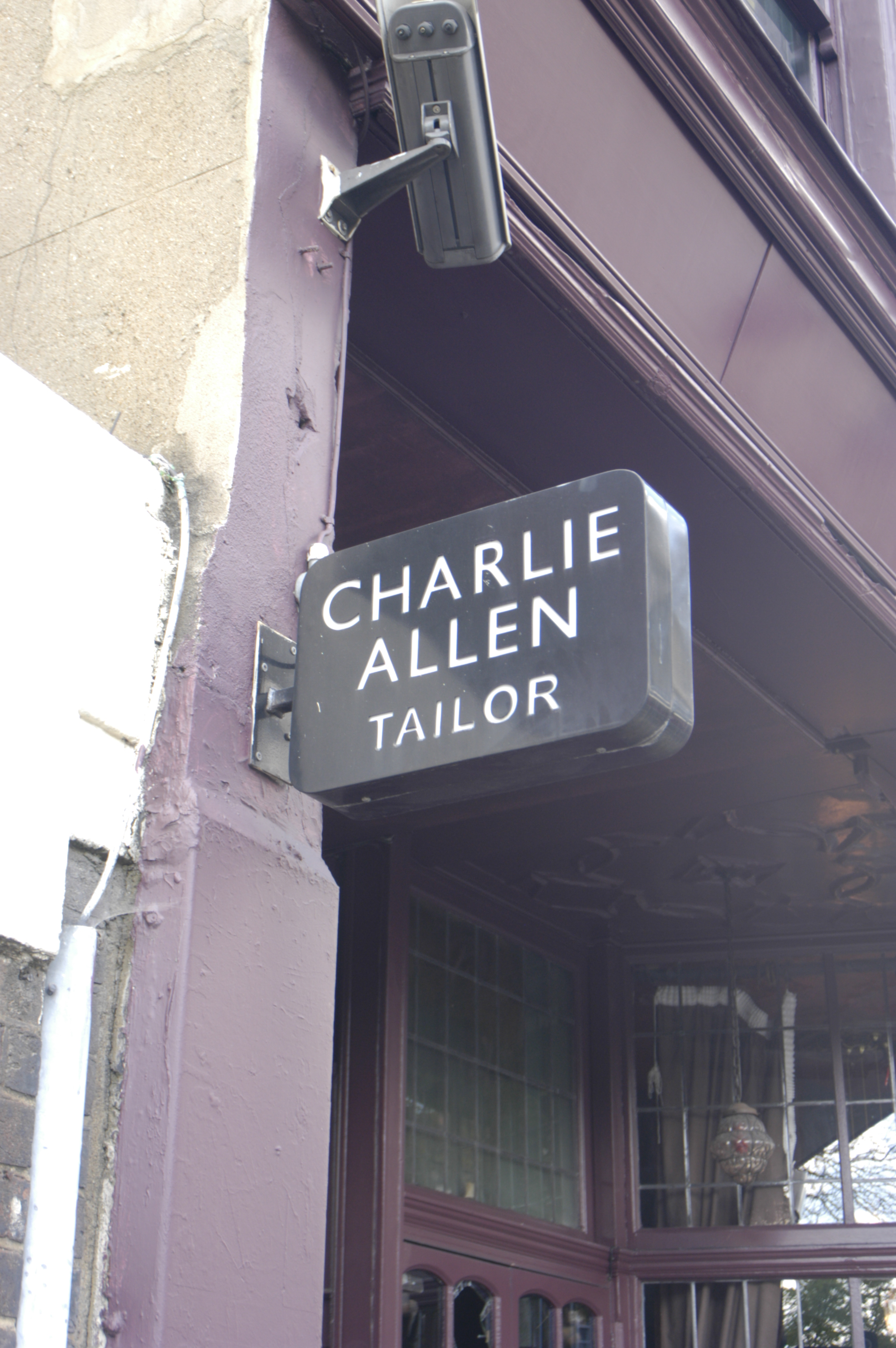
Charlie's Upper Street sign.

== Career ==
Allen was a winner of the International Linen Designer of the Year award and was Head of Menswear at the Royal College of Art (RCA) from 1994 to 1997.
