= Imani Chyle =

American singer-songwriter

Imani Chyle is an American singer-songwriter and rapper, born and raised in Houston, Texas. Her music has been described as being "much more than just hip-hop".

== Music career ==
During the early 1990s, Imani was one-half of a Houston-based female rap duo called 2Aggrivated. Their manager, Byron Hill, signed them to a 10-album deal with Profile Records, but unresolved conflicts led to the group being dropped by Profile before their already-produced debut album was released. Imani then relocated to Atlanta for a solo career, performing under the name GChyle. Though she established herself on the club scene in the Atlanta area, her career then went on a sudden downward spiral that led to her taking five years off from music.

Upon her return from that absence, Imani relocated to Los Angeles, where she decided to restart her music career, playing in numerous clubs throughout the area, including the House of Blues in Anaheim's Downtown Disney and Los Angeles' Sunset Strip, the Roxy on Sunset, Viper Room, and Key Club, where she opened for 1980's rockers the Bullet Boys near the end of 2011.

In 2011, Imani also formed her own record label, Mos Records, which is distributed by Believe Digital.

She recorded tracks for her forthcoming debut album "Season of I" with producers Monyea Crawford and Richard Rollie of LoveChild Productions in Atlanta. One of the songs from that forthcoming album, entitled "Lose Myself", was selected for play on the ESPNU program "Unite" as the result of a submission by Real Music Opportunities.

"Lose Myself" and another of Imani's songs, "Warrioress", received high reviews from Music Connection in May 2012.

"Warrioress" made its first chart appearance on December 11, 2011, when it charted among the Top 10 Rhythmic New Releases. It eventually charted No. 7 on the national airplay charts, the only independent artist who charted alongside such well-known performers as Adele, Bruno Mars, Mary J. Blige, Wale, Beyoncé, Shania Twain and Robin Thicke.

Imani has also earned several "Platinum Auddys" from uPlaya.com, and was also featured on Akon's Hitlab
