= DhoomBros =

Pakistani YouTubers Group

- Born: Shehryaar Asif (August 5, 1992 (age 33)); Hussain Asif (October 19, 1993 (age 32)); Atif Khan (March 28, 1994 (age 31)); Waqas Riaz (February 12, 1990 (age 36))
- Occupations: YouTubers, actors, dancers, entertainers, DJs, businessmen

YouTube information
- Channel: DhoomBros Official
- Years active: June 2008– Present

The DhoomBros (Urdu: دھوُم بروز) are a Pakistani-American dance group, as well as YouTubers, actors, singers and entertainers. Based in New York and Houston, the group consists of Shehryaar Asif, Hussain Asif, Atif Khan and Waqas Riaz. Since creating their first channel (DhoomBros) in 2008, their videos have gathered over 55 million views, excluding those from their more recent channel (The DhoomBros) started in 2012.

They are particularly known for their satirical takes on everyday Desi lives, parodies of mainstream entertainment, video blogs, short films, and their Mehndi dance performances. In 2016, the group began streaming their online drama Hum Kahan Chal Diye consisting of 12 episodes, and are currently involved in many other projects.

== Career ==
=== 2008–11: Early beginnings and background ===
The DhoomBros were formed in 2008 as a four-member group consisting of Hussain Asif, Shehryaar Asif, Atif Khan, and Waqas Riaz. The idea of calling themselves "DhoomBros" came within the name itself: "Dhoom" Bros (Dhoom = Blast in Urdu). The song "Dhoom Again", from the 2006 Bollywood film Dhoom 2, was a popular hit amongst South Asians but the Western world was generally unaware of it. Brothers Shehryaar and Hussain Asif performed to that song in a school talent show and received recognition from their peers and the school faculty. At this point, they called themselves the DhoomBros. This motivated them to entertain people through dance and various acts and so on June 23, 2008, the DhoomBros officially created their first YouTube channel (DhoomBros) and their official Facebook page. Atif Khan, the group's mutual friend, and Waqas Riaz, the cousin of the Asif brothers, joined later because they had similar interests. They started off making videos such as "Jimmy And Saleem" and "The Desi Mobsta Show". They also would upload videos of themselves talking about weird things that have happened to them throughout their week, either at home, at school, or in daily life.

When they started out they had nicknames, Hussain was "Desi Mobsta" or "Don". Waqas was "Daku", Sheharyar was just "Shehry". Now, Hussain has a refurbished nickname "Hussain Superstar" or "Sain", Atif is "Ati" or "Khan Saab".Shehryaar is "Shehry" or "Director Saab" or even "Teacher" and Waqas is "Wiqs".

=== 2012–13 ===
In 2012, DhoomBros videos became more frequent from Stuff Pakistanis Say, a video that comically represents common Pakistani household events and phrases, to Humsafar Best Scenes Parody, a parody based on the Pakistani drama serial, Humsafar, to the Annoying Brown Girls/Guys series, videos that show banter that stereotypical Desi teenagers seem to portray.

In October 2012, their popularity increased after the DhoomBros released their video "Desi Style", a parody based on South Korean pop artist Psy's hit single "Gangnam Style". The DhoomBros chant in English, Urdu and Punjabi about their everyday Desi American lives, consisting of waking up to their mother's voice, going to school, and greeting their grandfather, all accompanied with song and dance.

The group also experiment outside comical videos. Blessings of Ramadan is a video portraying three young men who indulge in materialistic aspects of their lives and fall astray from their spirituality by forgetting the significance of the month of Ramadan, the Muslim month of fasting and prayer. The Perfect Memory is the DhoomBros' first short film about the unexpected sacrifices one may have to make when it comes to love. Both videos were unlike the group's usual comical parodies, but were still well-garnered by audiences.

Shehryaar Asif and Waqas Riaz are known for uploading occasional video blogs that highlight various aspects of the lives of the DhoomBros, such as showing sneak peeks of their projects and being DJs at work. They also document their trips, such as to different cities in the United States of America and their stay in Pakistan. In addition to being YouTube entertainers, the DhoomBros are also DJs and often perform at weddings, mehndi events, and other parties. Apart from their comical videos, their mehndi performances have also gathered many views.

=== 2014–present ===
One of the DhoomBros' most recent popular videos is the Evolution of Bollywood Dance, inspired by Penn Masala's Evolution of Bollywood Music. In this video, the DhoomBros recreate the dancing styles that the Bollywood film industry has witnessed over the years from the golden-aged actors From Raj Kapoor to Shammi Kapoor and Jeetendra to Dharmendra and Mithun Chakraborty and to the stars of today such as Hrithik Roshan, Salman Khan, and Shah Rukh Khan.

After debuting in their first venture in the web-series iDeewane, the DhoomBros released their new drama Hum Kahan Chal Diye on 29 April 2016 featuring The DhoomBros and Divya Kalia as lead actress opposite Hussain Asif.
