= Charles Allen (cricketer) =

English cricketer

Personal information
- Full name: Charles Allen
- Born: 31 May 1878; Cirencester, England
- Died: 22 May 1958 (aged 79); Cirencester, England

Domestic team information
- Years: Team
- Gloucestershire County Cricket Club

Career statistics
Competition	FC
Matches	2
Runs scored	51
Batting average	17
100s/50s	-/-
Top score	35
Balls bowled	-
Wickets	-
Bowling average	-
5 wickets in innings	-
10 wickets in match	-
Best bowling	-
Catches/stumpings	2/-
- Source: , 5 August 2008

Charles Allen (31 May 1878 – 22 May 1958) was an English first-class cricketer who played for Gloucestershire County Cricket Club in two matches in 1909. He was born and died in Cirencester.
