= Idalia Valles =

American actress

- Born: Sandy Idalia Valles; 26 April 1993 (age 32); Houston, Texas, U.S.
- Occupation: Actress
- Years active: 2014–present

Idalia Valles is an American actress. She is well known for playing Isabela Vargas in Queen of the South.

== Early life ==
Valles was born in Houston, Texas. She studied at the Humphreys School of Musical Theatre. Soon after she finished high school she moved to Los Angeles. When she arrived in Los Angeles, she was told by her manager to use her middle name Sandy instead of her birth name Idalia, which they said was “too confusing”. She is of Latino heritage.

== Career ==
Valles was nominated for a Next Generation Indie Film Awards in 2021 for her role as Jessica in the short film For Rosa. Valles biggest role so far was playing Isabel in Queen of the South. Valles did not appear in season 4 or season 5.

== Filmography ==
=== Film ===
Year	Title	Role	Notes
2015	Camarillo St.	Sandy	Short
2020	Tempest Desert	Alice	Short
2020	For Rosa	Jessica	Short
2023	Lichemoth	Doll	Short

=== Television ===
Year	Title	Role	Notes
2014	First Jobs	Restaurant Patron	Episode: Don't Even Try to Please the Old People
2023	Real Rob	Teenage Girl	Episode: The Penis Episode Part 1
2015-2016	Con	Faye	6 episodes
2016-2018	Queen of the South	Isabela Vargas	24 episodes
2020	Bad Shorts	Katie Stotts	2 episodes
2021	Blackout	Noelle	Episode: Bonus: Vale
2024	S.W.A.T	Catalina Paulista	Episode: Honeytrap
