= Iceman Nick =

Jeweler and jewelry designer based in Houston, Texas

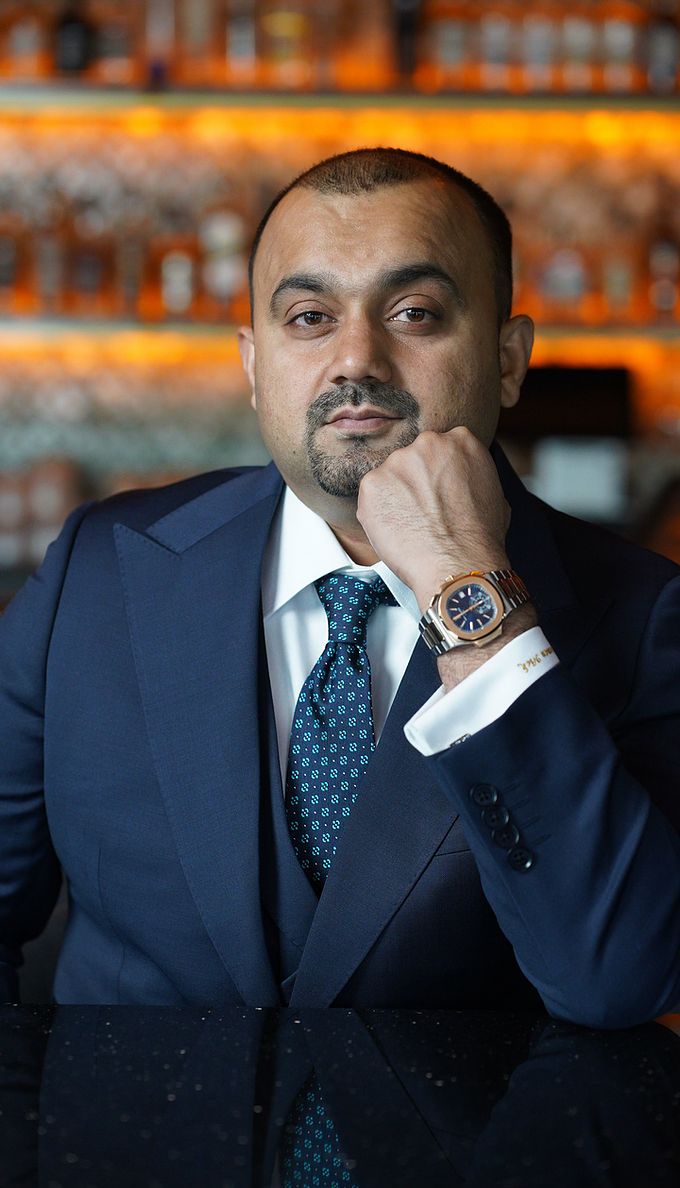
- Born: Kashif Ghafoor
- Occupations: Jeweler, Jewelry designer
- Years active: 2000-present
- Website: icemannick.com

Kashif Ghafoor, better known by his professional name "Iceman Nick", is a jeweler and jewelry designer based in Houston, Texas. He created a $400,000 Cuban link necklace for Errol Spence Jr. and a diamond-covered watch for Flo Rida. He has also previously created jewelry for LeBron James, Deshaun Watson, Megan Thee Stallion, and JaVale McGee.

== Early life and career ==
Nick was born and graduated secondary school in Pakistan. After immigrating to the United States in 2000, he met Houston jeweler "King Johnny" at a flea market; the pair later became business partners at Johnny's Custom Jewelry.
