= Jerome Cabeen =

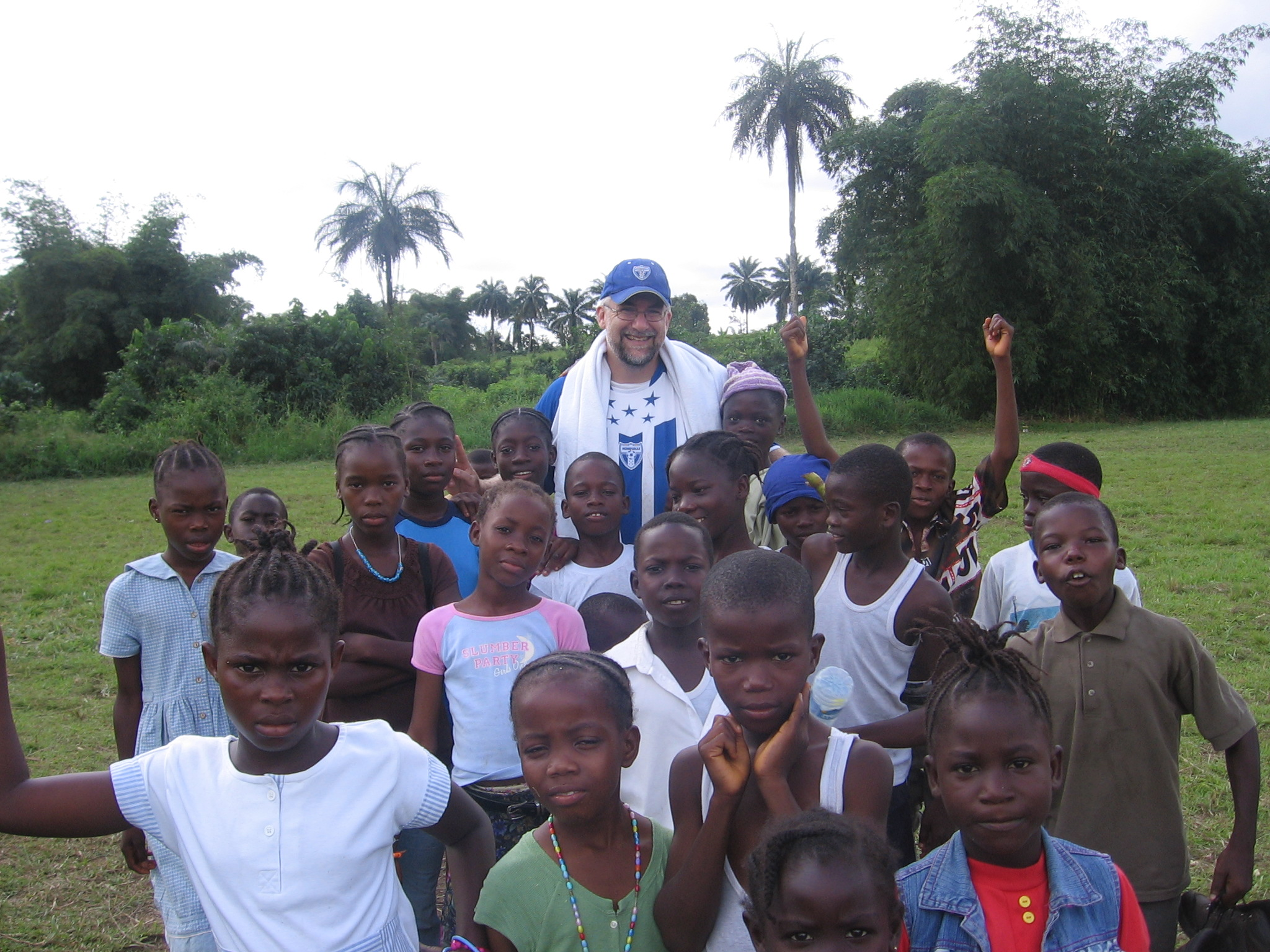
Cabeen in Blacktom Town, Liberia (Montserrado County) with mission children - 2009

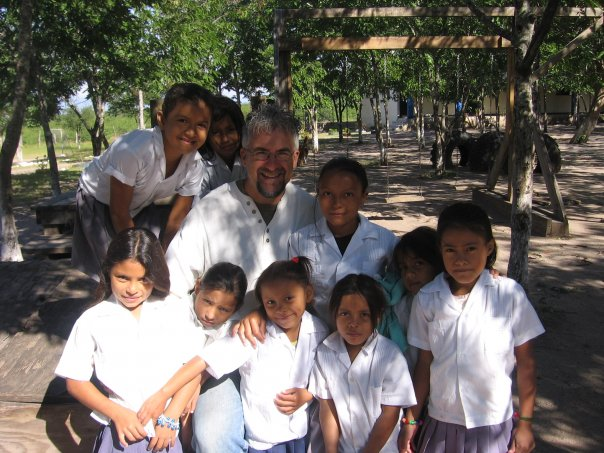
Cabeen with mission students in El Conejo, Honduras (Comayagua) - 2006

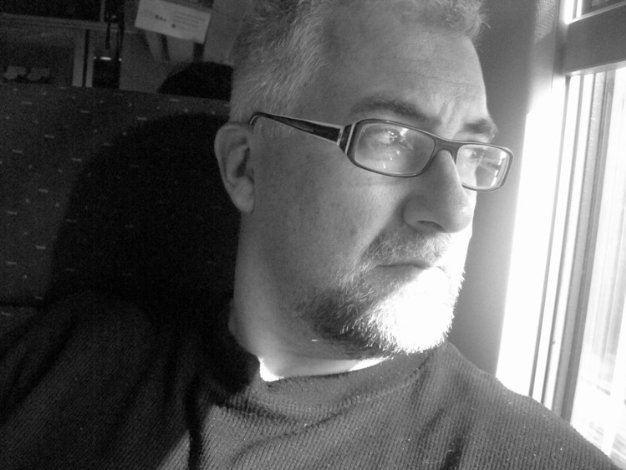
Jerome Cabeen - Belgium - 2010

Jerome Cabeen (born July 18, 1967) is an author, speaker, social justice advocate and missionary originally from Houston, Texas, in the United States. He is the author of the Amazon.com bestseller, Memoirs of a Reluctant Servant – Two Years of Triumph and Sorrow in Liberia, Africa. The book reached #1 on the Amazon.com Bestseller List in the Coastal West Africa category. Cabeen lived in Honduras in Central America from 2004 to 2008 and Liberia in West Africa from 2008 to 2010, volunteering as a missionary for Franciscan Works, a Catholic missionary organization based in Chicago. Currently he resides in Beaumont, Texas, and works for the Roman Catholic Diocese of Beaumont. He is a practicing Catholic and travels around the United States giving talks and lectures on Liberia, Honduras, social justice teachings and missionary work.

== Biography ==
Cabeen was born and raised in Houston, Texas. He graduated from Sam Houston State University in Huntsville, Texas, in 1990 with a degree in fine arts. He taught art and was a high school and AAU basketball coach in and around Houston for twelve years.

== Missionary/aid work ==
In 2004 Cabeen left the United States to begin missionary work in Honduras. While there he met his wife, Clarisa Chavarria Lara. The two were married in Tegucigalpa in June 2008, and in September of the same year they left Honduras to live and work in Liberia as Catholic missionaries. In addition to Honduras and Liberia, Cabeen has engaged in missionary and aid work in Bolivia, Costa Rica, El Salvador and Sierra Leone. The couple returned to Texas in 2010, and Cabeen was hired to work for the Catholic Diocese of Beaumont.

== Book and other published writings ==
Memoirs of a Reluctant Servant – Two Years of Triumph and Sorrow in Liberia, Africa was published in May 2011. It recounts Cabeen's and his wife's two years as missionaries in Liberia. Since its appearance on Amazon.com it has remained in the Top 100 for Coastal West African books and has placed as high as #1 on the list. In addition to addressing the missionary work he and his wife were involved in during their time in Liberia, Cabeen examines the two civil wars that plagued Liberia from 1980 until 2003 and the use of child soldiers by both government military forces and rebel fronts that invaded the country. Memoirs of a Reluctant Servant was given a very strong review by noted international author and literary critic Katherine J. Barrett of South Africa in September 2011. Cabeen has also been published in the East Texas Catholic, the newspaper that serves the Diocese of Beaumont in southeast Texas. Cabeen has written on myriad of subjects such as immigration, marriage, young adults in society and the church and Liberia.

== Interviews regarding Liberia and book ==
In August 2015 Cabeen was interviewed by the on-line literary journal KWEE-Liberian Literary Magazine. The interview appears from page 24 through page 27 in the edition. Cabeen speaks at length about his and his wife's experiences in the country from 2008 to 2010 and the impetus for writing Memoirs of a Reluctant Servant. In October 2014 Cabeen gave an on-camera interview to KBMT 12 News in Beaumont about the Ebola epidemic that was ravaging West Africa at the time, in particular Liberia. The interview was conducted by award-winning correspondent Angel San Juan. In September 2014 Cabeen and his wife, Clarisa Chavarria, sat down in Beaumont with Kara Dixon from KBTV FOX 4 News to discuss the loss of three close friends who died in the Ebola epidemic.

== Film and production credits ==
While living in Liberia, Cabeen teamed with award-winning director and producer Todd Looby on two film projects: Children of Hope: The Liberia Mission Story and the film short Son of None. Cabeen was credited with being producer for both films in addition to appearing in Son of None. At the Slamdance Film Festival in Park City, Utah (US) in 2011 Son of None won the Jury Special Award in the short film category
