= Charles A. Allen (American football) =

American football coach

Coaching career (HC unless noted)
- 1900: Alma

Administrative career (AD unless noted)
- 1900–1901: Alma

Head coaching record
- Overall: 6–2–1

Charles A. Allen was an American college football coach and athletics administrator. He served as the head football coach at Alma College in Alma, Michigan for one season, in 1900, compiling a record at Alma was 6–2–1. Allen was also the athletic director at Alma from 1900 to 1901.

== Head coaching record ==
Year	Team	Overall	Conference	Standing	Bowl/playoffs
Alma Maroon and Cream (Independent) (1900)
1900	Alma	6–2–1			
Alma:		6–2–1			
Total:		6–2–1			
