= Charles L. Allen =

American United Methodist minister

Charles Livingstone Allen (June 24, 1913 – August 30, 2005) was an American ordained United Methodist minister most notable for his work as a Pastor.

Born in Newborn, Georgia, he ministered around the state, including 1948 to 1960 at Grace United Methodist in Atlanta. During his tenure at Grace, it became the largest congregation in Georgia. In 1960, he moved to Houston, Texas, where he served at First United Methodist until 1983. While at First Methodist, it became the largest Methodist congregation in the world at 12,000 members.

Allen was also a columnist for the Atlanta Journal and Atlanta Constitution during the 1950s and after that for the Houston Chronicle. He also authored inspirational books, including God's Psychiatry and All Things Are Possible Through Prayer: The Faith-Filled Guidebook That Can Change Your Life. He pioneered American TV ministries with his WSB-Channel 2 Atlanta Sunday night services beginning in 1956.
