= Elizabeth Allen =

Elizabeth, Eliza, Liz or Beth Allen or Allan may refer to:

== Actresses ==
- Elizabeth Allen (actress) (1929–2006), American stage, film and television performer
- Beth Allen (born 1984), New Zealand stage, film and, primarily, television actress
- Elizabeth Allan (1910–1990), English stage, film and television actress
- Elizabeth Anne Allen (born 1970), American actress
- Elizabeth Bryan Allen (1904–1992), American actress

== Writers ==
- Eliza Allen (Maine) (1826–?), American memoirist
- Elizabeth Akers Allen (1832–1911), American poet, journalist and author
- Liz Allen (born 1969), Irish writer
- Elizabeth Allen (poet), poet from Australia
- Eliza Crosby Allen (1803–1848), American journal editor

== Others ==
- Beth Allen (golfer) (born 1981), American professional golfer
- Beth E. Allen, American professor of economics
- Betsy Love Allen (died 1837), Native American (Chickasaw) plantation owner who influenced the first Married Women's Property Act in the United States
- Betty Allan (1905–1952), Australian statistician
- Betty Allen (1927–2009), American operatic mezzo-soprano
- Betty Molesworth Allen (1913–2002), New Zealand botanist
- Eliza Allen (Tennessee) (1809–1861), first wife of American politician, Tennessee governor Sam Houston
- Eliza Allen (Virginia) (c. 1840–c. 1910), African American activist, clubwoman, and banker
- Elizabeth Allen Rosenbaum (born 1971), American film and television director
- Eliza Allen Starr (1824–1901), American artist known for her Catholic art
- Liz Allan (cricketer) (born 1948), former New Zealand cricketer
- Elizabeth Bonner Allen (born 1964), British documentary film maker
- Elizabeth Allen (chef) (born 1988), British/Singaporean chef
- Elizabeth Almira Allen (1854–1919), American teacher and teachers' rights advocate
- Elizabeth A. Allen (1901–1969), British social activist
- Elizabeth Fletcher Allen (1905–1994), American attorney and civil rights activist
- Elizabeth M. Allen, American political advisor who served as the White House Deputy Communications Director
- Elizabeth Bray Allen (c. 1692–?), American planter
- Elizabeth Allen (artist), English naïve artist

== Characters ==
- Elizabeth Allen, protagonist of Enid Blyton's children's novel series, The Naughtiest Girl
- Liz Allan or Allen, love interest of Marvel Comics hero Peter Parker, alias Spider-Man

== See also ==
- Allen (surname)
