= Eliza Allen =

Eliza Allen may refer to:

- Eliza Allen (Maine) (1826–after 1851), American writer from Maine
- Eliza Allen (Tennessee) (1809–1861), First Lady of Tennessee and the first wife of Sam Houston
- Eliza Allen (Virginia) (c. 1840–c. 1910), African American activist, clubwoman, and banker
- Eliza Crosby Allen (1803–1848), American journal editor

== See also ==
- Eliza Allen Starr (1824–1901), American artist, art critic, teacher, and lecturer
- Elizabeth Allen (disambiguation)
