= Mark Hill (antiques expert) =

British antiques expert

Mark Hill (born 1975) is a British antiques expert, TV presenter, author and publisher.

== Early life and education ==
Educated at Cranmore Preparatory School in West Horsley and the Royal Grammar School, Guildford, he studied History of Art & Architecture at the University of Reading.

== Career ==
In 1996, he joined Bonhams as a porter, and then became a Junior Cataloguer in their Collectors Department. He moved on to join Sotheby's in London as a Specialist in their Collectors Department.

In 2001, he joined Internet company icollector.com, rising to become Director of Auction House Services.

He has contributed to DK Collectables Price Guide (by Judith Miller) and was the co-author of the annual Miller's Collectables Price Guide from 2009 to 2017. He has also contributed to a number of other titles in association with Miller including Buy, Keep or Sell? for the Reader's Digest, Decorative Arts and DK Collectors' Guide: 20thC Glass.

In 2006, he founded his own publishing company, Mark Hill Publishing Ltd, specialising in producing books on new and developing areas in 20th century design.

He was the antiques columnist for the Daily Mail, and has lectured widely, including at the Victoria and Albert Museum in London. He is also a member of the vetting committees for a number of major international fairs, including the Olympia Fine Art & Antiques Fair and the British Antiques Dealers' Association's annual fair. He is a member of the British Antiques Dealers' Association and an accredited lecturer of The Arts Society. He was also a co-founder of Antiques Young Guns, a website and internet-based association that promotes young people working in the Antiques Trade, In 2010, he fronted National Antiques Week, organised by Antiques Are Green. In 2014 he rediscovered the copper etching plates for a series of etchings by Pierre-Georges Jeanniot inspired by Francisco Goya and Jacques Callot and covering The Rape of Belgium, which he restored and published after they were banned in 1915 and subsequently lost.

Hill predominately sells Czech and other European art glass from the mid 20th century. From January 2024 to January 2026, he co-founded and ran a boutique auction house in The Pantiles, Royal Tunbridge Wells. From 2018, he researched and helped rediscover the artwork of textile artist Elizabeth Allen (1883-1967), loaning works by her and contributing to a retrospective exhibition on her held at Compton Verney in 2026.

== Television ==
He has been a specialist in the miscellaneous and collectables teams on the BBC Antiques Roadshow since 2007, and regularly appears on the show. In 2022, he became an expert on the BBC Antiques Road Trip and regularly appears on the show. He has also co-presented four primetime television series for BBC2; Cracking Antiques with Kathryn Rayward in 2010, and Antiques Uncovered with Lucy Worsley in 2012. In 2014, he co-presented Collectaholics, a new primetime BBC2 series, with Mel Giedroyc. He co-presented a second series of Collectaholics with Jasmine Harman on primetime BBC2 in 2015.

== Other information ==
Hill lives in London with his partner. He was a Patron of the King's Lynn Arts Centre, and is now a Freeman of the City of London, and a Freeman of the City of London Worshipful Company of Arts Scholars. He is a member of the Groucho Club. He is the son of Roger Hill (1940-2025) who was the Chief Mechanic for the Tyrrell F1 Team.

== Publications ==
Published via Mark Hill Publishing Ltd

- Fat Lava: West German Ceramics of the 1960s & 70s (2006, second edition 2010, third revised and enlarged edition 2012, fourth revised and enlarged edition 2016, fifth revised edition 2018) ISBN 978-0-9929689-1-5
- Michael Harris: Mdina Glass & Isle of Wight Studio Glass (2006) ISBN 978-09552865-1-3
- Frank Thrower & Dartington Glass (2007) ISBN 978-0-9552865-2-0
- Hi Sklo Lo Sklo: Post War Czech Glass Design (2008) ISBN 978-0-9552865-3-7
- The Journal of the Glass Association (2008)
- Caithness Glass: Loch, Heather & Peat (2011) ISBN 978-0-9552865-5-1
- Alla Moda: Italian Ceramics of the 1950s–70s (2012) ISBN 978-0-9552865-7-5
- The Canny Collector (2013) ISBN 978-0-9552865-8-2
- Berànek & Skrdlovice: Legends of Czech Glass by Robert Bevan Jones & Jindrich Parik (General Editor & Publisher) ISBN 978-0-9552865-9-9
- The Horrors of War by Pierre-Georges Jeanniot (2014) ISBN 978-0-9929689-0-8
- Sklo: Czech Glass Design from the 1950s–70s (2017) ISBN 978-0-9929689-2-2

Published by Miller's, an imprint of Octopus Books (a division of Hachette Livre):

- Miller's Collectables Handbook & Price Guide 2014–2015 ISBN 9781845337308
- Miller's Collectables Handbook 2012–13 ISBN 9781845336356
- Miller's Collectables Handbook 2010–11 ISBN 9781845335144
- Miller's Collectables Price Guide 2009 ISBN 9781845334420

Published by Mitchell Beazley, an imprint of Octopus Books (a division of Hachette Livre:

- Cracking Antiques (2010) ISBN 978-1-8453355-6-4

Published by Dorling Kindersley:

- DK Collectables Price Guide 2008 ISBN 9781405322171

Published by Lund Humphries

- Sam Herman (Contributing Author) (2019) ISBN 9781848223257
