= May 3 =

May 3 this year in various calendars
- Sunday, 3 May 2026
Akan	Kwakwasi
Armenian	17 Mareri 1475
Aztec	Xocotlhuetzi 13, 10 Cipactli
Babylonian	15 Nisanu, 2337 SE
Balinese pawukon	Luang, Pepet, Beteng, Sri, Keliwon, Was, Redite of Taulu, Ludra, Tulus, Duka
Bengali	20 Boisakh, BS 1433
Chinese	Yin Fire Ox・Room Mansion; Fire Horse Year, Month 3, Day 17 (Guyu, 2 days until Lixia)
Common Era	3 May 2026 CE
Coptic	25 Parmouti, AM 1742
Egyptian	17 Thoth, 2775 NE
Ethiopian	25 Miyāzyā, 2018 Amätä Məhrät
French Republican	Décade II, Quartidi de Floréal de l'Année 234 de la République
Gregorian	3 May, AD 2026
Hebrew	16 Iyar, AM 5786; Omer 31
Hindu	Anurādhā・Varīyas; Solar: 20 Vaiśākha, 1948 SE; Lunisolar: Dvitīyā, Kṛishna pakṣa of Vaiśākha, 2083 VE; Rāudra・5127 KY・1,872,698
Icelandic	Sunnudagur, 11 Harpa 2026
Islamic	16 Dhu al-Qi'dah, AH 1447 (using tabular method)
ISO week date	2026-W18-7
Japanese	17 Yayoi, Reiwa 8 (Kokuu, 2 days until Rikka)
Julian	20 April, AD 2026 (AM 7534)
Julian day	2461164
Korean	17 Yongdal, 4359 DE
Maya	13.0.13.10.1; 14 Uo, 10 Imix
Roman	ante diem XII Kalendas Maias, MMDCCLXXIX AUC
Solar Hijri	13 Ordibehesht, SH 1405
Tibetan	17 nag pa, me pho rta 2153 or 1772 or 1000

<<	May					>>
Su	Mo	Tu	We	Th	Fr	Sa
					1	2
3	4	5	6	7	8	9
10	11	12	13	14	15	16
17	18	19	20	21	22	23
24	25	26	27	28	29	30
31
2026

May 3 in recent years
2026 (Sunday)
2025 (Saturday)
2024 (Friday)
2023 (Wednesday)
2022 (Tuesday)
2021 (Monday)
2020 (Sunday)
2019 (Friday)
2018 (Thursday)
2017 (Wednesday)

May 3 is the 123rd day of the year (124th in leap years) in the Gregorian calendar; 242 days remain until the end of the year.

== Events ==
=== Pre-1600 ===
- 752 – Mayan king Bird Jaguar IV of Yaxchilan in modern-day Chiapas, Mexico, assumes the throne.
- 996 – German king Otto III chooses his cousin Bruno of Carinthia as pope following the death of Pope John XV. Bruno becomes pope under the name Gregory V.
- 1481 – The largest of three earthquakes strikes the island of Rhodes and causes an estimated 30,000 casualties.
- 1491 – Kongo monarch Nkuwu Nzinga is baptised by Portuguese missionaries, adopting the baptismal name of João I.
- 1568 – Angered by the brutal onslaught of Spanish troops at Fort Caroline, a French force burns the San Mateo fort and massacres hundreds of Spaniards.

=== 1601–1900 ===
- 1616 – Treaty of Loudun ends a French civil war.
- 1715 – A total solar eclipse is visible across northern Europe and northern Asia, as predicted by Edmond Halley to within four minutes accuracy.
- 1791 – The Constitution of May 3 (the first modern constitution in Europe) is proclaimed by the Sejm of Polish–Lithuanian Commonwealth.
- 1802 – Washington, D.C. is incorporated as a city after Congress abolishes the Board of Commissioners, the District's founding government. The "City of Washington" is given a mayor-council form of government.
- 1808 – Finnish War: Sweden loses the fortress of Sveaborg to Russia.
- 1808 – Peninsular War: The Madrid rebels who rose up on May 2 are executed near Príncipe Pío hill.
- 1811 – The Anglo-Portuguese army under Lord Wellington tries to halt a larger French army under Marshal Masséna marching to relieve Almeida in the Battle of Fuentes de Oñoro. After intense fighting, the French are repulsed.
- 1815 – Neapolitan War: Joachim Murat, King of Naples, is defeated by the Austrians at the Battle of Tolentino, the decisive engagement of the war.
- 1830 – The Canterbury and Whitstable Railway is opened; it is the first steam-hauled passenger railway to issue season tickets and include a tunnel.
- 1837 – The University of Athens is founded in Athens, Greece.
- 1848 – The boar-crested Anglo-Saxon Benty Grange helmet is discovered in a barrow on the Benty Grange farm in Derbyshire.
- 1849 – The May Uprising in Dresden begins: The last of the German revolutions of 1848–49.
- 1855 – American adventurer William Walker departs from San Francisco with about 60 men to conquer Nicaragua.

=== 1901–present ===
- 1901 – The Great Fire of 1901 begins in Jacksonville, Florida.
- 1913 – Raja Harishchandra, the first full-length Indian feature film, is released, marking the beginning of the Indian film industry.
- 1920 – A Bolshevik coup fails in the Democratic Republic of Georgia.
- 1921 – Ireland is partitioned under British law by the Government of Ireland Act 1920, creating Northern Ireland and Southern Ireland.
- 1921 – West Virginia becomes the first state to legislate a broad sales tax, but does not implement it until a number of years later due to enforcement issues.
- 1928 – The Jinan incident begins with the deaths of twelve Japanese civilians by Chinese forces in Jinan, China, which leads to Japanese retaliation and the deaths of over 2,000 Chinese civilians in the following days.
- 1939 – The All India Forward Bloc is formed by Netaji Subhas Chandra Bose.
- 1942 – World War II: Japanese naval troops invade Tulagi Island in the Solomon Islands during the first part of Operation Mo that results in the Battle of the Coral Sea between Japanese forces and forces from the United States and Australia.
- 1945 – World War II: Sinking of the prison ships Cap Arcona, Thielbek and Deutschland by the Royal Air Force in Lübeck Bay, resulting in more than 7,000 deaths.
- 1947 – New post-war Japanese constitution goes into effect.
- 1948 – The U.S. Supreme Court rules in Shelley v. Kraemer that covenants prohibiting the sale of real estate to blacks and other minorities are legally unenforceable.
- 1951 – London's Royal Festival Hall opens with the Festival of Britain.
- 1951 – The United States Senate Committee on Armed Services and United States Senate Committee on Foreign Relations begin their closed door hearings into the relief of Douglas MacArthur by U.S. President Harry Truman.
- 1952 – Lieutenant Colonels Joseph O. Fletcher and William P. Benedict of the United States land a plane at the North Pole.
- 1952 – The Kentucky Derby is televised nationally for the first time, on the CBS network.
- 1953 – Two men are rescued from a semitrailer that crashed over the side of the Pit River Bridge before it fell into the Sacramento River. Amateur photographer Virginia Schau photographs "Rescue on Pit River Bridge", the first and only winning submission for the Pulitzer Prize for Photography to have been taken by a woman.
- 1957 – Walter O'Malley, the owner of the Brooklyn Dodgers, agrees to move the team from Brooklyn to Los Angeles.
- 1963 – The police force in Birmingham, Alabama switches tactics and responds with violent force to stop the "Birmingham campaign" protesters. Images of the violent suppression are transmitted worldwide, bringing new-found attention to the civil rights movement.
- 1968 – Eighty-five people are killed when Braniff International Airways Flight 352 crashes near Dawson, Texas.
- 1971 – Erich Honecker becomes First Secretary of the Socialist Unity Party of Germany, remaining in power until 1989.
- 1978 – The first unsolicited bulk commercial email (which would later become known as "spam") is sent by a Digital Equipment Corporation marketing representative to every ARPANET address on the west coast of the United States.
- 1979 – The Conservative Party wins the United Kingdom general election. The following day, Margaret Thatcher becomes the first female British Prime Minister.
- 1986 – Twenty-one people are killed and forty-one are injured after a bomb explodes on Air Lanka Flight 512 at Colombo airport in Sri Lanka.
- 1987 – A crash by Bobby Allison at the Talladega Superspeedway, Alabama fencing at the start-finish line would lead NASCAR to develop the restrictor plate for the following season both at Daytona International Speedway and Talladega.
- 1999 – The southwestern portion of Oklahoma City is devastated by an F5 tornado, killing forty-five people, injuring 665, and causing $1 billion in damage. The tornado is one of 66 from the 1999 Oklahoma tornado outbreak. This tornado also produces the highest wind speed ever recorded, measured at 484 ± 32 kilometres per hour (301 ± 20 mph). In meteorology, the term "May 3" is synonymous with the F5 tornado.
- 1999 – Infiltration of Pakistani soldiers on Indian side results in the Kargil War.
- 2000 – The sport of geocaching begins, with the first cache placed and the coordinates from a GPS posted on Usenet.
- 2001 – The United States loses its seat on the U.N. Human Rights Commission for the first time since the commission was formed in 1947.
- 2006 – Armavia Flight 967 crashes into the Black Sea near Sochi International Airport in Sochi, Russia, killing 113 people.
- 2007 – The three-year-old British girl Madeleine McCann disappears in Praia da Luz, Portugal, starting "the most heavily reported missing-person case in modern history".
- 2015 – Two gunmen launch an attempted attack on an anti-Islam event in Garland, Texas, which was held in response to the Charlie Hebdo shooting.
- 2016 – Eighty-eight thousand people are evacuated from their homes in Fort McMurray, Alberta, Canada as a wildfire rips through the community, destroying approximately 2,400 homes and buildings.
- 2021 – Twenty-six people are killed and ninety-eight are injured after an elevated section of the Mexico City Metro collapses.
- 2023 – Nine students and a security guard are killed in the Belgrade school shooting, the first attack of its kind in Serbia.
- 2023 - Ethnic violence breaks out between the Meitei and the Kuki Zo people in the state of Manipur.

== Births ==
=== Pre-1600 ===
- 490 – Kʼan Joy Chitam I, ruler of Palenque (died 565)
- 612 – Constantine III, Byzantine emperor (died 641)
- 1238 – Emilia Bicchieri, Italian saint (died 1314)
- 1276 – Louis, Count of Évreux, son of King Philip III of France (died 1319)
- 1415 – Cecily Neville, Duchess of York (died 1495)
- 1428 – Pedro González de Mendoza, Spanish cardinal (died 1495)
- 1446 – Margaret of York (died 1503)
- 1461 – Raffaele Riario, Italian cardinal (died 1521)
- 1469 – Niccolò Machiavelli, Italian historian and philosopher (died 1527)
- 1479 – Henry V, Duke of Mecklenburg (died 1552)
- 1481 – Juana de la Cruz Vázquez Gutiérrez, Spanish abbess of the Franciscan Third Order Regular (died 1534)
- 1536 – Stephan Praetorius, German theologian (died 1603)

=== 1601–1900 ===
- 1632 – Catherine of St. Augustine, French-Canadian nurse and candidate for sainthood, founded the Hôtel-Dieu de Québec (died 1668)
- 1662 – Matthäus Daniel Pöppelmann, German architect, designed the Pillnitz Castle (died 1736)
- 1678 – Amaro Pargo, Spanish corsair (died 1747)
- 1695 – Henri Pitot, French physicist and engineer, invented the Pitot tube (died 1771)
- 1729 – Florian Leopold Gassmann, Czech composer (died 1774)
- 1761 – August von Kotzebue, German playwright and author (died 1819)
- 1764 – Princess Élisabeth of France (died 1794)
- 1768 – Charles Tennant, Scottish chemist and businessman (died 1838)
- 1783 – José de la Riva Agüero, Peruvian soldier and politician, 1st President of Peru and 2nd President of North Peru (died 1858)
- 1814 – Adams George Archibald, Canadian lawyer and politician, 4th Lieutenant Governor of Nova Scotia (died 1892)
- 1826 – Charles XV of Sweden (died 1872)
- 1844 – Richard D'Oyly Carte, English talent agent and composer (died 1901)
- 1849 – Jacob Riis, Danish-American journalist and photographer (died 1914)
- 1849 – Bernhard von Bülow, German soldier and politician, Chancellor of Germany (died 1929)
- 1850 – Johnny Ringo US criminal and gunfighter (died 1882)
- 1854 – George Gore, American baseball player and manager (died 1933)
- 1859 – August Herrmann, American executive in Major League Baseball (died 1931)
- 1860 – Vito Volterra, Italian mathematician and physicist (died 1940)
- 1860 – John Scott Haldane, British physiologist and researcher (died 1936)
- 1867 – Andy Bowen, American boxer (died 1894)
- 1867 – J. T. Hearne, English cricketer (died 1944)
- 1870 – Princess Helena Victoria of Schleswig-Holstein (died 1948)
- 1871 – Emmett Dalton, American criminal (died 1937)
- 1873 – Pavlo Skoropadskyi, German-Ukrainian general and politician, Hetman of Ukraine (died 1945)
- 1874 – François Coty, French businessman and publisher, founded Coty (died 1934)
- 1874 – Vagn Walfrid Ekman, Swedish oceanographer and academic (died 1954)
- 1877 – Karl Abraham, German psychoanalyst and author (died 1925)
- 1879 – Fergus McMaster, Australian businessman and soldier, co-founded Qantas (died 1950)
- 1886 – Marcel Dupré, French organist and composer (died 1971)
- 1887 – Marika Kotopouli, Greek actress (died 1954)
- 1889 – Beulah Bondi, American actress (died 1981)
- 1889 – Gottfried Fuchs, German-Canadian Olympic soccer player (died 1972)
- 1891 – Tadeusz Peiper, Polish poet and critic (died 1969)
- 1891 – Eppa Rixey, American baseball pitcher (died 1963)
- 1892 – George Paget Thomson, English physicist and academic, Nobel Prize laureate (died 1975)
- 1892 – Jacob Viner, Canadian-American economist and academic (died 1970)
- 1893 – Konstantine Gamsakhurdia, Georgian author (died 1975)
- 1895 – Cornelius Van Til, Dutch philosopher, theologian, and apologist (died 1987)
- 1896 – Karl Allmenröder, German soldier and pilot (died 1917)
- 1896 – V. K. Krishna Menon, Indian lawyer, jurist, and politician, Indian Minister of Defence (died 1974)
- 1896 – Dodie Smith, English author and playwright (died 1990)
- 1897 – William Joseph Browne, Canadian lawyer and politician, 20th Solicitor General of Canada (died 1989)
- 1898 – Septima Poinsette Clark, American educator and activist (died 1987)
- 1898 – Golda Meir, Ukrainian-Israeli educator and politician, 4th Prime Minister of Israel (died 1978)

=== 1901–present ===
- 1902 – Alfred Kastler, German-French physicist and poet, Nobel Prize laureate (died 1984)
- 1903 – Bing Crosby, American singer and actor (died 1977)
- 1905 – Red Ruffing, American baseball pitcher and coach (died 1986)
- 1906 – Mary Astor, American actress (died 1987)
- 1906 – Anna Roosevelt Halsted, American journalist and author (died 1975)
- 1910 – Norman Corwin, American screenwriter and producer (died 2011)
- 1912 – Virgil Fox, American organist and composer (died 1980)
- 1912 – May Sarton, American poet, novelist and memoirist (died 1995)
- 1913 – William Inge, American playwright and novelist (died 1973)
- 1914 – Georges-Emmanuel Clancier, French journalist, author, and poet (died 2018)
- 1915 – Stu Hart, Canadian wrestler and trainer, founded Stampede Wrestling (died 2003)
- 1917 – Betty Comden, American screenwriter and librettist (died 2006)
- 1917 – George Gaynes, Finnish-American actor (died 2016)
- 1917 – Kiro Gligorov, Macedonian politician and first president of the Republic of Macedonia (died 2012)
- 1918 – Ted Bates, English footballer and manager (died 2003)
- 1919 – Pete Seeger, American singer-songwriter, guitarist, and activist (died 2014)
- 1920 – John Lewis, American pianist and composer (died 2001)
- 1921 – Sugar Ray Robinson, American boxer (died 1989)
- 1922 – Len Shackleton, English footballer and journalist (died 2000)
- 1923 – Ralph Hall, American lieutenant, lawyer, and politician (died 2019)
- 1923 – Clara Luper, American civic leader and civil rights activist (died 2011)
- 1924 – Yehuda Amichai, German-Israeli author and poet (died 2000)
- 1924 – Ken Tyrrell, English race car driver, founded Tyrrell Racing (died 2001)
- 1925 – Marilyn Fisher Lundy, American businesswoman and philanthropist (died 2014)
- 1928 – Dave Dudley, American singer-songwriter (died 2003)
- 1928 – Jacques-Louis Lions, French mathematician (died 2001)
- 1929 – Helen Walulik, American baseball player (died 2012)
- 1930 – Juan Gelman, Argentinian poet and author (died 2014)
- 1932 – Robert Osborne, American actor and historian (died 2017)
- 1933 – James Brown, American singer-songwriter, producer, and actor (died 2006)
- 1933 – Steven Weinberg, American physicist and academic, Nobel Prize laureate (died 2021)
- 1934 – Henry Cooper, English boxer and sportscaster (died 2011)
- 1934 – Georges Moustaki, Egyptian-French singer-songwriter and guitarist (died 2013)
- 1934 – Frankie Valli, American singer and actor
- 1935 – Ron Popeil, American businessman, founded the Ronco Company (died 2021)
- 1938 – Omar Abdel-Rahman, Egyptian terrorist (died 2017)
- 1940 – David Koch, American engineer, businessman, and philanthropist (died 2019)
- 1940 – Clemens Westerhof, Dutch footballer and manager
- 1941 – Nona Gaprindashvili, Georgian chess player, Women's World Champion, 1962-1978
- 1942 – Věra Čáslavská, Czech gymnast and coach (died 2016)
- 1942 – Butch Otter, American soldier and politician, 32nd Governor of Idaho
- 1943 – Jim Risch, American lawyer and politician, 31st Governor of Idaho
- 1943 – Vicente Saldivar, Mexican boxer (died 1985)
- 1945 – Davey Lopes, American baseball player, coach, and manager
- 1946 – Norm Chow, American football player and coach
- 1946 – Greg Gumbel, American sportscaster (died 2024)
- 1947 – Doug Henning, Canadian magician (died 2000)
- 1948 – Denis Cosgrove, British-American academic and geographer (died 2008)
- 1949 – Liam Donaldson, English physician and academic
- 1949 – Ron Wyden, American academic and politician
- 1950 – Mary Hopkin, Welsh singer-songwriter
- 1951 – Christopher Cross, American singer-songwriter and producer
- 1951 – Ashok Gehlot, Indian politician, 21st Chief Minister of Rajasthan
- 1951 – Tatyana Tolstaya, Russian author and publicist
- 1952 – Chuck Baldwin, American pastor and politician
- 1952 – Joseph W. Tobin, American cardinal
- 1954 – Angela Bofill, American singer-songwriter (died 2024)
- 1955 – Stephen D. M. Brown, British geneticist
- 1955 – David Hookes, Australian cricketer, coach, and sportscaster (died 2004)
- 1955 – Garnet Rogers, Canadian folk singer-songwriter
- 1957 – Rod Langway, Taiwanese-American ice hockey player and coach
- 1958 – Bill Sienkiewicz, American author and illustrator
- 1958 – Sandi Toksvig, Danish-English comedian, writer, and broadcaster
- 1959 – Uma Bharti, Indian activist and politician, 16th Chief Minister of Madhya Pradesh
- 1959 – Ben Elton, English actor, director, and screenwriter
- 1960 – Kathy Smallwood-Cook, English sprinter and educator
- 1961 – Steve McClaren, English footballer and manager
- 1961 – David Vitter, American lawyer and politician
- 1961 – Leyla Zana, Kurdish activist and politician
- 1963 – Jeff Hornacek, American basketball player and coach
- 1963 – Mona Siddiqui, Pakistani-Scottish journalist and academic
- 1964 – Sterling Campbell, American drummer and songwriter
- 1964 – Ron Hextall, Canadian-American ice hockey player and manager
- 1965 – Ignatius Aphrem II, Syrian patriarch
- 1965 – Mark Cousins, Northern Irish director, writer, cinematographer
- 1965 – John Jensen, Danish footballer and coach
- 1965 – Mikhail Prokhorov, Russian businessman
- 1967 – Daniel Anderson, Australian rugby league coach and manager
- 1967 – Kenny Hotz, Canadian producer, writer, director, actor, and comedian
- 1971 – Douglas Carswell, British politician, the first elected MP for the UK Independence Party
- 1972 – Steve Barclay, English lawyer and politician
- 1973 – Jamie Baulch, Welsh sprinter and television host
- 1975 – Willie Geist, American television journalist and host
- 1975 – Christina Hendricks, American actress and model
- 1975 – Dulé Hill, American actor
- 1975 – Sanath Nishantha, Sri Lankan politician (died 2024)
- 1976 – Jeff Halpern, American ice hockey player
- 1976 – Brad Scott, Australian footballer and coach
- 1976 – Chris Scott, Australian footballer and coach
- 1977 – Eric Church, American country music singer-songwriter
- 1977 – Ryan Dempster, Canadian baseball player and sportscaster
- 1977 – Tyronn Lue, American basketball player and coach
- 1977 – Ben Olsen, American soccer player and coach
- 1978 – Paul Banks, English-American singer-songwriter and guitarist
- 1978 – Lawrence Tynes, American football player
- 1981 – Father John Misty, American musician
- 1982 – Igor Olshansky, Ukrainian-American football player
- 1983 – Joseph Addai, American football player
- 1983 – Romeo Castelen, Dutch footballer
- 1983 – Márton Fülöp, Hungarian footballer (died 2015)
- 1985 – Ezequiel Lavezzi, Argentinian footballer
- 1985 – Robin Tonniau, Belgian politician
- 1986 – Homer Bailey, American baseball player
- 1986 – Pom Klementieff, French actress
- 1987 – Damla Sönmez, Turkish actress
- 1988 – Ben Revere, American baseball player
- 1988 – Paddy Holohan, Irish mixed martial artist
- 1989 – Jesse Bromwich, New Zealand rugby league player
- 1989 – Katinka Hosszú, Hungarian swimmer
- 1990 – Harvey Guillén, American actor
- 1990 – Brooks Koepka, American golfer
- 1990 – James Pattinson, Australian cricketer
- 1991 – Carlo Acutis, Italian Catholic saint
- 1991 – Samuel Seo, South Korean musician
- 1995 – Ivan Bukavshin, Russian chess player (died 2016)
- 1995 – Anwar El Ghazi, Dutch footballer
- 1995 – Austin Meadows, American baseball player
- 1996 – Mary Cain, American runner
- 1996 – Alex Iwobi, Nigerian footballer
- 1996 – Domantas Sabonis, Lithuanian-American basketball player
- 1996 – Noah Munck, American actor
- 1997 – Desiigner, American rapper
- 1997 – Dwayne Haskins, American football player (died 2022)
- 1999 – Tom Hartley, English cricketer
- 1999 – Ella Langley, American singer-songwriter
- 2001 – Rachel Zegler, American actress and singer
- 2003 – Florian Wirtz, German footballer

== Deaths ==
=== Pre-1600 ===
- 678 – Tōchi, Japanese princess
- 738 – Uaxaclajuun Ub'aah K'awiil, Mayan ruler (ajaw)
- 1152 – Matilda of Boulogne, Queen Consort of England and Countess of Boulogne (born 1105)
- 1270 – Béla IV of Hungary (born 1206)
- 1294 – John I, Duke of Brabant (born 1252)
- 1330 – Alexios II Megas Komnenos, Emperor of Trebizond (born 1282)
- 1410 – Antipope Alexander V
- 1481 – Mehmed the Conqueror, Ottoman sultan (born 1432)
- 1501 – John Devereux, 9th Baron Ferrers of Chartley, English Baron (born 1463)
- 1524 – Richard Grey, 3rd Earl of Kent, English peer (born 1481)
- 1534 – Juana de la Cruz Vazquez Gutierrez, Spanish Roman Catholic nun and venerable (born 1481)
- 1589 – Julius, Duke of Brunswick-Lüneburg (born 1528)

=== 1601–1900 ===
- 1606 – Henry Garnet, English priest and author (born 1555)
- 1621 – Elizabeth Bacon, English Tudor gentlewoman (born 1541)
- 1679 – James Sharp, Scottish archbishop (born 1613)
- 1693 – Claude de Rouvroy, duc de Saint-Simon, French courtier (born 1607)
- 1704 – Heinrich Ignaz Franz Biber, Czech-Austrian violinist and composer (born 1644)
- 1724 – John Leverett the Younger, American lawyer, academic, and politician (born 1662)
- 1750 – John Willison, Scottish minister and author (born 1680)
- 1752 – Samuel Ogle, English-American captain and politician, 5th Governor of Restored Proprietary Government (born 1692)
- 1758 – Pope Benedict XIV (born 1675)
- 1763 – George Psalmanazar, French-English author (born 1679)
- 1764 – Francesco Algarotti, Italian philosopher, poet, and critic (born 1712)
- 1779 – John Winthrop, American mathematician, physicist, and astronomer (born 1714)
- 1793 – Martin Gerbert, German historian and theologian (born 1720)
- 1839 – Ferdinando Paer, Italian composer (born 1771)
- 1856 – Adolphe Adam, French composer and critic (born 1803)
- 1856 – Louis-Étienne Saint-Denis, Arab-French servant to Napoleon I (born 1788)
- 1882 – Leonidas Smolents, Austrian–Greek general and army minister (born 1806)

=== 1901–present ===
- 1910 – Howard Taylor Ricketts, American pathologist (born 1871)
- 1916 – Tom Clarke, executed Irish rebel (born 1858)
- 1916 – Thomas MacDonagh, executed Irish poet and rebel (born 1878)
- 1916 – Patrick Pearse, executed Irish teacher and rebel leader (born 1879)
- 1918 – Charlie Soong, Chinese businessman and missionary (born 1863)
- 1919 – Elizabeth Almira Allen, American educator (born 1854)
- 1921 – Théodore Pilette, Belgian race car driver (born 1883)
- 1925 – Clément Ader, French engineer, designed the Ader Avion III (born 1841)
- 1932 – Charles Fort, American journalist and author (born 1874)
- 1935 – Jessie Willcox Smith, American illustrator (born 1863)
- 1939 – Madeleine Desroseaux, French author and poet (born 1873)
- 1942 – Thorvald Stauning, Danish politician, 24th Prime Minister of Denmark (born 1873)
- 1943 – Harry Miller, American engineer (born 1875)
- 1948 – Ernst Tandefelt, Finnish assassin of Heikki Ritavuori (born 1876)
- 1949 – Fanny Walden, English footballer and cricketer (born 1888)
- 1958 – Frank Foster, English cricketer (born 1889)
- 1969 – Zakir Husain, Indian academic and politician, 3rd President of India (born 1897)
- 1970 – Cemil Gürgen Erlertürk, Turkish footballer, coach, and pilot (born 1918)
- 1972 – Kenneth Bailey, Australian lawyer and diplomat, Australian High Commissioner to Canada (born 1898)
- 1972 – Emil Breitkreutz, American runner and coach (born 1883)
- 1972 – Bruce Cabot, American actor (born 1904)
- 1978 – Bill Downs, American journalist (born 1914)
- 1981 – Nargis, Indian actress (born 1929)
- 1986 – Robert Alda, American actor (born 1914)
- 1987 – Dalida, Italian singer, actress, dancer, and model (born 1933)
- 1988 – Lev Pontryagin, Russian mathematician and academic (born 1908)
- 1989 – Christine Jorgensen, American trans woman (born 1926)
- 1991 – Jerzy Kosiński, Polish-American novelist and screenwriter (born 1933)
- 1992 – George Murphy, American actor, dancer, and politician (born 1902)
- 1996 – Dimitri Fampas, Greek guitarist, composer, and educator (born 1921)
- 1996 – Alex Kellner, American baseball player (born 1924)
- 1996 – Jack Weston, American actor (born 1924)
- 1996 – Keith Daniel Williams, American rapist and triple murderer (born 1947)
- 1997 – Sébastien Enjolras, French race car driver (born 1976)
- 1997 – Narciso Yepes, Spanish guitarist and composer (born 1927)
- 1998 – Gene Raymond, American actor (born 1908)
- 1999 – Joe Adcock, American baseball player and manager (born 1927)
- 1999 – Steve Chiasson, Canadian-American ice hockey player (born 1967)
- 1999 – Godfrey Evans, English cricketer (born 1920)
- 2000 – Júlia Báthory, Hungarian glass designer (born 1901)
- 2000 – John Joseph O'Connor, American cardinal (born 1920)
- 2002 – Barbara Castle, Baroness Castle of Blackburn, English politician, First Secretary of State (born 1910)
- 2002 – Yevgeny Svetlanov, Russian pianist, composer, and conductor (born 1928)
- 2003 – Suzy Parker, American model and actress (born 1932)
- 2004 – Ken Downing, English race car driver (born 1917)
- 2004 – Darrell Johnson, American baseball player, coach, and manager (born 1928)
- 2006 – Karel Appel, Dutch painter, sculptor, and poet (born 1921)
- 2006 – Pramod Mahajan, Indian politician (born 1949)
- 2006 – Earl Woods, American colonel, baseball player, and author (born 1932)
- 2007 – Warja Honegger-Lavater, Swiss illustrator (born 1913)
- 2007 – Wally Schirra, American captain, pilot, and astronaut (born 1923)
- 2007 – Knock Yokoyama, Japanese politician (born 1932)
- 2008 – Leopoldo Calvo-Sotelo, Spanish engineer and politician, Prime Minister of Spain (born 1926)
- 2009 – Renée Morisset, Canadian pianist (born 1928)
- 2009 – Ram Balkrushna Shewalkar, Indian author and critic (born 1931)
- 2010 – Roy Carrier, American accordion player (born 1947)
- 2010 – Peter O'Donnell, English soldier and author (born 1920)
- 2010 – Guenter Wendt, German-American engineer (born 1923)
- 2011 – Jackie Cooper, American actor, television director, producer and executive (born 1922)
- 2011 – Sergo Kotrikadze, Georgian footballer and manager (born 1936)
- 2011 – Thanasis Veggos, Greek actor and director (born 1927)
- 2012 – Jorge Illueca, Panamanian politician, 30th President of Panama (born 1918)
- 2012 – Felix Werder, German-Australian composer, conductor, and critic (born 1922)
- 2013 – Joe Astroth, American baseball player (born 1922)
- 2013 – Herbert Blau, American engineer and academic (born 1926)
- 2013 – Cedric Brooks, Jamaican-American saxophonist and flute player (born 1943)
- 2013 – Keith Carter, American swimmer and soldier (born 1924)
- 2013 – Brad Drewett, Australian tennis player and sportscaster (born 1958)
- 2013 – David Morris Kern, American pharmacist, co-invented Orajel (born 1909)
- 2013 – Curtis Rouse, American football player (born 1960)
- 2013 – Branko Vukelić, Croatian politician, 11th Minister of Defence for Croatia (born 1958)
- 2014 – Gary Becker, American economist and academic, Nobel Prize laureate (born 1930)
- 2014 – Francisco Icaza, Mexican painter (born 1930)
- 2014 – Jim Oberstar, American educator and politician (born 1934)
- 2015 – Revaz Chkheidze, Georgian director and screenwriter (born 1926)
- 2015 – Danny Jones, Welsh rugby player (born 1986)
- 2015 – Warren Smith, American golfer and coach (born 1915)
- 2016 – Ian Deans, Canadian politician (born 1937)
- 2016 – Jadranka Stojaković, Yugoslav singer-songwriter (born 1950)
- 2017 – Daliah Lavi, Israeli actress, singer and model (born 1942)
- 2020 – Victoria Barbă, Moldovan animated film director (born 1926)
- 2020 – Dave Greenfield, English rock keyboardist (born 1949)
- 2021 – Lloyd Price, American R&B vocalist (born 1933)
- 2024 – Dick Rutan, American military aviator and officer (born 1938)

== Holidays and observances ==
- Christian feast day:
  - Abhai (Syriac Orthodox Church)
  - Blessed Emilia Bicchieri
  - Juvenal of Narni
  - Marie-Léonie Paradis
  - Moura and Timothy (Catholic and Coptic Church)
  - Philip and James the Lesser
  - Pope Alexander I
  - Sarah the Martyr (Coptic Church)
  - The Most Holy Virgin Mary, Queen of Poland
  - Theodosius of Kiev (Catholic and Eastern Orthodox Church)
  - May 3 (Eastern Orthodox liturgics)
- Constitution Memorial Day (Japan)
- Constitution Day (Poland)
- Finding of the Holy Cross-related observances:
  - Fiesta de las Cruces (Spain and Hispanic America)
- International Sun Day
- World Press Freedom Day
