= Juana de la Cruz =

Juana de la Cruz is the name of:

- Juana Inés de la Cruz, Mexican scholar
- Juana de la Cruz Vázquez Gutiérrez, Spanish abbess
- Juana dela Cruz, Philippine personification
