= George Mead =

George Mead or Meade may refer to:

- George Meade (merchant) (1741–1808), American merchant and grandfather of George Meade
- George Meade (1815–1872), United States Army officer and civil engineer
- George Herbert Mead (1863–1931), American philosopher, sociologist, and psychologist
- G. R. S. Mead (George Robert Stowe Mead, 1863–1933), British theosophist
- George L. Meade (1869–1925), New York politician
- George J. Mead (1891–1949), American aircraft engineer
- George Mead, alias used by Eliza Allen (1826–after 1851), American woman writer who disguised herself as a man to fight in the Mexican–American War
