= Lady Verney High School =

Location
- Kingshill Road; High Wycombe, Buckinghamshire, HP13 5BB; England; 51.648°N 0.73424°W

Information
- Type: Grammar school
- Established: 1956
- Closed: 1993
- Ofsted: Reports
- Gender: Girls
- Age: 12 to 18
- Enrolment: 330
- Colours: Grey and Green

Lady Verney High School was a girls' grammar school in High Wycombe, Buckinghamshire, England that closed in 1993.

== History ==
The origin of the school was in the girls' section of Wycombe Technical School in Easton Street, High Wycombe. It was established in November 1956 and opened in January 1957 with 260 pupils in the former premises of Wycombe High School in Benjamin Road, which dated from 1906. They were too small to cope with the expansion of that school which necessitated a move to new buildings on Marlow Hill to the south of the town centre. The new school was named Lady Verney after the educationalist Margaret Verney, a member of the local Verney family who served on the Education Committee of Buckinghamshire County Council.

In 1988 the school moved to the larger premises of the former Wellesbourne County Secondary School at Kingshill Road on the northern edge of the town. The number of pupils then fell and Buckinghamshire County Council were concerned that the numbers might decline further to 250 by the end of the 1990s, meaning that it would not be able to offer a wide range of subjects. An action group was formed to save the school and it was suggested that the decline in numbers was partly due to the move from the town centre and a boys' school accepting girls into its 6th form. The campaign was not successful and the school closed on 31 August 1993. The 333 pupils, 43 of them taking GCSEs, were transferred to Wycombe High School where there was an investment in new drama, sport and technology blocks and one of the new blocks was named the Verney Building. Whilst building work was completed the enlarged school was run on a split site for a year, with girls attending at both sites until the merger was complete. The Kingshill Road site was later sold for housing development, while a road on the former Benjamin Road site is now named Lady Verney Close.

== Academic performance ==
The year before its closure, Lady Verney High School was among 11 state schools in the country where 100% of pupils gained five or more grades A to C at GCSE. Their A level results however were just surpassed by those at Wycombe High School; in the final year, Wycombe High School pupils averaged 19.4 points on a scale which awards 10 points for each A-grade and two for each E-grade. The average A-level score at Lady Verney was 14.3 points for the same academic year.

== Uniform ==
The school uniform colours were grey and green. The school badge featured an image of a phoenix which was the crest of the Verney family.

== Notable alumni ==
- Elizabeth Bonner Allen (born 1964), documentary film maker
