= Juana de la Cruz Vázquez Gutiérrez =

Spanish abbess

Blessed Juana de la Cruz Vázquez y Gutiérrez TOR
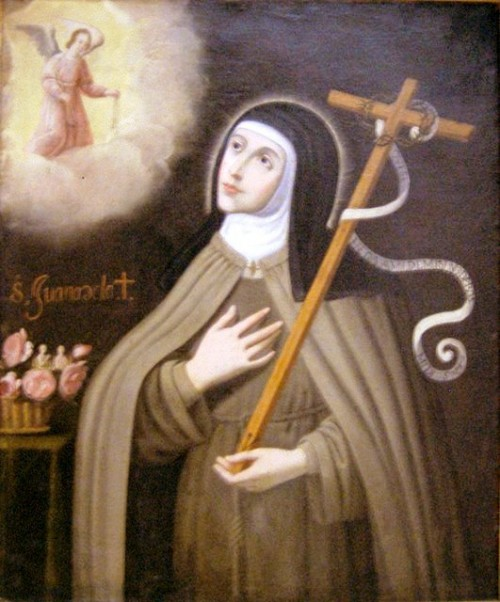
- Anonymous Spanish artist (16th–17th century)

Religious
- Born: 3 May 1481; Azaña, Toledo, Crown of Castile
- Died: 3 May 1534 (age 53); Cubas de la Sagra, Madrid, Spain
- Venerated in: Roman Catholic Church
- Beatified: 25 November 2024, Apostolic Palace, Vatican City by Pope Francis
- Feast: 3 May

Juana de la Cruz Vázquez y Gutiérrez, TOR, (3 May 1481 – 3 May 1534), was a Spanish abbess of the Franciscan Third Order Regular. Known to be a mystic, she was authorized to preach publicly, an extraordinary permission for a woman. Living at the start of Spanish mysticism's golden era, she is counted among Teresa of Ávila's literary mothers. In 2015, she was declared a venerable by the Catholic Church. Pope Francis beatified her on 25 November 2024.

== Early life ==
Born Juana Vázquez y Gutiérrez, she was the daughter of Juan Vázquez and Catalina Gutiérrez, who were prosperous farmers in the town of Azaña, now called Numancia de la Sagra, on 3 May 1481. In 1488, her mother died and Vázquez decided to join the Beaterio (convent) of Santa María de la Cruz de La Sagra, a community of Franciscan tertiaries founded in 1464, when she grew up, in order to fulfill a promise her mother had made while pregnant with her.

In 1496, Vázquez went to live with an aunt and uncle in Illescas. Her beauty and virtue were such that she caught the eye of a noble knight, Francisco de Laorte. Juana's father betrothed her to him. Pressured by her family to marry, she dressed like a man and ran away from home. She was received by the sisters at Beaterio de Santa María de la Cruz. Pursued by her family, she convinced her father to give her permission to stay in the convent. The following year, she made her religious profession, taking the name Juana de la Cruz. She lived as a Franciscan sister for 38 years, during which time she helped to spread the praying of the rosary and devotion to the Guardian Angels.

== Franciscan life ==
Vázquez lost the ability to speak for six months in 1506. Her biographers claim that it was a time of purification that developed her gift of preaching, which she began to do in 1508 with the permission of Church authorities. She grew in popularity due to her preaching, which was such that the Franciscan preacher Fray Francisco de Torres claimed that she

...taught, moved and delighted (the listener) more than any of the most eloquent orators; (she preached) in a humble and plain style as is the custom of the Holy Spirit."

In addition to Emperor Charles V, among those who would go to her sermons were such leading figures of Spanish society as Cardinal Cisneros, Gonzalo Fernández de Córdoba, the military hero of the Reconquest, and Don Juan of Austria.

In 1509, Vázquez obtained the raising of the status of the convent to that a monastery, of which she was then elected the first abbess. The next year, Cisneros granted her the favor of having the Church of San Andrés, a parish church adjacent to the monastery, made a benefice of the community. The priest who had been pastor was reduced to being a vicar. Although a common arrangement elsewhere in Europe, this was considered a scandal in Spain. Because several priests complained about this, Vázquez asked for and received approval for this arrangement from Pope Julius II.

As abbess, Vázquez mentored and spiritually directed many nobles, clerics, religious and lay people. She also expanded the life of the nuns of the monastery to be dedicated to the education of young women. She and her sisters extended the community with new foundations in Illescas, Fuensalida (1533) and San Martin de Valdeiglesias (1545).

When Cisneros died in 1517, Vázquez became the victim of the secular clergy, which tried to have the benefice removed from her authority. Because of this, she asked for and received papal confirmation of the benefice. Her troubles, however, continued when a certain nun, Sister Eufrasia, her community's sub-vicaress who desired to take over as abbess, defamed Vázquez to the other nuns. These false accusations reached the ears of the Franciscan Minister Provincial who deposed her as abbess. She obeyed and exhorted the sisters to accept his decision.

Sister Eufrasia did not last long as abbess. She fell gravely ill and admitted her sin of envy and of defaming Vázquez, who, in 1523, was renamed the abbess of the community. In 1524, an illness left her paralyzed, but she continued preaching. Slowly, she who had called herself “God’s trumpet” became “God’s guitar.”

Vázquez died on 3 May 1534 at the age of 53. Although she has not been canonized, popular piety refers to her as Santa Juana.

== Influence ==
Seventy-two of Vázquez' sermons were collected in 1509 in the manuscript called The Conhorte, which includes visions of heavenly life. Her sermons influenced Poor Clares including Jerónima de la Asunción (foundress of the first Catholic monastery in the Philippines), Luisa de la Ascensión de Carrión (mystical poet) and Maria de Jesús de Ágreda. The power of her sermons led Friar Francisco de Torres to become her great admirer and supporter. He would add gloss to her sermons.

== Process of canonization ==
Soon after her death, Vázquez was proclaimed a saint by the popular acclaim of the townspeople who called her '"la Santa Juana". Her remains were visited by kings, cardinals and the nobility.

In 1615-1617, the Archbishop of Toledo proclaimed Vázquez to be holy and allowed the development of a public cult in her honor, which spread quickly throughout Spain and Latin America. Any formal recognition by the Catholic Church of this acclamation, however, was blocked by a decree of Pope Urban VIII, which stated that for recognition of the sanctity, a person had to be dead for at least one hundred years. In 1619, the cause for her beatification was officially approved, and the process for her canonisation begun. On 4 May 1630, she was declared a venerable, and the tribunal reported favorably on her virtue and miracles. The process was halted, however, by the loss of the documents promoting her cause. It is argued, however, that one factor contributing to this was the discomfort felt by Church authorities with the intensely homoerotic imagery that she used to express her understanding of how the soul interacts with God and the role of the Virgin Mary in salvation.

The process for her beatification was restarted three times: in 1664-1679, 1702-1731 and 1980. On 18 March 2015, Pope Francis authorized the Congregation for the Causes of the Saints to release a decree declaring that she had exhibited heroic virtue during her life.

== Mystical experience ==
Vázquez's mystical life began at a very early age and was nurtured by traditional Christian practice. She had her first mystical experience at age four. She fell off a horse and was lying on the ground as if dead when the Virgin Mary and her Guardian Angel appeared to Juana and healed her. She gave herself to the popular devotion of the cross, the rosary, the Virgin Mary and guardian angels. She would developed a sacramental devotion to penance and the Eucharist.

During her adolescence, Vázquez practiced mortification of the flesh, fasting and prayer vigils.

At age fifteen, guided by her guardian angel, Vázquez dressed as a man and ran away from home to join a Franciscan convent, where she was welcomed by an image of the Virgin Mary that spoke to her as she waited to speak with the superior.

At age 25, Vázquez became mute for six months from the feast of St. Scholastica to the feast of St. Clare. During this time, she began to experience moments of ecstasy and rapture that led her to become a preacher. According to her biographer Sor María Evangelista, Sor Juana told her that “when the Lord made her mute, he first spoke to her in spirit and told her: ‘Keep my secret and do not speak, because I will speak instead’. With this, His Majesty made her understand that he himself, because of her humility, with love that he has of souls, wanted to speak to them and reveal secrets and great wonders (to them)…” (Vita y fin… c. VI, 1-3).

Her silent ecstasies lasted from 1506 to 1508, and she then began to have auditory ecstasies and visions. During an ecstasy in 1507, she experienced her betrothal to Jesus, with the Virgin Mary acting as the matron of honour (madrina) and giving her Son the ring for his bride. During another ecstasy in 1508, she received the stigmata that stayed with her from Good Friday to the Solemnity of the Ascension.

Her ecstasies and visions became the source of her preaching but also her working of miracles and cures with the sign of the cross. Besides preaching and miracles, she also spoke in tongues, specifically Basque and Arabic.

== Works about her ==
Sister María Evangelista, a companion of Vázquez, began to transcribe her sermons in 1509 at the command of Cardinal Cisneros. Also, she began to write an autobiography, Comienza la Vida y Fin de la bienaventurada virgen Sancta Juana de la Cruz. The 137-page manuscript of the 16th-century text is kept in the Real Biblioteca Escorial (Sign K-III-13). Maria Evangelista collected 72 of Sor Juana's sermons into a manuscript called El Libro del Conhorte (Mss.454) which can be translated as "The Exhortation" or "The Consolation". It too is kept in the Real Biblioteca Escorial (Sign J-II-18).

The Franciscan preacher and scholar Francisco de Torres added glosa (sidenotes) to El Conhorte from 1567-1568. His glosa are interesting in his apologetic defence of her authority and teaching. He uses her sermons as a polemical tool against the social abuses of his day and how he reveals the story of his own life in the glosa.

Innocente Gárcia Andrés Francisco's glosa highlight several things about Sor Juana.

- She was a simple, ignorant (idiota) woman who was "most wise", "educated by God" and "ingenious and most spiritual author" (17,6; 24,9; 12,3, etc.).
- She was an orthodox and most Catholic prophet. As a prophet, she proclaimed conformity to the Gospel and preached against heretical movements and persons. Francisco called her "a most wise sink hammer against heretics" (8.2).
- She was an efficient, simple and heartfelt preacher. Francisco especially saw her as a Franciscan preacher who conforms to the teachings of St. Francis and spiritual Franciscans (28,3).
- She was a "vernacular" theologian, "the simple and ignorant daughter of the simple and ignorant Francis"(14,14). Francisco especially valued her message of love as the experience and knowledge of God that implies love of neighbor.
- She was a teacher of life and doctrine. Francisco declared her to be his teacher and marvelled at how the Holy Spirit speaks to the reader through her (24,7).

The first official chronicler of the Franciscans in Spain, Fray Antonio Daça, wrote the earliest printed Life of Santa Juana de la Cruz in 1610. It was reprinted some 30 times in Madrid, Saragossa, Valladoilid, Treviri, Pavía, lérida, Paris, Florence, Modena, Leon, Naples, and Monaco. Its final reprint was in Venice in 1646. He is also known for having published Cuarta parte de las crónicas de la orden de San Francisco ("The Fourth Part of the Chronicles of the Order of St. Francis") and Historia de las llagas de San Francisco ("History of the Stigmata of St. Francis").

Other early works on the life of Vázquez include the following:

- Fray Juan Carillo, Vida y milagros de la Venerable virgen Sor Juana de la Cruz, Saragossa 1623, Mexico 1684.
- Fray Pedro Navarro, Favores del Rey del cielo, hechos a su esposa la santa Juana de la Cruz, Madrid 1622, 1699.
- Fray Juan g. de San Diego Villalón, Epitome de la vida de Sor Juana de la Cruz, Saragossa 1663.

Vázquez remained forgotten in the literary world from 1663 to 1986, when the journal Nueva Revista de Filogia Hispana (vol.33) published an article about her, "La M. Juana de la Cruz y la cuestión de la autoridad religiosa femenina" (483-490).

== Contemporary bibliography ==
Juana de la Cruz. El Conhorte: Sermones de una mujer. La Santa Juana (1481-1534). Edited by Inocente García de Andrés. 2 vols. Madrid: Fundación Universitaria Española, 1999.

Juana de la Cruz. Mother Juana de la Cruz, 1481–1534: Visionary Sermons. Translated by Ronald E. Surtz and Nora Weinerth. Edited by Jessica A. Boon and Ronald E. Surtz. Toronto, Tempe, AZ: Iter Academic Press, Arizona Center for Medieval and Renaissance Studies, 2016.

- Ronald E. Surtz (1990). The Guitar of God: Gender, Power, and Authority in the Visionary World of Mother Juana de La Cruz (1481-1534). University of Pennsylvania Press. ISBN 978-0-8122-8225-2.
- María Victoria Triviño, OSC., "La Santa Juana grande y legitima Maestra Franciscana", in Las Clarisas en España y Portugal. Congreso Internacional de Santa Clara, Salamanca 1993.
- Ángela Muñoz, "Sor Juana de la Cruz. Imágenes de divinidad para las mujeres" in Acciones e intenciones de mujeres, en la vida religiosa de los siglos XV y XVI, Madrid 1995, 179-191.
- Innocente G. de Andrés, El Conhorte. Sermones de una muijer. La Santa Juana (1481-1534) I y II, Madrid, F.U.E. 1999.
- María Isabel Barbeito, "Y contó maravillas", in Giornate di Studio, Cubas de la Sagra, Maggio 1999, 67-79.
- María Victoria Triviño, OSC.,"Fiestas del cielo, juegos y danzas en la predicación de Juana de la Cruz", in Giornate di Studio, Cubas de la Sagra, Maggio 1999, 89-109.
- María Victoria Triviño, OSC., "Santa María Sacerdote Grande. Sermón 5: De la Purificación de Nuestra Señora" in Giornate di Studio, Cubas de la Sagra, Maggio 1999, 39-69.
- María Victoria Triviño, OSC., Mujer, predicatora y párroco. La santa Juana (1481-1534), Madrid, BAC (Biografias) 1999,
- María Victoria Triviño, OSC., "El arte al servicio de la predicación, La Santa Juana (1481-1534) Franciscana de la TOR" in La clausura feminina en España: Atti del Simposio I, El Escorial, Instituto Escurialense de Investigaciones Históricas y 2004,
- Jesús Gomez Lopez. "Juana de la Cruz (1481-1534). La Santa Juana. Vida, obra, santidad y causa" in La clausura feminina en España: Atti del Simposio I, El Escorial, Instituto Escurialense de Investigaciones Históricas y 2004, 1223-1250.
- María del mar Graña Cid, "la feminidad de Jesucristo y sus implicaciones eclesiales en la predicación mistica de Juana de la Cruz (Sobre la Prereforma y la Querella de las Mujeres in Castilla)" in Estudios Eclesiásticos, 84 (2009) 477-513.
- Triviño, "Sor Juana de la Cruz. La Santa Juana (1481-1534)", in Misitici Francescani: Secolo XVI IV edited by Gianluigi Pasquale, Milano, Editrici Francescane 2010, 2223-2233.
- Jessica A. Boon, "Mother Juana de la Cruz: Marian Visions and Female Preaching", in

A New Companion to Hispanic Mysticism edited by Hilaire Kallendorf and Colin Thompson Boston, Brill 2010, 127-148.

- Claire Becker, "Transmisogyny in later (1588–1623) hagiography on Mother Juana de la Cruz (1481–1534)," in Gender & History 36(2024): pp. 72-90.

== See also ==
- Juana de la Cruz Vazquez
