= Liz Allen =

Irish investigative journalist (born 1969)

Liz Allen (born 1969) is an Irish investigative journalist. She is a former crime correspondent of the Sunday Independent and author of two novels.

== Early life and education ==
Born one of eight brothers and sisters in Cabra West, Dublin, she developed a taste for writing at 14 by becoming a regular contributor to the letters pages of The Evening Herald. By 16 she had obtained a weekend job with the paper writing local footballers sports profiles.

She studied law for a year at University College in Dublin before leaving to freelance for The Herald.

== Career ==
She and her publisher were prosecuted for offending against the Irish Official Secrets Act in 1995, after she used a police memo to write a story revealing that police had prior knowledge of Ireland's greatest bank robbery.

Working at first for the Irish Independent, followed by the Sunday Tribune; after the 1996 murder of colleague Veronica Guerin, Allen became crime correspondent at the Sunday Independent. One of her first stories for the paper was an interview with John Gilligan, suspected of the murder.

After resigning from her position at the newspaper in 2000, Allen sued The Independent, claiming constructive dismissal due to stress and anxiety. The Employment Tribunal found in Allen's favour, awarding her IR£70,500, the largest such award to that date. After appealing, the newspaper eventually settled out of court in October 2001.

In 2003, Hodder & Stoughton published her first novel, Last to Know, and in 2005 her second novel, The Setup.

In 2014, she founded the Glasthule Gallery in Dublin, which subsequently closed down in June 2018. Later that year she was declared bankrupt with €3.7m in debts.
