= Emilia Bicchieri =

Italian Roman Catholic professed religious

Blessed Emilia Bicchieri O.P.
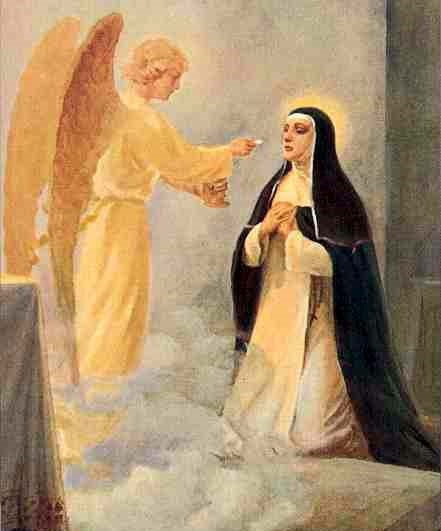

Religious
- Born: 3 May 1238; Vercelli, Duchy of Savoy
- Died: 3 May 1314 (aged 76); Vercelli, Duchy of Savoy
- Venerated in: Roman Catholic Church
- Beatified: 19 July 1769, Saint Peter's Basilica, Papal States by Pope Clement XIV
- Canonized: 19 January 1770
- Feast: 3 May; 4 May (Dominicans)
- Attributes: Dominican habit

Emilia Bicchieri, OP (3 May 1238 – 3 May 1314) was an Italian Catholic nun of the Dominican Order. Born to a patrician, she is best known for founding a convent in her hometown of Vercelli, where she served as prioress.

Bicchieri was beatified in 1769 by Pope Clement XIV.

== Life ==
Emilia Bicchieri was born in 1238 in Vercelli as the fourth of seven girls to Pietro Bicchieri, a patrician of noble stock. She was baptized sometime in the month of her birth. In her childhood, she often sang psalms in the house and retreated to her room for spiritual reflection. In her adolescence, she staved off her father's attempts for her to enter an advantageous marriage.

Before her birth, her mother had a vivid dream in which she saw the future work of her daughter. She told this to a Dominican friar who told her that she would bear a daughter and that the dream was a clear sign that the unborn child would become a saint.

In her childhood Bicchieri was taught to read and to embroider, and was considered her father's favourite despite emptying her purse as quickly as he could fill it – she provided alms to the poor with tender affection. Her three older sisters concerned themselves with advantageous marriages for greater wealth while she shunned such things as vain.

Bicchieri's ambitions in 1254 were to become a nun but she did not know which order she would enter. In 1256 she decided her call was to serve God as a professed nun in the Order of Preachers. Her father bowed to pressure and in 1255 decided to oversee the construction of an establishment that his daughter could found in her name and use for religious purposes. Her father died after the convent was constructed in 1255, which came as a tremendous blow to her for she was devoted to her father; she had dreaded informing him of her decision to become a nun.

The hopeful Bicchieri founded the convent of Santa Margherita in her hometown for regular Dominican tertiaries and in 1257 enrolled in the Dominicans before making her solemn profession and receiving the habit of the order; her convent would observe the rule of the Third Order of Saint Dominic. Pope Alexander IV issued a papal brief that authorized the new convent in 1256. The convent was incorporated into the full order sometime in 1266. On 28 September 1257, she and 30 others took the habit and her mother came to attend the celebration and was amazed that her dream seemed to be fulfilled.

She was elected as prioress in 1258 – against her will – but despite her position she liked to do the most menial of domestic duties in service to her fellow sisters. Bicchieri was reconfirmed as prioress in 1273. The prioress became noted for her frequent reception of the Eucharist and for often giving into ecstasies. During her tenure as prioress, the rule in force at the time prohibited members from drinking in between meals without the express permission of the prioress, which was something that was conceded on ultra-rare occasions. Cecilia Avogadro requested but did not obtain Bicchieri's consent, and was advised to take her cup to the angel in meditation for sustenance. This religious died sometime later all of a sudden and ended up in Purgatory. She appeared to the prioress and thanked her for her firmness. She was known to wear a hair shirt and often fasted as signs of penance.

Bicchieri died in 1314 and her remains were placed in a modest grave before being relocated to her convent in 1537. Her remains were moved one final time to Vercelli Cathedral in 1811.

== Beatification ==
The formal ratification of the local 'cultus' – or popular and enduring devotion to her – enabled Pope Clement XIV to grant formal approval to the beatification of the late religious on 19 July 1769. One year later, a small provincial printer in Vercelli issued a biography of the nun.
