= Elizabeth Bonner Allen =

British documentary film maker

Elizabeth Bonner Allen (born 14 March 1964), is a British documentary film maker. Examples of her work are the TV programs Waste, Parking Mad, 15 Stone Babies, Inside John Lewis, and Silverville.

Her work has appeared on the BBC, Channel Four, ITV, UKTV, ABC, ABC2, and elsewhere internationally.

== Life and career ==
Allen attended Lady Verney High School in High Wycombe, and she initially trained to be a nurse before embarking on a career as a film-maker. Her family emigrated to Australia while she was in film school, but she decided to stay in the UK. After a brief spell working for the London communication agency ‘Imagination’, she joined the BBC's specialist factual department. The first series she worked on was Child of Our Time.

Allen went freelance after developing a number of successful documentary projects including the Royal Television Society award nominated Sins of Our Father as well as the RTS winner Breast Cancer; the operation. She has successfully delivered a number of high-rating documentaries.

== Filmography ==
- Waste, BBC Bristol, Series Producer, three 60-minute episodes for BBC2. An observational documentary about the waste industry in Newcastle.
- Parking Mad, Century Films, Producer/Director, three 60-minute episodes for BBC1.
- The 15 Stone Baby, Minnow Films Producer/Director one 60-minute episode for Channel Four/More4 in 2012, concerning adult babies in the UK and the USA. Allen was responsible for research, casting, script writing, and shooting on location as well as directed crews. Total responsibility of edit including commissioning composure and narrator.
- Poms in Paradise, Century Films Series Producer/Director ten 30-minute episodes for ITV in April 2012. A series of films which followed the fortunes of British immigrants to Sydney. Allen's responsibilities were casting, storytelling, shooting and taking series into edit. She also managed post production to delivery.
- Short Work, BBC2 Producer/Director one 60-minute short in 2011, about actors in the entertainment business. Allen's total responsibilities were researching/ casting, shooting in both UK and US, and for all the post-production.
- Meet the Multiples, BBC3/BBC1 Producer/Director one 60-minute documentary in 2011. An observational documentary about parenting Multiples. After being aired three times on BBC television, this show was watched by 3 million people.
- Junior Doctors: Your Life in Their Hands, BBC3 Story Producer & Edit Producer. (6 X 60 mins 2011). Series following a group of newly qualified doctors in Newcastle. Won ‘Best Factual Programme' at the Broadcast Digital Awards in 2011.
- Inside John Lewis, BBC2 2009 Producer/Director (3 x 60 mins broadcast BBC 2 March 2010). Observational documentary about the department store ‘John Lewis’ as it adapted to recession in the UK.
- Silverville, BBC 1 2008 Producer/Director (3 x 30 minute broadcast July/Aug 09). Observational series exploring old age in a retirement village.
- Meet the Immigrants, BBC1 2007 Producer/Director (3 x 30 min). Observational series about immigrants seeking new lives in Britain. Shooting on DSR around the UK, Calais and Latvia. Self-shooting on location and responsible for post production and delivery.
- Don't Die Young, BBC2 Birmingham 2007 Producer/Director (2 x 30mins). Health series with Dr. Alice Roberts. Self shooting and directing crews. Responsible for writing and taking two films into the edit.
- Skint, BBC1 2006 Producer/Director (2 x 30 mins). Observational documentary series following people who live in the poverty trap. Self shooting and responsible for post production and delivery of films.
- Trauma and Trauma South Africa, BBC1 & 3 2005, Producer/Director (3 x 30 mins). Filmed on location in London and Africa.
- Breast Cancer - The Operation, BBC 3 2004, Associate Producer. Won RTS award in 2005 for best educational documentary. Responsible for casting and filming of ‘Jane’s’ story. Overseeing edit and delivery.
- Get a New Life Italy, BBC2 broadcast 2003, Producer/Director. 60 minute programme about the lives of expats livings in Italy which was filmed on location in Umbria.
- My Son the Killer (a.k.a. Sins of the Father), BBC1 60 min documentary. Assistant producer 2003. RTS nominated.
- Autism Puzzle, BBC4, 2003 Assistant Producer. 60 min documentary exploring the science of autism.
- Desirability, BBC3 2003 Assistant Producer. Observational documentary series exploring how disabled people express their sexuality
- Animal Hospital, Assistant Producer BBC1 2003. Popular factual series.
- Butterflies, Producer/Director 2002. Corporate video for Voluntary Services Overseas filmed in India about a charity helping orphaned children in Delhi 2002.
- Child of Our Time, BBC1 2000–2002 Researcher. Observational series following the lives of children born in the year 2000, exploring the nurture/nature debate.
