= British Antique Dealers' Association =

British trade association for art and antique dealers

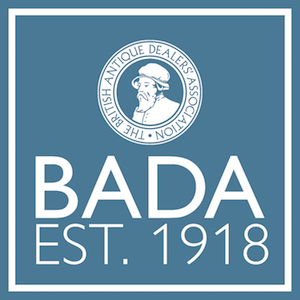
British Antique Dealers' Association Logo 2020

The British Antique Dealers' Association (BADA) was founded in London, 1918. It is Britain's leading trade association for art and antique dealers and its members are carefully vetted and selected for their experience and professional integrity, as well as the quality and craftsmanship of their stock. Many BADA members are internationally recognised for their expertise in their chosen field of speciality. Customers can bring complaints against individual members to the governing body who have the power to revoke membership from an offending business and ban them from participating at various art fairs around the world.

The current President of the Association is Lord Carrington of Fulham, and the Chairman is Louise Phillips of Elaine Phillips Antiques in North Yorkshire.

== Ivory controversy ==
The British Antique Dealers' Association has strongly opposed moves for a total ban on the sale and trading of ivory. In 2016 the then President of the group, Victoria Borwick, then also serving as an MP, told the House of Commons that "any ban on antique ivory is cultural vandalism". Other MPs criticised Borwick's comments with Rachael Maskell, the Labour MP describing them as "objectionable".

== Art Fairs ==
Until 2019, BADA organised their own yearly art fair in Duke of York Square. The company set up to manage the Fair, Bada Ltd, was sold in 2019 with BADA retaining a 20% stake, and the Fair was relaunched as The Open Art Fair. BADA remained the official vetting partner.
