= Elizabeth Haigh =

Singaporean-born British chef (born 1988)

- Born: Elizabeth Allen; May 1988 (age 37–38); Singapore
- Education: Central St Martins; Westminster Kingsway College
- Culinary career
- Rating: Michelin stars
- Current restaurant: Mei Mei (kopitiam in Borough Market)
- Previous restaurants: Pidgin; Smokehouse; Kitchen Table; Royal Oak
- Television shows: MasterChef; Saturday Kitchen

Elizabeth "Liz" Haigh (née Allen, born May 1988) is a Singaporean-born British chef who competed on MasterChef in 2011, and went on to win a Michelin star at the Hackney-based restaurant Pidgin. Haigh currently operates the kopitiam Mei Mei at Borough Market.

== Career ==
Born to a Singaporean mother and an English father in Singapore, and raised in Maidenhead, she trained as an architect at Central Saint Martins in London. While there, she realised that she preferred to cook, and appeared on the BBC television series MasterChef on a dare.

The 2011 series was her first experience of cooking outside of her home or for her friends. She was eliminated early on in the series.

Haigh decided to pursue a career in cooking, and started to work at a gastropub called The Green Oak in Windsor She then moved to the Royal Oak, Paley Street, where she came under the influence of head chef Dominic Chapman. While she was working there, she attended culinary classes at Westminster Kingsway College. Haigh also worked at Neil Rankin's Smokehouse restaurant.

In 2015, she co-founded Pidgin with James Ramsden and Sam Herlihy, following on from their supper club, the Secret Larder. Shortly after Pidgin was awarded a star in the 2017 Michelin Guide, she left. She set up a company called Kaizen House, under which she originally planned to launch her own restaurant Shibui in 2018. The restaurant was planned to feature wood fired cooking with elements from different cuisines. Having delayed opening the restaurant due to concerns about the economic climate, she opened Mei Mei, a kopitiam in London's Borough Market at the end of 2019.

== Plagiarism allegations ==
Haigh published her recipe book Makan in May 2021. The book was withdrawn by the publisher Bloomsbury "due to rights issues" in October 2021 after Haigh was accused of plagiarizing recipes and anecdotes from Singaporean author Sharon Wee's 2012 Nonya cuisine recipe book Growing up in a Nonya Kitchen. Wee stated that she had not been contacted for permission before portions of her book appeared in Makan. According to The Straits Times, Haigh was also accused of to have plagiarizing from other sources, including the food blog Rasa Malaysia and a Singaporean cookbook published in 1981. Singaporean company Anthony The Spice Maker also found directions on how to use two of the spice blends listed in Mei Mei's online catalog being 80% similar to their own while conducting a market research. Recipes are generally not protected by US or UK copyright laws, as lists of ingredients and basic instructions to reproduce the dishes are considered factual. However, directions and other content may have copyright protection as they are considered "substantial literary expression."
