= Elizabeth Bray Allen =

Plantation owner and school founder in Virginia (c. 1692 – 1774)

Elizabeth Bray Allen also known as Elizabeth Bray Allen Smith Stith (ca. 1692–by 22 February 1774) operated a large plantation after the death of her first husband, Arthur Allen. After the death of her second husband, she operated both the Allen and Smith estates. She provided the direction and funds to establish a free school for poor boys and girls in Smithfield, Virginia.

She was made a Virginia Women in History honoree in 2015 by the Library of Virginia.

== Early life ==
Elizabeth Bray, born about 1692, was the daughter of Mourning Burgh Pettus and James Bray, who were married about 1691. James Bray was from Wilmington Parish, James City County. He bought 1280 acres on the north side of the James River in James City County, which was known as "Utopia" and "Littletown". He had a brick house in Colonial Williamsburg in 1711. He also owned other property in James City County, York County, and New Kent County, Virginia. In 1688 and 1702, he was a member of the House of Burgesses. Her mother, Mourning Pettus, was the widow of Thomas Pettus of Littletown in York County.

She grew up near Colonial Williamsburg and learned to read and write, which was unusual for girls at the time, whose education was generally limited to household skills and social graces. She had at least one sister, Angelica, and two brothers, one named Thomas. (Note: There was no mention of another son in his will, but a grandson, James Bray III, who was the son of Thomas was mentioned.) Her mother died January 6, 1711, and her father died November 25, 1725.

== Marriages ==
Elizabeth Bray married Arthur Allen on November 27, 1711, at her family's house in Williamsburg. Arthur owned a large plantation, with 23 enslaved workers on his two properties. His brick house in Surry County was known at Bacon's Castle in the early 19th century.

They had three children, a daughter Katharine, who married Benjamin Cocke, son James, and another daughter who married James Bradby. In 1727, Arthur died intestate, with an estate of about £900. (Note: Arthur Allen is also said to have died in 1725.) Two years earlier, her father died. She then inherited town lots in Williamsburg and land in James City County. She sold the land, which added to her wealth.

She and Arthur Smith entered into a marriage contract on February 17, 1729. Arthur Smith was an entrepreneur in Smithfield and a successful planter at the Isle of Wight County, Virginia. The intention was to protect the property she owned and inherited for herself and her children. (Note: Each of her children were to be paid £300 and Allen was paid £500 for her dower claim to Allen's estate by Arthur Smith, if the court decided it belonged in Allen's estate. Gundersen states that £300 was paid to Allen.)

The Smiths had a son. In 1743 their son died in a swimming accident. Her son, Arthur Allen, died in 1744, without having any children. Arthur Smith died in 1754.

Between September 1761 and April 1763 she married a man with the surname Stith, his first name is unknown. There is no evidence of a marriage contract and Stith was no mentioned in her will in 1769, so he may have died before then.

== Estate management ==
Allen managed the Allen estate, including the house later called Bacon's Castle, after her husband's death. William Byrd II visited her house on February 28, 1728, as he headed toward the border of Virginia and North Carolina, which he was going to survey. He noted that she ran a well-ordered household and provided elegant entertainment. Byrd stated that she was a lady "who had copied Solomon's complete housewife exactly". (Note: This is a reference to King Solomon's Proverbs 31 § verses defining the good wife. Verse 20 defines the ideal wife as "an industrious housewife, a shrewd businesswoman, an enterprising trader, a generous benefactor")

After Arthur Smith died in 1754, she ran the Allen and Smith estates.

== Smithfield free school ==
Mason's Hall, Mason Street, Smithfield, VA - formerly the Smithfield school for poor boys and girls

In 1753, Allen established a £140 trust fund for school in Smithfield, with instructions for the building and the right to name the school's trustees. The school taught poor girls and boys to read and write. Boys were also taught arithmetic. After three years of education, boys became apprentices to learn a trade or skill. Girls were similarly bound to a woman to learn how to run a household. The school operated until the American Revolutionary War, when there were no teachers available to teach the children. After the war, the school trustees allowed the masons to have the building. The building was initially a one-story building and a second story was added at some point.

== Death ==
Elizabeth Bray Allen likely died by February 22, 1774 at her house in Surry County. She wrote her will before 1769 and it was proved on February 22, 1774. She left money for the education of her grandchildren and godchildren. Personal property was left to her granddaughters. Smithfield School received £120 and the residue of her estate. When she died, she had five enslaved workers.
