= Elizabeth Almira Allen =

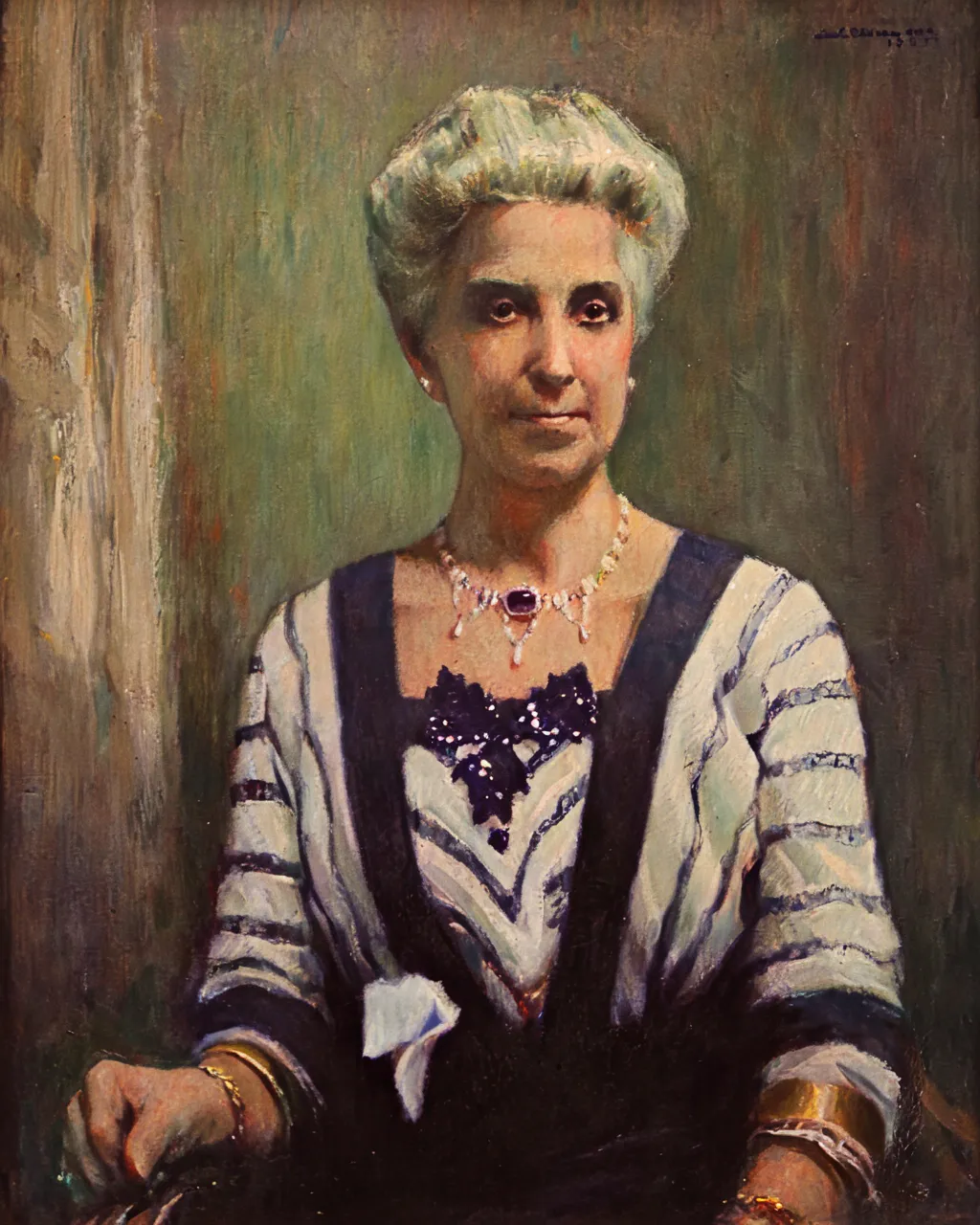
- Born: February 27, 1854; Joliet, Illinois, U.S.
- Died: May 3, 1919 (aged 65)
- Occupation: Educator
- Years active: 1871 - 1919

Elizabeth Almira Allen (February 27, 1854 — May 3, 1919) was an American teacher, teachers' rights advocate, and the first woman president of the New Jersey Education Association. Allen was born in Joliet, Illinois, daughter of James and Sarah J (Smith) Allen on February 27, 1854, and the eldest of five children. By 1867, the family had moved to New Jersey.

Allen advocated for teachers' pensions. In 1896, the first statewide teacher retirement law in the U.S. was passed in the New Jersey State Legislature.

In 1896, Senator John B. Vreeland of Mooristown introduced the " School Teachers Retirement Fund Bill," which provided half-pay annuity to teachers who were no longer able to teach, who had over 20 years of teaching experience. The bill was financed by a one percent stoppage from the monthly salary of all those elected to be considered by this law. This bill passed and became the first statewide retirement law for teachers.
