= Eliza Crosby Allen =

American editor of the Mothers' Journal (1803–1848)

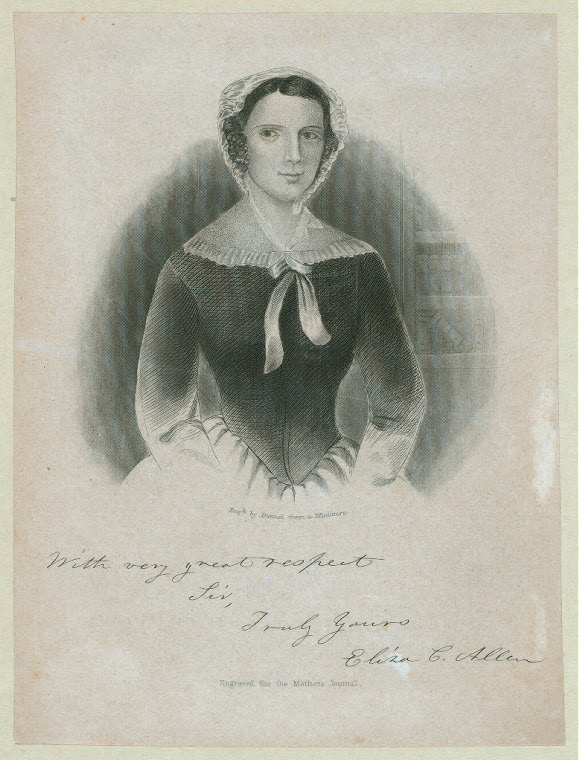
- Born: Eliza Crosby; August 20, 1803; Winchendon, Massachusetts, U.S.
- Died: October 15, 1848 (aged 45)
- Occupation: journal editor
- Spouse: Ira M. Allen (m. 1827)
- Writing career
- Notable works: Editor, Mothers' Journal (1840-48)

Eliza Crosby Allen (1803–1848) was a 19th-century American journal editor. For more than eight years, she served as the editor of the Mothers' Journal.

== Early life ==
Eliza Crosby was born in Winchendon, Massachusetts, on August 20, 1803. When she was three or four, she moved to Montpelier, Vermont, with her parents. Her father died at Montpelier when she was about 18 years of age. Two of Allen's mother's brothers, the Hon. Joseph Locke and John Locke, Esq., were residents of Lowell, Massachusetts.

Her parents were Christians, and her mother taught the six children religiously. At 14, Allen united with the Congregational Church in Montpelier. Six years later, her views changed. There being no Baptist Church at her home, she retained her membership with the Congregationalists until her removal to West Boylston, Massachusetts, when she became one of the Baptist Church.

== Career ==
On November 21, 1827, she married Rev. Ira M. Allen, then of Brandon, Vermont, but who became, in 1830, the agent of the Baptist General Tract Society and removed in the discharge of his official duties to Philadelphia. Here, she united with the Sansom Street Church, then under the pastoral charge of the Rev. John L. Dagg.

Her labors in this new sphere were complex and demanding. They included connections with various women's societies, the conduct of a young women's Bible class, and the preparation and editing of tracts. She also relieved her husband by taking charge of the depository and correspondence during his frequent absences. At the same time, she took care of her home and received her husband's guests and friends. In addition to all of these responsibilities, she found time to become a contributor to several religious periodicals.

The Mother's Journal was first published in Utica, New York, by Bennet and Bright. It was a monthly publication of 16 pages designed to instill valuable social and moral lessons for parents and children. Allen was the third editor, taking over in 1840. Having fewer personal responsibilities than the previous editors, Allen was able to give more time to preparing articles for its pages and in correspondence with friends to interest them on its behalf. At the same time, her husband became employed by the American and Foreign Bible Society, and they moved to New York City. When Allen conducted the journal, her husband assumed its proprietorship, enlarging it to 32 pages and publishing it in New York City.

Allen never enjoyed perfect health. Before her marriage, sickness brought her close to death. After that event, at Brandon, and for a time in Philadelphia also, she was the subject of a spinal affection which caused great suffering and disabled her from walking. Relieved from this, her constitution continued to be feeble. Still, she remained active in the order of her household, her interest in various societies, and her literary employment.

== Later life and death ==
Her husband, then employed by the American and Foreign Bible Society, was required to leave home on a tour to collect funds for three months during the winter of 1847–1848. The responsibility of procuring the paper for the Journal, making contracts with its printer, conducting the correspondence, and supplying the editorial matter was severe. It required inevitable exposure to severe weather, which broke down her strength. When influenza seemed to leave the developing symptoms of tuberculosis behind, she hoped to recover from a similar affection as she had in former years.

Kindly invited by the Rev. John Teasdale in June 1848 to try the therapeutic effects of a residence at his house at Schooley's Mountain, New Jersey, she found the air and the weather cold and stormy. Returning home with pulmonary disease, she instructed her husband on how to dispose of her books and effects after her death and interment. Though her brother invited Allen to winter in Florida, she died on October 15, 1848.

Allen's mother survived her at an advanced age, residing in Louisville, Kentucky.
