= Eliza Allen Starr =

American artist, art critic and teacher (1824–1901)

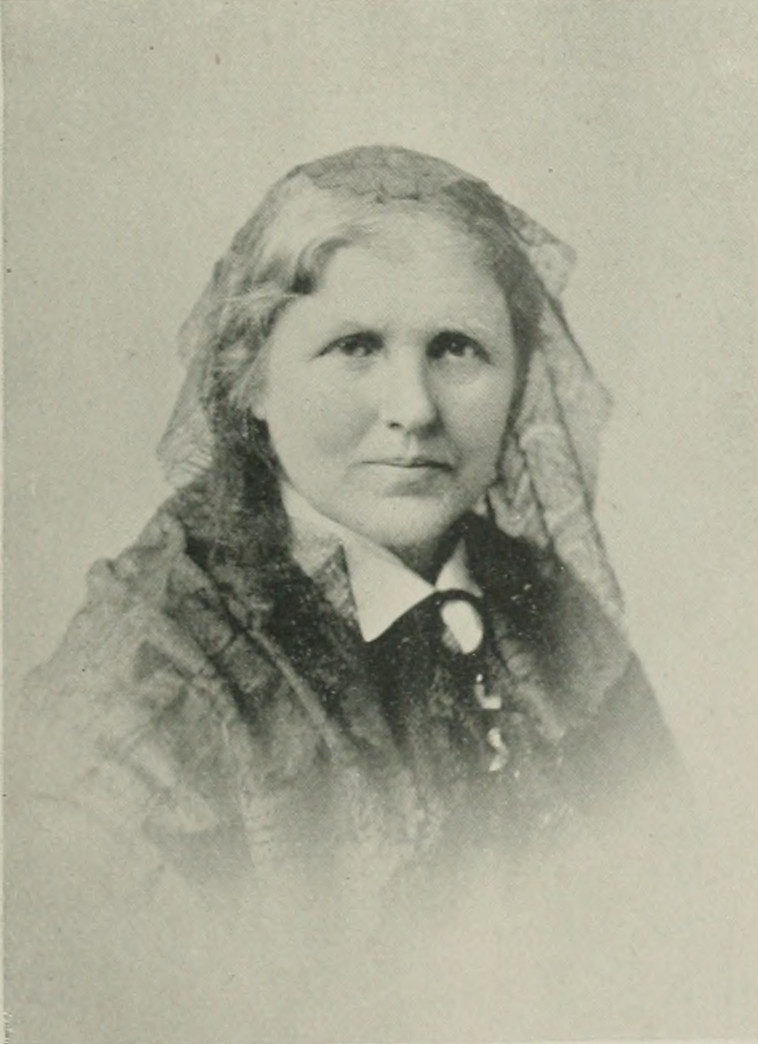
- Born: August 29, 1824; Deerfield, Massachusetts, U.S.
- Died: September 8, 1901 (aged 77); Durand, Illinois, U.S.
- Occupations: Artist, educator, and lecturer
- Parent(s): Oliver Starr and Lovina Allen

Eliza Allen Starr (August 29, 1824 – September 8, 1901) was an American artist, art critic, teacher, and lecturer. She was known throughout the United States and Europe for her books about Catholic art.

== Early life ==
Born in Deerfield, Massachusetts, on August 29, 1824, she was descended from Dr. Comfort Starr, of Ashford, County Kent, England, who, in 1634, settled in Cambridge, Massachusetts. On her mother's side she was descended from the "Allens of the Bars," originally of Chelmsford, England, who were prominent in Colonial history.

She was educated at home, and in early adulthood she enjoyed the social life of Boston and Philadelphia. In the latter city she formed many acquaintances of note, among them Archbishop Kenrick, through whose influence she was led into the Roman Catholic Church. She was received into the Church in 1854 at the old Holy Cross Cathedral in Boston.

== Career ==
While in Philadelphia, she published some of her earlier poems. Her family moved later to Chicago, Illinois, where she entered upon her literary career.

In 1867 she published a volume of poetry, and soon after she brought out Patron Saints. In 1875 she went to Europe, where she remained for some time, and on her return she published her art work, Pilgrims and Shrines, which, with her Patron Saints, has been widely read. In 1887 she published a collection of her poems, Songs of a Lifetime, and in 1890, A Long-Delayed Tribute to Isabella of Castile, as Co-Discoverer of America. That has been followed by Christmastide, Christian Art in Our Own Age, and What We See, the last intended especially for children.

A convert from Unitarianism to Catholicism, in 1885 she became the first woman to be awarded the Laetare Medal, the most prestigious honour given to American Catholics. Pope Leo XIII sent her a medallion after she wrote The Three Archangels and the Guardian Angels in Art. Starr was also awarded a medal for her work as an art educator, based on displays of her students' work at the World's Columbian Exposition. She was a founding member of the Queen Isabella Association.

At the end of the 19th century, she gave a series of remarkable lectures on art in her studio and in the homes of friends, which were repeated in the principal art and literary centers both east and west.

In 1885, she was awarded the Laetare Medal by the university of Notre Dame, the oldest and most prestigious award for American Catholics.

== Personal life ==
Starr moved to Chicago in 1856, where she taught art and began to lecture throughout the city and around the United States.

She was the aunt of and a large influence on Ellen Gates Starr.

== Selected works ==
- Songs of a Lifetime
- Patron Saints
- Pilgrims and Shrines
- Isabella of Castile
- What we see
- Ode to Christopher Columbus
- Christmas-tide
- Christian art in our own age
- The Seven Dolours of the Virgin Mary
- Literature of Christian Art
- The Three Keys to the Camera della Segnatura in the Vatican
- Art in the Chicago Churches
- Woman's Work in Art
- The Three Archangels and the Guardian Angels in Art
