= Elizabeth Allen (artist) =

Naive artist from England

- Born: 1883; Tottenham
- Died: 1967 (aged 83–84); Biggin Hill

Elizabeth Allen (1883, Tottenham–1967) was a naïve artist working primarily with patchwork and appliqué.

== Life and work ==
Allen was born in Tottenham, London. She was one of 17 children of a German father and Irish mother who were both tailors. She learned sewing in her parents’ workshop. It is also where she found her materials and inspiration, saying later in life that: “A picture dawns as soon as I see a lovely piece of cloth.” She went by the nickname Queen.

She lived in poverty her entire life. In 1932, she lost her home in Suffolk and later lived as a recluse in a shack near Biggin Hill. This is where she encountered an art student who shared her work with their teachers and gallerists. An exhibition at Crane Kalman Gallery in 1966 projected her into fame.

She is known for her patchwork compositions using textile offcuts, with themes ranging from religion to folk culture and the news. She is also known for depicting her life in a work titled Autobiraggraphy.

Her work sunk back into obscurity after her death in 1967, until she was exhibited in England again in 2026.
