= Eliza Allen (Maine) =

American writer

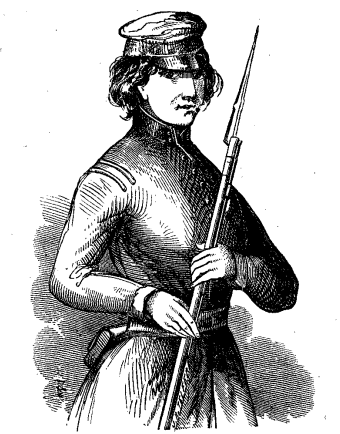
- Occupation: memoirist

Eliza Allen (January 27, 1826 – after 1851) was an American writer from Maine who, in 1851, published a memoir called The Female Volunteer; Or the Life and Wonderful Adventures of Miss Eliza Allen, A Young Lady of Eastport, Maine. In the book, she describes how as a teenager, she was not allowed to marry the man whom she loved, and so she disguised herself as a man and had many adventures, including fighting and being wounded in the Mexican–American War, though some sources question the veracity of her claims. She was also known as Eliza Billings (the surname of her husband).

== Early life ==
Eliza Allen was born January 27, 1826, to one of the most prominent families in Maine and enjoyed a comfortable early life on the family's estate. Eliza was well-educated and enjoyed reading. A Canadian family named Billings moved into the area and the family's father and his oldest son, William, worked as day laborers to support their large family. William Billings often worked for Eliza's father. Eliza and William met secretly, and fell in love at the age of 20. Eliza promised to marry William, though she knew her parents would not approve. When they found out, her parents threatened to disinherit her and throw her out of their home.

William decided the Mexican—American War afforded him an opportunity to better himself in the eyes of his fiancé's parents and volunteered for the U.S. Army. Eliza, who says in her autobiography that she had read about Deborah Sampson in the American Revolution and Lucy Brewer in the War of 1812, determined that she would follow him. She cut her hair, dressed in men's clothing, and sailed to Portland, Maine and volunteered herself under the alias George Mead the next day.

== Military service as described in The Female Volunteer ==
Eliza describes her experiences, including two tours in the Mexican—American War and a period, still presenting herself as George Mead, in the California gold rush, in her memoir The Female Volunteer; or the Life, Wonderful Adventures and Miraculous Escapes of Miss Eliza Allen, A Young Lady of Eastport, Maine. But several reputable sources, including a rare-book seller marketing a first edition question whether the book is historical or fiction. Others questioning the veracity of Eliza's purported exploits include Robert Walter Johannsen, in To the Halls of the Montezumas: The Mexican War in the American Imagination and Jeanne T. Heidler, in Daily Lives of Civilians in Wartime Early America: From the Colonial Era to the Civil War.

In her emotional preface, Eliza warns parents against arranging marriages against their children's wishes or forbidding love marriages and claims she undertook her adventures in the name of love.

For her first tour of duty, Allen, disguised as George Mead, reportedly fought under General Zachary Taylor in Texas. Allen was part of the American victory at Monterrey in September 1846. When that tour ended and Allen was not reunited with her fiancé, she signed up for a second tour, this time joining Gen. Winfield Scott's Siege of Veracruz in March 1847. She suffered a severe sword slash to her shoulder at the Battle of Cerro Gordo and wound up in a makeshift hospital at the hacienda of Don Alphonzo in Mexico City—next to William, who had also been wounded at Cerro Gordo. Here, she does not reveal herself to William for fear of being discovered, but she does intrigue to test his love for her.

According to Allen, Don Alphonzo's daughters had fallen for "George Mead"—and their father, unlike her own, had agreed to allow them to determine whether Mead might be an appropriate son-in-law. But Eliza, instead, tries to turn them toward William Billings. But William stands up to the test, vowing he cannot think of another but his true love back home.

As William and "George" recover, the war also ends, and they march with their compatriots to the seaboard where they leave New Orleans and then to New York. Eliza does not give up her male identity yet, though. She continues to hang around with William and his buddies, who ultimately gamble away their military pay at the hands of two men Eliza recognizes as slick swindlers while her friends do not. Having lost all their military pay, William and his friends decide to try their luck in the California gold rush—and again, Eliza follows. "George Mead" and his shipmates are a day behind William Billings, fortuitously, since Billings ship wrecks in the Straits of Magellan and he is among a handful of survivors picked up by the ship Eliza is travelling on. "Mead" helps to nurse Billings back to health.

They arrive in San Francisco, where "Mead"—who still has his military pay—sets up the group with tools for prospecting. During this period, "Mead" and Billings rest side-by-side on a pallet, where "Mead" hears Billings tell of his love for Eliza. They and their mates regain some funds prospecting and wind up sailing from San Francisco back to Boston in September 1849.

Allen rejoined her company at the Battle for Mexico City. Allen then took part in the occupation of Mexico City until 1848. She traveled with her unit to New York and was discharged.

== After the war ==
In Boston, in an apparently disreputable boarding house, Billings and the men they've traveled with are on the verge of losing all their money gambling again when Eliza determines to save him, this time by revealing herself to him. She parts company with them and checks herself into the Revere House, a good establishment, as Eliza Billings—sister to William Billings (so that he can visit her there without scandal). Then she reveals herself to William, persuades him not to gamble, and, eventually, they marry - with her parents' consent.

Allen published her autobiography in 1851. It resembles other memoirs of the time about women who disguised as men.
