= List of cathedrals in the United Kingdom =

This is a list of cathedrals in the United Kingdom.

NK = Not known

Name	Full Name	Location	Denomination	Province	Began	Completed	Established (Dissolved)	Length (m)			Height (m)			Organ			Notes
Name	Full Name	Location	Denomination	Province	Began	Completed	Established (Dissolved)	Overall	Nave	Chancel	Nave	Western Tower	Crossing Tower	Stops	Manuals	Builder	Notes
Birmingham Cathedral	Cathedral Church of St Philip	52°28′52″N 1°53′56″W	Anglican	Canterbury	1711	1715	1905	46				NK	N/A	66	4	Nicholson	There is 1 Western tower, surmounted by a dome.
Bristol Cathedral	Cathedral Church of the Holy and Undivided Trinity	51°27′06″N 2°36′03″W	Anglican	Canterbury	1220	1877	1542	91	38	NK	16	NK	NK	68	4	Walker	Status as cathedral removed between 1836 and 1896
Bury St Edmunds Cathedral	Cathedral Church of St James	52°14′38″N 0°43′01″E	Anglican	Canterbury	1503	1503	1914	NK	NK	NK	NK	N/A	NK	59	4	Harrison & Harrison	
Canterbury Cathedral	Cathedral and Metropolitical Church of Christ	51°16′47″N 1°04′59″E	Anglican	Canterbury	1070	1077	597	160	54	55	24	NK	72	60	3	Willis, Mander	Mother church of the Province of Canterbury and of the Anglican Communion worldwide
Chelmsford Cathedral	Cathedral Church of St Mary, St Peter and St Cedd	51°44′07″N 0°28′20″E	Anglican	Canterbury	1200	1520	1914	NK	NK	NK	NK	NK	N/A	52	4	Hill, Norman & Beard	Single West tower with spire
Chichester Cathedral	Cathedral Church of the Holy Trinity	50°50′11″N 0°46′50″W	Anglican	Canterbury	NK	1108	1080	124	NK	NK	19	NK	84	55	4	Mander	Crossing tower has a spire. There is also a separate bell tower.
Coventry Cathedral	Cathedral Church of St Michael	52°24′31″N 1°30′25″W	Anglican	Canterbury	1956	1962	1918	NK	NK	NK	NK	N/A	24	74	4	Harrison & Harrison	Is a non standard layout. The ruins of the previous cathedral are considered part of the cathedral, but are not included here to allow direct comparison.
Derby Cathedral	Cathedral Church of All Saints	52°55′29″N 1°28′39″W	Anglican	Canterbury	1530	1725	1927	NK	NK	NK	NK	65	N/A	98	4	Compton	NK
Ely Cathedral	Cathedral Church of the Holy and Undivided Trinity	52°23′55″N 0°15′48″E	Anglican	Canterbury	1083	1375	1109	163.7	NK	NK	21.9	66	52	80	4	Harrison & Harrison	Single West tower. Crossing tower is a lantern.
Exeter Cathedral	Cathedral Church of St Peter	50°43′21″N 3°31′47″W	Anglican	Canterbury	1112	1400	1050	117	NK	NK	NK	N/A	NK	69	4	Harrison & Harrison	Crossing tower replaced by 2 towers at the ends of the transepts.
Gloucester Cathedral	Cathedral Church of the Holy and Indivisible Trinity	51°52′03″N 2°14′48″W	Anglican	Canterbury	1089	1499	1541	130	53	42	21	N/A	68.6	60	4	Hill. Norman & Beard	
Guildford Cathedral	Cathedral Church of the Holy Spirit	51°14′28″N 0°35′24″W	Anglican	Canterbury	1936	1961	1965	NK	NK	NK	NK	N/A	48.8	77	4	Rushworth and Dreaper	
Hereford Cathedral	Cathedral Church of St Mary the Virgin and St Ethelbert	52°03′15″N 2°42′58″W	Anglican	Canterbury	1079	1250	676	104.2	48.2	22.9	19.5	N/A	50.3	67	4	Willis	
Leicester Cathedral	Cathedral Church of St Martin	52°38′05″N 1°08′13″W	Anglican	Canterbury	1086	1086	1927	NK	NK	NK	NK	N/A	67.1	50	4	Harrison & Harrison	Crossing tower is a spire.
Lichfield Cathedral	Cathedral Church of the Blessed Virgin Mary and St Chad	52°41′08″N 1°49′49″W	Anglican	Canterbury	1195	1340	1048	113	NK	NK	NK	60.5	76.8	82	4	Norman & Beard	Previously a cathedral 669–803. All 3 towers are spires.
Lincoln Cathedral	Cathedral Church of St Mary	53°14′04″N 0°32′11″W	Anglican	Canterbury	1185	1311	1070	147	NK	NK	24	NK	83	64	4	Willis	
St Paul's Cathedral, London	Cathedral Church of St Paul	51°30′50″N 0°05′54″W	Anglican	Canterbury	NK	1675	1300	158	NK	NK	NK	67	111	109	5	Willis	Commonly known as St Paul's Cathedral. The crossing tower is a dome.
Norwich Cathedral	Cathedral Church of Holy and Undivided Trinity	52°37′54″N 1°18′02″E	Anglican	Canterbury	1096	1125	1094	140	NK	NK	NK	N/A	96	105	4	Hill, Norman & Beard	Central tower is a spire
Christ Church Cathedral, Oxford	The Cathedral Church of Christ, Oxford	51°45′03″N 1°15′16″W	Anglican	Canterbury	1160	1200	1542	NK	NK	NK	NK	N/A	NK	43	4	Rieger	
Peterborough Cathedral	Cathedral Church of St Peter, St Paul and St Andrew	52°34′20″N 0°14′18″W	Anglican	Canterbury	1118	1237	1541	147	NK	NK	NK	NK	44	86	4	Harrison & Harrison	Several West towers
Portsmouth Cathedral	Cathedral Church of St Thomas of Canterbury	50°47′26″N 1°06′15″W	Anglican	Canterbury	NK	NK	1927	NK	NK	NK	NK	NK	37	60	3	Nicholson	
Rochester Cathedral	Cathedral Church of the Blessed Virgin Mary	51°23′20″N 0°30′12″E	Anglican	Canterbury	1079	1238	604	NK	NK	NK	NK	N/A	NK	66	4	Walker	Crossing tower is a spire
St Albans Cathedral	Cathedral and Abbey Church of St Alban	51°45′02″N 0°20′34″W	Anglican	Canterbury	1077	1077	1877	167.8	85	NK	20.2	N/A	43.9	73	4	Harrison & Harrison	
Salisbury Cathedral	Cathedral Church of the Blessed Virgin Mary	51°03′53″N 1°47′51″W	Anglican	Canterbury	1220	1320	1227	135	NK	NK	NK	N/A	123	65	4	Willis	Crossing tower is a spire.
Southwark Cathedral	Cathedral and Collegiate Church of St Saviour and St Mary Overie	51°30′22″N 0°05′23″W	Anglican	Canterbury	1106	1897	1905	NK	NK	NK	NK	N/A	NK	61	4	Harrison & Harrison	
Truro Cathedral	Cathedral Church of St Mary	50°15′51″N 5°03′04″W	Anglican	Canterbury	1880	1910	1880	NK	NK	NK	NK	61	76	45	4	Willis	Towers are spires
Wells Cathedral	Cathedral Church of St Andrew	51°12′37″N 2°38′38″W	Anglican	Canterbury	1176	1490	1239	126.5	NK	NK	20.5	NK	55	67	4	Willis	
Winchester Cathedral	Cathedral Church of the Holy Trinity, St Peter, St Paul and St Swithun	51°03′36″N 1°18′44″W	Anglican	Canterbury	1079	NK	650	170.1	NK	NK	NK	N/A	46	80	4	Willis, Harrison & Harrison	
Worcester Cathedral	Cathedral Church of Christ and the Blessed Virgin Mary	52°11′19″N 2°13′15″W	Anglican	Canterbury	1084	1504	743	130	53	NK	20	N/A	62	57	4	Tickell	
Blackburn Cathedral	Cathedral Church of St Mary	53°44′50″N 2°28′53″W	Anglican	York	1820	NK	1926	NK	NK	NK	NK	NK	NK	61	4	David Wood	Crossing tower has a small spire
Bradford Cathedral	Cathedral Church of St Peter	53°47′43″N 1°44′52″W	Anglican	York	1400	NK	1919	NK	NK	NK	NK	NK	N/A	72	4	Walker	Single West tower.
Carlisle Cathedral	Cathedral Church of the Holy and Undivided Trinity	54°53′41″N 2°56′19″W	Anglican	York	1122	NK	1113	NK	NK	NK	NK	N/A	NK	72	4	Walker	Most of nave has been demolished.
Chester Cathedral	Cathedral Church of Christ and the Blessed Virgin Mary	53°11′31″N 2°53′25″W	Anglican	York	1093	NK	1541	108	NK	NK	24	N/A	39	71	4	Rushworth and Dreaper	
Durham Cathedral	Cathedral Church of Christ, the Blessed Virgin Mary and St Cuthbert	54°46′23″N 1°34′36″W	Anglican	York	1093	1133	997	143	NK	NK	22	44	66	98	4	Harrison and Harrison	
Liverpool Cathedral	Cathedral Church of Christ	53°23′51″N 2°58′24″W	Anglican	York	1904	1978	1904	188.7	NK	NK	35.3	N/A	100.8	152	5	Willis	
Manchester Cathedral	Cathedral and Collegiate Church of St Mary, St Denys and St George	53°29′06″N 2°14′40″W	Anglican	York	1421	NK	1847	NK	NK	NK	NK	41	N/A	81	4	Tickell	There is only 1 western tower
Newcastle Cathedral	Cathedral Church of St Nicholas	54°58′12″N 1°36′40″W	Anglican	York	1080	1500	1882	NK	NK	NK	NK	NK	N/A	93	4	Nicholson	There is only 1 western tower, surmounted by a crown steeple
Peel Cathedral	Cathedral Church of St German	54°13′31″N 4°42′00″W	Anglican	York	1879	1884	1980	NK	NK	NK	NK	NK	N/A	25	2	Brindley and Foster	There is only 1 western tower
Ripon Cathedral	Cathedral Church of St Peter and St Wilfrid	54°08′06″N 1°31′13″W	Anglican	York	1160	1547	1836	NK	NK	NK	NK	NK	NK	59	4	Harrison and Harrison	
Sheffield Cathedral	Cathedral Church of St Peter and St Paul	53°22′59″N 1°28′09″W	Anglican	York	1200	1966	1914	NK	NK	NK	NK	NK	NK	64	5	Mander	Organ noted as having been removed, but no replacement indicated
Southwell Minster	Cathedral and Parish Church of the Blessed Virgin Mary	53°04′36″N 0°57′15″W	Anglican	York	1108	1300	1884	NK	NK	NK	NK	NK	NK	51	4	Hill. Norman and Beard	Western towers are spires
Wakefield Cathedral	Cathedral Church of All Saints	53°40′59″N 1°29′48″W	Anglican	York	1300	NK	1888	NK	NK	NK	NK	75	N/A	90	5	Compton	There is only 1 Western tower, surmounted by a spire
York Minster	Cathedral and Metropolitical Church of St Peter	53°57′45″N 1°04′55″W	Anglican	York	1220	1472	300	159.9	NK	NK	30	60	72	84	4	J.W. Walker and Sons	Mother church of the province of York
Christ Church Cathedral (Falkland Islands)	Christ Church Cathedral (Falkland Islands)	51°41′32″S 57°51′31″W	Anglican	Canterbury	1890	1892	1892	NK	NK	NK	NK	NK	NK	NK	2	Built in Ireland	Bishop is the Archbishop of Canterbury
Brentwood Cathedral	Cathedral Church of St Mary and St Helen	51°37′11″N 0°18′24″E	Catholic	Westminster	NK	NK	1917	NK	NK	NK	NK	NK	NK	48	3	Percy Daniel	NK
St John the Baptist Cathedral, Norwich	Cathedral Church of St John the Baptist	52°37′45″N 1°17′02″E	Catholic	Westminster	NK	NK	1976	NK	NK	NK	NK	NK	NK	15	2	NK	NK
Northampton Cathedral	Cathedral Church of Our Lady and St Thomas of Canterbury	52°14′53″N 0°53′55″W	Catholic	Westminster	NK	NK	1850	NK	NK	NK	NK	NK	NK	10	2	Brugengate	NK
Nottingham Cathedral	Cathedral Church of St Barnabas	52°57′17″N 1°09′26″W	Catholic	Westminster	NK	NK	1850	NK	NK	NK	NK	NK	NK	43	3	Hill Norman and Beard	NK
Westminster Cathedral	Cathedral Church of the Most Holy Blood, St Mary, St Joseph and St Peter	51°29′45″N 0°08′23″W	Catholic	Westminster	NK	NK	1910	NK	NK	NK	NK	NK	NK	78	4	Willis	NK
Birmingham Cathedral	Cathedral and Metropolitical Church of St Chad	52°29′08″N 1°53′55″W	Catholic	Birmingham	NK	NK	1839	NK	NK	NK	NK	NK	NK	40	3	Nicholson	NK
Clifton Cathedral	Cathedral Church of St Peter and St Paul	51°27′35″N 2°36′59″W	Catholic	Birmingham	NK	NK	1973	NK	NK	NK	NK	NK	NK	28	3	Reiger	NK
Shrewsbury Cathedral	Cathedral Church of Our Lady Help of Christians and St Peter Alcantara	52°42′19″N 2°45′14″W	Catholic	Birmingham	NK	NK	1850	NK	NK	NK	NK	NK	NK	27	2	Mander	NK
Lancaster Cathedral	Cathedral Church of St Peter	54°02′49″N 2°47′38″W	Catholic	Liverpool	NK	NK	1924	NK	NK	NK	NK	NK	NK	43	3	Willis	NK
Leeds Cathedral	Cathedral Church of St Anne	53°48′02″N 1°32′49″W	Catholic	Liverpool	NK	NK	1878	NK	NK	NK	NK	NK	NK	49	4	Hill, Norman and Beard	NK
Liverpool Metropolitan Cathedral	Cathedral and Metropolitical Church of Christ the King	53°24′17″N 2°58′06″W	Catholic	Liverpool	NK	NK	1967	NK	NK	NK	NK	NK	NK	88	4	Walker	NK
Middlesbrough Cathedral	Cathedral Church of St Mary	54°31′22″N 1°12′49″W	Catholic	Liverpool	NK	NK	1983	NK	NK	NK	NK	NK	NK	16	2	Schumacher	NK
St Mary's Cathedral, Newcastle upon Tyne	Cathedral Church of St Mary	54°58′09″N 1°37′09″W	Catholic	Liverpool	NK	NK	1882	NK	NK	NK	NK	NK	NK	46	3	Tickell	NK
Salford Cathedral	Cathedral Church of St John the Evangelist	53°29′01″N 2°15′40″W	Catholic	Liverpool	NK	NK	1850	NK	NK	NK	NK	NK	NK	30	2	Compton	NK
Sheffield Cathedral	Cathedral Church of St Marie	53°22′53″N 1°28′05″W	Catholic	Liverpool	NK	NK	1980	NK	NK	NK	NK	NK	NK	24	3	Lewis	NK
Arundel Cathedral	Cathedral Church of Our Lady and St Philip Howard	50°51′19″N 0°33′33″W	Catholic	Southwark	NK	NK	1965	NK	NK	NK	NK	NK	NK	39	3	Wells	NK
Plymouth Cathedral	Cathedral Church of St Mary and St Boniface	50°22′25″N 4°09′06″W	Catholic	Southwark	NK	NK	1858	NK	NK	NK	NK	NK	NK	29	3	Hele	NK
Portsmouth Cathedral	Cathedral Church of St John the Evangelist	50°48′01″N 1°05′38″W	Catholic	Southwark	NK	NK	1882	NK	NK	NK	NK	NK	NK	51	3	Mander	NK
St George's Cathedral	Cathedral and Metropolitical Church of St George	51°29′52″N 0°06′28″W	Catholic	Southwark	NK	NK	1850	NK	NK	NK	NK	NK	NK	72	3	Compton	NK
Aldershot Cathedral	Cathedral Church of St Michael and St George	51°15′36″N 0°45′36″W	Catholic	It is exempt, i.e. directly subject to the Holy See (not part of any ecclesiastical province).	NK	NK	1972	NK	NK	NK	NK	NK	NK	30	2	Hele	Organ currently unusable
Church of Our Lady of the Assumption and St Gregory	Church of Our Lady of the Assumption and St Gregory	51°30′40″N 0°08′17″W	Catholic	N/A	NK	NK	2013	NK	NK	NK	NK	NK	NK	NK	NK	NK	NK
Ukrainian Catholic Cathedral of the Holy Family in Exile, London	Cathedral Church of the Holy Family in Exile	51°30′48″N 0°09′02″W	Ukrainian Greek Catholic	N/A	NK	NK	1968	NK	NK	NK	NK	NK	NK	N/A	N/A	N/A	NK
Syro-Malabar Cathedral of St. Alphonsa, Preston	Cathedral Church of St Alphonsa	53°45′49″N 2°41′48″W	Syro-Malabar Catholic	N/A	NK	NK	2016	NK	NK	NK	NK	NK	NK	NK	NK	NK	NK
London Cathedral	Cathedral Church of St George		Antiochian Orthodox Church	N/A	NK	NK	1989	NK	NK	NK	NK	NK	NK	NK	NK	NK	NK
St. George's Cathedral, Stevenage	Cathedral Church of St George	51°53′11″N 0°10′48″W	Coptic Orthodox Church	N/A	NK	NK	2002	NK	NK	NK	NK	NK	NK	NK	NK	NK	NK
Birmingham Orthodox Cathedral	Cathedral Church of the Dormition of the Mother of God and St Andrew	52°28′58″N 1°54′51″W	Greek Orthodox	N/A	NK	NK	NK	NK	NK	NK	NK	NK	NK	N/A	N/A	N/A	NK
Leicester Orthodox Cathedral	Cathedral Church of St Nicholas and St Xenophon	52°37′22″N 1°08′08″W	Greek Orthodox	N/A	NK	NK	NK	NK	NK	NK	NK	NK	NK	NK	NK	NK	NK
Camden Town Orthodox Cathedral	Cathedral Church of All Saints	51°32′20″N 0°08′16″W	Greek Orthodox	N/A	NK	NK	1991	NK	NK	NK	NK	NK	NK	NK	NK	NK	NK
St Sophia's Cathedral, London	Cathedral and Metropolitical Church of St Sophia	51°30′45″N 0°11′29″W	Greek Orthodox	N/A	NK	NK	1922	NK	NK	NK	NK	NK	NK	NK	NK	NK	NK
London Orthodox Cathedral	Cathedral Church of the Dormition of the Mother of God	51°36′04″N 0°06′53″W	Greek Orthodox	N/A	NK	NK	NK	NK	NK	NK	NK	NK	NK	NK	NK	NK	NK
London Orthodox Cathedral	Cathedral Church of the Nativity of the Mother of God	51°28′31″N 0°05′41″W	Greek Orthodox	N/A	NK	NK	NK	NK	NK	NK	NK	NK	NK	NK	NK	NK	NK
London Orthodox Cathedral	Cathedral Church of St Andrew	51°32′44″N 0°08′29″W	Greek Orthodox	N/A	NK	NK	1970	NK	NK	NK	NK	NK	NK	NK	NK	NK	NK
London Orthodox Cathedral	Cathedral Church of St Nicholas	51°30′15″N 0°13′59″W	Greek Orthodox	N/A	NK	NK	NK	NK	NK	NK	NK	NK	NK	NK	NK	NK	NK
London Orthodox Cathedral	Cathedral Church of the Holy Cross and St Michael	51°34′26″N 0°12′06″W	Greek Orthodox	N/A	NK	NK	NK	NK	NK	NK	NK	NK	NK	NK	NK	NK	NK
London Orthodox Cathedral	Cathedral Church of the Dormition and All Saints	51°30′02″N 0°10′09″W	Russian Orthodox	N/A	NK	NK	NK	NK	NK	NK	NK	NK	NK	NK	NK	NK	NK
London Orthodox Cathedral	Cathedral of the Dormition of the Most Holy Mother of God and Holy Royal Martyrs	51°29′23″N 0°16′34″W	Russian Orthodox	N/A	NK	NK	1999	NK	NK	NK	NK	NK	NK	NK	NK	NK	NK
St Thomas' Cathedral, East Acton	Cathedral Church of Saint Thomas	51°30′30″N 0°14′47″W	Syriac Orthodox Church	N/A	NK	NK	2012	NK	NK	NK	NK	NK	NK	NK	NK	NK	NK
London Cathedral	Ukrainian Autocephalous Orthodox Cathedral of the Holy Transfiguration of our Saviour	51°30′15″N 0°16′07″W	Ukrainian Autocephalous Orthodox Church	N/A	NK	NK	NK	NK	NK	NK	NK	NK	NK	NK	NK	NK	NK
Stamford Hill Cathedral	Georgian Orthodox Cathedral Church of the Nativity of Our Lord	51°34′24″N 0°04′00″W	Georgian Orthodox Church	N/A	NK	NK	NK	NK	NK	NK	NK	NK	NK	NK	NK	NK	NK
Newcastle upon Tyne Cathedral	Cathedral Church of St Willibrord and All Saints	NK	Evangelical Presbyterian	N/A	NK	NK	NK	NK	NK	NK	NK	NK	NK	NK	NK	NK	NK
Canterbury Anglican Catholic Cathedral	Pro-Cathedral Church of St Augustine of Canterbury	51°16′49″N 1°04′46″E	Anglican Catholic Church	N/A	NK	NK	2018	NK	NK	NK	NK	NK	NK	NK	NK	NK	NK
Stoke-on-Trent Cathedral	Cathedral Church of Our Lady of Grace	53°02′20″N 2°12′15″W	Holy Catholic Church (Anglican Rite)	N/A	NK	NK	NK	NK	NK	NK	NK	NK	NK	NK	NK	NK	NK
Putney Cathedral	Pro-Cathedral Church of All Saints	51°27′41″N 0°13′13″W	Liberal Catholic Church	N/A	NK	NK	NK	NK	NK	NK	NK	NK	NK	NK	NK	NK	NK
Windlesham Cathedral	Cathedral Church of St George	NK	Traditional Church of England	N/A	NK	NK	NK	NK	NK	NK	NK	NK	NK	NK	NK	NK	NK
Bangor Cathedral	Cathedral Church of St Deiniol	53°13′36″N 4°07′39″W	Anglican	Church in Wales	NK	NK	456	NK	NK	NK	NK	NK	NK	75	4	Compton	NK
Brecon Cathedral	Cathedral Church of St John the Evangelist	NK	Anglican	Church in Wales	NK	NK	1923	NK	NK	NK	NK	NK	NK	50	3	Hill, Norman and Beard	NK
Llandaff Cathedral	Cathedral Church of St Peter and St Paul, St. Dyfrig, St. Telio and St. Euddogwy	NK	Anglican	Church in Wales	NK	NK	550	NK	NK	NK	NK	NK	NK	78	4	Nicholson	NK
Newport Cathedral	Cathedral Church of St Woolos	NK	Anglican	Church in Wales	NK	NK	1921	NK	NK	NK	NK	NK	NK	45	4	Hill, Norman and Beard	NK
St Asaph Cathedral	Cathedral Church of St Asaph	NK	Anglican	Church in Wales	NK	NK	553	NK	NK	NK	NK	NK	NK	54	4	Hill, Norman and Beard	NK
St David's Cathedral	Cathedral Church of St David	NK	Anglican	Church in Wales	NK	NK	580	NK	NK	NK	NK	NK	NK	54	4	Willis, Harrison	NK
Cardiff Cathedral	Cathedral and Metropolitical Church of St David	NK	Catholic	Cardiff	NK	NK	1916	NK	NK	NK	NK	NK	NK	48	3	Compton	NK
Swansea Cathedral	Cathedral Church of St Joseph	NK	Catholic	Cardiff	NK	NK	1987	NK	NK	NK	NK	NK	NK	21	2	Wordsworth	NK
Wrexham Cathedral	Cathedral Church of Our Lady of Sorrows	NK	Catholic	Cardiff	NK	NK	1907	NK	NK	NK	NK	NK	NK	NK	NK	NK	NK
St Machar, Aberdeen	NK	57°10′11″N 2°06′08″W	Church of Scotland		NK	NK	1131 (1689)	NK	NK	NK	NK	NK	NK	46	3	Rushworth and Dreaper	NK
Brechin Cathedral	NK	56°43′55″N 2°39′42″W	Church of Scotland		NK	NK	c. 1250 (1689)	NK	NK	NK	NK	NK	NK	38	3	Rushworth and Dreaper	NK
Dornoch Cathedral	NK	57°52′52″N 4°01′47″W	Church of Scotland		NK	NK	c. 1250 (1689)	NK	NK	NK	NK	NK	NK	22	2	Nicholson	NK
Dunblane Cathedral	NK	56°11′22″N 3°57′55″W	Church of Scotland		NK	NK	c. 650 (1689)	NK	NK	NK	NK	NK	NK	41	3	Flentrop	NK
Dunkeld Cathedral	NK	56°33′54″N 3°35′23″W	Church of Scotland		NK	NK	1260 (1689)	NK	NK	NK	NK	NK	NK	16	2	Bevington	NK
St Giles, Edinburgh	NK	55°56′58″N 3°11′27″W	Church of Scotland		NK	NK	c. 1150 (1689)	NK	NK	NK	NK	NK	NK	59	3	Rieger	NK
Glasgow Cathedral	NK	55.863°N 4.2346°W	Church of Scotland		NK	NK	1136 (1689)	NK	NK	NK	NK	NK	NK	64	4	Willis	NK
St Magnus, Kirkwall	NK	58°58′56″N 2°57′32″W	Church of Scotland		NK	NK	1137 (1689)	NK	NK	NK	NK	NK	NK	42	3	Willis	NK
St Moluag's Cathedral, Lismore	NK	56°32′04″N 5°28′50″W	Church of Scotland		NK	NK	592 (1689)	NK	NK	NK	NK	NK	NK	NK	NK	NK	NK
Aberdeen Cathedral	NK	57°08′57″N 2°05′34″W	Anglican	Scottish Episcopal	NK	NK	1817	NK	NK	NK	NK	NK	NK	29	3	Rushworth and Dreaper	NK
Dundee Cathedral	NK	56°27′40″N 2°58′05″W	Anglican	Scottish Episcopal	NK	NK	1855	NK	NK	NK	NK	NK	NK	40	3	Hill	NK
Edinburgh - St Mary’s Episcopal Cathedral (Anglican)	St Mary’s Episcopal Cathedral, Palmerston Place, Edinburgh	55°56′55″N 3°12′59″W	Anglican	Scottish Episcopal	NK	NK	1879	NK	NK	NK	NK	NK	NK	NK	NK	NK	NK
Glasgow Cathedral	NK	55°52′24″N 4°16′30″W	Anglican	Scottish Episcopal	NK	NK	1871	NK	NK	NK	NK	NK	NK	NK	NK	NK	NK
Inverness Cathedral	NK	57°28′28″N 4°13′45″W	Anglican	Scottish Episcopal	NK	NK	1869	NK	NK	NK	NK	NK	NK	NK	NK	NK	NK
Millport Cathedral	NK	55°45′20″N 4°55′27″W	Anglican	Scottish Episcopal	NK	NK	1882	NK	NK	NK	NK	NK	NK	NK	NK	NK	NK
Oban Cathedral	NK	NK	Anglican	Scottish Episcopal	NK	NK	1864	NK	NK	NK	NK	NK	NK	NK	NK	NK	NK
Perth Cathedral	NK	NK	Anglican	Scottish Episcopal	NK	NK	1850	NK	NK	NK	NK	NK	NK	NK	NK	NK	NK
Aberdeen Cathedral	Cathedral Church of St Mary of the Assumption	57°08′43″N 2°06′23″W	Catholic	St Andrews and Edinburgh	NK	NK	1880	NK	NK	NK	NK	NK	NK	NK	NK	NK	NK
Ayr Cathedral	Cathedral Church of St Margaret	NK	Catholic	St Andrews and Edinburgh	NK	NK	1822	NK	NK	NK	NK	NK	NK	NK	NK	NK	NK
Dundee Cathedral	NK	56°27′27″N 2°58′29″W	Catholic	St Andrews and Edinburgh	NK	NK	1782	NK	NK	NK	NK	NK	NK	NK	NK	NK	NK
Edinburgh - St Mary’s Catholic Cathedral (Roman Catholic)	TBD	55°57′22″N 3°11′16″W	Catholic	St Andrews and Edinburgh	NK	NK	1814	NK	NK	NK	NK	NK	NK	NK	NK	NK	NK
Oban Cathedral	NK	NK	Catholic	St Andrews and Edinburgh	NK	NK	1932	NK	NK	NK	NK	NK	NK	NK	NK	NK	NK
St Andrew's Cathedral, Glasgow	NK	55°51′20″N 4°15′10″W	Catholic	Glasgow	NK	NK	1797	NK	NK	NK	NK	NK	NK	NK	NK	NK	NK
Motherwell Cathedral	NK	55°47′29″N 3°59′13″W	Catholic	Glasgow	NK	NK	1947	NK	NK	NK	NK	NK	NK	NK	NK	NK	NK
Paisley Cathedral	NK	55°50′51″N 4°25′00″W	Catholic	Glasgow	NK	NK	1948	NK	NK	NK	NK	NK	NK	NK	NK	NK	NK
Glasgow Orthodox Cathedral	NK	NK	Greek Orthodox	N/A	NK	NK	1954	NK	NK	NK	NK	NK	NK	NK	NK	NK	NK
Armagh Cathedral	NK	54°21′08″N 6°39′37″W	Catholic	Armagh	NK	NK	1870	NK	NK	NK	NK	NK	NK	NK	NK	NK	NK
Belfast Cathedral	NK	54°35′57″N 5°56′40″W	Catholic	Armagh	NK	NK	1866	NK	NK	NK	NK	NK	NK	NK	NK	NK	NK
Cavan Cathedral	NK	53°59′54″N 7°21′40″W	Catholic	Armagh	NK	NK	1942	NK	NK	NK	NK	NK	NK	NK	NK	NK	NK
Derry Cathedral	NK	55°00′00″N 7°19′42″W	Catholic	Armagh	NK	NK	1873	NK	NK	NK	NK	NK	NK	NK	NK	NK	NK
Letterkenny Cathedral	NK	54°57′01″N 7°44′24″W	Catholic	Armagh	NK	NK	1901	NK	NK	NK	NK	NK	NK	NK	NK	NK	NK
Longford Cathedral	NK	53°43′38″N 7°47′47″W	Catholic	Armagh	NK	NK	1840	NK	NK	NK	NK	NK	NK	NK	NK	NK	NK
Monaghan Cathedral	NK	54°14′41″N 6°57′31″W	Catholic	Armagh	NK	NK	1892	NK	NK	NK	NK	NK	NK	NK	NK	NK	NK
Mullingar Cathedral	NK	53°31′37″N 7°20′47″W	Catholic	Armagh	NK	NK	1936	NK	NK	NK	NK	NK	NK	NK	NK	NK	NK
Newry Cathedral	NK	54°10′29″N 6°20′16″W	Catholic	Armagh	NK	NK	1829	NK	NK	NK	NK	NK	NK	NK	NK	NK	NK
Armagh Cathedral	NK	54°20′51″N 6°39′23″W	Church of Ireland	Armagh	NK	NK	445	NK	NK	NK	NK	NK	NK	NK	NK	NK	NK
Belfast Cathedral	NK	54°36′10″N 5°55′43″W	Church of Ireland	Armagh	NK	NK	1904	NK	NK	NK	NK	NK	NK	NK	NK	NK	NK
Clogher Cathedral	NK	54°24′39″N 7°10′19″W	Church of Ireland	Armagh	NK	NK	1744	NK	NK	NK	NK	NK	NK	NK	NK	NK	NK
Derry Cathedral	NK	54°59′38″N 7°19′23″W	Church of Ireland	Armagh	NK	NK	1633	NK	NK	NK	NK	NK	NK	NK	NK	NK	NK
Down Cathedral	NK	54°19′40″N 5°43′16″W	Church of Ireland	Armagh	NK	NK	1818	NK	NK	NK	NK	NK	NK	NK	NK	NK	NK
Dromore Cathedral	NK	54°24′53″N 6°09′06″W	Church of Ireland	Armagh	NK	NK	1609	NK	NK	NK	NK	NK	NK	NK	NK	NK	NK
Enniskillen Cathedral	NK	54°20′48″N 7°38′28″W	Church of Ireland	Armagh	NK	NK	1923	NK	NK	NK	NK	NK	NK	NK	NK	NK	NK
Killala Cathedral	NK	54°12′44″N 9°13′15″W	Church of Ireland	Armagh	NK	NK	c. 1650	NK	NK	NK	NK	NK	NK	NK	NK	NK	NK
Kilmore Cathedral	NK	53°59′35″N 07°24′46″W	Church of Ireland	Armagh	NK	NK	1860	NK	NK	NK	NK	NK	NK	NK	NK	NK	NK
Lisburn Cathedral	NK	54°30′41″N 6°02′30″W	Church of Ireland	Armagh	NK	NK	1662	NK	NK	NK	NK	NK	NK	NK	NK	NK	NK
Raphoe Cathedral	NK	54°52′26″N 7°35′53″W	Church of Ireland	Armagh	NK	NK	c. 850	NK	NK	NK	NK	NK	NK	NK	NK	NK	NK
Sligo Cathedral	NK	54°16′13″N 8°28′38″W	Church of Ireland	Armagh	NK	NK	1874	NK	NK	NK	NK	NK	NK	NK	NK	NK	NK
Tuam Cathedral	NK	53°30′50″N 8°51′19″W	Church of Ireland	Armagh	NK	NK	c. 1850	NK	NK	NK	NK	NK	NK	NK	NK	NK	NK
Bodmin	St Petroc's Church, Bodmin	50.4714°N 4.7168°W	NK	NK	NK	NK	833 (870)	NK	NK	NK	NK	NK	NK	NK	NK	NK	NK
Bradwell-on-Sea, Essex	Chapel of St Peter-on-the-Wall	51°44′07″N 0°56′24″E	NK	NK	NK	NK	654 (664)	NK	NK	NK	NK	NK	NK	NK	NK	NK	NK
Canterbury, Kent	St Martin's Church, Canterbury	51.277989°N 1.093825°E	NK	NK	NK	NK	597 (602)	NK	NK	NK	NK	NK	NK	6	2	Walker	NK
St Mary and St Cuthbert, Chester-le-Street	Collegiate Church of St Mary and St Cuthbert	54.855944°N 1.571972°W	NK	NK	NK	NK	883 (995)	NK	NK	NK	NK	NK	NK	26	2	Harrison & Harrison	NK
Crediton Parish Church	Collegiate Church of the Holy Cross and the Mother of Him Who Hung Thereon	50°47′22.70″N 3°39′8.21″W	NK	NK	NK	NK	905 (1050)	NK	NK	NK	NK	NK	NK	46	3	Harrison & Harrison	NK
Dommoc	NK	52°16′10″N 1°41′11″E 51°58′22″N 1°22′48″E	NK	NK	NK	NK	630 (850)	NK	NK	NK	NK	NK	NK	N/A	N/A	N/A	NK
Dorchester Abbey	Abbey Church of St Peter & St Paul	51°38′37″N 1°09′51″W	NK	NK	NK	NK	635 (1072)	NK	NK	NK	NK	NK	NK	NK	NK	NK	Lost cathedral status 660–675 and 685/737–875
Durham	The White Church, Durham	54°46′24″N 1°34′36″W	NK	NK	NK	NK	998 (1104)	NK	NK	NK	NK	NK	NK	NK	NK	NK	NK
Exeter	The Minster of Saint Mary and Saint Peter, Exeter	50°43′21″N 3°31′52″W	NK	NK	NK	NK	1050 (1183)	NK	NK	NK	NK	NK	NK	NK	NK	NK	NK
Hexham Abbey	Priory and Parish Church of St. Andrew	54°58′17″N 2°06′10″W	NK	NK	NK	NK	678 (821)	NK	NK	NK	NK	NK	NK	NK	NK	NK	NK
Hoxne Priory	Church of Saint Peter and St Paul	52.352192°N 1.201719°E	NK	NK	NK	NK	950 (1040)	NK	NK	NK	NK	NK	NK	NK	NK	NK	NK
Leicester, Leicestershire	NK	52.635147°N 1.140914°W	NK	NK	NK	NK	679 (874)	NK	NK	NK	NK	NK	NK	NK	NK	NK	NK
Lindisfarne Priory	NK	55.669389°N 1.801922°W	NK	NK	NK	NK	635 (875)	NK	NK	NK	NK	NK	NK	NK	NK	NK	NK
North Elmham	NK	52°45′20″N 0°56′41″E	NK	NK	NK	NK	673 (1070)	NK	NK	NK	NK	NK	NK	NK	NK	NK	NK
Padstow, Cornwall	St Petroc's Church, Padstow	50.541269°N 4.942856°W	NK	NK	NK	NK	518 (564)	NK	NK	NK	NK	NK	NK	NK	NK	NK	NK
Ramsbury, Wiltshire	NK	51°26′31″N 1°36′22″W	NK	NK	NK	NK	909 (1058)	NK	NK	NK	NK	NK	NK	NK	NK	NK	NK
Repton	NK	52.84115°N 1.551695°W	NK	NK	NK	NK	655 (669)	NK	NK	NK	NK	NK	NK	NK	NK	NK	NK
Ripon	Minster church of St Peter	54°08′06″N 1°31′13″W	NK	NK	NK	NK	679 (686)	NK	NK	NK	NK	NK	NK	NK	NK	NK	NK
St German's Priory	NK	50°23′48″N 4°18′35″W	NK	NK	NK	NK	c. 925 (1027)	NK	NK	NK	NK	NK	NK	NK	NK	NK	NK
Selsey Abbey	Abbey Church of St Peter	50°45′18″N 0°45′55″W	NK	NK	NK	NK	681 (1075)	NK	NK	NK	NK	NK	NK	NK	NK	NK	NK
Sherborne Abbey	Abbey Church of St Mary the Virgin	50°56′48″N 2°31′00″W	NK	NK	NK	NK	705 (1075)	73	NK	NK	18	N/A	33	45	3	Gray & Davison, J.W. Walker & Sons, John Coulson, Bishop & Son, Kenneth Tickell	Cathedral status removed in 1075, when the Bishopric was transferred to old Sarum.
Soham	NK	52.333478°N 0.336942°E	NK	NK	NK	NK	630 (950)	NK	NK	NK	NK	NK	NK	NK	NK	NK	NK
Stow Minster	Minster Church of St Mary	53°19′39″N 0°40′38″W	NK	NK	NK	NK	680 (875)	NK	NK	NK	NK	NK	NK	NK	NK	NK	NK
Bishop's Tawton	NK	51°03′08″N 4°02′53″W	NK	NK	NK	NK	905 (909)	NK	NK	NK	NK	NK	NK	NK	NK	NK	NK
Wells, Somerset	Minster of St Andrew	51°12′36″N 2°38′38″W	NK	NK	NK	NK	909 (1175)	NK	NK	NK	NK	NK	NK	NK	NK	NK	NK
Welsh Bicknor	NK	51.8561°N 2.5935°W	NK	NK	NK	NK	c. 550 (c. 750)	NK	NK	NK	NK	NK	NK	NK	NK	NK	NK
Bath Abbey	Priory Church of St Peter & St Paul	51°22′53″N 2°21′32″W	NK	NK	NK	NK	1090 (1539)	NK	NK	NK	NK	NK	NK	NK	NK	NK	NK
St John the Baptist's Church, Chester	Collegiate Church of St John the Baptist	53°11′20″N 2°53′09″W	NK	NK	NK	NK	1075 (1102)	NK	NK	NK	NK	NK	NK	NK	NK	NK	NK
Coventry	St. Mary's Priory and Cathedral	52.4089°N 1.5085°W	NK	NK	NK	NK	1102 (1539)	NK	NK	NK	NK	NK	NK	NK	NK	NK	NK
Glastonbury Abbey	NK	51.145648°N 2.715318°W	NK	NK	NK	NK	1195 (1218)	NK	NK	NK	NK	NK	NK	NK	NK	NK	NK
Old Sarum Cathedral	NK	51°05′39″N 1°48′23″W	NK	NK	NK	NK	1075 (1219)	NK	NK	NK	NK	NK	NK	NK	NK	NK	NK
Thetford	Minster of St Mary the Greater	52.413527°N 0.744477°E	NK	NK	NK	NK	1072 (1094)	NK	NK	NK	NK	NK	NK	NK	NK	NK	NK
Guildford	Holy Trinity Church, Guildford	NK	Anglican	Canterbury	NK	NK	1927 (1961)	NK	NK	NK	NK	NK	NK	36	3	Rushworth and Dreaper	NK
Liverpool	Pro-Cathedral of St. Peter	53°24′18″N 2°59′03″W	Anglican	York	NK	NK	1880 (1919)	NK	NK	NK	NK	NK	NK	NK	NK	NK	NK
Osney Abbey	Abbey Church of St Mary	51°44′59″N 1°16′12″W	NK	NK	NK	NK	1542 (1545)	NK	NK	NK	NK	NK	NK	NK	NK	NK	NK
Westminster Abbey	Collegiate Church of Saint Peter at Westminster	51°29′58″N 0°07′39″W	NK	NK	NK	NK	1540 (1550)	NK	NK	NK	NK	NK	NK	NK	NK	NK	NK
St Mary Moorfields	NK	51°31′7.64″N 0°5′8.57″W	Catholic	Westminster	NK	NK	1852 (1869)	NK	NK	NK	NK	NK	NK	NK	NK	NK	NK
Clifton, Bristol	Pro-Cathedral of the Holy Apostles	51.456297°N 2.609720°W	NK	NK	NK	NK	1850 (1973)	NK	NK	NK	NK	NK	NK	34	3	Hill, Norman and Beard	NK
Belmont Abbey, Herefordshire	NK	52.03932°N 2.756412°W	NK	NK	NK	NK	1854 (1920)	NK	NK	NK	NK	NK	NK	NK	NK	NK	NK
Our Lady of Victories, Kensington	NK	51°29′57″N 0°11′52″W	NK	NK	NK	NK	1869 (1903)	NK	NK	NK	NK	NK	NK	NK	NK	NK	NK
Liverpool	Pro-Cathedral of St. Nicholas	53°24′25″N 2°58′30″W	NK	NK	NK	NK	1850 (1967)	NK	NK	NK	NK	NK	NK	NK	NK	NK	NK
Middlesbrough	Our Lady Of Perpetual Succour	54°34′48″N 1°14′13″W	NK	NK	NK	NK	1878 (1983)	NK	NK	NK	NK	NK	NK	NK	NK	NK	NK
Plymouth	Our Lady and St John the Evangelist Church	50.3703°N 4.1593°W	NK	NK	NK	NK	1850 (1858)	NK	NK	NK	NK	NK	NK	NK	NK	NK	NK
St Joseph's Church, Southampton	St Joseph's Church	50.899072°N 1.405937°W	Catholic	Westminster	NK	NK	1882 (1882)	NK	NK	NK	NK	NK	NK	NK	NK	NK	NK
Southwark	Archbishop Amigo Jubilee Hall	51.456297°N 2.609720°W	NK	NK	NK	NK	1942 (1958)	NK	NK	NK	NK	NK	NK	NK	NK	NK	NK
St George's Roman Catholic Church, York	NK	53.9550°N 1.0758°W	NK	NK	NK	NK	1850 (1864)	NK	NK	NK	NK	NK	NK	NK	NK	NK	NK
York Oratory	Oratory Church of St Wilfrid	53.961900°N 1.084700°W	Catholic	Liverpool	1862	1864	1864 (1878)	NK	NK	NK	NK	45	NK	NK	3	Forster and Andrews	NK
Abercorn	NK	55.99334°N 3.47326°W	NK	NK	NK	NK	685	NK	NK	NK	NK	NK	NK	NK	NK	NK	NK
Abernethy, Perth and Kinross	NK	56.333143°N 3.311670°W	NK	NK	NK	NK	750 (1050)	NK	NK	NK	NK	NK	NK	NK	NK	NK	NK
Birnie Kirk	NK	57°36′41″N 3°19′48″W	NK	NK	NK	NK	1140 (1184)	NK	NK	NK	NK	NK	NK	NK	NK	NK	NK
Birsay (Orkney)	St Magnus' Kirk	59.129444°N 3.316389°W	NK	NK	NK	NK	1050 (1137)	NK	NK	NK	NK	NK	NK	NK	NK	NK	NK
Elgin Cathedral	Cathedral of the Holy Trinity	57°39′02″N 03°18′20″W	NK	NK	NK	NK	1224 (1560)	NK	NK	NK	NK	NK	NK	NK	NK	NK	NK
Fortrose Cathedral	Cathedral of Saint Peter and Saint Boniface of Fortrose	57.580885°N 4.130495°W	NK	NK	NK	NK	c. 1250 (c. 1650)	NK	NK	NK	NK	NK	NK	NK	NK	NK	NK
Iona Abbey	St Mary's Cathedral	56.326127°N 6.400438°W	NK	NK	NK	NK	c. 650 (c. 950)	NK	NK	NK	NK	NK	NK	NK	NK	NK	NK
Kinneddar	Kirk of Kinneddar	57.709451°N 3.305645°W	NK	NK	NK	NK	1187 (1208)	NK	NK	NK	NK	NK	NK	NK	NK	NK	NK
Lismore Kirk	St Moluag's Cathedral, Lismore	56°32′4″N 5°28′50″W	NK	NK	NK	NK	1200 (1650)	NK	NK	NK	NK	NK	NK	NK	NK	NK	NK
Dufftown	St Moluag's Cathedral	57.44078°N 3.12613°W	NK	NK	NK	NK	1011 (1131)	NK	NK	NK	NK	NK	NK	NK	NK	NK	NK
Rosemarkie	Cathedral Church of St Peter	57.59162°N 4.11516°W	NK	NK	NK	NK	1124 (c. 1250)	NK	NK	NK	NK	NK	NK	NK	NK	NK	NK
St Andrews	Church of St Regulus (or St Rule)	56.33965°N 2.786383°W	NK	NK	NK	NK	1070 (c. 1350)	NK	NK	NK	NK	NK	NK	NK	NK	NK	NK
St Andrews Cathedral	NK	56.342138°N 2.791386°W	NK	NK	NK	NK	1350 (1560)	NK	NK	NK	NK	NK	NK	NK	NK	NK	NK
Snizort Cathedral	Church of St Columba	57.4532°N 6.3057°W	NK	NK	NK	NK	c. 1375 (1630)	NK	NK	NK	NK	NK	NK	NK	NK	NK	NK
Elgin	Holy Trinity Cathedral	57.672551°N 3.294929°W	NK	NK	NK	NK	1208 (1224)	NK	NK	NK	NK	NK	NK	NK	NK	NK	NK
Whithorn	The Candida Casa, dedicated to St Martin of Tours	54.733189°N 4.417525°W	NK	NK	NK	NK	c. 450 (c. 825)	NK	NK	NK	NK	NK	NK	NK	NK	NK	NK
Whithorn Priory	Cathedral of St Martin of Tours and St Ninian	54.733500°N 4.417389°W	NK	NK	NK	NK	1130 (1690)	NK	NK	NK	NK	NK	NK	NK	NK	NK	NK
Edinburgh	St Paul's Church	55.956797°N 3.188558°W	Anglican	Scottish Episcopal	NK	NK	c. 1825 (1879)	NK	NK	NK	NK	NK	NK	NK	NK	NK	NK
Dumfries	St Andrew's Cathedral	55.068352°N 3.606584°W	NK	NK	NK	NK	1878 (1961)	NK	NK	NK	NK	NK	NK	NK	NK	NK	NK
Good Shepherd Cathedral, Ayr	Good Shepherd Cathedral, Ayr	55.469842°N 4.599087°W	Catholic	St Andrews and Edinburgh	NK	NK	1957 (2007)	NK	NK	NK	NK	NK	NK	NK	NK	NK	NK
Glasbury	St Peter's Church	52.04297°N 3.20246°W	NK	NK	NK	NK	c. 550 (1055)	NK	NK	NK	NK	NK	NK	NK	NK	NK	NK
Holyhead	St Cybi's Church	53.3114°N 4.6326°W	NK	NK	NK	NK	540 (554)	NK	NK	NK	NK	NK	NK	NK	NK	NK	NK
St Padarn's Church, Llanbadarn Fawr	St Padarn's Church, Llanbadarn Fawr	52.409°N 4.061°W	NK	NK	NK	NK	c. 550 (c. 750)	NK	NK	NK	NK	NK	NK	NK	NK	NK	NK
Llandeilo Fawr	St Teilo's Church	51.88173°N 3.99285°W	NK	NK	NK	NK	c. 550 (c. 1050)	NK	NK	NK	NK	NK	NK	NK	NK	NK	NK
St Asaph	Church of St Kentigern and St Asa	53.25705°N 3.44525°W	NK	NK	NK	NK	c. 550 (c. 1050)	NK	NK	NK	NK	NK	NK	NK	NK	NK	NK
Solihull	St. Mary and Archangel Michael's Coptic Orthodox Cathedral	52.42113574762063, -1.7754150441057102	Coptic Orthodox	West Midlands	NK	NK	NK	NK	NK	NK	NK	NK	NK	NK	NK	NK	NK

== See also ==
- List of Anglican churches in the United Kingdom
- List of Catholic churches in the United Kingdom
- List of cathedrals in England
- List of cathedrals in Northern Ireland
- List of cathedrals in Scotland
- List of cathedrals in Wales
