= St Edmund's Memorial, Hoxne =

Memorial to St Edmund in Hoxne, Suffolk, England

Coordinates: 52.344827°N 1.203536°E

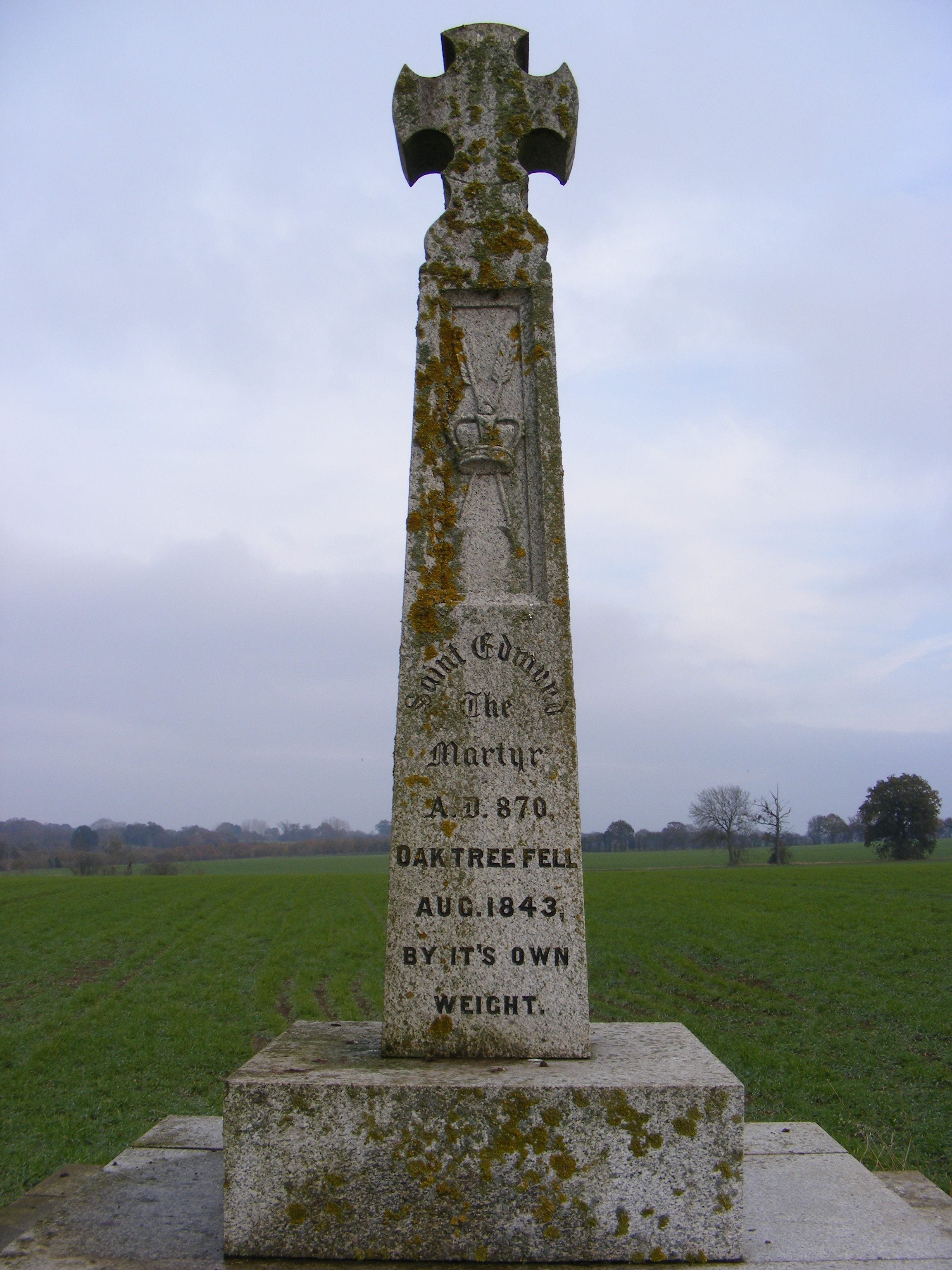
St Edmund's Memorial, Hoxne: Both the month and the year of the collapse of the tree are wrong

St Edmund's Memorial, Hoxne is a memorial which claims to mark the spot where St Edmund was killed by the Vikings in the Suffolk village of Hoxne. The monument is a Grade II listed building located in a field 95m east of Abbey Hill. The monument refers to an oak tree which fell under its own weight in the mid nineteenth century. Hoxne has traditionally been seen as the site of Haegelisdun where Edmund was recorded to have died and buried before he was translated to Beodricesworth monastery in modern day Bury St Edmunds, although this view is now disputed.

== The legend ==
Edmund was King of East Anglia and in 865 faced an invasion by a Viking force known as the Great Heathen Army. The Anglo-Saxon Chronicle simply notes that King Edmund fought the Vikings while they wintered at Thetford in 869 and was defeated and killed. However subsequent documentation offers greater detail and contributed to the medieval Cult of St Edmund. In the 10th century Abbo of Fleury wrote the Passio Sancti Eadmundi, which the local legend to some extent matches. According to Abbo, Edmund chose not to fight the Vikings, but rather chose the role of a martyr.

== The oak ==
An oak, considered by many to be a 'Royal Oak' with associations to King Edmund, collapsed in September 1848. Sir Edward Kerrison, 1st Baronet, the then owner of Hoxne Hall, on whose land the oak stood, informed the Bury and West Suffolk Archaeological Institute of the event, relating how an arrowhead found in the tree had been exhibited by his son-in-law Lord Mahon at the Society of Antiquaries, of which Mahon was president.

"King Edmund's Oak fell on the 11th September, 1848, apparently in the vigour of health; but the foliage this year was probably beyond the weight of the trunk to support. The trunk was shivered in the middle, and was 20feet in circumference. The tree contained 17 loads of timber; the branches being the size of ordinary oaks, and spread over 28 yards in width. An enquiry from Bury being made respecting the arrows, search was immediately made in the truffle, about a man's height from the ground, when, in a sound piece of wood, an arrowhead or spike was found, covered a little more than a foot thick with sound material, the rest of the trunk being warted nearly two feet quite through the inside, and perfectly decayed, as saw dust. The annual ring, or layer, of this magnificent tree, is considered by competent judges to shew the growth of more than a thousand years. In Hoxne church there is still a poppy-head of a pew, with King Edmund's head, surrounded by a crown, supported by wolves' paws."

== The monument ==
The current monument is not the original monument, which collapsed during a storm on 27 June 1905. It was rebuilt by Agnes Burrell Bateman-Hanbury, the daughter of Sir Edward Kerrison, 1st Baronet. She had inherited Oakley Park, as Hoxne manor was then known following the death of her brother Sir Edward Kerrison, 2nd Baronet who had died in 1886. Faulty instructions given to Richard F. Perfitt, a stone mason based in Diss, led to errors in the inscription.

== Sources ==
- Young, Francis (2018). Edmund: In Search of England's Lost King. London: Bloomsbury. ISBN 978-17867-3-361-0.
