= Thomas Brunce =

English Bishop (1388–1445)

- Bishop of Norwich
- Appointed: 19 September 1437
- Term ended: 6 December 1445
- Predecessor: William Alnwick
- Successor: Walter Hart
- Other posts: Bishop of Rochester (1435–1437); Bishop of Worcester-elect (1433); Dean of Salisbury (1431–1435); Bishop of Chichester-elect (1429)

Orders
- Consecration: 1 May 1435

Personal details
- Born: c. 1388
- Died: 6 December 1445 Hoxne, Suffolk
- Denomination: Roman Catholic
- Parents: William Brunce
- Education: Oxford University (possibly New College)

Thomas Brunce (Note: Sometimes Brouns, or incorrectly Brown) (c. 1388 – 6 December 1445) was a 15th-century Bishop of Rochester and then Bishop of Norwich.

== Life ==
Brunce was the son of William Brunce of Brunce's Court in Sutton Courtenay in Berkshire (now Oxfordshire). He studied at Oxford, possibly at New College, where he became friends with Thomas Beckington (later Bishop of Bath and Wells).

Brunce entered the Church and held a number of posts in Lincolnshire, being collated Archdeacon of Stow in 1419. He also undertook diplomatic missions on the Continent for King Henry V. In 1427 he was collated Archdeacon of Berkshire and in 1429 was elected Bishop of Chichester, although the latter position was given to Simon Sydenham instead. He was Dean of Salisbury (since 1431) when, Pope Eugene IV wanted to make him Bishop of Worcester on 24 September 1433, but King Henry VI of England had other ideas and he was made Bishop of Rochester instead on 21 February 1435.

Brunce was consecrated on 1 May 1435. On 19 September 1437, he was transferred to the see of Norwich, where he is remembered for upholding the rights of the Cathedral over the townsfolk and for erecting the great rood loft. He died on 6 December 1445 at the Episcopal manor of Hoxne in Suffolk.

Executors of Thomas Brouns, former bishop of Norwich, are listed in 1460 as litigants in the Court of Common Pleas.

== Citations ==
Catholic Church titles
Preceded by John Rickingale	Bishop of Chichester; 1429	Succeeded by Simon Sydenham
Preceded by Thomas Polton	Bishop of Worcester; 1433–1435	Succeeded by Thomas Bourchier
Preceded by John Langdon	Bishop of Rochester; 1435–1437	Succeeded by William Wells
Preceded by William Alnwick	Bishop of Norwich; 1437–1445	Succeeded by Walter Hart
