= The Rose of Rouen =

The Rose of Rouen is a 15th-century carol, written after the Battle of Towton in 1461, eulogising the Yorkist leader Edward, Earl of March, who was soon to become King Edward IV.

== Historical context ==
Before the Battle of Towton took place on 29 March 1461, Queen Margaret, wife of King Henry VI, led the Lancastrian army south, fresh from victory over the Yorkists at the Battle of Wakefield.

== Etymology ==
Now is the rose of Rone growen to a gret honoure, Therefore syng we euerychone, "I-blessid be that floure!"

— The Rose of Rouen, lines 66-67.

The title of the poem reflects its subject. King Edward, son of Richard, Duke of York, had been born in Rouen, France, in 1442, while his father was on campaign. He was, as a young man, described by contemporaries as taller than average, extremely fit and handsome. His cognizance was a rose en soleil, and so was nick-named the Rose of Rouen. This also reinforced his noble parenting as his mother, Cecilly Neville, in praise of her beauty, was called "The Rose of Raby," after the castle of her birth. Edward's connection with the rose continued into his reign, and coins known as "rose nobles" were issued. Edward's birthplace was an important factor in his favour when he was elected king in 1461, as it was thought an omen that Normandy—only recently lost to France in the Hundred Years' War—would be returned to the English.

== Creation ==
The poem is one of many politically orientated pieces from the period, (Note: Others included the Libelle of Englyshe Polycye (from 1436), The Ship of State, and The Court of Sapience.) and plays heavily on the North—South divide. The army that Margaret brings to the gates of London was Northern. Yorkist propaganda heavily emphasised its barbaric nature, particularly fuelling rumours that the Lancastrians were sacking towns as it marched deeper south. The rumours had fertile soil: because, historian Margaret Cron has said, "fear of barbarians from the North was a race memory in Southern minds." The Rose of Rouen was written on the premise that not only would Northern lords over-run the South, but more, that "they would then live in it and take what they needed including wives and daughters." This is the fate, says the poem, that Edward of York saved England from.

== Text ==
Like other political poetry of the period, it is careful to identify its protagonists by their cognizances rather than naming them: Edward, of course, is a white rose, his father Richard of York, Duke of York, is a falcon and fetterlock, Richard Neville, Earl of Warwick a ragged staff, his uncle William Neville, Lord Fauconberg a fish hook, and John Mowbray, Duke of Norfolk by a white lion.

The Rose of Rouen's style has been described as one of "confident Yorkist triumphalism" as it concentrates on the success of Edward's strategy, from the original London muster to Edward's increasing popularity as he marched north (in which, of course, he swelled his army even more). Hence the long list of nobles (and their heraldic symbols) that the poem presents is another aspect of the propaganda, as historically, at Towton, the Queen had the bulk of the English nobility in the Lancastrian army; Edward, on the other hand, had only the Duke of Norfolk, the Earls of Warwick and Arundel, and Lord Fauconberg with him.

=== Heraldic identification of the nobility ===
Image	Description	Individual	Notes
	"The Rose"	Edward, Earl of March, later Edward IV	"...and when he saw the time best The Rose from London went"
	"The Ragged staff"	Richard Neville, 16th Earl of Warwick	"...with him went the Ragged Staff that many men brought"
	"The White Lion"	John Mowbray, 3rd Duke of Norfolk	"...So did the White Lion full worthy he wrought"
	"The Fish Hook"	William Neville, Lord Fauconberg	"...The Fish Hook came to the field in full eager mood"
	"The Cornish Chough"	John Scrope, 5th Baron Scrope of Bolton	"...So did the Cornish Chough and brought forth all her brood"
	"The Black Ragged staff"	Edmund Grey, Lord Ruthin	"...There was the Black Ragged Staff that is both true and good"
	"The Bridled Horse"	Sir William Herbert	"...The Bridled Horse, the Water Boughet, by the Horse stood"
	"The Water Boughet"	Henry, Viscount Bourchier	"...The Bridled Horse, the Water Boughet, by the Horse stood"
	"The Horse"	William FitzAlan, 16th Earl of Arundel	"...The Bridled Horse, the Water Boughet, by the Horse stood"
	"The Greyhound"	Sir Walter Devereux	"...The Greyhound, the Hart's Head they quit them well that day"
	"The Hart's Head"	Thomas, Lord Stanley	"...The Greyhound, the Hart's Head they quit them well that day"
	"The Harrow of Canterbury and Clinton"	John Clinton, 5th Baron Clinton	"...So did the Harrow of Canterbury and Clinton"
	"The Falcon and Fetterlock"	Edward of York (as Duke of York)	"...The Falcon and Fetterlock was there that tide"
	"The Black Bull"	Sir William Hastings	"...The Black Bull also himself would not hide"
	"The Dolphin"	John Tuchet, 6th Baron Audley	"...The Dolphin came from Wales"
	"Three Corbies"	Sir Roger Corbie	"...Three Corbies by his side"
