= List of cathedrals in England =

This list of cathedrals in England includes the Isle of Man, Guernsey, Jersey, and Gibraltar. Former and intended cathedrals are listed separately. Cathedrals in overseas territories can be found at List of cathedrals in British Overseas Territories.

A cathedral church is a Christian place of worship that is the chief, or "mother" church of a diocese and is distinguished as such by being the location for the cathedra or bishop's seat. In the strictest sense, only those Christian denominations with an episcopal hierarchy possess cathedrals. However, notable churches that were formerly part of an episcopal denomination are still often informally called cathedrals.

It is a common misconception that the term "cathedral" may be applied to any particularly large or grand church. A cathedral may be a relatively small building, particularly if it is located in a sparser or poorer community. Modern cathedrals frequently lack the grandeur of those of the Medieval and Renaissance times, focusing more on the functional aspect of a place of worship. However, many of the grand and ancient cathedrals that remain today were originally built to much smaller plans, and have been successively extended and rebuilt over the centuries.

Some cathedrals were purpose-built as such. Some were formerly abbeys or priories, whilst others were parochial, or parish churches, subsequently promoted in status due to ecclesiastical requirements such as periodic diocesan reorganisation.

For the other parts of the United Kingdom, see List of cathedrals in Northern Ireland; List of cathedrals in Scotland; List of cathedrals in Wales

For the Falkland Islands, which has a similar constitutional status to Gibraltar, see Christ Church Cathedral (Falkland Islands)

== Contents of this list ==
The following list comprises all locations of current cathedral churches, or former cathedral churches, including those locations where no trace remains of the structure, indeed where the precise location is no longer known.

Also included are those structures or sites of intended cathedrals as well as pro-cathedrals, which are churches serving as an interim cathedral, (for instance whilst a permanent cathedral is acquired), or as a co-cathedral where the diocesan demographics/geography require the bishop's seat to be shared with a building in another location.

The inclusion of dependencies is strictly for ecclesiastical reasons—the included dependencies are those that share a province with the mainland of England.

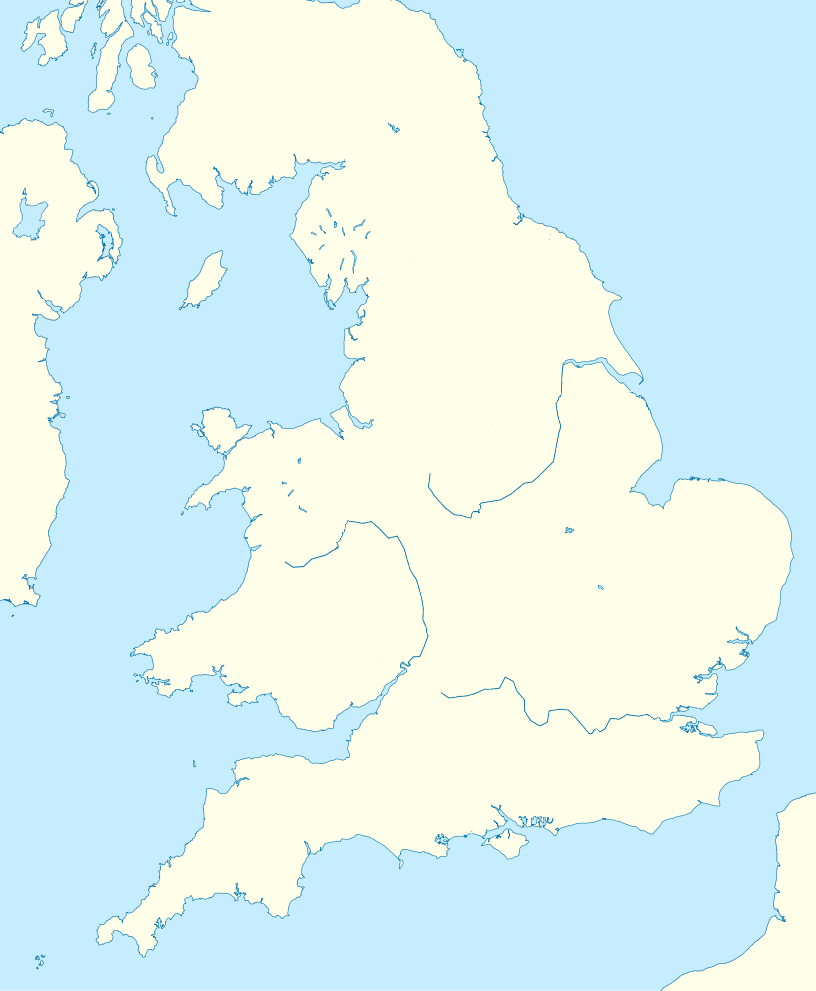
- - Cathedrals of the Church of England:
  - Province of Canterbury
  - Province of York
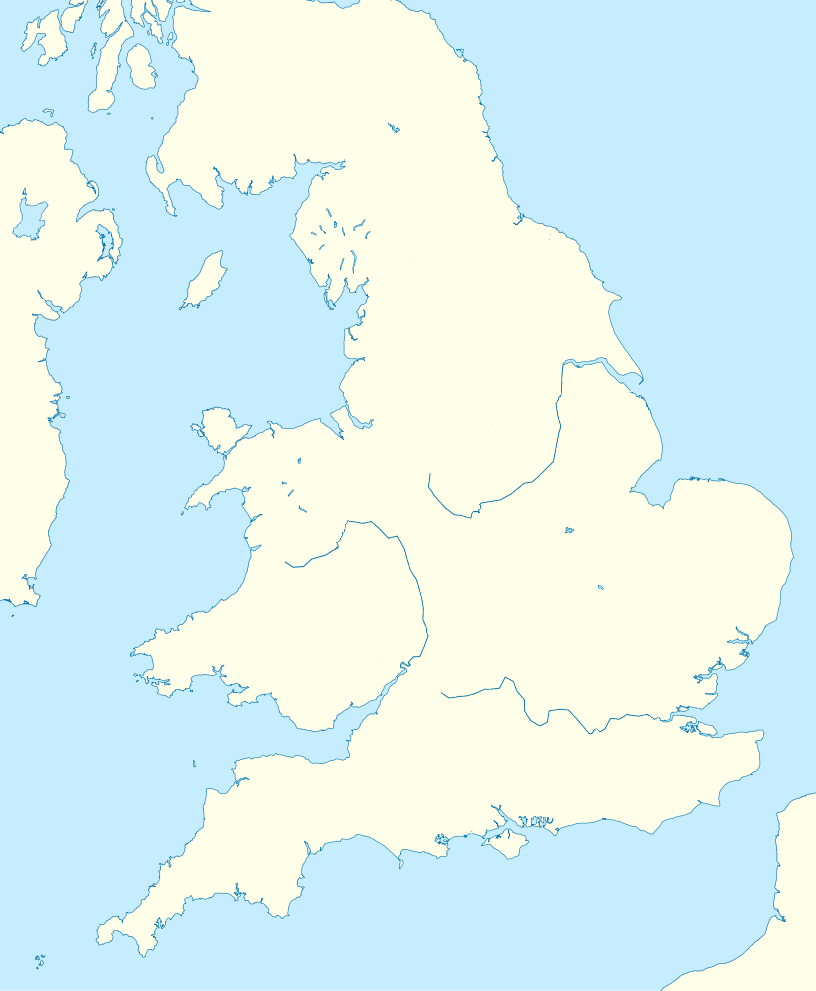
- - Cathedrals of the Catholic Church in England:
  - Archdiocese of Liverpool
  - Archdiocese of Westminster
  - Archdiocese of Birmingham
  - Archdiocese of Southwark
  - Bishopric of the Forces

== Church of England ==
=== Province of Canterbury ===
Image	Name and dedication	Diocese	Established, location
	Birmingham Cathedral; Cathedral Church of St Philip	Diocese of Birmingham	1905
	former parish church		52°28′52″N 1°53′56″W
	Bristol Cathedral; Cathedral Church of the Holy and Undivided Trinity	Diocese of Bristol	1542–1836; 1897
	Augustinian abbey 1140–1539		51°27′06″N 2°36′03″W
	Canterbury Cathedral; Cathedral and Metropolitical Church of Christ	Diocese of Canterbury	597
	Mother church of the Province of Canterbury and of the Anglican Communion worldwide		51°16′47″N 1°04′59″E
	Chelmsford Cathedral; Cathedral Church of St Mary, St Peter and St Cedd	Diocese of Chelmsford	1914
	former parish church		51°44′07″N 0°28′20″E
	Chichester Cathedral; Cathedral Church of the Holy Trinity	Diocese of Chichester	1080
	founded when bishop's seat moved from Selsey		50°50′11″N 0°46′50″W
	Coventry Cathedral; Cathedral Church of St Michael	Diocese of Coventry	1962
	replaced the cathedral (parish church till 1918) lost during World War II		52°24′31″N 1°30′25″W
	Derby Cathedral; Cathedral Church of All Saints	Diocese of Derby	1927
	former parish church		52°55′29″N 1°28′39″W
	Ely Cathedral; Cathedral Church of the Holy and Undivided Trinity	Diocese of Ely	1109
	convent (with monastery?) 673–9th century secular canons 9th century; Benedictine priory 970–1540 formerly dedicated to St Peter and St Etheldreda		52°23′55″N 0°15′48″E
	Exeter Cathedral; Cathedral Church of St Peter	Diocese of Exeter	1050
	translated from Crediton		50°43′21″N 3°31′47″W
	Gibraltar Cathedral; Cathedral Church of the Holy Trinity	Diocese in Europe	1842
	church built between 1825 and 1832		
	Gloucester Cathedral; Cathedral Church of St Peter and the Holy and Indivisible Trinity	Diocese of Gloucester	1541
	joint with Bristol Cathedral 1836–1897 monastery and convent 681; secular canons 823; Benedictine priory 1022–1539 formerly dedicated to St Peter		51°52′03″N 2°14′48″W
	Guildford Cathedral; Cathedral Church of the Holy Spirit	Diocese of Guildford	1965
			51°14′28″N 0°35′24″W
	Hereford Cathedral; Cathedral Church of St Mary the Virgin and St Ethelbert	Diocese of Hereford	676
			52°03′15″N 2°42′58″W
	Leicester Cathedral; Cathedral Church of St Martin	Diocese of Leicester	1927
	former parish church		52°38′05″N 1°08′13″W
	Lichfield Cathedral; Cathedral Church of the Blessed Virgin Mary and St Chad	Diocese of Lichfield	669–803, 1048
	archbishopric 785–803 see moved to Chester 1075 joint with Coventry 1048–1826; The three spires known as The Ladies of the Vale		52°41′08″N 1°49′49″W
	Lincoln Cathedral; Cathedral Church of St Mary	Diocese of Lincoln	1070
	joint with Dorchester, Oxon c.954–1072 translated from Dorchester 1072		53°14′04″N 0°32′11″W
	Norwich Cathedral; Cathedral Church of the Holy and Undivided Trinity	Diocese of Norwich	1094
	translated from Thetford; Benedictine priory 1096–1539		52°37′54″N 1°18′02″E
	Oxford Cathedral; The Cathedral Church of Christ, Oxford (Christ Church, University of Oxford)	Diocese of Oxford	1542
	translated from Osney 1546 convent 727 secular canons 1004; Augustinian priory 1122–1524 formerly dedicated to St Frideswide		51°45′03″N 1°15′16″W
	Peterborough Cathedral; Cathedral Church of St Peter, St Paul and St Andrew	Diocese of Peterborough	1541
	abbey 655 church 1238–1539		52°34′20″N 0°14′18″W
	Portsmouth Cathedral; Cathedral Church of St Thomas of Canterbury	Diocese of Portsmouth	1927
	former parish church		50°47′26″N 1°06′15″W
	Rochester Cathedral; Cathedral Church of Christ and the Blessed Virgin Mary	Diocese of Rochester	604
	secular canons 604–1080; Benedictine priory 1080–1540 formerly dedicated to St Andrew		51°23′20″N 0°30′12″E
	St Albans Cathedral; Cathedral and Abbey Church of St Alban	Diocese of St Albans	1877
	Benedictine abbey 976–1539		51°45′02″N 0°20′34″W
	St Edmundsbury Cathedral; Cathedral Church of St James and St Edmund	Diocese of St Edmundsbury and Ipswich	1914
	former parish church		52°14′38″N 0°43′01″E
	St Paul's Cathedral; Cathedral Church of St Paul	Diocese of London	1675
	replaced previous cathedral 604–1666 (destroyed in Great Fire of London)		51°30′50″N 0°05′54″W
	Salisbury Cathedral; Cathedral Church of the Blessed Virgin Mary	Diocese of Salisbury	1227
	translated from Old Sarum		51°03′53″N 1°47′51″W
	Southwark Cathedral; Cathedral and Collegiate Church of St Saviour and St Mary Overie	Diocese of Southwark	1905
	Augustinian priory 1106–1539		51°30′22″N 0°05′23″W
	Truro Cathedral; Cathedral Church of St Mary	Diocese of Truro	1880
	incorporates former parish church		50°15′51″N 5°03′04″W
	Wells Cathedral; Cathedral Church of St Andrew	Diocese of Bath and Wells	1239
			51°12′37″N 2°38′38″W
	Winchester Cathedral; Cathedral Church of the Holy Trinity, St Peter, St Paul and St Swithun	Diocese of Winchester	650
	secular canons to 964; Benedictine priory 964–1539		51°03′36″N 1°18′44″W
	Worcester Cathedral; Cathedral Church of Christ and the Blessed Virgin Mary	Diocese of Worcester	743
	Benedictine priory 969–1540		52°11′19″N 2°13′15″W

=== Province of York ===
Image	Name and dedication	Diocese	Established, location
	Blackburn Cathedral; Cathedral Church of St Mary the Virgin with St Paul	Diocese of Blackburn	1926
	former parish church		53°44′50″N 2°28′53″W
	Bradford Cathedral; Cathedral Church of St Peter	Diocese of Leeds; Diocese of Bradford (1919–2014)	1919
	former parish church		53°47′43″N 1°44′52″W
	Carlisle Cathedral; Cathedral Church of the Holy and Undivided Trinity	Diocese of Carlisle	1113
	secular canons to 1092 Augustinian priory 1123–1540		54°53′41″N 2°56′19″W
	Chester Cathedral; Cathedral Church of Christ and the Blessed Virgin Mary	Diocese of Chester	1541
	convent? to 875 secular canons from 907; Benedictine abbey 1093–1540 originally dedicated to St Peter and St Paul, then to St Werburgh		53°11′31″N 2°53′25″W
	Durham Cathedral; Cathedral Church of Christ, the Blessed Virgin Mary and St Cuthbert	Diocese of Durham	997
	secular canons 997 Benedictine priory 1093–1540 originally dedicated to St Mary and St Cuthbert		54°46′23″N 1°34′36″W
	Liverpool Cathedral; Cathedral Church of Christ	Diocese of Liverpool	1904
			53°23′51″N 2°58′24″W
	Manchester Cathedral; Cathedral and Collegiate Church of St Mary, St Denys and St George	Diocese of Manchester	1847
	former collegiate parish church (1421)		53°29′06″N 2°14′40″W
	Newcastle Cathedral; Cathedral Church of St Nicholas	Diocese of Newcastle	1882
	former parish church		54°58′12″N 1°36′40″W
	Peel Cathedral; Cathedral Church of St German	Diocese of Sodor and Man	1980
	former Parish Church, built between 1879 and 1884, spire removed 1907 became cathedral in 1980 after several attempts to restore the ruined cathedral on St Patrick's Isle came to no avail although the diocese is in the Province of York, the Isle of Man is not part of the United Kingdom		54°13′31″N 4°42′00″W
	Ripon Cathedral; Cathedral Church of St Peter and St Wilfrid	Diocese of Leeds; Diocese of Ripon (1836–2014; "Ripon and Leeds", 1999–2014)	1836
	monastery pre-660 later collegiate with secular canons (10th century?)		54°08′06″N 1°31′13″W
	Sheffield Cathedral; Cathedral Church of St Peter and St Paul	Diocese of Sheffield	1914
	former parish church		53°22′59″N 1°28′09″W
	Southwell Minster; Cathedral and Parish Church of the Blessed Virgin Mary	Diocese of Southwell and Nottingham	1884
	collegiate with secular canons to 1840		53°04′36″N 0°57′15″W
	Wakefield Cathedral; Cathedral Church of All Saints	Diocese of Leeds; Diocese of Wakefield (1888–2014)	1888
	former parish church		53°40′59″N 1°29′48″W
	York Minster; Cathedral and Metropolitical Church of St Peter	Diocese of York	627
	Mother church of the Province of York		53°57′45″N 1°04′55″W

== Catholic Church ==
=== Latin Church ===
==== Province of Westminster ====
Image	Name and dedication	Diocese	Established, location
	Brentwood Cathedral; Cathedral Church of St Mary and St Helen	Diocese of Brentwood	1917
	parish church 1861		51°37′11″N 0°18′24″E
	Norwich Cathedral; Cathedral Church of St John the Baptist	Diocese of East Anglia	1976
			52°37′45″N 1°17′02″E
	Northampton Cathedral; Cathedral Church of Our Lady and St Thomas of Canterbury	Diocese of Northampton	1850
	formerly the parish church of St Felix		52°14′53″N 0°53′55″W
	Nottingham Cathedral; Cathedral Church of St Barnabas	Diocese of Nottingham	1850
			52°57′17″N 1°09′26″W
	Westminster Cathedral; Cathedral Church of the Most Holy Blood, St Mary, St Joseph and St Peter	Archdiocese of Westminster	1910
	Mother church of the Province of Westminster		51°29′45″N 0°08′23″W

==== Province of Birmingham ====
Image	Name and dedication	Diocese	Established, location
	Birmingham Cathedral; Cathedral and Metropolitical Church of St Chad	Archdiocese of Birmingham	1839
	Mother church of the Province of Birmingham pro-cathedral 1839–1841		52°29′08″N 1°53′55″W
	Clifton Cathedral; Cathedral Church of St Peter and St Paul	Diocese of Clifton	1973
	preceded by The Pro-Cathedral of the Apostles		51°27′35″N 2°36′59″W
	Shrewsbury Cathedral; Cathedral Church of Our Lady Help of Christians and St Peter Alcantara	Diocese of Shrewsbury	1850
			52°42′19″N 2°45′14″W

==== Province of Liverpool ====
Image	Name and dedication	Diocese	Established, location
	Lancaster Cathedral; Cathedral Church of St Peter	Diocese of Lancaster	1924
			54°02′49″N 2°47′38″W
	Leeds Cathedral; Cathedral Church of St Anne	Diocese of Leeds	1878
	rebuilt 1904 after original site used for road-widening		53°48′02″N 1°32′49″W
	Liverpool Metropolitan Cathedral; Cathedral and Metropolitical Church of Christ the King	Archdiocese of Liverpool	1967
	preceded by two earlier unfinished cathedrals		53°24′17″N 2°58′06″W
	Middlesbrough Cathedral; Cathedral Church of St Mary	Diocese of Middlesbrough	1983
	translated to Coulby Newham from Middlesbrough town centre		54°31′22″N 1°12′49″W
	Newcastle Cathedral; Cathedral Church of St Mary	Diocese of Hexham and Newcastle	1882
			54°58′09″N 1°37′09″W
	Salford Cathedral; Cathedral Church of St John the Evangelist	Diocese of Salford	1850
			53°29′01″N 2°15′40″W
	Sheffield Cathedral; Cathedral Church of St Marie	Diocese of Hallam	1980
			53°22′53″N 1°28′05″W

==== Province of Southwark ====
Image	Name and dedication	Diocese	Established, Location
	Arundel Cathedral; Cathedral Church of Our Lady and St Philip Howard	Diocese of Arundel and Brighton	1965
	formerly (to 1971) dedicated to Our Lady and St Philip Neri		50°51′19″N 0°33′33″W
	Plymouth Cathedral; Cathedral Church of St Mary and St Boniface	Diocese of Plymouth	1858
			50°22′25″N 4°09′06″W
	Portsmouth Cathedral; Cathedral Church of St John the Evangelist	Diocese of Portsmouth	1882
			50°48′01″N 1°05′38″W
	Southwark Cathedral; Cathedral and Metropolitical Church of St George	Archdiocese of Southwark	1850
	Mother church of the Province of Southwark		51°29′52″N 0°06′28″W

==== Bishopric of the Forces ====
Image	Name and dedication	Diocese	Established, location
	Aldershot Cathedral; Cathedral Church of St Michael and St George	Bishopric of the Forces	1972
	Cathedral built by Sir Robert Lorimer 1892/3 initially for the Anglican chaplaincies of the British Army		51°15′36″N 0°45′36″W

==== Diocese of Gibraltar ====
Image	Name and dedication	Diocese	Established, location
	Gibraltar Cathedral; Cathedral of St. Mary the Crowned	Diocese of Gibraltar	1462
			36°08′23″N 5°21′13″W

==== Personal Ordinariate of Our Lady of Walsingham ====
N.B. The Personal Ordinariate of Our Lady of Walsingham, a diocese-like structure under canon law, is currently headed by a married man, who is therefore an ordinary but not a bishop; hence the central church of the Ordinariate is not technically a cathedral. However, it will be a cathedral whenever the ordinary is a bishop. It is therefore included here. The Cathedral of Our Lady of Walsingham (Houston) is in the same position.

Image	Name and dedication	Ordinariate	Established, location
	The central church of the Ordinariate of our Lady of Walsingham; Church of Our Lady of the Assumption and St Gregory	Personal Ordinariate of Our Lady of Walsingham	2013 as the central church of the Ordinariate; 1928 as a parish church.
			51°30′40″N 0°08′17″W

=== Ukrainian Greek Catholic Church ===
==== Eparchy of the Holy Family of London ====
Image	Name and dedication	Diocese	Established, location
	London Cathedral; Cathedral Church of the Holy Family in Exile	Eparchy of Holy Family of London	1968
	former Congregational church (the "King's Weigh House" Congregational Church)		51°30′48″N 0°09′02″W

=== Syro-Malabar Catholic Church ===
==== Eparchy of Great Britain ====
Image	Name and dedication	Diocese	Established, location
	Syro-Malabar Cathedral of St. Alphonsa, Preston; Cathedral Church of St Alphonsa	Eparchy of Great Britain	2016
	formerly St Ignatius' Church		53°45′49″N 2°41′48″W

== Eastern and Oriental Orthodox Churches ==
=== Antiochian Orthodox Church ===
Image	Name and dedication	Diocese	Established, location
	London Cathedral; Cathedral Church of St George	Diocese of Western Europe	1989
	Kensington Square		

=== Coptic Orthodox Church ===
Image	Name and dedication	Diocese	Established, location
	St. George's Cathedral, Stevenage; Cathedral Church of St George	Diocese of London	2002
			51°53′11″N 0°10′48″W
Image	Name and dedication	Diocese	Established, location
	St. Mary & Archangel Michael's Cathedral, Solihull; St. Mary & Archangel Michael Coptic Orthodox Cathedral	Diocese of the Midlands	2015
			52°25′16″N 1°46′31″W

=== Greek Orthodox Church ===
Image	Name and dedication	Diocese	Established, location
	St Andrew's Cathedral, Birmingham; Cathedral Church of the Dormition of the Mother of God and St Andrew	Archdiocese of Thyateira and Great Britain	
	8 Arthur Place, Summerhill, B1 3DA former Church of England parish church		52°28′58″N 1°54′51″W
	Leicester Orthodox Cathedral; Cathedral Church of St Nicholas and St Xenophon	Archdiocese of Thyateira and Great Britain	
	Aylestone Road, Leicester, LE2 7NW former Church of England parish church of All Souls		52°37′22″N 1°08′08″W
	Camden Town Cathedral; Cathedral Church of All Saints	Archdiocese of Thyateira and Great Britain	1991
	Camden Town, NW1 0JA former Church of England parish church		51°32′20″N 0°08′16″W
	London Orthodox Cathedral; Cathedral and Metropolitical Church of St Sophia	Archdiocese of Thyateira and Great Britain	1922
	Westminster, W2 4LQ consecrated 5 January 1882, mother church of the Greek Orthodox church in Great Britain		51°30′45″N 0°11′29″W
	London Orthodox Cathedral; Cathedral Church of the Dormition of the Mother of God	Archdiocese of Thyateira and Great Britain	
	Wood Green, N22 8LB		51°36′04″N 0°06′53″W
	London Orthodox Cathedral; Cathedral Church of the Nativity of the Mother of God	Archdiocese of Thyateira and Great Britain	
	Camberwell, SE5 0TF		51°28′31″N 0°05′41″W
	London Cathedral; Cathedral Church of St Andrew	Archdiocese of Thyateira and Great Britain	1970
	Kentish Town, NW1 9QA		51°32′44″N 0°08′29″W
	London Orthodox Cathedral; Cathedral Church of St Nicholas	Archdiocese of Thyateira and Great Britain	
	Shepherds Bush, W12 8JW		51°30′15″N 0°13′59″W
	London Orthodox Cathedral; Cathedral Church of the Holy Cross and St Michael	Archdiocese of Thyateira and Great Britain	
	Golders Green, NW11 8DA		51°34′26″N 0°12′06″W

=== Russian Orthodox Church ===
Image	Name and dedication	Diocese	Established, location
	London Orthodox Cathedral SW7; Cathedral Church of the Dormition and All Saints	Diocese of Sourozh	
	Ennismore Gardens, SW7 1NH		51°30′02″N 0°10′09″W
	London Orthodox Cathedral W4; Cathedral of the Dormition of the Most Holy Mother of God and Holy Royal Martyrs	Diocese of Great Britain and Ireland (ROCOR)	1999
	57 Harvard Road, Hounslow, W4 4ED		51°29′23″N 0°16′34″W

=== Syriac Orthodox Church ===
Image	Name and dedication	Diocese	Established, location
	St Thomas' Cathedral, East Acton; Cathedral Church of Saint Thomas		2012
	7 Armstrong Road, London W3 7JL		51°30′30″N 0°14′47″W

=== Ukrainian Autocephalous Orthodox Church ===
Image	Name and dedication	Diocese	Established, location
	London Cathedral W3; Ukrainian Autocephalous Orthodox Cathedral of the Holy Transfiguration of our Saviour		
	1a Newton Avenue, London, W3 8AJ		51°30′15″N 0°16′07″W

=== Georgian Orthodox Church ===
Image	Name and dedication	Diocese	Established, location
	Stamford Hill Cathedral, London N16: from 2011 onwards, the Georgian Orthodox Cathedral Church of the Nativity of Our Lord; Previous name (1956–2007): Cathedral of the Good Shepherd. Original name: Church of the Ark of the Covenant, or Abode of Love.		
	Rookwood Road, Stamford Hill, London N16 6SS Built originally (1892–1895) as "Church of the Ark of the Covenant" for the Agapemonites (the Abode of Love) but probably not actively used by them after the 1920s. Used (1956 to 2007) by the "Ancient Catholic Church of the Good Shepherd" and known during this period as "Cathedral of the Good Shepherd"		51°34′24″N 0°04′00″W

== Other churches ==
=== Anglican Catholic Church ===
Image	Name and dedication	Diocese	Established, location
	Pro-Cathedral Church of St Augustine of Canterbury	Diocese of the United Kingdom	2008
	Eastling Road, Painters Forstal, Kent ME13 0DU		51°17′39″N 0°51′24″E

=== Holy Catholic Church (Western Rite) ===
Image	Name and dedication	Diocese	Established, location
	Our Lady of Grace Cathedral, Stoke-on-Trent; Cathedral Church of Our Lady of Grace		
	Newport Lane, Stoke-on-Trent, ST6 3NA former Methodist church, translated from Madeley Heath		53°02′20″N 2°12′15″W

Liberal Catholic Church is term that covers groups within the Independent Catholicism movement.

Image	Name and dedication	Diocese	Established, location
	Putney Cathedral; Pro-Cathedral Church of All Saints		
	pro-cathedral		51°27′41″N 0°13′13″W

=== Traditional Anglican Church in England ===
Image	Name and dedication	Diocese	Established, location
	St. Gilbert's Cathedral 107-115 Newark Road. Lincoln, LN5 8NQ		

== See also ==
- Lists of cathedrals – lists by country
- List of cathedrals in Ireland
- List of cathedrals in Scotland
- List of cathedrals in Wales
- List of abbeys and priories in the United Kingdom
- List of abbeys and priories in the Republic of Ireland
- List of tallest church buildings
- Architecture of the medieval cathedrals of England
- Religion in the United Kingdom
- Parish Church of St Helier (Pro-Cathedral of the Channel Islands)
- List of former cathedrals in Great Britain
- Minster
