= William Wells (bishop) =

15th-century Bishop of Rochester

- Bishop of Rochester
- Appointed: 19 September 1436
- Term ended: February 1444
- Predecessor: Thomas Brunce
- Successor: John Low

Orders
- Consecration: 24 March 1437

Personal details
- Died: February 1444
- Denomination: Catholic

William Wells was a medieval abbot of St. Mary's Abbey, York and Bishop of Rochester.

Wells was elected to the abbacy of St. Mary's in 1423, succeeding Thomas Spofford. He resigned in 1436. Wells was nominated as Bishop of Rochester on 19 September 1436 and consecrated on 24 March 1437. He died between 8 February and 25 February 1444.

== Citations ==
Catholic Church titles
Preceded by Thomas Brunce	Bishop of Rochester; 1436–1444	Succeeded by John Low
