= John Low (bishop) =

15th-century Bishop of Rochester and Bishop of St Asaph

- Bishop of Rochester
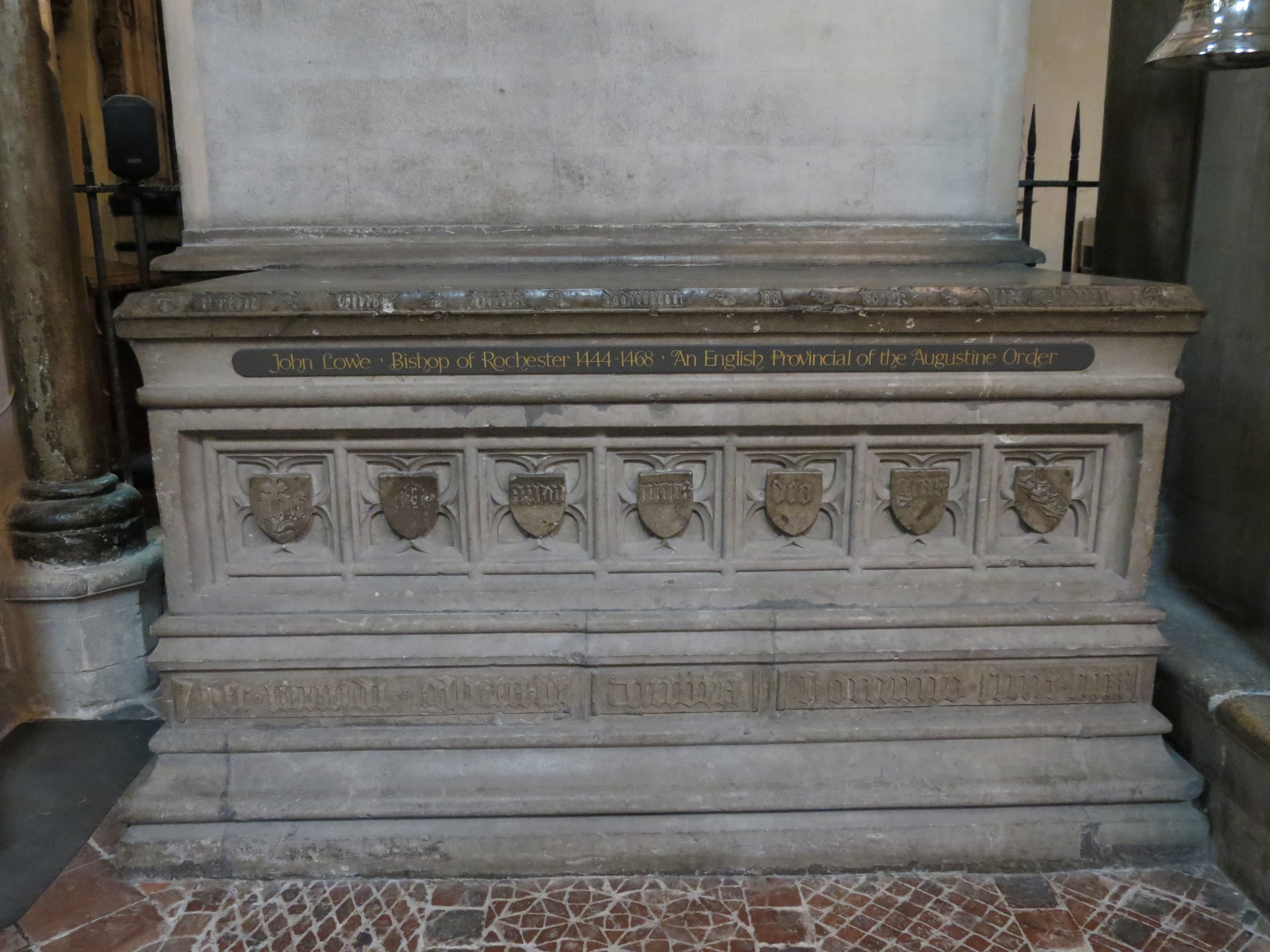
- Appointed: 22 April 1444
- Term ended: November 1467
- Predecessor: William Wells
- Successor: Thomas Rotherham
- Previous post: Bishop of St Asaph

Orders
- Consecration: 1 November 1433

Personal details
- Died: November 1467
- Denomination: Catholic

John Low or John Lowe (c. 1382–1467) was a medieval Bishop of St Asaph and then Bishop of Rochester, in Wales and England respectively. He was an Augustinian friar and opponent of the Lollard movement.

He was born in Worcestershire, descended from Henry and Isabella Lowe of Lindridge, Worcestershire, who lived in the reign of King Richard II. He became an Augustinian hermit, and studied at Droitwich. He studied at Lincoln where he was ordained a deacon on 20 December 1403. He was created a Doctor at Oxford before coming to the Augustine House in London in 1420. He was provincial of England for the Augustinian order from 1427 to 1433.

About 1432 he was confessor to King Henry VI. He was created Bishop of St. Asaph, Wales, by a papal bull dated 17 August 1433, being consecrated on 1 November 1433. He assisted in the foundation of Eton College in 1442 and King's College, Cambridge in 1444.

He was translated to the see of Rochester on 26 October 1444. He built the library of the Austin Friars in London in around 1456.

He helped John Bury write the Gladius Salomonis, which criticised Reginald Pecock, Lowe's successor as Bishop of Asaph, and the writer of ‘The Repressor of Over Much Blaming of the Clergy’. Lowe was one of the judges who condemned Pecock for heresy in 1457.

Lowe made an agreement with the citizens of Rochester respecting his jurisdiction in the town, and before 1459 built a new palace. In politics Lowe supported the Yorkist cause. In 1460 he joined Warwick's force at Rochester, went to Dunstable, and was sent as an emissary to Henry VI at Northampton. He did not, however, see the king, but in the same year was commissioned by the Londoners to accompany the Bishop of Ely and others when they went to ask Edward's intentions respecting the crown.

He made his will on 15 August 1460, and feeling very infirm in 1465 wished to resign. King Edward IV wrote to the pope on the subject, but before any decision was arrived at Lowe died about 21 November 1467, and was buried on the north side of Rochester Cathedral, where there is an altar monument to him with an inscription.

He wrote the following books:

- Sermones coram Rege
- Conciones per annum
- Lecturæ ordinariæ
- Temporum Historiæ
- Disputationes Theologicæ

== Citations ==
Catholic Church titles
Preceded by Robert Lancaster	Bishop of St Asaph; 1433–1444	Succeeded by Reginald Peacock
Preceded by William Wells	Bishop of Rochester; 1444–1467	Succeeded by Thomas Rotherham
