= Richard Praty =

15th-century Bishop of Chichester

- Bishop of Chichester
- Appointed: 21 April 1438
- Term ended: August 1445
- Predecessor: Simon Sydenham
- Successor: Adam Moleyns
- Previous post: Dean of the Chapel Royal

Orders
- Consecration: 27 July 1438

Personal details
- Born: c. 1390
- Died: August 1445
- Denomination: Catholic

Richard Praty (or Pratty, c. 1390 – August 1445) was a medieval university Chancellor and Bishop.

After serving as the King's chaplain from 1430, including two years with him in France, Praty was made Dean of the Chapel Royal in 1432. He gave up this position after being nominated, with the active support of the King, to the office of the Bishop of Chichester on 21 April 1438 and consecrated on 27 July 1438. He was also Chancellor of the University of Oxford during 1438–9.

Praty died in August 1445.

== Citations ==
Academic offices
Preceded by John Carpenter	Chancellor of the University of Oxford; 1438–1439	Succeeded by John Norton
Catholic Church titles
Preceded by Simon Sydenham	Bishop of Chichester; 1438–1445	Succeeded by Adam Moleyns
