= Simon Sydenham =

15th-century Bishop of Chichester

- Bishop of Chichester
- Appointed: 14 October 1429
- Term ended: 26 January 1438
- Predecessor: Thomas Brunce
- Successor: Richard Praty

Orders
- Consecration: 11 February 1431

Personal details
- Died: 26 January 1438
- Denomination: Catholic
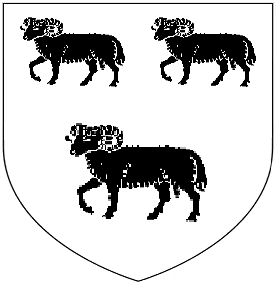
- Coat of arms

Simon Sydenham (died 1438) was a medieval Dean of Salisbury and Bishop of Chichester.

Sydenham was briefly Archdeacon of Berkshire in 1404, then Archdeacon of Salisbury from 1404 to 1418 and Dean of Salisbury from 1418 to 1431. Between 1417 and 1421 he was rector of Sutton Veny, Wiltshire. He was elected Bishop of Salisbury in 1426 but not consecrated, as his election was quashed the following year.

Sydenham was nominated to the office of Bishop of Chichester on 14 October 1429 and consecrated on 11 February 1431. He died on 26 January 1438.

== Citations ==
Catholic Church titles
Preceded by Thomas Brunce	Bishop of Chichester; 1429–1438	Succeeded by Richard Praty
