= Adam Moleyns =

15th-century Bishop of Chichester

- Bishop of Chichester
- Appointed: 24 September 1445
- Term ended: 9 January 1450
- Predecessor: Richard Praty
- Successor: Reginald Pecock
- Other posts: Lord Privy Seal (1444–1450); Dean of Salisbury & Archdeacon of Taunton (1441–1445); Archdeacon of Salisbury (1440–1441)

Orders
- Consecration: 6 February 1446

Personal details
- Died: 9 January 1450 Portsmouth, Hampshire

Adam Moleyns (Note: Or Adam Molyens, Adam Molens, Adam Molins, Adam Molyneaux, Adam Molyneux, Adam de Moleyns) (died 9 January 1450), Bishop of Chichester, was an English bishop, lawyer, royal administrator and diplomat. During the minority of Henry VI of England, he was clerk of the ruling council of the Regent.

== Life ==
Moleyns had the living of Kempsey, Worcestershire from 1433. He was Dean of Salisbury from 1441 to 1446. He became bishop of Chichester on 24 September 1445, and was consecrated bishop on 6 February 1446. He was Lord Privy Seal in 1444, at the same time that he was Protonotary of the Holy See. In 1447 he had permission to fortify the manor house at Bexhill.

And this yeer...maister Adam Moleyns, bisshoppe of Chichestre and keper of the kyngis prive seel, whom the kyng sente to Portesmouth, forto make paiement of money to certayne soudiers and shipmenne for thair wages; and so it happid that with boistez langage, and also for abriggyng of thair wages, he fil in variaunce with thaym, and thay fil on him, and cruelli there kilde him. - The Brut Chronicle

Moleyns was a correspondent of the humanist Aeneas Silvius Piccolomini, Pope Pius II, who complimented him in a letter of 29 May 1444: "And I congratulate you and England, since you care for the art of rhetoric". In 1926 George Warner attributed The Libelle of Englyshe Polycye (1435–38) to Moleyns but this theory was partly based on Warner's mistaken identification of Adam Moleyns as a member of the family's Lancashire branch. The theory of Moleyns' authorship of the poem is now rejected by most historians and scholars.

An active partisan of the unpopular William de la Pole, Duke of Suffolk, Moleyns was lynched in Portsmouth by discontented unpaid soldiers on 9 January 1450.

== Citations ==
Political offices
| Preceded by Thomas Beckington | Lord Privy Seal; 1444–1450 | Succeeded by Andrew Holes |
Catholic Church titles
| Preceded by Richard Praty | Bishop of Chichester; 1446–1450 | Succeeded by Reginald Pecock |
