= Hoxne Brick Pit =

Protected area in Suffolk, England

Coordinates: 52.344°N 1.192°E

- Site of Special Scientific Interest
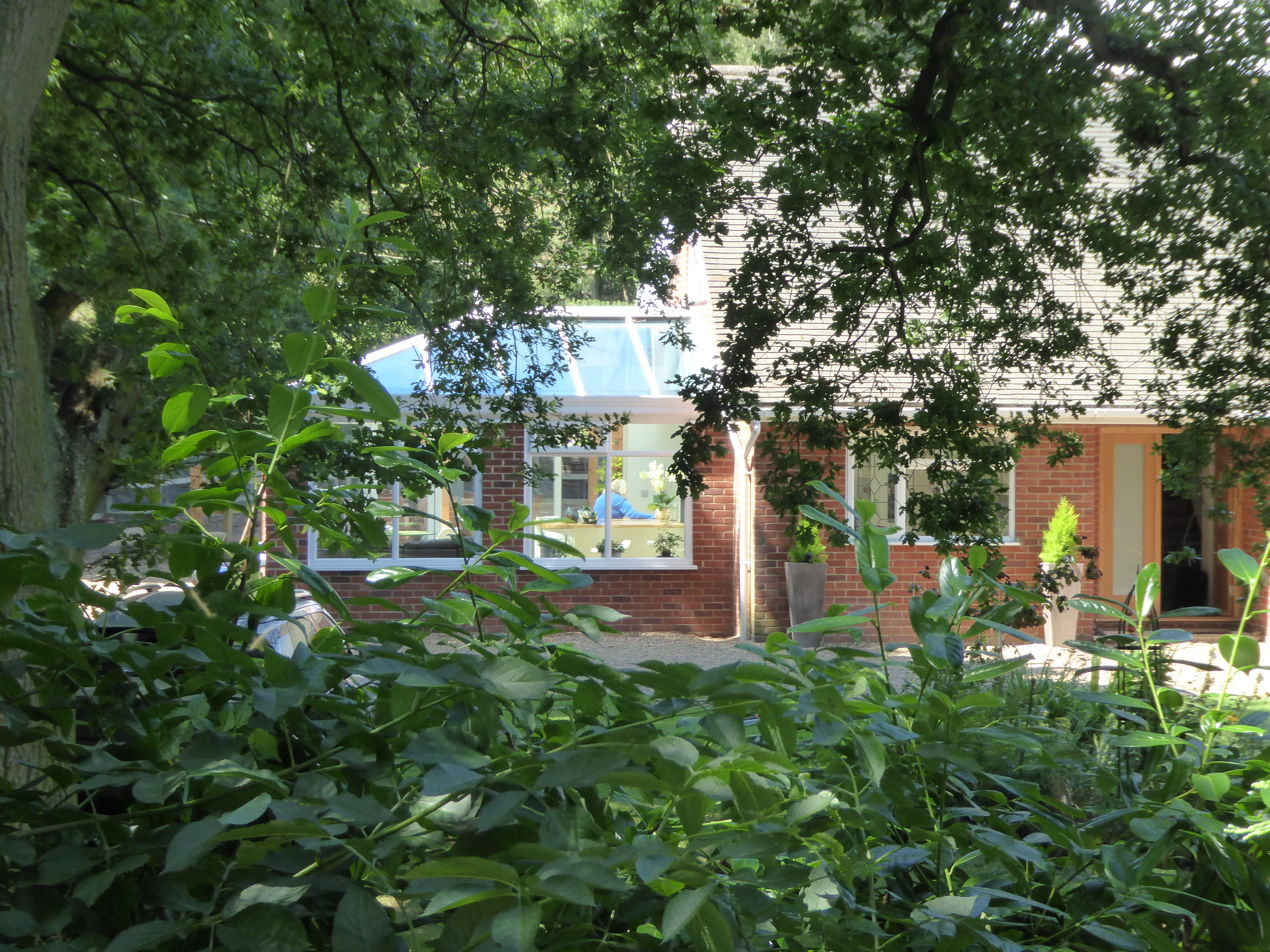
- A house built on the site

- Location within Suffolk
- Location of Hoxne Brick Pit.
- Area of search: Suffolk
- Grid reference: TM 175 766
- Interest: Geological
- Area: 1.9 hectares (0.01900 km^{2}; 0.007336 sq mi)
- Notification date: 15 March 1990

Hoxne Brick Pit is a 1.3-hectare (3.2-acre) geological Site of Special Scientific Interest in Hoxne in Suffolk, England. It is a Geological Conservation Review site.

In 1797, John Frere found flint hand axes, now known to date back 400,000 years, in a deposit twelve feet deep, and commented that "the situation in which these weapons were found may tempt us to refer them to a very remote period indeed; even beyond that of the present world". This is the earliest recognition that hand axes were made by early humans, and was over sixty years before the antiquity of humanity was widely appreciated. One of Frere's hand axes, which was probably a general cutting tool, is held in the British Museum. The site also provides the type deposits of the Hoxnian Stage, an interglacial between around 474,000 and 374,000 years ago, which is named after the site.

The site is on private land with no public access. It has been filled in and there is a house on part of it.
