= John Langdon (bishop) =

15th-century Bishop of Rochester

John Langdon!!!!
- Bishop of Rochester
- Appointed: 17 November 1421
- Term ended: 30 September 1434
- Predecessor: John Kemp
- Successor: Thomas Brunce

Orders
- Consecration: 7 June 1422

Personal details
- Died: 30 September 1434
- Denomination: Catholic

John Langdon (died 30 September 1434) was a medieval Bishop of Rochester.

Langdon was admitted a monk of Christ Church, Canterbury, in 1398. Afterwards he studied at Oxford, and is said to have belonged to Gloucester Hall. He was one of twelve Oxford scholars appointed at the suggestion of convocation in 1411 to inquire into the doctrines of Wycliffe. On 17 November 1421 he was appointed by papal provision to the Diocese of Rochester, and was consecrated on 7 June 1422 at Canterbury by Archbishop Chicheley. After his consecration he appears among the royal councillors, and after 1430 his name constantly occurs among those present at the meetings. In February 1432 he was engaged on an embassy to Charles VII of France. On 18 February 1434 he had licence to absent himself from the council if sent on a mission by the pope or cardinals, and on 3 November of that year was appointed to treat for the reformation of the church and peace with France. Langdon had, however, died at Basle on 30 September.

It is commonly alleged that Langdon's body was brought home for burial at the Charterhouse, Loudon, but in reality he was interred in the choir of the Carthusian monastery at Basle.

== Citations ==
Catholic Church titles
Preceded by John Kemp	Bishop of Rochester; 1421–1434	Succeeded by Thomas Brunce
