= List of cathedrals in Wales =

This is a list of all cathedrals in Wales, both Anglican Church in Wales cathedrals and Roman Catholic cathedrals.

== Church in Wales ==
Map of the Church in Wales cathedrals

There are six dioceses of Wales with a Bishop for each diocese of the Church in Wales. The Archbishop of Wales is elected by the Electoral College from amongst the six Welsh diocesan bishops. The first Archbishop of Wales was enthroned in 1920.

The Welsh Church Act 1914 caused the Church of England to be disestablished in Wales and Monmouthshire in 1920, and allowed the establishment of the Church in Wales and enthronement of the first Archbishop of Wales in the same year. The act introduction states, "An Act to terminate the establishment of the Church of England in Wales and Monmouthshire, and to make provision in respect of the Temporalities thereof, and for other purposes in connection with the matters aforesaid."

Image	Name and dedication	Diocese	Established, location
	Bangor Cathedral Cathedral Church of St Deiniol	Diocese of Bangor	456
	secular canons 1092		
	Brecon Cathedral Cathedral Church of St John the Evangelist	Diocese of Swansea and Brecon	1093
	Benedictine priory 1093/1110–1538		
	Llandaff Cathedral Cathedral Church of St Peter and St Paul, St Dyfrig, St Teilo and St Euddogwy	Diocese of Llandaff	550
	monastery, secular canons 1107		
	Newport Cathedral Cathedral Church of St Woolos	Diocese of Monmouth	1921 as co-cathedral 1949 as cathedral
	former parish church		
	St Asaph Cathedral Cathedral Church of St Asaph	Diocese of St Asaph	1143
	monastery, secular canons 1143		
	St Davids Cathedral Cathedral Church of St David	Diocese of St Davids	580
	secular canons 1116 originally dedicated to St Andrew and St David		

== Catholic Church ==
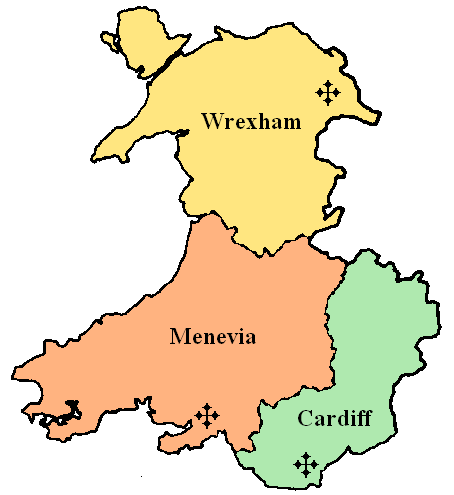
Catholic Province of Cardiff until 2024. A map of the ecclesiastical province in the Catholic Church. The crosses mark where the Cathedrals prior to 2024 of each diocese was located. The pre-2024 specific dioceses are in different colours.

Map of the catholic Catholic cathedrals in Wales

The Welsh and Herefordshire operations of the Catholic Church in England and Wales is divided into three dioceses; the Diocese of Wrexham, the Diocese of Menevia and the Archdiocese of Cardiff. Together these dioceses make up the Catholic Province of Cardiff.

The Archdiocese of Cardiff includes 78 churches including Cardiff cathedral. 70 of these churches are in south east Wales and 8 churches in Herefordshire, England. The Catholic Bishops' Conference of England and Wales is a permanent assembly of Catholic Bishops and Personal Ordinaries in the two member countries of Wales and England.

Image	Name and dedication	Diocese	Established, location
	Cardiff Metropolitan Cathedral Cathedral and Metropolitan Church of St David	Archdiocese of Cardiff-Menevia	1916
	Swansea Cathedral Cathedral Church of St Joseph	Diocese of Menevia (1898–2024)	1987–2024
	church opened in 1888, located in Convent Street, Greenhill, SA1 2BX, now a pro-cathedral		
	Wrexham Cathedral Cathedral Church of Our Lady of Sorrows	Diocese of Wrexham	1907
	parish church 1847 pro-cathedral 1907–1987		

== Former cathedrals ==
Going by the Cathedral definition of seating a bishop this list does not include St David's and St Asaph's attempts to relocate to larger towns and nor will it include any pre 11th century churches that may or may not have had bishops.

Image	Name and dedication	Diocese	Established, location
N/A	Glasbury Cathedral Saint Cynidr	Diocese of St Davids	6th century-1056
N/A	Near Brecon		
	Church of St Kentigern and St Asa Original dedication unknown	Diocese of St Asaph	6th century-1060's century
	St Asaph's former location		
	Belmont Abbey St Michael	Roman Catholic Diocese of Newport and Menevia	1859-1920
	Former co cathedral of the Diocese of Newport and Menevia		

== See also ==
=== Wales ===
- Christianity in Wales
- Religion in Wales
- List of cities in Wales
- List of monastic houses in Wales

=== Elsewhere ===
- List of cathedrals in Scotland
- List of cathedrals in Ireland
- List of cathedrals in England
- List of cathedrals in France
