= Hoxne manor =

Estate in Hoxne, Suffolk, England

Coordinates: 52°20′57″N 1°11′38″E

Hoxne Manor is an estate in Hoxne, Suffolk, England. It was originally a manor house belonging to East Anglian bishops. However, following the dissolution of the monasteries, the land was handed over to favourites at the court of Henry VIII.

== Middle ages ==
Hoxne manor was mentioned in the Domesday Book of 1086 as a seat of the East Anglian bishops. From around that date these were the bishops of Norwich, but previously the bishops of Thetford. The Domesday name of Hoxne hundred, annexed to the manor, was "Bishop's Hundred". At this point Herbert Losinga took Hoxne as a key location from which to compete with the Abbot of St Edmunds; he rededicated the church at Hoxne to honour King Edmund the Martyr, and kept control of the Hoxne manor house, though himself locating elsewhere. Bishops Thomas Brunce and Walter Lyhert died there during the 15th century. It was a residential episcopal manor, and probably the site of a bishop's palace.

== Tudor and Stuart periods ==
The manor house still belonged to the Bishop of Norwich, under the name Hoxun Court, during the reign of Henry VIII of England; it passed to the king in 1535. The manor house site was then occupied by Hoxne Hall and first owned by Charles Brandon, 1st Duke of Suffolk. Then in 1543 it was granted to Sir Robert Southwell, Master of the Rolls.

== Hoxne Hall ==
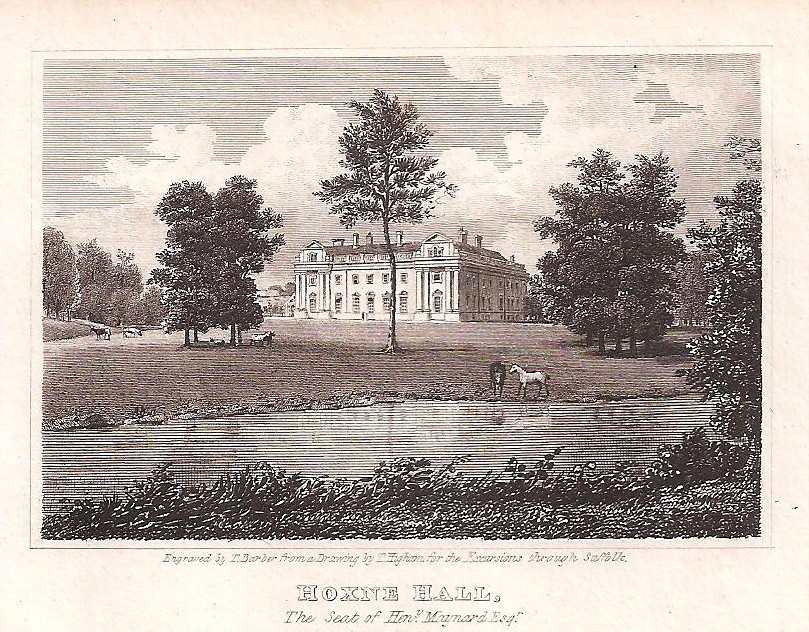
Hoxne Hall by Thomas Higham, 1818

The Suffolk antiquary Augustine Page claimed that Robert Style, a younger brother of Sir Humphrey Style, 1st Baronet, built Hoxne Hall in 1645. Crysogena Prescott had married Style following the death of Sir John Prescott in 1640. It was the seat of the Maynard family, before passing to the Kerrisons, as the seat of the Kerrison Baronets.

== Oakley Park ==
Under the later name Oakley Park it lasted until the 20th century, but was demolished in the period 1923.

== St Edmund's Memorial, Hoxne ==
St Edmund's Memorial marks the place in the grounds of Hoxne manor where an ancient oak stood until 1848. The original monument was erected by either the first or second Kerrison baronet, both called Edward). The current monument was erected by Agnes Burrell Bateman-Hanbury after the first was damaged by a storm in 1905. She was the daughter of the first baronet and sister of the second who had died childless in 1886.
