= Hoxne Priory =

Benedictine priory in Suffolk, England

Coordinates: 52.342°N 1.203°E

Hoxne Priory was a Benedictine priory at Hoxne in Suffolk, England.

It was founded as a religious house around the year 950, with a chapel at the supposed site of the martyrdom of Saint Edmund, king of East Anglia. The chapel was given in 1101 to Norwich Cathedral by Herbert de Losinga, and the priory became dependent on the cathedral. It was rebuilt by 1130 by Maurice of Windsor and his wife Edigia, being completed in 1226.

At the time of the Dissolution of the Monasteries, William Castleton, who would be the first Dean of Norwich, disposed of the priory's property around 1538 to Sir Richard Gresham. The site of the priory is now occupied by the Abbey Farmhouse.

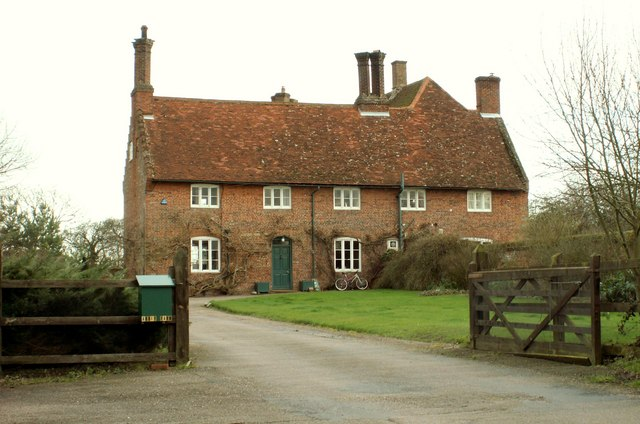
Farmhouse at the Abbey Farm, Hoxne, approximate site of Hoxne Priory.
