= List of cathedrals in British Overseas Territories =

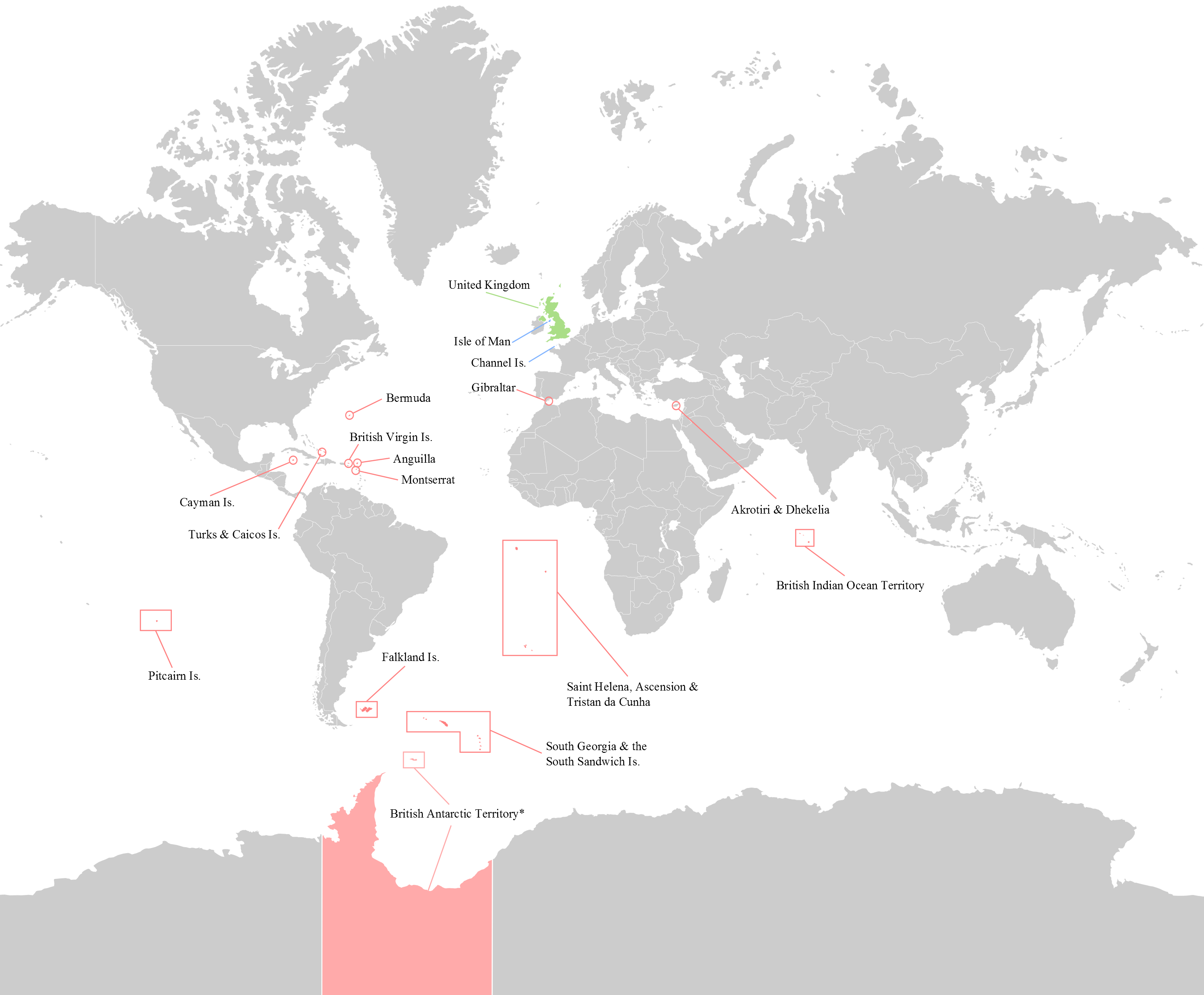
British Overseas Territories United Kingdom Crown Dependencies

The list of cathedrals in British Overseas Territories is organised by territory.

== Bermuda ==
- The Cathedral of the Most Holy Trinity, of the Anglican Church of Bermuda.
- The Cathedral of Saint Theresa of Lisieux, of the Catholic Church.

== Falkland Islands ==
- Christ Church Cathedral, Stanley

== Gibraltar ==
Image	Name and dedication	Diocese	Established/Website/Location
	Holy Trinity Cathedral, Gibraltar (Anglican); Cathedral of the Holy Trinity	Diocese of Europe	1832
			36.138235°N 5.35406°W
	Gibraltar Cathedral (Roman Catholic); Cathedral of St Mary the Crowned	Diocese of Gibraltar	1462
			36.139672°N 5.35366°W

== Saint Helena ==
- Saint Paul's Cathedral (Anglican)

== See also ==
- List of cathedrals in the United Kingdom
