= Richard Caudray =

English cleric (c. 1390–1458)

Richard Caudray (c. 1390–1458) was an English cleric. He was a clerk of the king's council, a chancellor of Cambridge University, and dean of the College of St. Martin le Grand, London. He was Henry V's secretary in France. As a Westminster secretary, he would have had various literary connections, such as to John Hethe, John Offord, and Thomas Hoccleve; he was also a personal friend of John Shirley.

He is likely the author of the Libelle of Englyshe Polycye.
