= Hoxne =

Village in Suffolk, England

Coordinates: 52.35°N 1.2°E

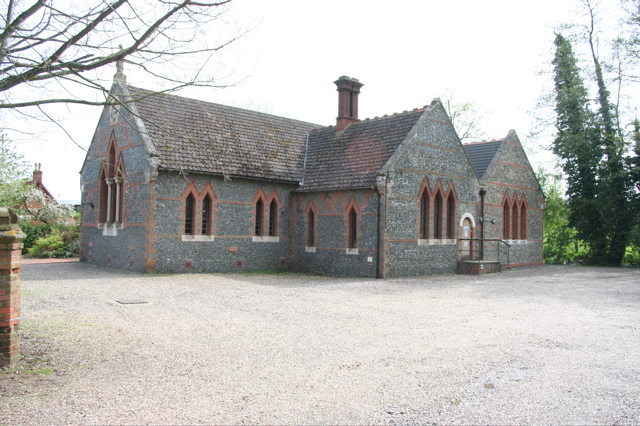
- Village Hall, Hoxne

- Location within Suffolk
- Population: 889 (2011)
- District: Mid Suffolk
- Shire county: Suffolk
- Region: East
- Country: England
- Sovereign state: United Kingdom
- Post town: EYE
- Postcode district: IP21
- Dialling code: 01379

Hoxne (/ˈhɒksən/ HOK-sən) is a village and civil parish in the Mid Suffolk district of Suffolk, England, about five miles (8 km) east-southeast of Diss, Norfolk and 1/2 mile (800 m) south of the River Waveney. The parish is irregularly shaped, covering the villages of Hoxne, Cross Street and Heckfield Green, with a 'tongue' extending southwards to take in part of the former RAF Horham airfield. In 2011 the parish had a population of 889.

In geology, Hoxne gives its name to the Hoxnian Stage, a British regional subdivision of the Pleistocene Epoch.

== Overview ==
The area around the village is of significant archaeological importance, as the find-spot of the Hoxne Hoard of Roman treasure, very early finds of handaxes and as the type site for the Hoxnian Stage ("Hoxnian Interglacial").

In 1797, John Frere (1740-1807) found flint hand tools twelve feet deep in Hoxne Brick Pit, and he was the first person to recognise ancient tools as being man-made. One of his hand axes is in the British Museum. His letter to the Society of Antiquaries, read on 22 June 1797 and published in the Society's journal Archaeologia in 1800, argued for the antiquity of these handaxes as "even beyond the present world," in a period now recognised as belonging to the Lower Paleolithic Age. Frere argued that these "weapons" were coincident with nearby extinct elephant fossils, in strata at the site of what is now known to be a Middle Pleistocene lake formed during the Great Interglacial geological warming period in Europe. Accordingly, in Britain that entire period is called "Hoxnian," signifying its identification there, based on evidence from undisturbed layers of pollens from plants and trees found at Frere's site in the 1950s (notably by Richard Gilbert West), which established the cycle of warming and cooling and defined the stages of the Great Interglacial. Teams headed by the University of Chicago made extensive excavations at Frere's site for five years between 1971 and 1978. They confirmed the date of the handaxes as ca 400,000 years BP, coincident with the Swanscombe finds, which, unlike the Hoxne, include human remains. Subsequent research by the Ancient Human Occupation of Britain team has confirmed the presence of these ancestors of the Neanderthals as occurring towards the terminal, cooling phase of the Interglacial period, which, according to Chris Stringer, "came to an end,...taking with it the lush river valleys, forests and grasslands on which the herds of horses and deer, and their hunters, relied. Ice sheets returned...to the north-west of Europe...and a new pattern of episodic occupation was set in motion," lasting over three hundred thousand years. Hoxne Brick Pit is a geological Site of Special Scientific Interest, but it has been filled in and a house been built on part of it.

== Hoxne Hoard ==
The Hoxne Hoard, found in 1992, is the largest hoard of late Roman silver and gold discovered in Britain, and the largest collection of gold and silver coins of the fourth and fifth century found anywhere within the Roman Empire. Only fourteen years after the last dig by the University of Chicago team, on the same farm, only a few hundred metres south along the road, the Hoxne Hoard was discovered by a metal detectorist on 16 November 1992. The Hoard consists of 14,865 Roman gold, silver and bronze coins from the late fourth and early fifth centuries and approximately 200 items of silver tableware and gold jewelry. These objects are now in the British Museum in London, where the most important pieces and a selection of the rest are on permanent display. In 1993, the Treasure Valuation Committee valued the hoard at £1.75 million (today £2.66 million).

The village is also home to a 15th-century Grade II* listed lodge, formerly known as Bishops' Lodge, built in 1480 by the Bishop of Norwich. It is today a popular pub, The Swan.

== Saint Edmund ==
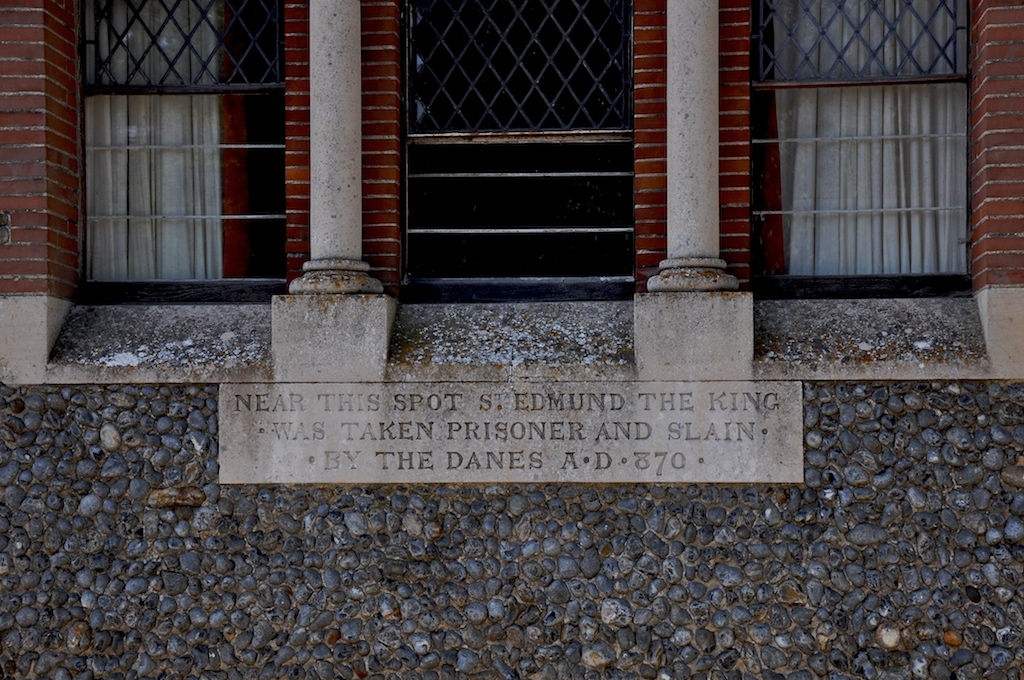
Inscription on Hoxne Village Hall

A local tradition concerns the death of Saint Edmund, King of East Anglia. It is said he hid under Goldbrook Bridge to elude the pursuing Danes. A newly married couple saw the king's gold spurs and gave his location away to his enemies. According to the legend, Saint Edmund put a curse on all couples who cross the bridge on their way to get married. The account continues, explaining how he was subsequently killed by the Danes at St Edmund's Memorial, Hoxne after refusing to disavow Christianity.

Jean Ingelow's poem 'The Tradition of the Golden Spurs' tells of this legend and she added the following note:

- About the year 870, the Danes under Ivar the Boneless invaded East Anglia, which was then governed by Edmund, a king of singular virtue and piety.
- After defending his people with great valour, Edmund was at last defeated in a battle fought near Hoxne in Suffolk. Being hotly pursued, he concealed himself under a bridge called Gold-bridge. The glittering of his golden spurs discovered him to a newly married couple who were returning home by moonlight, and the bride betrayed him to his enemies.
- The heathen Danes offered him his crown and his life if he would deny the Christian faith, but he continued steadfast, and when he was dragged on to the bridge, he pronounced a malediction (or warning) on all who should afterwards pass over it on their way to be married, the dread of which is still so strong in the neighbourhood that it is said no bride or bridegroom has ever been known to pass over it to this day.

== See also ==
- Hoxne Hundred
- Hoxne manor
- Hoxne Priory
