= Walter Hart =

15th-century Bishop of Norwich

- Bishop of Norwich
- Appointed: 24 January 1446
- Term ended: 24 May 1472
- Predecessor: Thomas Brunce
- Successor: James Goldwell

Orders
- Consecration: 27 February 1446

Personal details
- Died: 24 May 1472
- Buried: Norwich Cathedral
- Denomination: Roman Catholic

Walter Hart (or Walter Lyhert; died 24 May 1472) was a medieval Bishop of Norwich. He was Provost of Oriel College, Oxford, from 1435 to 1446. He was nominated as bishop on 24 January 1446 and was consecrated on 27 February 1446. He died on 24 May 1472.

The executors of his will are named as William Pykenham, archdeacon of Suffolk, John Bulman, Robert Hober, Henry Smyth, and another (illegible).

He features in the Paston Letters, especially their correspondence in 1469, when he was drawn into the efforts by her mother and brothers to prevent Margery Paston from marrying their bailiff Richard Calle.

In 1899, Lyhert's tomb was opened during building works at Norwich Cathedral. Small fragments of the red and purple ceremonial robe with which he was buried were taken as samples. Most of these were kept in Norwich, though about 16 of the fragments were donated to the Victoria and Albert Museum in London. Research has found that the robe had two designs, the first featuring the monogram M (possibly standing for Mary) and tulip-like floral designs, and the second featuring further floral elements as well as pomegranates and what are possibly phoenixes for which gilded silver thread was used. In 2025, these fragments were pieced together to recreate the fabric, and this was put on display at Norwich Castle.

== Citations ==
Academic offices
| Preceded by John Carpenter | Provost of Oriel College, Oxford; 1435–1446 | Succeeded by John Hals |
Catholic Church titles
| Preceded by Thomas Brunce | Bishop of Norwich; 1446–1472 | Succeeded by James Goldwell |
