= Haegelisdun =

Site where Edmund the Martyr the King of East Anglia was killed

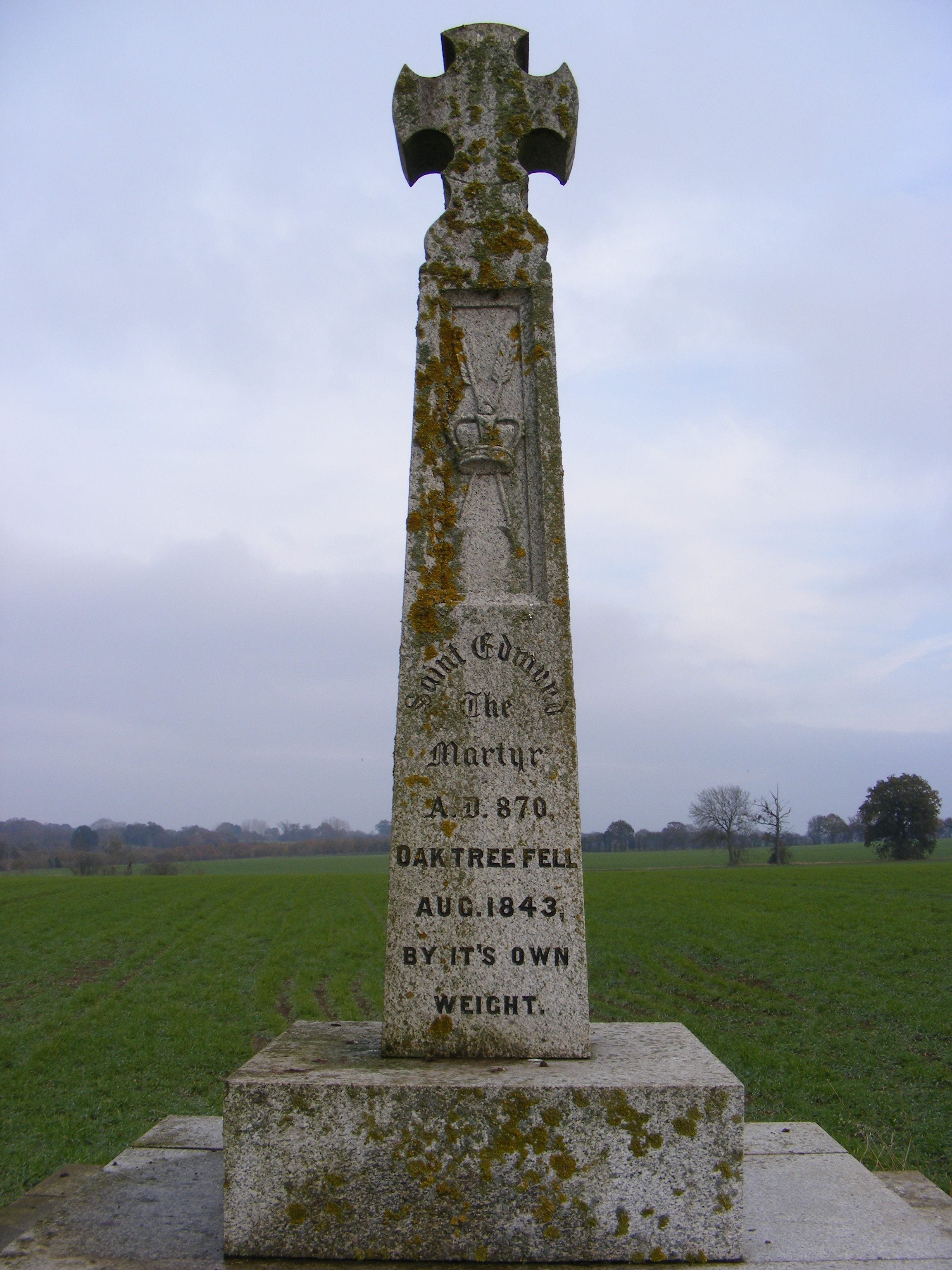
St Edmund's Memorial in Hoxne, Suffolk, marking the location of an ancient oak tree, supposed to be the site of Edmund's death.

Haegelisdun was the site where Edmund the Martyr the King of East Anglia was killed by the Viking Great Heathen Army, and was the initial place where his relics were venerated before moving to Beodricesworth monastery (modern day Bury St Edmunds).

St Edmund's incorrupt relics had been venerated from around the early tenth century at in a wooden chapel in Haegelisdun commemorating the original burial place near to where he was killed.

The location has never been conclusively identified. The placename was long and widely thought - probably in error - to refer to Hoxne in Suffolk. Other proposed sites have been Bradfield St Clare, Hellesdon in Norfolk (documented as Hægelisdun c. 985) and more recently Maldon in Essex.

At a date generally assumed by historians to have been during the reign of Æthelstan, who became king of the Anglo-Saxons in 924, Edmund's body was translated from Haegelisdun to Beodricesworth monastery.

== Bibliography ==
- Briggs, Keith (2011). "Was Hægelisdun in Essex? A New Site for the Martyrdom of Edmund". Proceedings of the Suffolk Institute of Archaeology & History. XLII, Part 3: 278.
- Evans, Margaret Carey (1987). "The Contribution of Hoxne to the Cult of St Edmund King and Martyr in the Middle Ages and Later". Proceedings of the Suffolk Institute of Archaeology & History. XXXVI, Part 3: 182.
- Gransden, A (March 1994). "The Alleged Incorruption of the Body of St Edmund King and Martyr". The Antiquaries Journal. 74: 135–168. doi:10.1017/S0003581500024410.
- Higham, N. J. (1999). "East Anglia, Kingdom of". In M. Lapidge; et al. (eds.). The Blackwell Encyclopedia of Anglo-Saxon England. London: Blackwell. pp. 154–155. ISBN 978-0-631-22492-1.
- Pinner, Rebecca (2015). The Cult of St Edmund in Medieval East Anglia (Hardcover). Woodbridge: Boydell Press. p. 276. ISBN 9781783270354.
- Ridyard, Susan J. (1988). The Royal Saints of Anglo-Saxon England: a Study of West Saxon & East Anglian Cults. Cambridge: Cambridge University Press. ISBN 978-0-521-30772-7.
- Young, Francis (2018). Edmund: In Search of England's Lost King. London: Bloomsbury. ISBN 978-17867-3-361-0.
