= Libelle of Englyshe Polycye =

The Libelle of Englyshe Polycye (or Libel of English Policy) is a fifteenth-century poem written in English. The work exists in two redactions: the first was composed after the siege of Calais in 1436 but before the end of 1438, and a second edition of the work before June 1441. This second edition was probably revised again. Nineteen manuscripts contain the Libelle, which consists of about 1,100 lines in rhyming couplets, with a proem in rhyme-royal and a stanzaic envoi that differs between the poem's two editions.

== Overview ==
The Libelle combines mercantilism with a jingoistic approach to England's neighbours. It recommends tight control of the British Sea and the Channel in particular to ensure prosperity and tranquility. Given England's waning fortunes in the Hundred Years War following Burgundy's alliance with France after the Treaty of Arras, the Libelle advocates a defence of the wool staple at Calais at any cost, besides "keeping" Wales and Ireland. This staunchly colonial position is complemented by a long list of European territories and countries with an inventory of their commodities. Finally, the poem complains about widespread piracy, the devaluation of English currency, and closes with a meditation on the value of peace.

== Authorship ==
In 1926, George Warner attributed the poem to Adam Moleyns, but this theory was partly based on Warner's mistaken identification of Moleyns as a member of the family's Lancashire branch. Dismantled by G. A. Holmes in 1961, the theory of Moleyns's authorship has since been abandoned. John Lydgate has also been proposed as the poem's author, but this theory has been rejected by Frank Taylor. William Lyndwood, Keeper of the Privy Seal from 1432 to 1443 and the son of a wool merchant, has also been associated with the poem's production. In 2019, Sebastian Sobecki identified the author as Richard Caudray, Moleyn's immediate predecessor as clerk of the council who stepped down from this role in 1435 and was therefore best placed to compose this poem. Caudray's composition of the Book of the Council, his political views, and a further evidence points to his role behind the poem.

== Reception ==
Although the poem did not alter foreign policy at the time, it became influential during the formulation of English mercantilism in subsequent centuries. The Paston family appears to have possessed a copy of the work in the fifteenth century. The Libelle was first printed by Hakluyt in the second edition of his Principall Navigations (1598–1600). Another prominent sixteenth-century owner was Elizabeth I's Lord High Treasurer, William Cecil (Lord Burghley). John Selden used the work to mount his case for closed seas in his Mare clausum (1635) and Samuel Pepys, clerk of the acts at the Navy Board, owned a copy, as did the influential seventeenth-century barrister Matthew Hale.

== Critical approaches ==
Interpretation has focussed on the mercantile aspects of the poem. Carol Meale proposes that the poem's "composition was encouraged by mercantile patronage", whereas John Scattergood suggests that the poem's bullishly colonialist and protectionist outlook offers "a redefinition of the nation" by reference to the "specific sectional interest" of merchants. Sebastian Sobecki draws attention to the use of legal forms in the poem and its interest in documentary authenticity, placing the work in a bureaucratic government context. In his identification of Richard Caudray as the poem's author, Sobecki links the poem's production to Caudray's departure from the council in 1435 and appointment as chief secretary to John Holland, high admiral of England, Ireland, and Aquitaine, and later duke of Exeter.

== Editions ==
- Warner, George, ed. (1926) [1st pub. 1436]. The Libelle of Englyshe Polycye: A Poem on the Use of Sea-Power. Oxford: Clarendon Press.
- The Libelle of Englyshe Polycye. In Anthony Bale and Sebastian Sobecki, ed. (2019). Medieval English Travel: A Critical Anthology. Oxford: Oxford University Press. pp. 303–351. ISBN 978-0-19-873378-2

== Bibliography ==
- Breeze, Andrew, "Sir John Paston, Lydgate, and The Libelle of Englyshe Polycye", Notes and Queries, n.s., 48 (2001), 230–31.
- Edwards, A.S.G., "A New Manuscript of The Libelle of English Policy", Notes and Queries, n.s., 46 (1999), pp. 444–45.
- Henn, Volker, "The Libelle of Englyshe Polycye: Politik und Wirtschaft in England in den 30er Jahren des 15. Jahrhunderts", Hansische Geschichtsblätter, 101 (1983), pp. 43–65.
- Holmes, George, "The Libel of English Policy", The English Historical Review, 76 (1961), pp. 193–216.
- Meale, Carol, "The Libelle of Englyshe Polycye and Mercantile Literary Culture in Late-medieval London", in Julia Boffey and Pamela King, eds. London and Europe in the Later Middle Ages (London: Centre for Medieval and Renaissance Studies, Queen Mary and Westfield College, University of London, 1996), ISBN 1-870059-07-7, pp. 181–228.
- Lester, Godfrey, "The Books of a Fifteenth-Century English Gentleman: Sir John Paston", Neuphilologische Mitteilungen, 88 (1987), 200–217.
- Scattergood, John, "The Libelle of Englyshe Polycye: the Nation and its Place", in Nation, Court and Culture: New Essays on Fifteenth-Century English Poetry, ed. by Helen Cooney (Dublin: Four Courts Press, 2001), ISBN 1-85182-566-5, 28–49.
- Scattergood, John, Politics and Poetry in the Fifteenth Century (London: Blandford Press, 1971).
- Sobecki, Sebastian. "Bureaucratic Verse: William Lyndwood, the Privy Seal, and the Form of the Libelle of Englyshe Polycye". New Medieval Literatures 12, no. 1 (2011): 251–288. doi:10.1484/J.NML.1.102188
- Sobecki, Last Words: The Public Self and the Social Author in Late Medieval England (Oxford: Oxford University Press, 2019), 101–126. ISBN 978-0-19-879077-8. doi:10.1093/oso/9780198790778.001.0001
- Sobecki, The Sea and Medieval English Literature (Cambridge: Brewer, 2008), Chapter 6. ISBN 978-1-84615-591-8
- Taylor, Frank. "Some Manuscripts of The Libelle of Englyshe Polycye", John Rylands Library Bulletin, 24 (1940), 376–418.
