= List of cathedrals in Scotland =

This is a list of cathedrals in Scotland.

A cathedral church is a Christian place of worship that is the chief, or 'mother' church of a diocese. The distinction of cathedral refers to that church being the location of the cathedra, the seat of the bishop. In the strictest sense, only Christian denominations with an episcopal hierarchy — those that are led by bishops — possess cathedrals. However, in common parlance, the title cathedral is often still used to refer to former Scottish cathedrals, which are now within the (presbyterian) Church of Scotland.

Because of Scotland's religious history, cathedrals of several different Christian denominations are found around the country. Before the Scottish Reformation, the Christian church in Scotland was Catholic. Its thirteen dioceses were each governed by a bishop whose Episcopal see was centred on a cathedral. In 1560, the Scottish church broke communion with Rome and became Protestant. After years of dispute, the post-Reformation Church of Scotland finally abolished the Episcopacy in 1689 and adopted the Presbyterian system of governance. Scotland's former cathedrals remained in use as parish churches, now organised under a system of synods and presbyteries.

The Scottish Episcopal Church formed as a breakaway from the Established Church of Scotland, retaining the system of bishops, was Anglican, but it was excluded from mainstream religious life. In the later 19th century, laws repressing Episcopalian and Catholic worship were repealed (for example, under the Roman Catholic relief bills). With their newfound freedom, these denominations flourished and began to build their own cathedrals. For this reason, Scotland's Episcopalian and Catholic cathedrals are mostly Victorian in origin.

Episcopal cathedrals in Scotland
Former Cathedrals of the Church of Scotland
Catholic cathedrals in Scotland

== Church of Scotland ==
The Church of Scotland is no longer governed by bishops, and so officially has no cathedrals. However, buildings that were cathedrals prior to the Reformation, or in periods of the church's history when it did have an episcopacy, are still commonly called "cathedrals". They are often denoted by the title "High Kirk".

Image	Name & dedication	Presbytery	Established	Website	Location
St Machar's Cathedral	St Machar, Aberdeen	Aberdeen	1131	www.stmachar.com	57°10′11″N 2°06′08″W
Brechin Cathedral	Brechin Cathedral	Angus	13th century	building closed 2021, awaiting disposal	56°43′55″N 2°39′42″W
Dornoch Cathedral	Dornoch Cathedral	Sutherland	13th century	www.dornoch-cathedral.com	57°52′52″N 4°01′47″W
Dunblane Cathedral	Dunblane Cathedral	Stirling	7th century	www.dunblanecathedral.org.uk	56°11′22″N 3°57′55″W
Dunkeld Cathedral	Dunkeld Cathedral	Dunkeld and Meigle	1260	www.dunkeldcathedral.org.uk	56°33′54″N 3°35′23″W
St Giles Cathedral	St Giles, Edinburgh	Edinburgh	12th century	www.stgilescathedral.org.uk	55°56′58″N 3°11′27″W
St Mungo's, Glasgow	St Mungo, Glasgow	Glasgow	1136	www.glasgowcathedral.org.uk	55°51′47″N 4°14′05″W
St. Magnus Cathedral at Sunset	St Magnus, Kirkwall	Orkney	1137	www.stmagnus.org	58°58′56″N 2°57′32″W
St Moluag's Cathedral	St Moluag, Lismore	Argyll	592	isleoflismore.com	56°32′04″N 5°28′50″W

== Catholic Church ==
=== Province of St Andrews and Edinburgh ===
Image	Name & dedication	Diocese	Established/Website/Location
	Aberdeen Cathedral; Cathedral Church of St Mary of the Assumption	Diocese of Aberdeen	1880
			57°08′43″N 2°06′23″W
	Ayr Cathedral; Cathedral Church of St Margaret	Diocese of Galloway	1822
	Translated from Good Shepherd, St John's Street		
	Dundee Cathedral; Cathedral Church of St Andrew	Diocese of Dunkeld	1782
			56°27′27″N 2°58′29″W
	Edinburgh Cathedral; Cathedral and Metropolitan Church of St Mary	Archdiocese of St Andrews and Edinburgh	1814
	Mother church of the province of St Andrew's and Edinburgh		55°57′22″N 3°11′16″W
	Oban Cathedral; Cathedral Church of St Columba	Diocese of Argyll and the Isles	1932

=== Province of Glasgow ===
Image	Name & dedication	Diocese	Established/Website/Location
	Glasgow Cathedral; Cathedral and Metropolitan Church of St Andrew	Archdiocese of Glasgow	1797
			55°51′20″N 4°15′10″W
	Motherwell Cathedral; Cathedral Church of Our Lady of Good Aid	Diocese of Motherwell	1947
	Church consecrated in 1929.		55°47′29″N 3°59′13″W
	Paisley Cathedral; Cathedral Church of St Mirin	Diocese of Paisley	1948
	Church consecrated in 1931.		55°50′51″N 4°25′00″W

== Scottish Episcopal Church ==
Image	Name & dedication	Diocese	Established/Website/Location
	Aberdeen Cathedral; Cathedral Church of St Andrew	Diocese of Aberdeen and Orkney	1817
			57°08′57″N 2°05′34″W
	Dundee Cathedral; Cathedral Church of St Paul	Diocese of Brechin	1855
			56°27′40″N 2°58′05″W
	Edinburgh Cathedral; Cathedral Church of St Mary	Diocese of Edinburgh	1879
			55°56′55″N 3°12′59″W
	Glasgow Cathedral; Cathedral Church of St Mary the Virgin	Diocese of Glasgow and Galloway	1871
			55°52′24″N 4°16′30″W
	Inverness Cathedral; Cathedral Church of St Andrew	Diocese of Moray, Ross and Caithness	1869
			57°28′28″N 4°13′45″W
	Millport Cathedral; Cathedral of The Isles and Collegiate Church of the Holy Spirit	Diocese of Argyll and The Isles	1882
	Cathedral of The Isles		55°45′20″N 4°55′27″W
	Oban Cathedral; Cathedral Church of St John the Divine	Diocese of Argyll and The Isles	1864
	co-cathedral with Millport		
	Perth Cathedral; Cathedral Church of St Ninian	Diocese of Saint Andrews, Dunkeld and Dunblane	1850

== Greek Orthodox Church, also serving other Orthodox communities ==
Image	Name & dedication	Diocese	Established/Website/Location
	Glasgow Orthodox Cathedral; Cathedral Church of St Luke		1954
	1877 Belhaven Presbyterian Church		

== International Synaxis of True Orthodox Churches ==
Image	Name and dedication	Diocese	Established/Website/Location
	Greyfriars Church, Dumfries Cathedral Church of Our Lady and Saint Ninian	Diocese of the British Isles	55°04′13″N 3°36′45″W

== See also ==
- Church architecture in Scotland
- List of former cathedrals in Great Britain
- List of cathedrals
- Religion in Scotland
