= Free Church of Scotland (since 1900) =

Scottish Calvinist church

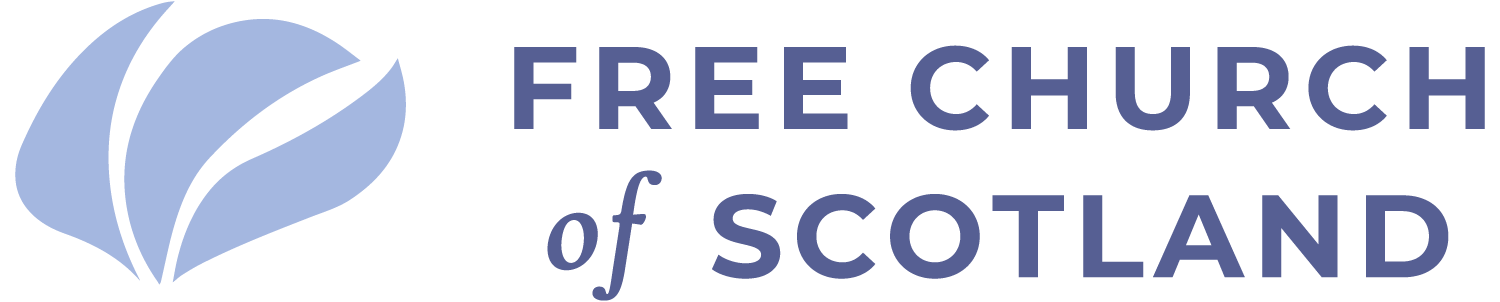
- Classification: Christian
- Orientation: Protestant
- Theology: Calvinism
- Polity: Presbyterian
- Moderator: Rev. Calum Iain Macleod
- Associations: World Reformed Fellowship; International Conference of Reformed Churches
- Region: Scotland and North America
- Headquarters: Edinburgh
- Origin: 1843
- Branched from: Church of Scotland
- Separations: United Free Church of Scotland (most congregations joined it 1900); Free Church of Scotland (Continuing) (separated 2000)
- Congregations: ~111 (details)
- Members: (Average attendance:) 7,796; 6,552 communicant members
- Ministers: ~60
- Official website: freechurch.org

The Free Church of Scotland (Scottish Gaelic: An Eaglais Shaor; Scots: Free Kirk o Scotland) is a conservative evangelical Calvinist denomination in Scotland. It is the continuation of the original Free Church of Scotland that remained outside the union with the United Presbyterian Church of Scotland in 1900, and remains a distinct Presbyterian denomination in Scotland.

From 1900, when the majority of the Free Church joined the United Presbyterians to form the United Free Church, the Free Church became known, pejoratively, as "The Wee Frees", even though, in 21st-century Scotland, it is the largest Presbyterian denomination after the Church of Scotland. As this term was originally used in comparing the Free Church unfavourably with the United Free Church, the Free Church of Scotland now deprecates its use.

== Theology and doctrine ==
The church maintains its commitment to Calvinist theology (as espoused by the Westminster Confession). Its polity is Presbyterian. A complete psalter in modern English was published in 2003. Its offices and theological college remain on The Mound, Edinburgh, although the denomination no longer holds the original Free Church College buildings.

The Free Church continues to be Reformed and conservative evangelical in character, presenting its understanding of the Christian message, namely that Jesus Christ is sole Lord and Saviour.

The Free Church of Scotland opposes both abortion and same-sex marriage. It has also stated its opposition to banning conversion therapy.

== History ==
=== Aftermath of the union of 1900 ===
In 1900 the Free Church of Scotland united with the United Presbyterian Church of Scotland to form the United Free Church of Scotland. However, a minority of the original Free Church remained outside this new union. The protesting and dissenting minority at once claimed to be the legitimate Free Church. They met outside the Free Assembly Hall on 31 October and, failing to gain admission, withdrew to another hall, where they elected Rev Colin Bannatyne as Moderator and held the remaining sittings of their Assembly. It was reported that between 16,000 and 17,000 names had been received of persons adhering to the anti-unionist principle. It has been estimated that the number of Free Church communicants dropped from a little under 300,000 in 1899 to just over 4,000 in 1900.

At the Assembly of 1901 it was stated that the Free Church had twenty-five ministers and at least sixty-three congregations, with most being found in the Gaelic-speaking districts of Scotland.

The initial problems were obvious: the congregations soon grew in number, but were far apart; there were not nearly enough ministers; the church was treated in a hostile manner by the United Free Church; work was conducted under considerable hardship; and there was little success in appealing to the general popular sentiment of Scotland. However, the revenue of the church gradually increased; in 1901, the sustentation fund was able to support only 75 ministers, but by 1903 it maintained 167.

=== The Free Church case ===
After the union of 1900, the United Presbyterian Church and the continuing Free Church not only contested the legacy of the Free Church of 1843–1900, but also claimed its assets. After attempts at agreement failed, the matter ended in the Scottish courts. The litigation was initially decided in favour of the Free Church by the House of Lords in 1904, on the basis that in the absence of a power to change fundamental doctrines in the trust deed, a dissenting minority retains the property. As it was not possible for the Free Church to use all the property, Parliament intervened, the Elgin Commission generally securing for the church the congregational property she could effectively use plus a significant share of central assets.

The following was the result:

Congregations where the Free Church rather than the United Free Church ended up with the buildings. (In most of these cases the UFC subsequently built a new church. In one case (Tongue) they actually bought the church straight back again.)

Aberdeen St Columba's, Acharacle, Alvie, Arisaig, Assynt, Aultbea, Back, Barvas, Berriedale, Bower, Brodick, Bruan, Carloway, Clyne, Coatbridge West, Coigach, Contin, Creich, Croick, Cross, Daviot, Dingwall, Dornoch, Dundee St Stephen's, Duthil, Eddrachillis, Edinburgh Buccleuch-Greyfriars, Farr, Fearn, Fort Augustus, Gairloch, Glasgow Cranstonhill, Glasgow Duke Street, Glasgow Hope Street, Glasgow Milton, Glenelg, Glenorchy, Glenshiel, Golspie, Greenock Gaelic, Helmsdale, Inverness North, Keiss, Kilbrandon, Kildalton-Oa, Killearnan, Kilmallie, Kilmory (Arran), Kilmuir (Skye), Kilmuir Easter, Kiltearn, Kincardine, Kinglassie, Kinloch, Knock, Knockbain West, Kyle of Lochalsh, Lairg, Leith Elder Memorial, Lochalsh, Lochcarron, Lochs, Lybster, Moy, North Uist, Olrig, Park, Perth Knox's, Raasay, Renton Gaelic, Rogart, Rosehall, Rosskeen, Shawbost, Shiskine, Sleat, Snizort, Stornoway High, Strathgarve, Strathpeffer-Fodderty, Strathy, Tarbat, Tarbert (Loch Fyne), Tobermory, Tongue, Urquhart, Watten, Whiting Bay

Congregations with more than one place of worship, where one of the churches was allocated to the FC:

Bernera (Lewis), Forres Cumming Street, Kilninver, Kingussie, Tayvallich

=== The Church in the 20th century ===
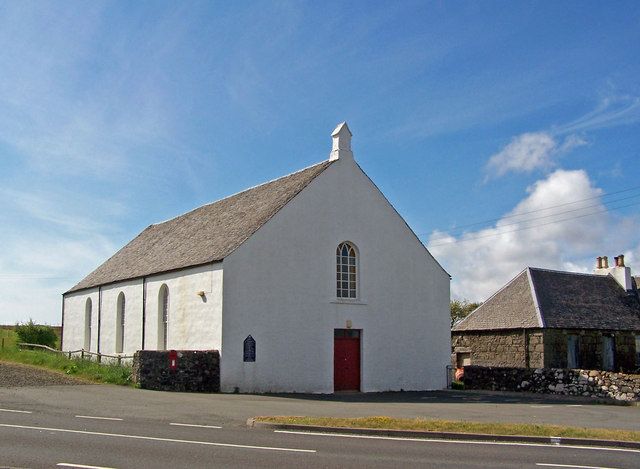
Free Church in Lonmore. The Free Church of Scotland has historically been known as "the church without the steeple".

In 1906, a Free Church College was re-established in Edinburgh and by 1925 there were 91 ministers and 170 congregations in 12 presbyteries. The general magazine of the Free Church is The Monthly Record and there are magazines for young people. Two of the professors in the Free Church College began a theological journal the Evangelical Quarterly in 1929, but in 1942 control passed outside the church, initially to Inter Varsity Fellowship. Today the College offers degrees in conjunction with the University of Glasgow.

Post-1945, the Free Church engaged with the wider evangelical cause, but after its growth in the early decades, it began a statistical decline that, except for a short period in the 1980s, continued throughout the 20th century.

=== 2000 events ===
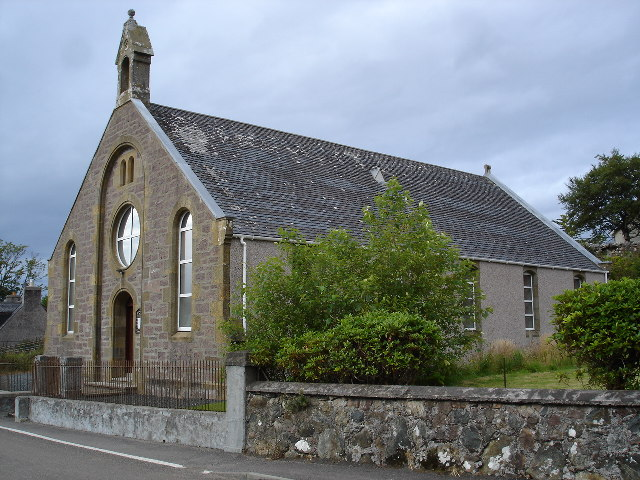
Free Church in Poolewe

In the 1980s and 1990s there were allegations of sexual misconduct against Donald Macleod, principal of the Free Church College. No misconduct was ever proven against Macleod; he was tried and acquitted in 1996 in the civil courts. A faction hostile to Macleod's modernising theology pursued the charges in church courts, to no avail.

There was considerable dissatisfaction with the handling of the charges, and claims of a cover-up. When Rev Maurice Roberts of the Free Church Defence Association (FCDA) publicly reiterated accusations against Macleod, and denounced the General Assembly for its "wickedness and hypocrisy", he was suspended sine die for contumacy. Roberts' supporters demanded his reinstatement; in January 2000, 22 FCDA ministers were removed from their pulpits. These and other ministers formed the Free Church of Scotland (Continuing) (FCC); they are approximately 20% of the ministerial strength of the pre-2000 Free Church of Scotland. From 2005 to 2010, the Free Church of Scotland saw an 18% drop in its membership.

Following the split, the Free Church Continuing sought a declarator from the Court of Session as to ownership of the central funds and properties of the church. In a landmark decision, Lady Paton dismissed their action without granting absolvitor. The Continuing Church then said they would appeal Lady Paton's decision, but ultimately chose not to proceed. In March 2007, the Free Church filed suit to reclaim the church manse at Broadford, Isle of Skye. Lord Uist ruled that the property belonged to the Free Church. The Continuing Church had to pay the expenses of the Free Church. The Continuing Church appealed to the Inner House of the Court of Session, which upheld Lord Uist.

=== List of moderators ===
- 1900: Colin Archibald Bannatyne, Coulter, South Lanarkshire
- 1901: James Duff MacCulloch, Hope Street, Glasgow
- 1902: Donald MacKinnon Macalister, Edinburgh
- 1903: Angus Galbraith, Lochalsh
- 1904: Murdoch MacQueen, Kiltearn
- 1905: Ewan Macleod, Oban
- 1906: Colin Archibald Bannatyne, Free Church College
- 1907: Murdo Mackenzie, Inverness; Interim Moderator J. C. Robertson (resigned)
- 1908: William MacKinnon, Gairloch
- 1909: James Hendry, Forres/Burghead
- 1910: John Kennedy Cameron, Free Church College
- 1911: William Menzies Alexander, Free Church College
- 1912: William Fraser, Strathpeffer, Dingwall
- 1913: Samuel Lyle Orr, Glasgow
- 1914: Finlay MacRae, Plockton
- 1915: John MacDonald, Rosskeen
- 1916: Angus Mackie, Kingussie
- 1917: John Macleod, Urray
- 1918: Donald Munro, Ferintosh, Black Isle
- 1919: Donald Maclean, Free Church College
- 1920: John Macleod, Inverness
- 1921: Roderick Macleod, Knock, Isle of Lewis
- 1922: Norman Campbell, Dingwall
- 1923: George Mackay, Fearn
- 1924: Kenneth Cameron, Stornoway
- 1925: Robert Moore, Free Church College
- 1926: Alexander Stewart, Edinburgh
- 1927: Alexander Dewar, South Africa
- 1928: Archibald Donald Cameron, Creich
- 1929: John R. Mackay, Free Church College
- 1930: Robert M. Knox, Edinburgh
- 1931: Alexander Macdonald Renwick, Free Church College
- 1932: Peter Clarkson
- 1933: A. M. Ross
- 1934: Duncan MacDonald
- 1935: Alexander Ross
- 1936: Peter W. Miller
- 1937: Donald MacLean
- 1938: John MacKay MacLennan, Lairg
- 1939: Farquhar Matheson, Stoer
- 1940: William MacLeod
- 1941: John Shaw
- 1942: John Calvin MacKay, Kincardine & Croick, Sutherland
- 1943: D. MacKenzie
- 1944: Ewen MacRury, Glen Urquhart
- 1945: Roderick Alick Finlayson, Free Church College
- 1946: William Fraser
- 1947: William Campbell
- 1948: Alexander MacDonald
- 1949: G.N.M. Collins
- 1950: A. MacLeod
- 1951: Murdoch MacRae Kinloch, Isle of Lewis
- 1952: John A Macdonald, Kiltearn
- 1953: Alex R Fraser, Dumbarton
- 1954: Duncan Leitch, Dingwall
- 1955: John Morrison, Ness
- 1956: Murdoch Campbell, Resolis
- 1957: Murdoch Macphail, Croy
- 1958: William R MacKay, Kingussie
- 1959: Hugh G MacKay, Aberdeen
- 1960: Alexander Macdonald Renwick, Free Church College
- 1961: R J Murray, Killearnan and Fortrose, Black Isle
- 1962: William John Cameron, Free Church College; son of Rev Kenneth Cameron
- 1963: R C Christie, Saltcoats
- 1964: Angus Finlayson, North Tolsta
- 1965: James W Fraser, Buccleuch & Greyfriars, Edinburgh
- 1966: James Mackintosh, Colegio San Andres, Peru
- 1967: Murdo MacLeod, Tarbat
- 1968: John R Aitken, Rogart
- 1969: Clement Graham, Tain
- 1970: Murdo K Murray, Knock, Isle of Lewis
- 1971: G N M Collins, Free Church College
- 1972: Donald MacDonald, Greyfriars, Inverness
- 1973: George C Dunnett, Knockbain
- 1974: A.G. Ross, Oban
- 1975: Duncan MacLeay, Snizort
- 1976: Kenneth J Nicolson, Barvas
- 1977: William John Cameron, Free Church College
- 1978: Hugh Ferrier, Free North, Inverness
- 1979: Murdo MacRitchie, Stornoway
- 1980: Hector Cameron, Bon Accord, Aberdeen
- 1981: Donald Gillies, Lochs
- 1982: Donald Lamont, St. Columba's, Edinburgh
- 1983: John MacLeod, Point, Lewis
- 1984: Murdo A Macleod, Christian Witness to Israel
- 1985: Archibald C Boyd, Free Church College
- 1986: Angus Smith, Cross
- 1987: Fergus A J Macdonald, United Bible Societies
- 1988: John A Gillies, Partick Highland, Glasgow
- 1989: Kenneth W R Cameron, Thurso & Reay
- 1990: A Gollan, Lochcarron
- 1991: W D Graham, Southern Africa
- 1992: Donald MacDonald, Carloway
- 1993: Clement Graham, Free Church College
- 1994: Alex Murdo Macleod, Kinloch, Lewis
- 1995: Murdo A MacLeod, Stornoway
- 1996: Neil Macdonald, Fearn
- 1997: Donald M MacDonald, Bishopbriggs
- 1998: D K Macleod, Kingussie & Alvie
- 1999: K Macleod, Barvas, Isle of Lewis
- 2000: John M MacPherson, London
- 2001: W M MacKay, Peru
- 2002: J H MacLean, Kilmuir, Stenscholl & Snizort, Isle of Skye
- 2003: R G MacKay, Free North, Inverness
- 2004: Fergus A J Macdonald, United Bible Societies
- 2005: Alex J MacDonald, Buccleuch & Greyfriars, Edinburgh
- 2006: D Smith, Peru
- 2007: J S Ross, Greyfriars & Stratherrick, Inverness
- 2010: David Meredith, Smithton-Culloden
- 2011: Rev James Maciver, Knock, Isle of Lewis
- 2012: Iain D. Campbell, Point, Lewis
- 2013: Angus J. Howat
- 2014: David Miller, Cobham, Surrey
- 2015: David Robertson, Dundee
- 2016: John Nicholls, Smithon, Inverness
- 2017: Derek Lamont, St. Columba's, Edinburgh
- 2018: Angus MacRae, Dingwall & Strathpeffer
- 2019: Donnie G. MacDonald, Portree
- 2021: Neil MacMillan, Cornerstone, Morningside, Edinburgh
- 2022: Iver Martin, Edinburgh Theological Seminary
- 2023: Bob Akroyd, Edinburgh Theological Seminary
- 2024: Callum Macleod, Shawbost, Isle of Lewis
- 2025: Alasdair Macleod, Smithton-Culloden
- 2026: Calum Iain Macleod, Ferintosh and Resolis Free Church, Black Isle

=== Recent history ===
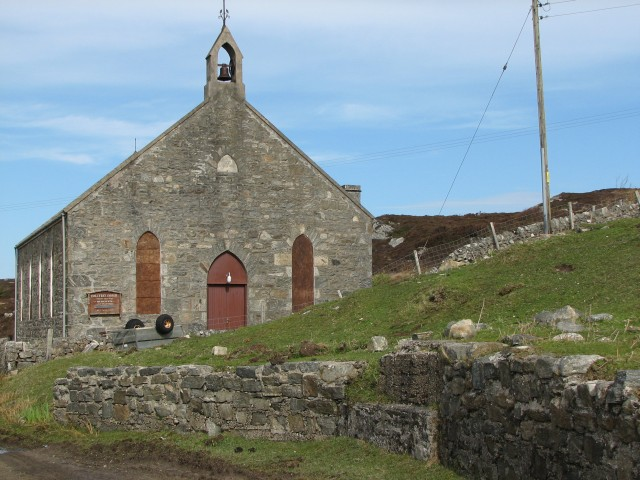
Free Church in Coll.

At the 2011 census, 10,896 people identified as being "Free Church of Scotland".

During the 2010s and 2020s, the denomination expanded its church-planting programme and received a number of congregations and ministers formerly associated with the Church of Scotland. Its recent strategy has included establishing congregations in Scottish towns and cities outside its traditional base in the Highlands and Islands.

=== Growth ===
As reported in the papers for the 2026 General Assembly, the Free Church had an average Sunday attendance of 7,796 and 6,552 communicant members. This compares with a reported attendance figure of 12,812 in 2014.

The denomination has sought to establish new congregations, particularly outside its traditional areas in the Highlands and Islands. In 2013, Murdo Murchison, an elder from Dunblane Free Church, gathered a core group to establish a congregation in Stirling. The group was recognised as a church plant in 2014, and Iain MacAskill was appointed as minister in 2016.

In 2014, North Harris Free Church and the Stornoway group of the High Free Church Stornoway joined the denomination, along with former Church of Scotland ministers. Stornoway High had previously been one of the Church of Scotland's largest congregations in the Western Isles.

In early 2015, a former Church of Scotland minister established a new Free Church congregation in west Inverness. Other congregations joining or being established during this period included a church in Leith and Christ Church, Craigentinny.

In 2015 the Covenant Church in Newmilns, East Ayrshire joined the Free Church. Covenant Church had split from the Church of Scotland in 2013. Other former Church of Scotland congregations include Abbeygreen Church in Lesmahagow, Broughty Ferry Church, Gardenstown Church, and Blackwood and Kirkmuirhill Church.

At the General Assembly of 2017, the Free Church adopted the "30x30" initiative, with the aim of establishing 30 new congregations by 2030.

Church-planting activity continued during 2025. Weekly services were launched at Leven and Leith, while Merchant City Church began public worship services in central Glasgow in September. Rev. Ben Traynor was also ordained and inducted in 2025 to lead a new church plant in the Garioch area.

The 2025 General Assembly papers listed six church plants that had become fully sanctioned charges: Grace Church Leith, Esk Valley, Haddington Community Church, Cornerstone Edinburgh, Christ Church Glasgow and Tornagrain. A further fifteen church plants had not yet attained that status.

The Free Church of Scotland website listed 111 congregations in 2024.

The Free Church of Scotland holds services in several languages, including English, Gaelic, Slovak and Spanish.

In May 2026, Rev. Calum Iain Macleod became Moderator of the General Assembly for 2026–2027. He succeeded Rev. Alasdair Macleod.

== Worship ==
=== Church services ===
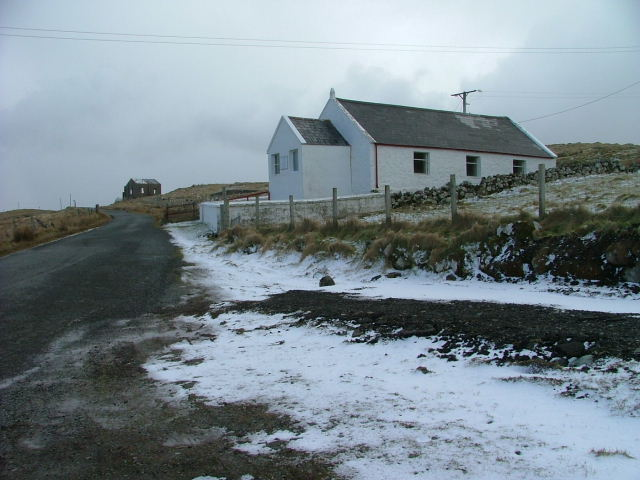
Free Church in Kilmaluag on Skye

Typically, Free Church services are at 11 am and 6 pm on Sunday Sabbath, or the Lord's Day. A typical order of service is:

- A singing of praise
- A prayer
- A second singing of praise
- A reading from the Bible
- A third singing of praise
- The sermon
- A second prayer
- A fourth singing of praise
- The benediction

Intimations may be read out before the first singing (in effect, before the actual service begins) or immediately after the reading, or before the benediction.

A 'first' reading may appear between the first singing and the first prayer. This reading will be of relevance to the 'main' reading.

A message to the children may appear after the first prayer, and children may depart for Sunday school or Bible class after the second singing. Lay preachers will replace the benediction with a short prayer.

=== Church music ===
Since just after the union of 1900 until the events of 2010, only the psalms of the Old Testament (and in a very few instances, paraphrases of other parts of the Bible) were sung during the services. Musical instruments were never used. However, in November 2010, a special plenary assembly took place to debate and vote on allowing the singing of hymns and use of musical instruments in Free Church services. The motion was passed by a narrow margin. A number of ministers insisted on recording their dissent over the decision. One congregation and four ministers resigned over the decision. The November 2010 motion allowed that instruments can be used as an accompaniment and hymns may be sung, though at least two of the items of sung praise must be psalms; some congregations continue to exclusively sing unaccompanied psalms.

In 2003 the church's Psalmody and Praise Committee produced a new Psalter called Sing Psalms. Although of a similar format to the Scottish Psalter it contains metrical versions of the psalms with 21st-century vocabulary and grammar.

== Congregations and affiliations ==
There are over 100 congregations throughout Scotland, one in London and three pastoral charges in North America. The Church has maintained an extensive missionary commitment for its size, with missions in India, Peru and South Africa, which now have self-governing status.

Along with the Evangelical Presbyterian Church in England and Wales and the Free Church of Scotland (Continuing), the denomination is one of the three members of the International Conference of Reformed Churches from Great Britain, and one of seven European Christian denominations who founded the European Conference of Reformed Churches. There is a close relationship with the Presbyterian Church of Eastern Australia.

== Bibliography ==
- Cameron, N., et al. (eds.) (1993). Dictionary of Scottish Church History and Theology. Edinburgh: T. & T. Clark. ISBN 978-0-56709-650-0. OCLC 924744646.
