= William Fraser (moderator) =

William Fraser (1851–1919) was a Free Church of Scotland minister who served as Moderator of the General Assembly in 1912.

== Life ==
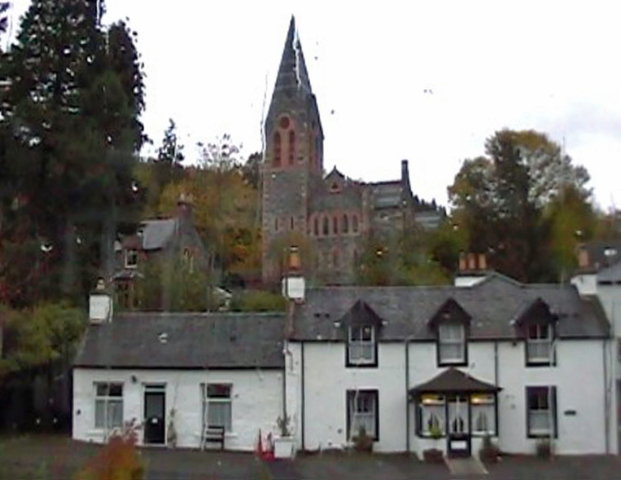
Strathpeffer Free Church

He was born in Kilmorack in Invernessshire, in 1851, the son of William Fraser, an apprentice mason, and his wife, Margaret Chisholm.

In 1881 he was living at 7 Queen Street in Inverness. His late entry into the ministry suggests he was probably occupied in another field until the age of 30. He studied Divinity at New College, Edinburgh from 1882 to 1884 and was trained as a minister for the Free Church of Scotland. His first position was as minister of Sleat on the Isle of Skye around 1885. In the Union of 1900 between the Church of Scotland and Free Church of Scotland he remained in the independent Free Church of Scotland. In 1905 he transferred to Plockton. In January 1908 he moved to Strathpeffer Free Church and remained there for the rest of his life.

In 1912 he succeeded Rev William Menzies Alexander as Moderator of the General Assembly of the Free Church of Scotland. He was succeeded in turn by Rev Samuel Lyle Orr.

He died in Strathpeffer on 7 July 1919.

Strathpeffer Free Church closed in 2014 and was put up for sale.

== Family ==
In July 1881 he married Annie Finlayson McLeay of Dingwall (1855-1933) at Arnisdale near Inverness. They had three sons and one daughter.
