= Angus MacRae =

Minister of the Free Church of Scotland

Angus MacRae (born 1967) is a minister of the Free Church of Scotland who served as Moderator of the General Assembly from May 2018 to May 2019.

== Early life ==
He was born in Glasgow in 1967 the son of Donald and Sina MacRae but was raised and educated at Laxdale on the Isle of Lewis. He attended the Nicolson Institute in Stornoway then studied Divinity at Edinburgh University in 1985, and the Free Church of Scotland College. He was raised in a Christian home, and attributes C.S. Lewis' The Lion, the Witch and the Wardrobe to playing a pivotal part in the formation of his Christian faith.

== Ministry ==
He was ordained by the Free Church of Scotland in 1992. He originally served as minister of Kilwinning and Saltcoats in Ayrshire.

In 2001 he moved north to Dingwall and served the joint parishes of Dingwall and Strathpeffer.

In October 2017 he was elected Moderator for May 2018 - May 2019 in succession to Rev Derek Lamont of St Columba's Free Church in Edinburgh. His address to the General Assembly in May 2018 was entitled "The Shalom of Jesus: Peace in a World of Rage".

MacRae served as Chair of the Board of Ministry for the Free Church and on the Board of Edinburgh Theological Seminary from 2013 to 2021. He accepted a call from Dingwall Free Church to serve as minister at the Free North Church in Bank Street, in the City of Inverness. His induction to the Free North took place in March 2020. As this took place during a national Covid-lockdown the service of induction was held online. MacRae was succeeded in Dingwall and Strathpeffer Free Church by Rev Matty Guy who was ordained and inducted to serve in that church in September 2023.

== Personal life ==
Away from work he enjoys walking, running and being outdoors, along with reading, music and cooking. He is married to Ann, a specialty doctor caring for patients with addictions. Together, the couple have three adult children and two grandchildren. His son-in-law is Rev Andrew Macleod, who is the minister of Dunfermline New City Free Church of Scotland, and formerly assistant minister of Tain and Fearn Free Church.
