= Edinburgh Theological Seminary =

Theological seminary in Scotland

- Former names: Free Church College
- Established: 1843; 183 years ago
- Principal: Iver Martin
- Location: Edinburgh, Scotland
- Colours
- Website: Edinburgh Theological Seminary

Edinburgh Theological Seminary, formerly known as the Free Church College, is a theological seminary in Edinburgh connected to the Free Church of Scotland. It traces its origins back to the foundation of New College, Edinburgh at the time of the Disruption of 1843. At the formation of the United Free Church, the United Free Church was granted the New College buildings, and so the continuing Free Church moved to new premises in 1907. It acquired its present name in 2014.

== Governance ==
According to the 2024 Acts of the Free Church of Scotland General Assembly, ETS is under the exclusive control of the Free Church of Scotland, acting through its General Assembly and appointed boards and committees.

=== Seminary Board ===
A Seminary Board, appointed by the General Assembly, oversees ETS operations, including financial management and fundraising, strategic planning, promotion of the seminary, property and facilities management, staffing decisions, and liaison with the Senate.

The Board consists of ten members, including the Principal, a Senate representative, the Chairman of the Board of Ministry, and the President of the Students' Representative Council, all ex officio. The remaining members are three Elders and three Ministers appointed by the General Assembly.

=== Senate ===
The seminary has a Senate that oversees academic governance, including curriculum, assessment, quality assurance, as well as regulating student discipline and appointing external examiners. The Senate comprises the Principal (as Chairman), Vice-Principal, Course Organizers, external members, and student representation.

== Doctrine and Academic Standards ==
The seminary is committed to the Scriptures and the Westminster Confession of Faith, aiming to maintain high academic standards comparable to universities.

Edinburgh Theological Seminary offers Bachelor of Theology and three major Master of Theology degree programmes (Master of Theology [Research], Master of Theology in Scottish Church History and Theology [Taught], and Master of Theology in Missiology [Taught]), which are validated by the University of Glasgow, provided this agreement safeguards the seminary's confessional position and the General Assembly's rights.

== Leadership and Staff ==
=== Principal ===
The Principal serves as the Chief Executive of ETS, accountable to the General Assembly through the Seminary Board. Key responsibilities include providing strategic leadership, chairing the Senate, managing academic and non-academic staff, participating in teaching, and maintaining external relations.

=== Course Organizers ===
Course Organizers (heads of departments) are appointed for specific subject areas.

=== Staff Requirements ===
The Principal and Course Organizers must be ordained ministers in the Free Church of Scotland and subscribe to the Westminster Confession of Faith. Other staff members must be office-bearers in churches that exercise biblical discipline. Course Organizers enjoy traditional academic freedom within the framework of seminary standards and curriculum.

== Centre for Mission ==
ETS includes a Centre for Mission, focusing on mission studies. Its remit includes:

- Promoting engagement with mission studies
- Fostering interaction with mission agencies and missionaries
- Providing education in mission studies to the wider Church
- Responding to requests for theological and practical training

== Students ==
While ETS primarily trains Free Church students, it also admits private students from other acceptable church backgrounds. All students are expected to profess faith in Christ and participate in the spiritual life of the seminary. A Seminary Students' Representative Council exists to represent student interests.

=== Student Body Size ===
As of 2024, the seminary had a relatively small but diverse student body. In that year:

- 13 students graduated with a Bachelor of Theology (BTh) degree
- 6 students graduated with a Master of Theology (MTh) degree

== Quality Assurance ==
A five-year review of ETS is conducted by a committee appointed by the General Assembly to ensure ongoing quality and relevance.

== People ==
=== Principals of Free Church College ===
Name	Years served
James Duff MacCulloch	1905-1926
John Macleod	1927-1942
Donald Maclean	1942-1943
John Kennedy Cameron	1943-1944
Peter Waters Miller	1945-1966
David McKenzie	1966-1973
William John Cameron	1973-1977
James Mackintosh	1977-1978
Clement Graham	1978-1988
Archibald C. Boyd	1988-1999
Donald Macleod	1999-2010
John L. Mackay	2010-2013
Iver Martin	2013-now

=== Notable faculty ===
- William Menzies Alexander
- Colin Archibald Bannatyne
- G. N. M. Collins
- Roderick A. Finlayson
- Allan Harman
- Donald Maclean
- Donald Macleod
- J. Douglas MacMillan
- Alexander Macdonald Renwick

=== Notable alumni ===
- Iain D. Campbell
- Jack Glass
- Richard McIlwaine
- Maurice Roberts
