= Free Church College =

Free Church College may refer to:

- One of the three original ministerial training institutions of the Free Church of Scotland (1843–1900):
  - Free Church College, Aberdeen, now Christ's College, Aberdeen
  - Free Church College, Edinburgh, now New College, Edinburgh
  - Free Church College, Glasgow, now Trinity College, Glasgow
- Edinburgh Theological Seminary, which was run by the Free Church of Scotland (since 1900) after the United Free Church was granted the buildings of New College.
- Free Church Training College in Glasgow, which trained teachers
- Free Church College, Halifax, now part of the Atlantic School of Theology
