= Iain D. Campbell =

Minister in the Free Church of Scotland

Iain Donald Campbell
- Born: 20 September 1963; Lewis, Scotland
- Died: 28 January 2017 (aged 53); Glasgow, Scotland
- Education: University of Glasgow; Free Church College; University of Edinburgh
- Occupations: Minister, author
- Years active: 1988–2017
- Spouse: Anne Macsween Davidson (m. 1984)
- Children: 3
- Religion: Christian (Presbyterian)
- Church: Free Church of Scotland
- Congregations served: Snizort Free Church, Skye; Back Free Church, Lewis; Point Free Church, Lewis
- Offices held: Moderator of the General Assembly of the Free Church of Scotland
- Title: Rev Dr

Iain Donald Campbell (20 September 1963 – 28 January 2017) was a minister and former Moderator in the Free Church of Scotland. He was a prolific author on a range of Biblical topics and church history. Campbell died in January 2017, and it subsequently emerged that he killed himself due to revelations surrounding having multiple extra-marital affairs with members of his congregation.

== Biography ==
Iain Donald Campbell was born on 20 September 1963 on the Isle of Lewis to John Norman Campbell and his wife Lily Maciver (née Mackenzie). Campbell had two sisters, Margaret and Alma. Campbell attended the Nicolson Institute, a school on Lewis, before studying at the University of Glasgow, where he graduated with First Class Honours in Arts in 1985. He then pursued theological studies at the Free Church College and the University of London, again graduating with First Class Honours as a Bachelor of Divinity.

He studied for a PhD at the University of Edinburgh and was awarded his doctorate in 2001. A version of his thesis, on George Adam Smith, was subsequently published in book form.

Campbell married Anne Macsween Davidson, born in 1962 and also from the Isle of Lewis, in 1984 in Stornoway. They had three children together: Iain, Stephen, and Emily.

His first pastoral position was at Snizort Free Church on Skye, which he commenced in 1988. In 1995, he moved to the Free Church at Back on the Isle of Lewis. Finally, in 2009, he became minister of Point Free Church, also on Lewis.

In 2012, he served as Moderator of the General Assembly of the Free Church of Scotland.

Campbell wrote about 17 books on topics related to Christianity, including Bible studies and doctrinal teaching, mostly published through Christian Focus Publications and Day One Publications. He also contributed to Tabletalk magazine published by Ligonier Ministries.

At the time of his death, in addition to his ministerial role, he was vice-chairman of the board of Edinburgh Theological Seminary, editor of The Record, the monthly magazine of the Free Church of Scotland, and an associate editor of Foundations, a theological journal published by Affinity. He was also an adjunct professor of Church History at Westminster Theological Seminary, helping to deliver their London-based courses.

== Death ==
Campbell died by suicide on 28 January 2017 at the age of 53, having hung himself in hospital after being admitted earlier for treatment for a suspected overdose. An early obituary, written by long-standing Free Church minister Donald Macleod, and published two days after Campbell's death, suggested Campbell was experiencing pain which may have affected the balance of his mind, but did not elaborate further.

An early report stated that Campbell's wife, Anne, had discovered emails on his computer and accused him of having several extra-marital affairs with members of his congregation. Two later stories in the Sunday Times, on 12 March 2017, presented a slightly different version of events. They stated that the initial reports were not correct and that Campbell had confessed his infidelity to his wife before taking his own life. She then found the emails on Campbell's computer.

== Published work ==
- Engaging with Keller (joint editor), Evangelical Press, 2013-07-17, ISBN 978-0-85234928-1
- The People's Theologian: Writings in Honour of Donald Macleod (joint editor), Mentor, 2011-05-20, ISBN 978-1-84550584-4
- Risking the Truth: Handling Error in the Church (contributor), Christian Focus, 2009-05-20, ISBN 978-1-84550284-3
- Pulpit Aflame: Essays in Honor of Steven J. Lawson (contributor), Reformation Heritage Books, 2016-05-01, ISBN 978-1-60178465-0
- Faith Seeking Understanding: Vital Lessons from Psalm 73, The Banner of Truth Trust, 2015–01, ISBN 978-1-84871533-2
- A Christian's Pocket Guide to Sin: The Disease and Its Cure, Christian Focus, 2015-09-20, ISBN 978-1-78191647-6
- In the Care of the Good Shepherd: Meditations on Psalm 23, Day One, 2009-09-14, ISBN 978-1-84625175-7
- I Am: Exploring the 'I am' sayings of John's Gospel, Evangelical Press, 2011-01-12, ISBN 978-0-85234774-4
- What does the Bible really say about…? The Importance of Sundays, Day One, 2015-09-30, ISBN 978-1-84625424-6
- What does the Bible really say about…? Jesus, Day One, 2016-10-01, ISBN 978-1-84625554-0
- On the first day of the week – God, The Christian, and The Sabbath, Day One, 2005-09-03, ISBN 978-1-90308795-4
- Opening up Exodus, Day One, 2006-09-03, ISBN 978-1-84625029-3
- The Wondrous Cross, Evangelical Press, 2014-03-21, ISBN 978-1-78397002-5
- The Doctrine of Sin, Mentor, 2009-05-20, ISBN 978-1-85792438-1
- Exploring the Bible: Ruth, Day One, 2010-09-03, ISBN 978-1-84625227-3
- Opening up Matthew's Gospel, Day One, 2008-10-01, ISBN 978-1-84625116-0
- The Seven Wonders of the World: The Gospel in the storyline of the Bible, Day One, 2007-08-28, ISBN 978-1-84625082-8
- Fixing the Indemnity: The Life and Work of Sir George Adam Smith (1856–1942), Send The Light, 2005-01-01, ISBN 978-1-84227228-2
- Pray, plan, prepare, preach: Establishing and Maintaining Priorities in the Ministry, Day One, 2012, ISBN 978-1-84625149-8
- The Gospel According to Ruth, Day One, 2003-03-16, ISBN 978-1-90308736-7
- Heroes and Heretics: Pivotal Moments on the 20 centuries of Church, Christian Focus, 2009-05-20, ISBN 978-1-85792925-6

Free Church titles
Preceded by Rev James MacIver	Moderator of the Free Church of Scotland; 2012	Succeeded by Rev Angus J Howat
