= James Maciver =

James Maciver (born 1954) is a Free Church of Scotland minister who served as Moderator of the General Assembly in 2011.

== Life ==
James Maciver
- Religion: Christian
- Church: Free Church of Scotland
- Ordained: September 1987
- Congregations served: East Kilbride Free Church of Scotland Knock Free Church of Scotland Stornoway Free Church of Scotland
- Offices held: Principal Clerk of the Free Church of Scotland Moderator of the Free Church of Scotland General Assembly
- Title: Rev

Reverend James Maciver was born in Stornoway, Isle of Lewis, in 1954. He was educated at Tong Primary School and The Nicolson Institute before going on to study agriculture at the North of Scotland College of Agriculture, Aberdeen, following which he worked in agricultural management near Inverurie. He began training for the Free Church of Scotland pastoral ministry at the University of Glasgow, in 1981, graduating MA, in Biblical Hebrew and Medieval History, in 1984. He then proceeded to the Free Church College (now Edinburgh Theological Seminary), graduating with a Diploma in Theology in June 1987. While at College James also obtained his Bachelor of Divinity degree, in Biblical Texts, Church History, and Christian Doctrine, from London University, graduating in June 1987.

In September 1987 James Maciver was ordained and inducted to the Free Church congregation at East Kilbride, South Lanarkshire, where he served for 10 years. In 1997 he accepted a call from the congregation of Knock Free Church (now Garrabost Free Church), in the Isle of Lewis, where he served for 19 years.

In early 2016, Maciver accepted a call from Stornoway Free Church, where he currently serves.

James is proficient in both Gaelic and English and uses both languages in his preaching and pastoral ministry.

He served as Principal Clerk to the Free Church General Assembly from 2000 to 2017 and was elected Moderator of the Free Church General Assembly in May 2011.

== Family ==
James Maciver is married to Donna Maciver and they have three children and nine grandchildren
