= James Hendry =

James or Jim Hendry may refer to:

- James Hendry (obstetrician) (1885–1945), Regius Professor of Midwifery at the University of Glasgow
- James Hendry (footballer), Scottish footballer
- James Hendry (GC) (1911–1941)
- James Hendry (moderator) (1852–1927), moderator of the General Assembly of the Free Church of Scotland, 1909
- Jim Hendry (born 1955), American baseball executive
- Jim Hendry (cyclist) (1939–2023), English cyclist
