= John Calvin MacKay =

John Calvin MacKay (1891–1986) was a Free Church of Scotland minister who served as Moderator of the General Assembly in 1942.

== Life ==
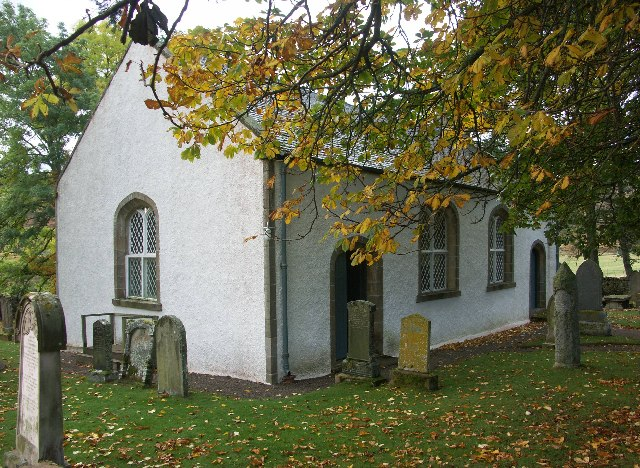
Kincardine and Criock Free Church

He studied at the University of Edinburgh graduating with an MA in 1912.

From 1921 to 1937 he worked as a missionary in Cajamarca, Peru. On his return to Scotland he was ordained at the joint parishes of Kincardine and Croick in Sutherland. In May 1942 he was elected Moderator of the General Assembly.

He died at Inverness on 21 September 1986 and was buried with his wife Mary, who predeceased him, in the churchyard of Kingussie Parish Church.

== Family ==
He married Mary Rachel MacKenzie Munro (1889-1967). Their son Angus David Hope Mackay died while a child.

== Publications ==
- The Threefold Secret of the Living Church (1942)
