= David Meredith (minister) =

Scottish minister

David Meredith is a Scottish minister who served as Moderator of the General Assembly of the Free Church of Scotland in 2010.

== Life ==
He was born in Paisley and was educated at Amochrie Primary School, Camphill High School before moving to Kensaleyre on the Isle of Skye where he completed his education at Portree High School.

He studied English and Politics at Strathclyde University before deciding to study as a minister in the Free Church. He graduated in 1984. In September 1984 he was ordained at the Smithton Church in Inverness.

He was the first minister of Smithton Church, Inverness which he served from 1984 until 2015.

He was succeeded as Moderator in 2011 by James Maciver.

In 2015 he accepted the role of Mission Director for the Free Church. This is based in Edinburgh.
