= Murdo MacKenzie (disambiguation) =

Murdo MacKenzie may refer to:

- Murdo MacKenzie (minister) (1835–1912), Scottish minister of the Free Church of Scotland
- Murdo MacKenzie (cattleman) (1850–1939), American cattle baron
- Murdo MacKenzie (sound engineer) (1913–1999), American sound engineer
