= James Hendry (moderator) =

James Hendry (sometimes shown as Henry) (1852–1927) was a Free Church of Scotland minister and missionary who served as Moderator of the General Assembly in 1909.

== Life ==
He was born in Elgin in 1852. He studied at Aberdeen University graduating MA around 1872 then studied Divinity at the Free Church College in Aberdeen. He was ordained by the Free Church of Scotland in 1878 as minister of Rothes. In 1886 he left Scotland to work as a missionary in Durban in the Natal Colony. He transferred to Kimberly in South Africa in 1889.

He returned to Scotland in 1894 and from then until death he was minister of the High (Free) Church in Forres.

In 1909 he succeeded Rev William MacKinnon as Moderator of the General Assembly of the Free Church of Scotland. He was succeeded in turn by Rev John Kennedy Cameron. Although some records mark him as minister of nearby Burghead this appears to be an error.

He died on 20 July 1927. He is buried at Cluny Hill Cemetery in Forres.

== Family ==
In 1879 he married Susan Christie (1853-1935). They had two daughters, Gertrude and Amy.
