= J. Douglas MacMillan =

- Born: 30 September 1933; Ardnamurchan
- Died: 3 August 1991 (aged 57)
- Occupations: Professor, minister, writer

J. Douglas MacMillan (30 September 1933 – 3 August 1991) was a British Christian minister in the Free Church of Scotland.

== Life ==
MacMillan was born the youngest of six children, on the Ardnamurchan peninsula in Argyll. He was converted at the age of 21, and studied at the University of Aberdeen and at the Free Church College. After his ordination, he ministered at St. Columba in Aberdeen (1966–1974) and St Vincent Street in Glasgow (1974–1982), before taking up an appointment as Professor of Church History at the Free Church College. Since 1994, the biennial MacMillan Lecture in Evangelism has been held at that institution in his honour.

According to Hywel Jones, MacMillan's preaching was marked by "powerful originality and strong orthodoxy". He is best known for his book The Lord Our Shepherd (ISBN 1850491984). This is an exposition of Psalm 23, originally given to the Evangelical Movement of Wales in 1979. MacMillan drew on his 12 years of experience as a shepherd to argue that the shepherd theme pervades the entire psalm.

MacMillan wrote a number of other books including Wrestling with God (ISBN 1850490740) consisting of addresses on the life of Jacob given to the Evangelical Movement of Wales in 1983, Jesus: Power Without Measure (ISBN 1850490910), Restoration in the Church (ISBN 1871676029) and The God of All Grace (ISBN 1857922409).

MacMillan had five children with his wife, Mary.
