= Kilmorack =

Coordinates: 57.46405°N 4.51365°W

Kilmorack: Scottish Gaelic: Cill Mhòraig
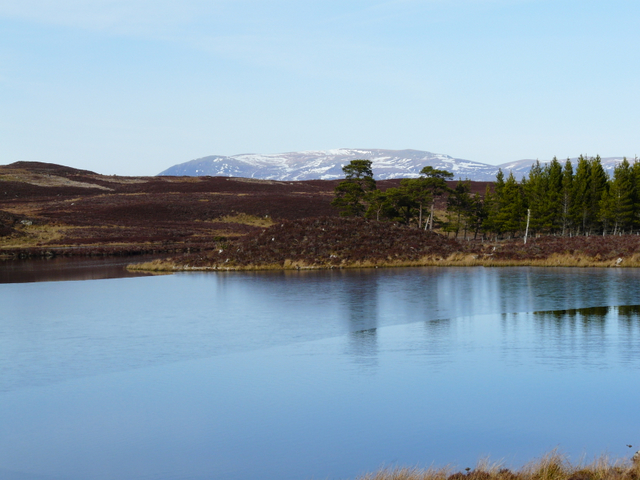
- A view of Loch nam Bonnach close to Kilmorack

- Location within the Inverness area
- OS grid reference: NH493443
- Council area: Highland
- Country: Scotland
- Sovereign state: United Kingdom
- Post town: Beauly
- Postcode district: IV4 7
- Police: Scotland
- Fire: Scottish
- Ambulance: Scottish

Kilmorack (Scottish Gaelic: Cill Mhòraig) is a small hamlet in Inverness-shire, in the Highlands of Scotland and now in the Highland Council area. It is situated on the north bank of the River Beauly, three miles (five kilometres) west of Beauly and 15 miles (24 kilometres) west of the city of Inverness. The river is part of the Affric-Beauly hydro-electric power scheme, with a dam and power station at Kilmorack. The old parish church (1786) was adapted in 1997 to show contemporary Scottish art in Kilmorack Gallery.

Kilmorack is at the centre of controversial energy industry projects by SSE and associated companies. These include an 868-acre (351-hectare) substation at Fanellan, four new 60m high pylon lines, a westcoast line, three BESS facilities and new substations for the existing hydro dams. The application by SSE for Fanellan Substation was submitted in March 2025.

== Notable people ==
- Rev William Fraser (1851–1919) Moderator of the General Assembly of the Free Church of Scotland in 1912 born and raised in Kilmorack.
