= Lord Low =

Lord Low may refer to:

- Toby Low, Baron Low (1914–2000), Conservative politician and businessman
- Colin Low, Baron Low of Dalston (born 1942), British legal scholar and crossbench peer
- Alexander Low, Lord Low (1845–1910), Scottish judge
