= Maurice Roberts (minister) =

English minister

Maurice Jonathan Roberts (born 1938) is an English Presbyterian minister.

Roberts was born in Chester and studied at Durham University and the Free Church College, Edinburgh. He was minister of Ayr Free Church from 1974 to 1994 and then at Greyfriars, Inverness until his retirement in 2010.

Roberts was instrumental in the formation of the Free Church of Scotland (Continuing) in 2000. He had been chairman of the Free Church Defence Association, which objected to the way the Free Church of Scotland had failed to discipline Professor Donald Macleod. Roberts was suspended for contumacy in June 1999 for refusing to withdraw his claim that the General Assembly in May of that year was characterised by "gross and irremediable wickedness and hypocrisy". More ministers were suspended the following year, and responded by leaving the Free Church and forming the Free Church (Continuing). Roberts served as Moderator of the General Assembly of the FCC in 2007.

Roberts was editor of The Banner of Truth magazine from 1988 to 2003. He has written a number of books: The Thought of God (1994), The Christian's High Calling (2000), Can We Know God? (2006), Great God of Wonders (2003), Union and Communion With Christ (2008), The Happiness of Heaven (2009), The Mysteries of God (2012), and Finding Peace with God: Justification Explained (2013).
