= John MacDonald (Rosskeen) =

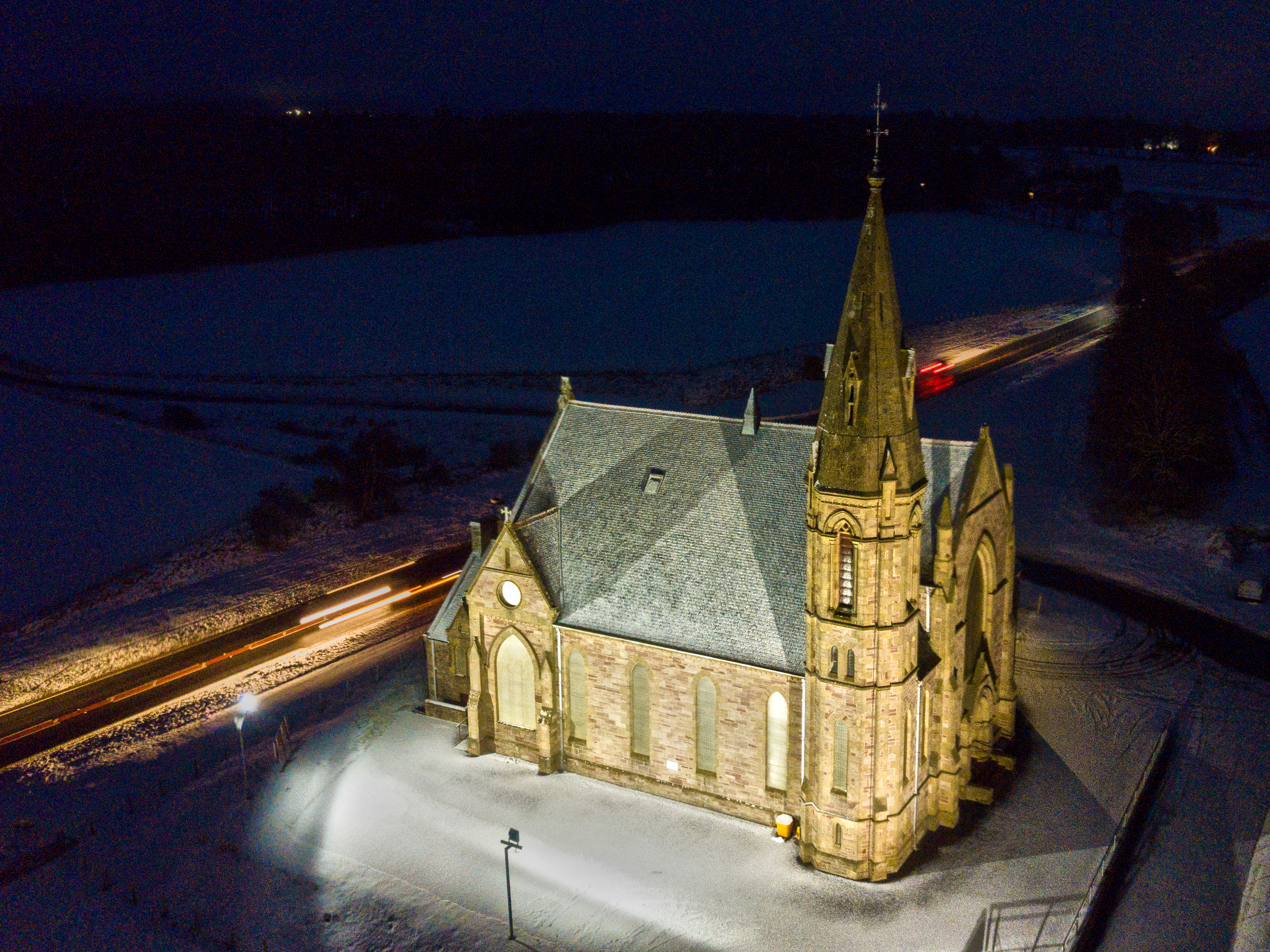
Rosskeen Free Church

John MacDonald (1860–1947) was a Free Church of Scotland Minister who served as Moderator of the General Assembly in 1915.

== Life ==
He was born in Applecross in 1860, the son of John MacDonald, a seaman, and his wife Mary. He studied at Glasgow University then at the Free Church Training College in Glasgow. He was ordained as a minister of the Free Church of Scotland at Acharacle in 1891. in 1895 he was translated to Raasay. In the Union of 1900 he remained in the Free Church. He transferred to Rosskeen in April 1908 and remained there for the rest of his life.

In 1915 he succeeded the Rev Finlay MacRae as Moderator of the General Assembly.

He died on 22 April 1947 and is buried in Rosskeen Burial Ground.

== Family ==
In September 1891, in Perth, he married Jane ("Jeannie") MacGregor (1871-1939) from Fortingall. They had several children:

- John Norman MacDonald (1895-1984) died in Camden.
- Archibald MacDonald (1897-1911) died in his teens.
- Alexander (Alastair) Roderick MacDonald (1899-1940)
- Mary Jeanie MacDonald (1902-1921) died in her teens
- Catherine MacDonald (b.1904)
- Susan Isabella MacDonald (1906-1995) married Rev Donald Mackay.
