= John Macleod (theologian) =

John Macleod (1872–1948) was a Scottish minister and Principal of the Free Church College from 1927 to 1942. He served as Moderator of the General Assembly of the Free Church of Scotland and was the author of Scottish Theology in relation to Church History.

== Divinity studies ==
Having begun divinity studies in the Free Church College, his opposition to the Declaratory Act passed by the Free Church of Scotland General Assembly in 1892 led to his continuing his studies in divinity at the Assembly's College, Belfast, the Theological College of the Presbyterian Church in Ireland, where he obtained first place in Ecclesiastical History and Biblical Criticism.

In May 1893, when the Free Church of Scotland confirmed the Declaratory Act passed by its General Assembly of 1892 to be a binding constitutional Act, which modified the Westminster Confession of Faith to which the Free Church adhered, he was one of a number of Free Church divinity students to join the Free Presbyterian Church of Scotland, which separated in Protest at this change in the constitution.

== Ministerial career ==
In 1896 he was licensed to preach the Gospel by the Northern Presbytery of the Free Presbyterian Church of Scotland. His first charge was Lochbroom, Ullapool, in Ross and Cromarty (1897-1901), where he met and married Margaret Macleod Matheson in April 1898. During this time he was appointed the Clerk of Synod, the supreme court of his church. He was translated to the congregation in Kames, Argyll (1901-1905). Towards the end of his time at Kames, he was sent as a church deputy to congregations in Canada and met the celebrated theologian B. B. Warfield during a visit to Princeton Theological Seminary in the United States of America.

== Academic career ==
On 19 Dec 1905 he was received into the Free Church of Scotland at a Commission of its General Assembly, and at the General Assembly in May 1906 he was appointed Professor of Greek and New Testament Exegesis in the Free Church College, Edinburgh.

== Marriage and children ==
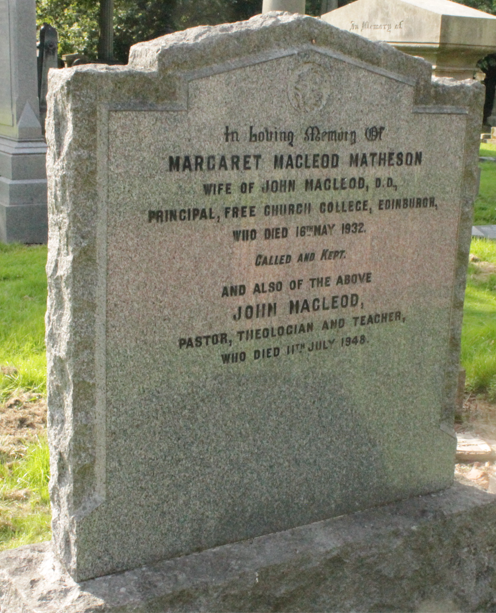
The Grave of John Macleod DD, Grange Cemetery

He married Margaret Matheson (1863-1932) on 26 April 1898, the daughter of John Matheson and Mary Macleod. He had several children.

== Death ==
He died on the morning of 11 July 1948 and was buried in The Grange cemetery, Edinburgh. The grave lies in the south-east corner of the main north-west section, facing the central path.

== Works ==
- Scottish Theology in relation to Church History, Banner of Truth Trust, Edinburgh, 1974.
- Some Favourite Books, Banner of Truth Trust, Edinburgh, 1988.
