= Bannatyne v Overtoun =

Bannatyne v Overtoun [1904] AC 515 (also called General Assembly of the Free Church of Scotland v Lord Overtoun: Macalister v Young 1904 7 F (HL) 1 and known as the Free Church case), was a protracted legal dispute between the United Free Church of Scotland (which was a union in 1900 of the majority Free Church of Scotland with the United Presbyterian Church of Scotland) and the minority of the Free Church who had remained outside of the union (see Free Church of Scotland (post 1900)).

== Facts ==
The minority of the Free Church, which had refused to join the union, quickly tested its legality. They issued a summons claiming that, in altering the principles of the Free Church, the majority had forfeited the right to its assets, which should belong to the remaining minority, who were the true ‘Free Church’. However, the case was lost in the Court of Session where Alexander Low, Lord Low (upheld by the second division) ruled that the Assembly of the original Free Church had a right, within limits, to change its position.

The Free Church was represented by their former Moderator, Very Rev Colin Bannatyne. Their position was opposed by Lord Overtoun, hence Bannatyne v Overtoun.

== Judgment ==
An appeal to House of Lords, (not delivered until 1 August 1904 due to a judicial death), reversed the Court of Session's decision (by a majority of 5–2) and found the minority was entitled to the assets of the Free Church. It was held that, by adopting new standards of doctrine (and particularly by abandoning its commitment to the establishment principle, which was held to be fundamental to the Free Church), the majority had violated the conditions on which the property of the Free Church was held.

== Significance ==
The judgement had huge implications; seemingly, it deprived the Free Church element of the U.F. Church of all assets-churches, manses, colleges, missions, and even provision for elderly clergy. It handed large amounts of property to the remnant, more than it could make effective use of. A conference, held in September 1904, between representatives of the U.F.C. and the (now distinct) Free Church to come to some working arrangement, found that no basis for agreement could be reached. A convocation of the U.F. Church, held on 15 December, decided that the union should proceed and resolved to pursue every lawful means to restore their assets. As a result, the intervention of Parliament was sought.

A parliamentary commission was appointed, consisting of Lord Elgin, Lord Kinnear and Sir Ralph Anstruther. The question of interim possession was referred to Sir John Cheyne. The commission sat in public, and after hearing both sides, issued their report in April 1905. They stated that mutual ill-feelings made their work difficult. They concluded, however, that the Free Church was in many respects unable to carry out the purposes of the trusts, which, under the ruling of the House of Lords, was a condition of their holding the property. They recommended that an executive commission should be set up by Act of Parliament, in which the whole property of the Free Church, as at the date of the union, should be vested, and which should allocate it to the United Free Church, where the Free Church was unable to carry out the trust purposes.

The Churches (Scotland) Act 1905 (5 Edw. 7. c. 12), which gave effect to these recommendations, was passed in August. The commissioners appointed were those on whose report the act was formed, plus two others. The allocation of churches and manses was a slow business, but by 1908 over 100 churches had been assigned to the Free Church. Some of the dispossessed U.F. Church congregations, most of them in the Highlands, found shelter for a time in the parish churches; but it was early decided that, in spite of objections to erecting additional church buildings, in districts where many were now standing empty, 60 new churches and manses should at once be built at a cost of about £150,000. In October 1906 the commission intimated that the Assembly Hall and the New College Buildings were to belong to the U.F. Church while the Free Church received the offices in Edinburgh and a tenement to be converted into a college, while the library was to be vested in the U. F. Church, but open to members of both. After having held its Assembly in university class-rooms for two years, and in another hall in 1905, in 1906 the U.F. Church again occupied the historic buildings of the Free Church. All the foreign missions and all the continental stations were also adjudged to the United Free Church. (Incidentally, the same act also provided for the relaxation of subscription to the Westminster Confession in the Church of Scotland; thus Parliament, had involved itself in the affairs of all Presbyterian churches.)

== See also ==
- UK administrative law
- UK constitutional law
