= Alex Murdo Macleod =

Scottish church minister (1932–1995)

Alex Murdo Macleod (Gaelic name Ailig Murchadh Macleoid) (1932– 16 October 1995) was a minister of the Free Church of Scotland who served as Moderator of the General Assembly in 1994/95.

In 1992 he helped to establish a non-denominational nursing home in Stornoway: the Bethesda Nursing Home and Hospice.

== Life ==
He was born at Ranish on the Isle of Lewis on Boxing Day 26 December 1932, the son of Murdo Macleod and his wife, Catherine Mackinnon. His mother died while he was still an infant and he and his younger brother were raised by their grandmother. He was educated locally then went to the Nicolson Institute in Stornoway.

In 1950 he was obliged to serve his National Service and served in the Fleet Air Arm. In the mid 1950s he worked for British Aluminium at Kinlochleven and then became involved in several hydro-electricity schemes in the Highlands. He then studied Economics at the West of Scotland College of Commerce and the University of London, graduating BSc. During his time as a student he attended the Partick Highland Free Church under Rev Malcolm Morrison. Mainly due this experience he felt called to a life of devotion, particularly in the Free Church of Scotland. He retrained at the Free Church College in Edinburgh graduating in 1963.

He was ordained into the parish of Kinloch on his native Isle of Lewis in 1963 where he remained all his life.

In 1994 he was elected Moderator of the General Assembly the highest position in the Free Church of Scotland.

He died on 16 October 1995 of a heart attack.

== Family ==
In 1964 he was married to Chrissie Mackenzie from Laxay and they had four children.

== Songwriting ==
He wrote the song "Creag An Fhraoich" with his friend Iain Mackay.
