= Murdoch MacQueen =

Minister of the Free Church of Scotland

Murdoch MacQueen (1848–1912) was a minister of the Free Church of Scotland who served as Moderator of the General Assembly at the end of his career in 1904/05.

== Life ==
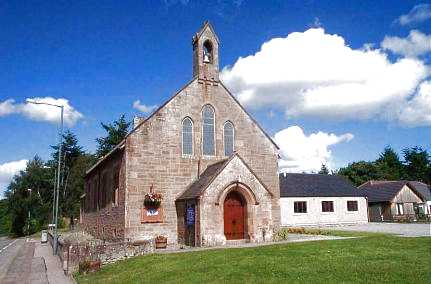
Kiltearn Church

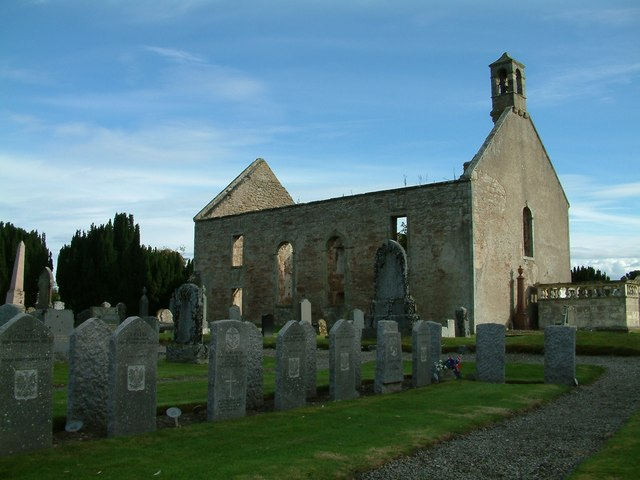
Kiltearn Churchyard

He was born on 3 May 1848 in Kilfinichen on the Isle of Mull the son of John MacQueen (later a Free Church minister) and his wife, Ann McInnes. He studied Divinity at New College, Edinburgh from 1869 to 1873. He was licensed by the Free Church in 1873 but did not find a parish until 1876, when he was ordained at Tarbet near Loch Lomond but translated to Kiltearn in 1884. The church lies close to the shores of the Cromarty Firth.

On arrival in the parish he banned dancing in the school halls.

In the Union of 1900 he remained in the Free Church of Scotland. In 1904 he succeeded Very Rev Angus Galbraith as Moderator of the General Assembly, the highest position in his church. He was succeeded in turn in 1905 by Rev Ewan Macleod of Oban.

He committed suicide in Kiltearn manse on 2 January 1912 and was buried in Kiltearn churchyard (which lies at the old and ruinous parish church), on 5 January. The grave is marked by a red granite column.

After 1929 the Kiltearn Church became part of the Free Church Continuing.
