= John MacLeod (moderator) =

Scottish minister and moderator (1926–2002)

John Norman (Jack) MacLeod (1926–2002) was a minister of the Free Church of Scotland who served as Moderator of the General Assembly 1983/84. He had the Gaelic nickname "Casan-Sofa" (sofa legs).

== Life ==
His parents had emigrated from the Isle of Lewis to America in the early 1920s and John was born in Detroit, Michigan in 1926. His parents did not fare well, nor find what they sought in America, and, mainly due to the Great Depression, they returned to the home town of his father, Am Brugan MacLeod (d.1988), at Shawbost on Lewis in 1927, and rebegan a life of crofting.

After being demobilised from war service in 1946, he decided to train for the ministry at the University of Edinburgh, then studied divinity at the Free Church College. He returned to the United States to be ordained, and his first role was as ministerial deputy at Fort William, Ontario in Canada in 1956.

In 1959, he returned to the Isle of Lewis, as minister of Park. In 1967, he returned to Canada as minister of the Free Church of Scotland in Toronto, then in 1973 went to London, before again going back to Lewis as minister Point, at which point he finally settled. In 1991, he famously led the campaign to prevent a NATO base being established at Stornoway Airport. The community and church were split in their opinions on this action.

In 1983 he was elected Moderator of the General Assembly, the highest position in the Free Church of Scotland.

He retired from the Point pastorate in 1991. He died on 8 July 2002.

== Family ==
He was married to Margaret and had two daughters and two sons.
