= G. N. M. Collins =

Scottish minister

George Norman MacLeod Collins (1901-1989) was a Scottish minister styled an "elder statesman of the Free Church of Scotland. He twice served as Moderator of the General Assembly of the Free Church of Scotland (1949 and 1971). He was also a professor of the Free Church College. He was also a prolific author, specialising in biographies.

== Life ==
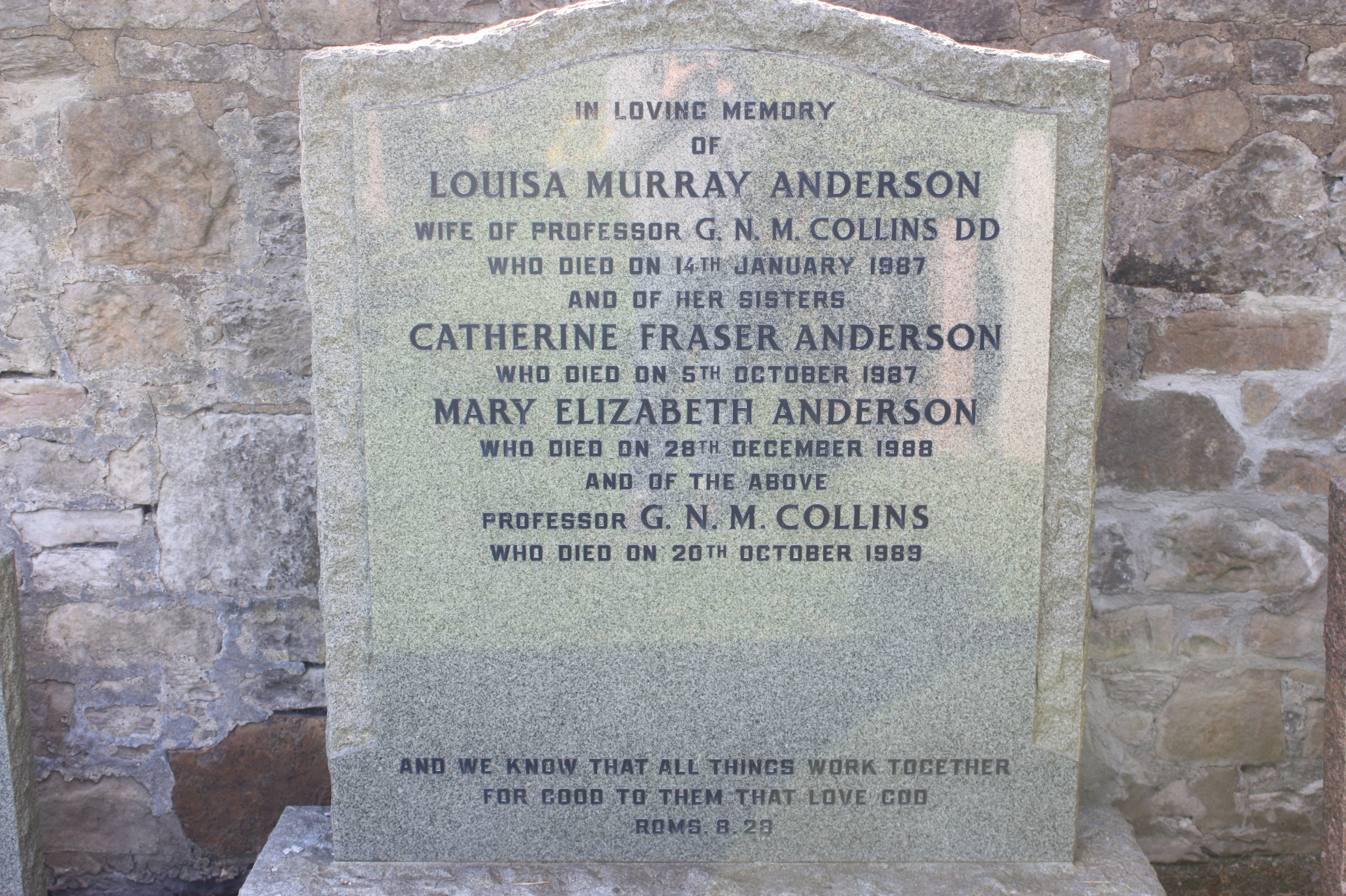
The grave of G N M Collins, Grange Cemetery, Edinburgh

He was born in London in 1901 but raised in Elphin in the Scottish Highlands, where he was indoctrinated into the ideologies of the Free Church of Scotland.

He originally trained as a journalist and then decided to join the ministry to serve the Free Church of Scotland. He was ordained in 1928 and originally served in the Free Church in Greenock. In 1938 he moved to Edinburgh. Here he served as minister of St Columbas Free Church and also began as a Professor of Theology at the Free Church College (1963-1983).

Using his journalist skills he was editor of two church newspapers; The Instructor (1937 to 1958) and the Monthly Record (1958 to 1973).

In 1952 he was joint founder (with Rev Murdoch MacRae) of the British Evangelical Council.

He died on 20 October 1989 and is buried with his wife in the Grange Cemetery in southern Edinburgh. The grave lies against the south wall of the modern west extension.

== Family ==
He was married to Louisa Murray Anderson (d.1987). They had no children.

== Publications ==
- Donald Maclean (1944)
- Principal John MacLeod (1951)
- Zechariah (1954)
- Samuel Rutherford, Saint and Statesman (1961)
- By-Paths of Scottish Church History (1965)
- The Evangelical Dictionary of Theology
- The Encyclopedia of Christianity
- Federal Theology
- The Heritage of Our Fathers (1974)
- Big MacRae (1977)
- Men of Burning Heart (1983)
- The Diary of James Morrison (1984)
- The Days and Years of My Pilgrimage (1991)
