= Murdoch MacRae =

Murdoch MacRae (1900–1961) was a Scottish minister. He served as Moderator of the General Assembly of the Free Church of Scotland in 1951.

== Life ==
He was born on 14 January 1900. He trained as a minister of the Free Church of Scotland.

He was minister of Kinloch, in the Parish of Lochs, north of Loch Eireasort on the Isle of Lewis from 1927 to 1961.

He lived at 13 Swordale in Point until his marriage then lived in Stornoway.

In 1952 he was joint founder (with G. N. M. Collins) of the British Evangelical Council.

In 1958 he was part of a delegation to the United States of America to lobby on behalf of the Harris Tweed Association to reduce import tax on imported woollen cloth.

He died on Lewis on 4 August 1961.

== Family ==
In 1929 he was married to Christina Ann Mackenzie.
