= Ewan Macleod =

Ewan Macleod (1847–1928) was a minister of the Free Church of Scotland who served as Moderator of the General Assembly in 1905/06.

== Life ==
He was born in Harris in 1847, the son of Donald Macleod, a farmer, and his wife, Catherine MacDonald. He studied divinity at New College, Edinburgh from 1872 to 1876. He was licensed to preach by the Free Presbytery of Skye in June 1876 and ordained in Duthil soon after.

In 1887 he declined an offer from Hope Street Free Church in Glasgow (the post eventually being filled by Rev James Duff MacCulloch). He turned down further in Rogart and Duke Street, Glasgow before accepting the role as minister of the Free High Kirk in Oban in January 1895. In the Union of 1900 he remained in the Free Church. During his period in Oban in 1905 he succeeded the Very Rev Murdoch MacQueen as Moderator of the General Assembly, the highest position in the Free Church. He was succeeded in turn in 1906 by Very Rev Colin Bannatyne returning for a second period as Moderator. Macleod translated to Dornoch immediately after serving as Moderator.

He retired in 1910 and died in Nairn on 26 April 1928.

== Family ==
In 1877 he married Ann Vass Lobban (1849-1916) from Duthil.

They had a son who died in infancy and two daughters: Elizabeth Macleod (b.1880) was the first missionary sent to India by the Free Church after the Union of 1900 in that she accompanied Rev Gilbert Dick to Seoni in 1905.

== Publications ==
- Free Church Psalmody
