= Roderick A. Finlayson =

Scottish minister

Roderick Alick Finlayson (1895–1989) was a Scottish minister of the Free Church of Scotland who served as Moderator of the General Assembly in 1945. In authorship he is usually R. A. Finlayson.

== Life ==
He was born in Lochcarron, Wester Ross in 1895. The son of Roderick Finlayson (1847-1895) and his wife, Christina MacLennan (1853-1944). His father died in the year of his birth.

He served in France and Flanders during the First World War. After the war he studied Divinity at the Free Church College in Edinburgh. He was ordained in 1922 and became minister of Urray on the Black Isle. From there he moved to the Hope Street (Gaelic) Free Church in Glasgow, before becoming Professor of Systematic Theology at Edinburgh in 1945. He was elected Moderator in the same year.

He was Editor of the “Free Church Monthly Record”.

He was a joint founder of the Scottish Tyndale Fellowship which evolved into the Scottish Evangelical Theological Society.

In 1945 he succeeded Rev Ewen MacRury as Moderator of the General Assembly.

In 1955 he famously protested at the Duke of Edinburgh participating in sport on a Sunday.

He retired in 1966 aged 71. His health began to fail in 1983 and he died in Edinburgh in February 1989 aged 93.

== Family ==
He was married with one son.

== Publications ==
- Reformed Theological Writings
- The Cross in the Experience of Our Lord
- Feeding on Christ
- The Holiness of God
