= A. M. Renwick =

The Reverend Alexander Macdonald Renwick
- former Moderator of the Free Church of Scotland
- Church: Free Church of Scotland
- In office: 1931
- Predecessor: Robert M. Knox
- Successor: Peter Clarkson

Personal details
- Born: Alexander Macdonald Renwick; 18 August 1888 Maol-bhuidhe, Kintail, Ross & Cromarty, Scotland
- Died: 5 February 1965 (aged 76) Lochgilphead, Argyll, Scotland
- Denomination: Presbyterian
- Parents: Halbert Renwick, Mary Macdonald

Alexander Macdonald Renwick (18 August 1888 – 5 February 1965) was a 20th century Scottish minister and theological author. He served as Moderator of the General Assembly of the Free Church of Scotland in 1931.

== Life ==
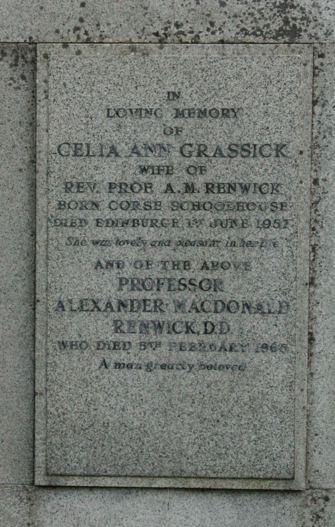
The grave of Alexander MacDonald Renwick, Grange Cemetery

Renwick was born in the isolated cottage of Maol-bhuidhe, in Kintail, Ross-shire. In March 1900 his wife is listed as living in Manchester and several sources indicate he was also from there (probably Chorlton-cum-Hardy).

In the First World War he served in the Royal Army Chaplains Department.

He was professor of theology at Edinburgh University and he was also a professor at the Free Church College on the Mound in Edinburgh.

In 1931 he was elected Moderator of the General Assembly of the Free Church of Scotland, succeeding Rev Robert M. Knox.

In 1957 at the time of his wife's death they were living at 19 Roseburn Cliff in western Edinburgh.

He died in Lochgilphead on 5 February 1965, aged 76 and is buried in the Grange Cemetery in the south of Edinburgh. The grave lies against the south wall in the south-west corner of the original cemetery near the link to the west extension.

== Family ==
He was married to Celia Ann Grassick (1883-1957) in Chorlton-cum-Hardy in November 1915.

Renwick's stepdaughter Mairi married Allan Harman, who subsequently updated and expanded Renwick's book The Story of the Church.

== Publications ==
- The Story of the Church
- The Story of the Scottish Reformation
