= Ewen MacRury =

Ewen MacRury (1891–1986) was a Free Church of Scotland minister who served as Moderator of the General Assembly in 1944.

== Life ==
He was born in 1891 one of eight children to John Little (Ewan Beag) MacRury (b.1843) and his wife, Betsy MacDonald, crofters from North Uist.

He graduated MA from Glasgow University in 1915.

He first appears as minister of the Free Church in Shiskine.

He was minister of Glen Urquhart from at least 1931.

He was a member of the Gaelic Society alongside Provost Alexander MacEwen.

In May 1944 he was elected Moderator of the General Assembly of the Free Church of Scotland. He was succeeded in 1945 by Roderick A. Finlayson.

== Family ==
He was married to Christina (Kirsty).

== Publications ==
- A Hebridean Parish (1950)
