= D. M. Macalister =

Donald Mackinnon Macalister (1832–1909) was a minister of the Free Church of Scotland who served as Moderator of the General Assembly in 1902/03.

== Life ==
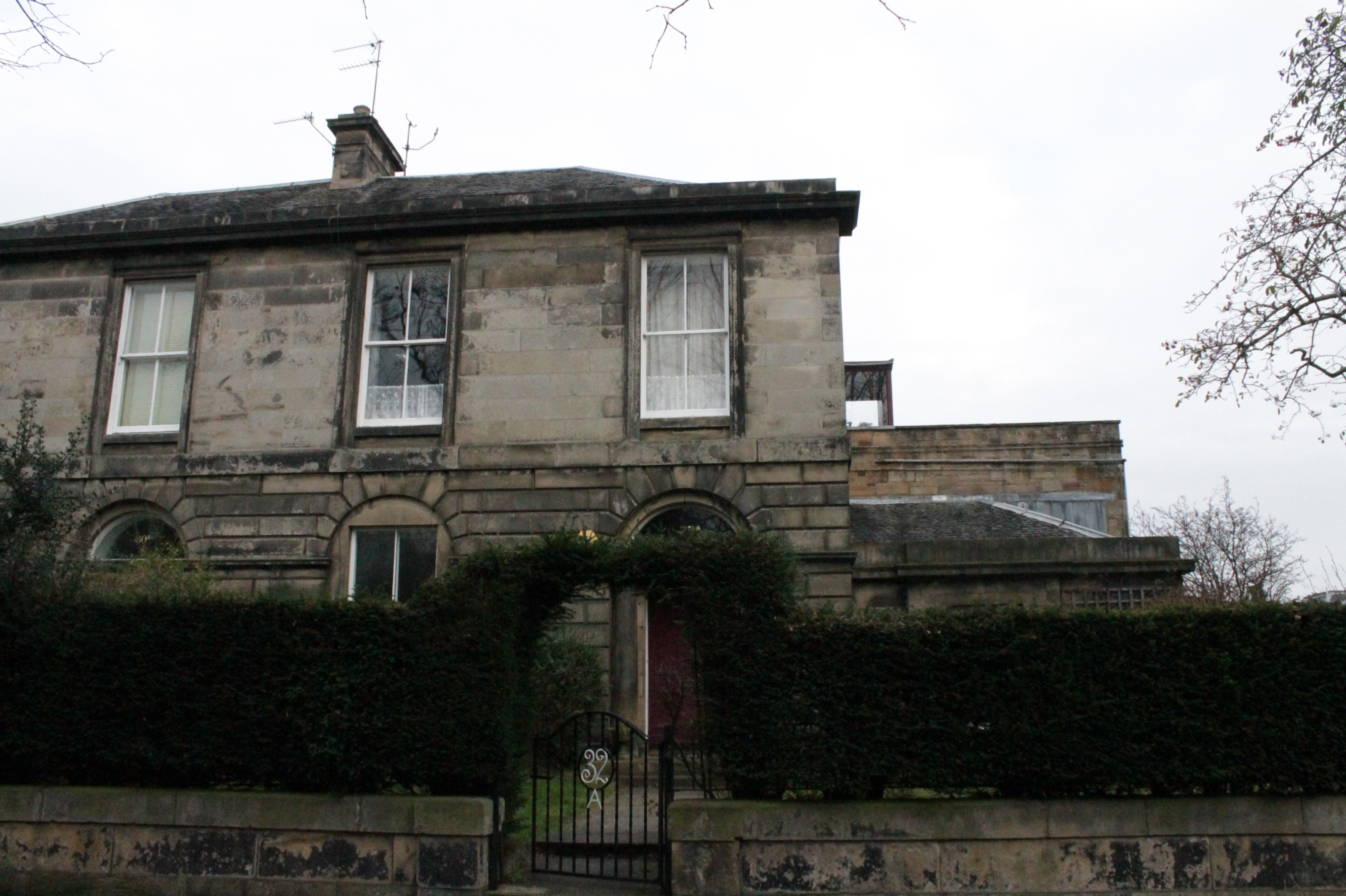
32 Mansionhouse Road, Edinburgh

He was born in 1832 in Edinburgh as the son of Rev John Macalister (1789–1844) (a Church of Scotland minister originally from the Isle of Arran, but serving in the Gaelic Church in Edinburgh), and his wife Margaret Cuthbertson, living at 4 Sylvan Place in the Grange. The family moved to Nigg in Ross and Cromarty in 1837, his father joined the Free Church of Scotland following the Disruption of 1843, and they moved to Kilbride in 1844. His father was killed in an accident later that year.

He took an initial degree at Glasgow University from 1846 then studied divinity at New College, Edinburgh, from 1850 to 1854.

He was licensed to preach by the Free Church of Scotland by the Presbytery of Glasgow in 1854. His first role was as assistant to Rev Andrew Grey of Perth. He then assisted Rev Robert Craig of Rothesay and then Rev Samuel Miller of St Matthew's Free Church in Glasgow. He was ordained as minister of Kennoway in Fife in August 1858. In 1878 he was translated to Old Machar Free Church in Aberdeen. In 1886 he moved to Greyfriars Free Church in Edinburgh, replacing Rev Archibald Smellie (1826–1886). At the Union of 1900 he remained in the Free Church.

In 1900 he was living at 32 Mansionhouse Road in the Grange district.

In 1902 he succeeded the Very Rev James Duff MacCulloch as Moderator of the General Assembly, the highest position in the Free Church of Scotland. He was succeeded in turn in 1903 by Rev Angus Galbraith.

He died in Auchterarder on 24 September 1909.

== Family ==
In August 1864 at 40 Skene Terrace in Aberdeen, he married Katharine Anne Maclagan (1839–1925) daughter of Rev James McLagan (sic) of Kinfauns, Perthshire. She died in Corstorphine in 1925.

They had eight children, mainly born in Kennoway.

== Publications ==
- Gaelic and English Sermons by the late Rev John Macalister (his father)
