= Colin Bannatyne =

Scottish minister and professor (1849–1920)

Colin Archibald Bannatyne (1849–1920) was a Scottish minister who twice served as Moderator of the General Assembly of the Free Church of Scotland both in 1900/1901 and 1906/1907.

He is the "Bannatyne" of the Free Church court case Bannatyne v Overtoun from 1904.

== Life ==
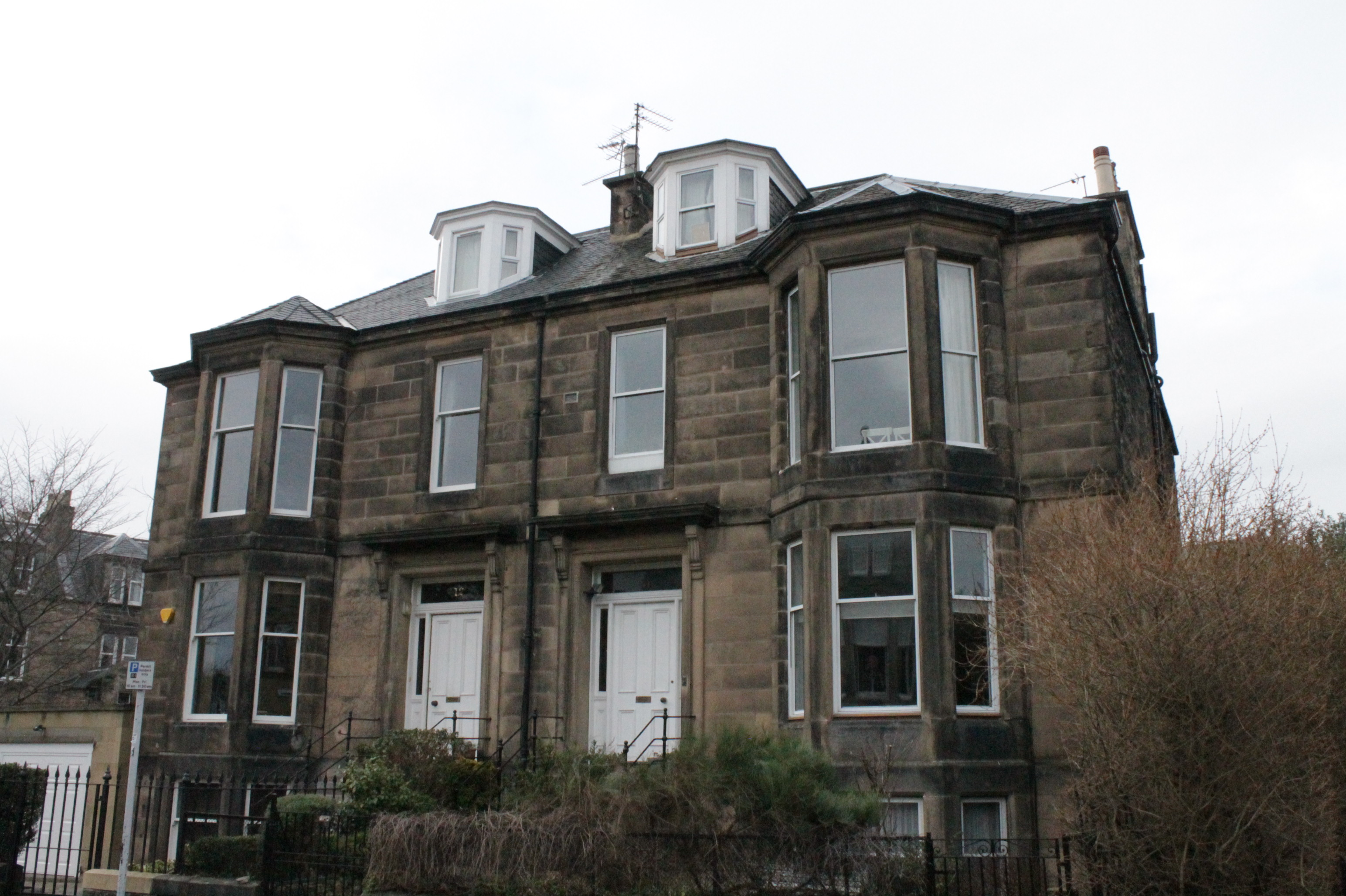
11 Brights Crescent (right)

He was born on 5 June 1849 near Oban in the parish of Kilmore and Kilbride in Argyll. He was son of Rev Archibald Bannatyne (1810–1863) and Louisa Jane Macdonald. His father had left the established Church of Scotland in the Disruption of 1843 and was one of the original ministers of the Free Church of Scotland. In 1853 the family moved to Glasgow when his father was translated to the Knox Church. The family lived at 12 Rutland Crescent.

From around 1865 he studied at the University of Edinburgh graduating with an MA in 1871. He then studied divinity at New College until 1874. He was ordained by the Free Church of Scotland at Coulter, Lanarkshire in 1876, replacing Rev James Proudfoot. At the Union of the Free Church with the Church of Scotland in 1900 he remained in the Free Church and served as their first Moderator in their reduced form. In 1905 he was appointed Professor of Church History and Principles at the Free Church College. He then moved permanently to Edinburgh, living at 11 Brights Crescent in the Blacket district.

He died in the Grange district in south Edinburgh on 22 November 1920.

== Family ==
His uncle was the Rev Ninian Bannatyne (1802–1874).

Free Church titles
Preceded by Rev Walter Ross Taylor pre-union with the United Free Church	Moderator of the Free Church of Scotland; 1900-01	Succeeded by Rev James Duff MacCulloch
Preceded by Rev Ewan Macleod	Moderator of the Free Church of Scotland; 1906-07	Succeeded by Rev Murdo MacKenzie
