= William John Cameron =

William John Cameron (1907–1990) was a Scottish minister. He twice served as Moderator of the General Assembly of the Free Church of Scotland: in 1962 and 1977.

== Life ==
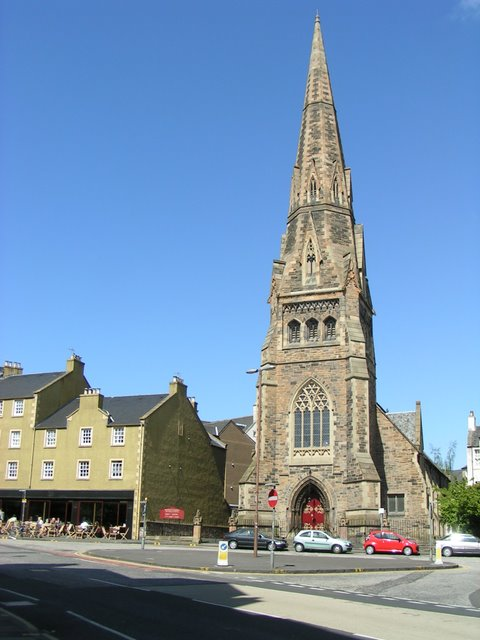
Buccleuch and Greyfriars Free Church

He was born in Brora, Sutherland in November 1907, the son of Rev Kenneth Cameron. The family moved first to Skye then to Stornoway with his father's role as minister. He was educated at the Nicolson Institute in Stornoway, where he was school dux.

He studied Classics and Divinity at the University of Edinburgh and graduated with an MA with Honours. During this period (in 1924/25) his father served as Moderator of the General Assembly.

He was ordained at Burghead on the Moray coast in 1932 and in 1950 moved to the famous Buccleuch Greyfriars Church in Edinburgh's South Side.

In 1953 he was given the Chair of both Greek and the New Testament at the Free Church College in Edinburgh. From 1973 to 1977 he was Principal of the College.

In 1962 he served his first year as Moderator. From 1963 to 1976 he was Principal Clerk to the General assembly. and in 1977 he served his second year as Moderator. During this second term he met Queen Elizabeth II during her jubilee visit to Scotland.

He died in hospital in Edinburgh on 27 January 1990, aged 82.

== Family ==
His first wife, Lilias Brown, daughter of Col. W. rounsfell Brown, died in 1968. They had one son and two daughters. In 1980 he married Murdina Smith, matron of Cameron Hospital in Fife.

His son Kenneth W. R. Cameron served as Moderator in 1989, creating three consecutive generations of the Cameron family as Moderator.
