= Finlay MacRae (moderator) =

Finlay MacRae (1857–1939) was a minister of the Free Church of Scotland who served as Moderator of the General Assembly in 1914/15.

== Life ==
He was born on 2 November 1857 in Applecross the son of Norman MacRae and Margaret MacNair. His training and early life is unclear and he probably had a different career before joining the church.

In 1892 he was ordained by the Free Church of Scotland in the church at Knockbain in Ross and Cromarty. In the Union of 1900 he remained in the Free Church of Scotland. In 1909 he was called to serve in the linked parishes of Poolewe and Aultbea but this was denied by the Assembly. In August 1911 he translated to Plockton. In 1915 he succeeded Very Rev Samuel Lyle Orr as Moderator of the General Assembly.

He died on 26 April 1939 at Glenshiel.

== Family ==
In 1930 at Rosskeen (aged 72) he married Elizabeth MacLellan, 34 years his junior. She was sister to Rev John Mackay MacLellan, a junior colleague.
