= Alexander Low, Lord Low =

Scottish lawyer and judge (1845–1910)

Alexander Low
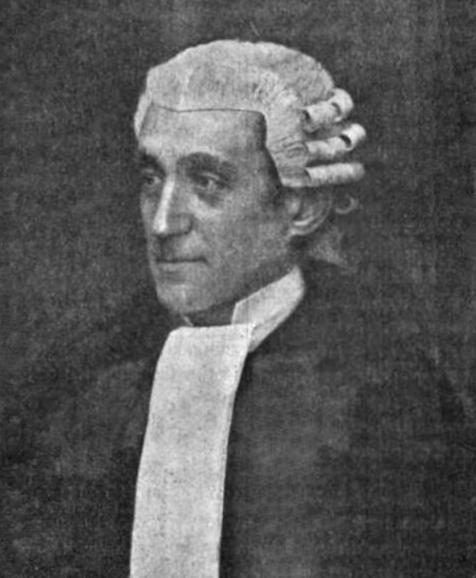
- Born: 23 October 1845; The Laws, Berwickshire, Scotland
- Died: 14 October 1910 (aged 64); The Laws, Berwickshire, Scotland
- Education: Cheltenham College; University of St Andrews; St John's College, Cambridge; University of Edinburgh
- Occupations: Lawyer, judge
- Spouse: Annie Adele Mackenzie (m. 1875)
- Children: 3

Alexander Low, Lord Low (1845–1910) was a Scottish lawyer and judge who served as a Senator of the College of Justice.

== Life ==
Alexander Low was born on 23 October 1845, the son of Jessy Turnbull of Abbey St. Bathans and her husband, James Low of The Laws, Berwickshire. He was educated at Cheltenham College then studied Moral Science at the University of St Andrews and St John's College, Cambridge. He then began a law course at the University of Edinburgh. He passed the Scottish Bar as an advocate in 1870.

In 1875 he was working as an advocate from 1 Queensferry Street in Edinburgh's West End.

In 1889 he was made Sheriff of Ross and Cromarty. In November 1890 he was elected a Senator of the College of Justice.

In 1895 he was living at 12 Drumsheugh Gardens, a fine Victorian townhouse.

He resigned on grounds of ill-health in 1904 and died at the family home of The Laws on 14 October 1910. He was buried at Whitsome churchyard.

== Cases ==
Lord Low's most noteworthy case was the Free Church of Scotland v. the United Free Church of Scotland in 1901 (formally known as Bannatyne v. Overtoun) relating to Union between the United Presbyterian Church and the Free Church of Scotland to create the United Free Church of Scotland. The case centred on the issue as to whether or not the church as a body or the congregations owned church property and echoed earlier arguments of the Disruption of 1843. Lord Low judged in favour of the United Church and the Free Church lost their property. However, this was overturned by the judicial function of the House of Lords in 1904. The matter was remedied by the Churches (Scotland) Act 1905 (5 Edw. 7. c. 12) and two subsequent royal commissions.

== Publications ==
Editor of the Scottish Law Reporter.

== Family ==
He married Annie Adele Mackenzie (1854-1925), daughter of Donald Mackenzie, Lord Mackenzie, on 23 December 1875, and they had three children.

== Artistic recognition ==
He was portrayed by Fiddes Watt.
