= Murdo MacKenzie (minister) =

Murdo MacKenzie (13 August 1835 – 26 May 1912) was a minister of the Free Church of Scotland who served as Moderator of the General Assembly in 1907/08.

== Life ==
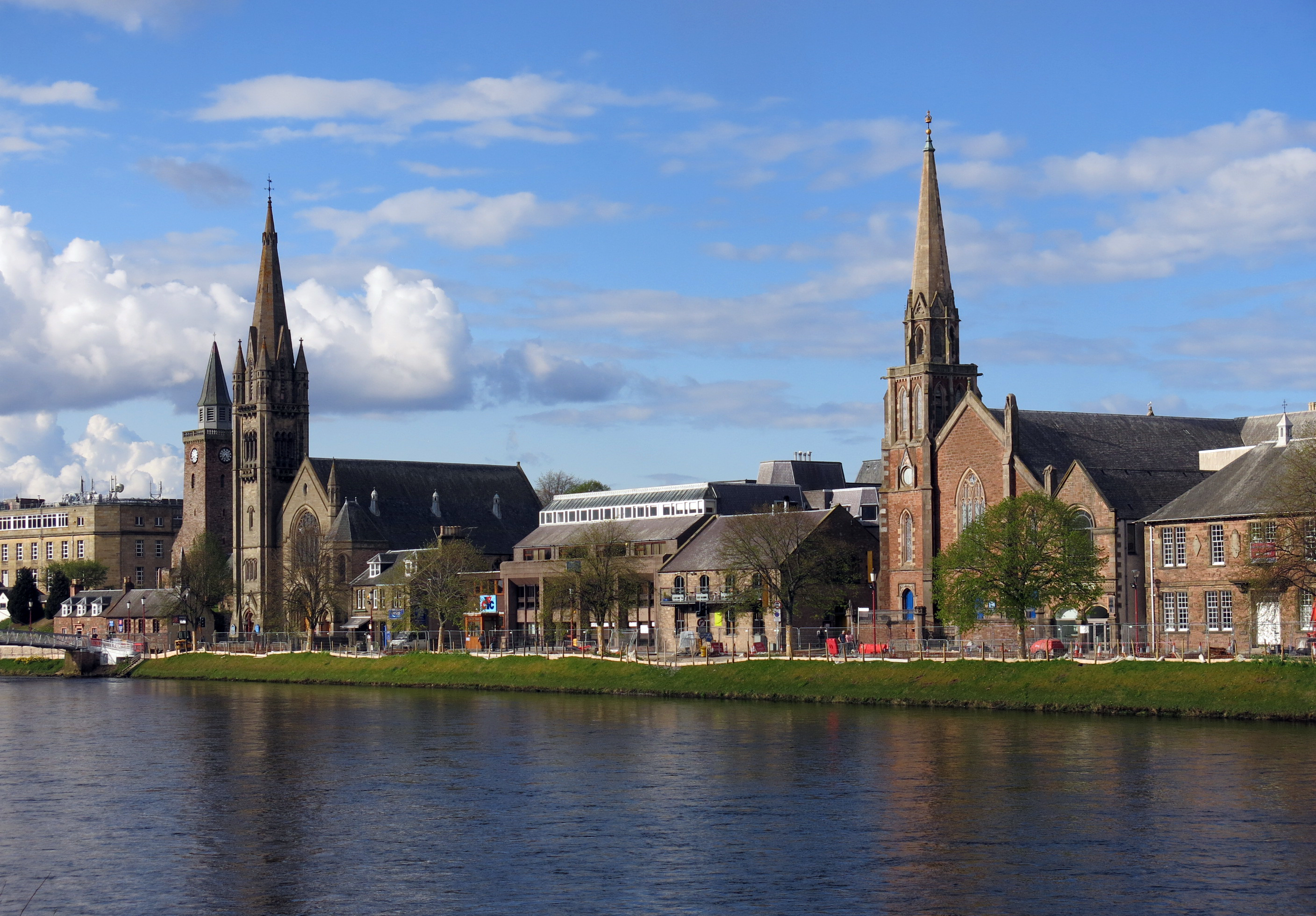
Free North Church (left) in its riverside setting in Inverness

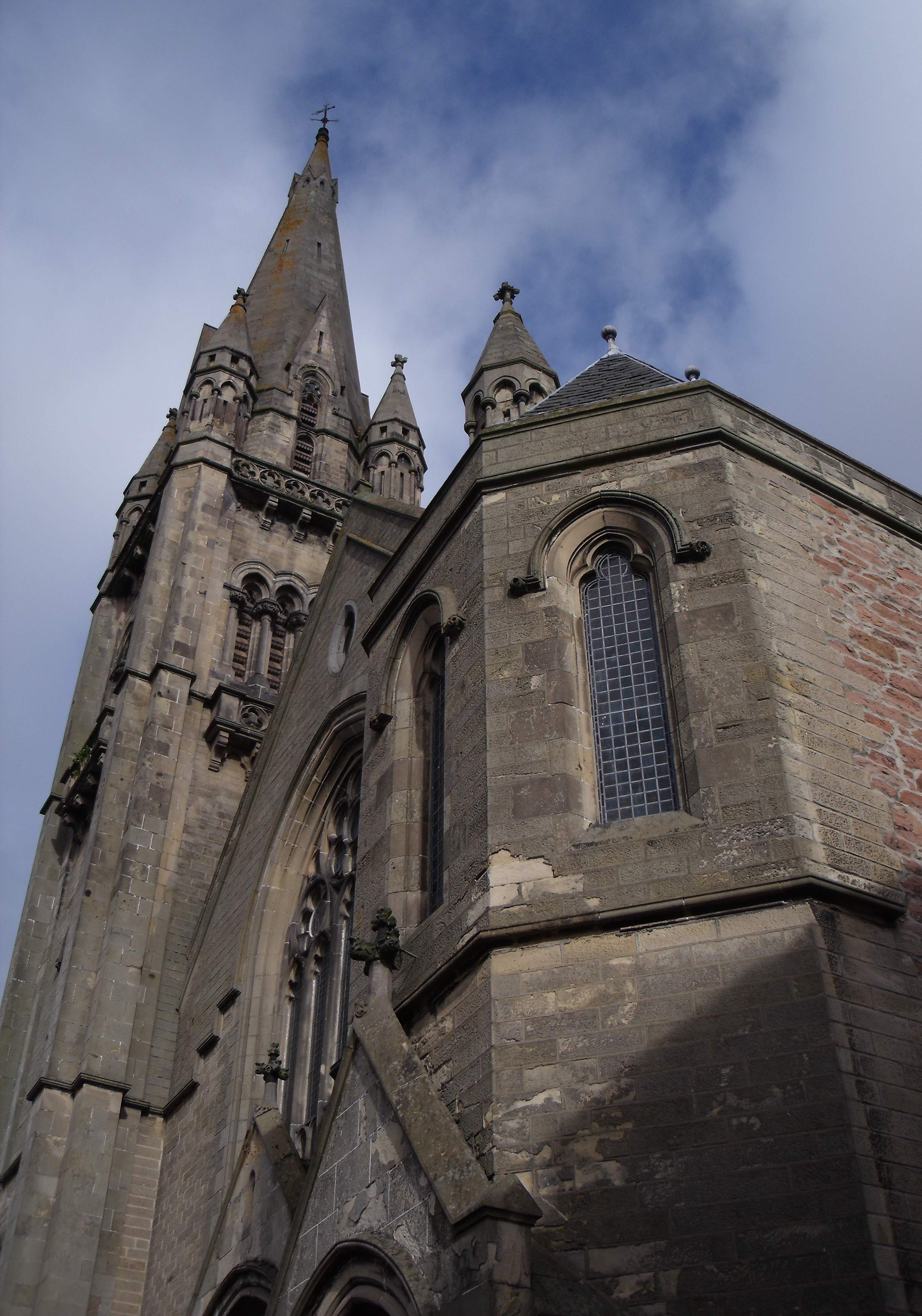
Free North Church, Inverness

He was born on 13 August 1835 at Lochcarron in Ross and Cromarty the son of Duncan Mackenzie, a farmer, and his wife, Annabella McLean. He studied at the Free church Institution in Inverness and went to Aberdeen University in 1853. He began studying Divinity at New College, Edinburgh in 1859 and completed his studies at the Free Church College in Glasgow.

He was licensed to preach by the Free Presbytery of Lochcarron in October 1863. He then had a five-year illness, during which time he resided with Alexander McColl of Duirinish on Skye. In 1870 he was ordained as minister of Kilcalmonell. In 1873 (despite some opposition from the presbytery) he translated to Kilmallie. He rejected two further calls but in September 1887 accepted a call to Inverness Free North Church, replacing Rev Dr George Mackay where he remained for the rest of his life.

The church was given a new home in 1893 to a design by Alexander Ross, and with a seating capacity of 1500 was one of the Free Church's largest churches.

In the Union of 1900 he remained in the Free Church.

In 1907 he succeeded Very Rev Colin Bannatyne as Moderator of the General Assembly, the highest position within the Free Church of Scotland. He was succeeded in turn in 1908 by Rev William MacKinnon.

He died in Inverness on 26 May 1912.

== Family ==
In Edinburgh on 26 August 1886 he married Isabella ("Ella") Stewart Shaw (b.1861) daughter of Rev Dugald Shaw of Laggan, Invernessshire.

They had four daughters and one son.
