= Donald Macleod (theologian) =

Scottish theologian (1940–2023)

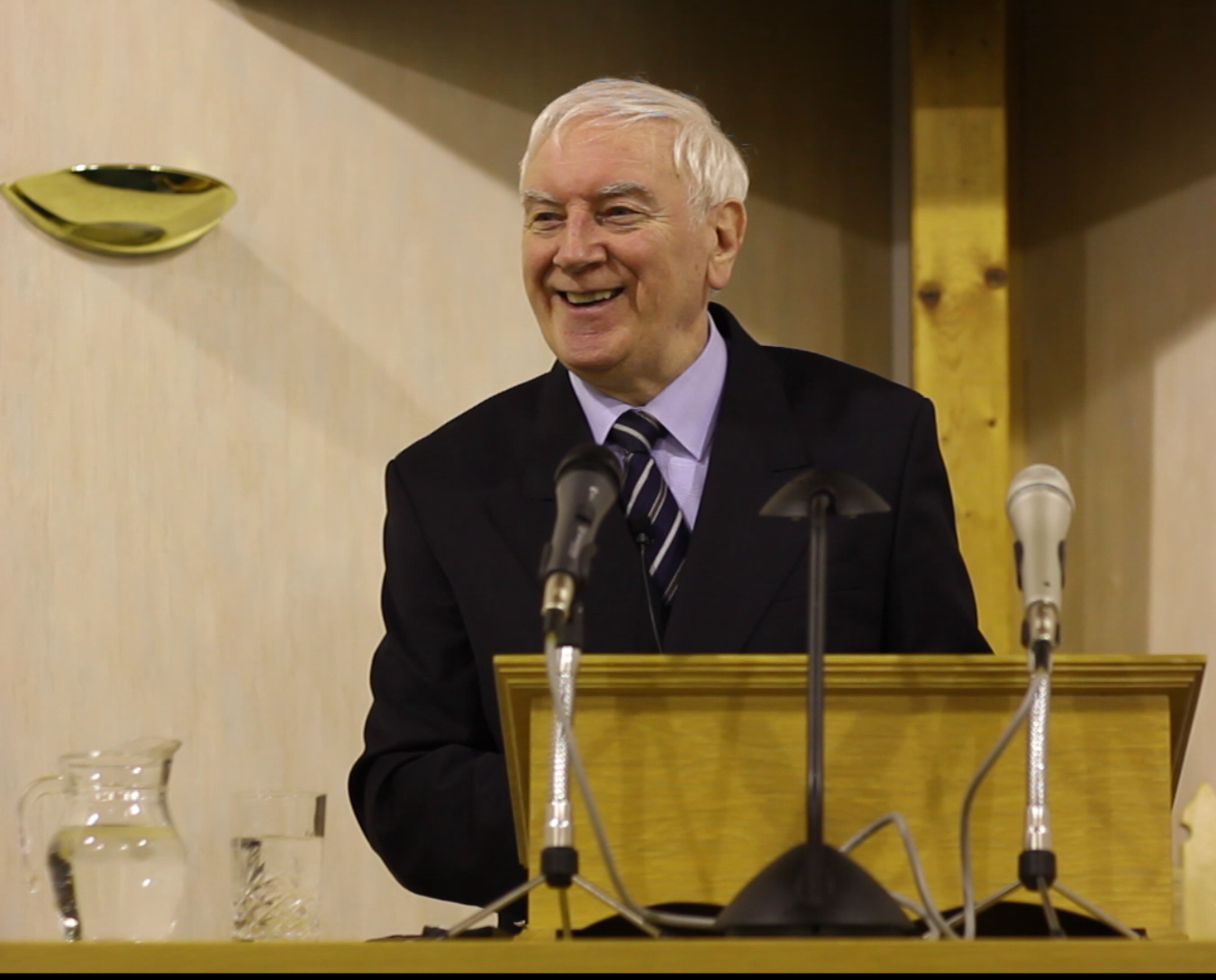
- Macleod at the 2015 "Lectures in the Faith"
- Born: 24 November 1940; Habost, Lewis
- Died: 21 May 2023 (aged 82); Edinburgh
- Education: Free Church College
- Occupations: Pastor, theologian
- Title: Rev.
- Spouse: Mary Maclean
- Children: John, Murdo, Angus
- Theological work
- Language: English, Scottish Gaelic
- Tradition or movement: Presbyterianism

Donald Macleod (24 November 1940 – 21 May 2023) was a Scottish theologian.

== Early life ==
Macleod was born on 24 November 1940 at 3 Habost, Ness. He grew up at Laxdale in Stornoway. His primary schooling was spent at Laxdale Primary School, and later attended secondary at the Nicolson Institute. He was educated at the University of Glasgow and the Free Church College before being ordained as a minister of the Free Church of Scotland in 1964.

== Free Church Ministry ==
Macleod was inducted to the ministry of Kilmallie and Arisaig Free Church on Guy Fawkes night in 1964, at the age of 22. While there, he had to hold regular worship services in various places, including Corpach, Caol, Blaich, Trislaig and Kinlochiel. After six years in that charge, he moved to Patrick Highland Free Church (now Dowanvale) in Glasgow where he served for a further eight years. There he often preached five times a week, including two services a week in Gaelic.

== Free Church College ==
He was appointed professor of systematic theology at the Free Church College (now Edinburgh Theological Seminary) in May 1978, a position he held for some 33 years. In 1996, he was considering leaving the Free Church to join the Church of Scotland, and following a new career as a writer and journalist, but remained in post and in 1999 was elected as principal of the Free Church College. He retired from that post in 2010, and as a professor in 2011. In that year, a Festschrift was published in his honour, The People's Theologian: Writings in Honour of Donald Macleod. This included contributions from Richard Gaffin, Derek Thomas, and Carl Trueman.

It is possible that Macleod's most lasting influence came through the classroom, where he taught virtually every prospective Free Church minister for decades. In 2011, his son, John Macleod, a writer and newspaper columnist, said that there were only three currently serving Free Church of Scotland ministers who hadn't studied with him.

== Journalism ==
Macleod was appointed by the General Assembly, in 1977, to be the editor of the Monthly Record, the Free Church's magazine. He continued in that position until 1990. In 1991 he began to write a column in the West Highland Free Press known as Footnotes, which he did for 24 years. The name played on his nickname: Donny Foot. He also wrote for other titles including The Banner of Truth, Reformation Today, The Observer and the Stornoway Gazette. Some of his articles were republished on his website.

== Public lectures ==
A series of public lectures was delivered at St. Vincent St Free Church in Glasgow in 1988-1989 under the title “Know the Truth”. Another doctrinal series was delivered there in the winter of 1990-1991. These, together with a 3rd series delivered at Smithton Culloden Free Church in 1991-1992, were transcribed and formed the basis of a popular book “A Faith to Live By”. The subjects of these lectures were often chapters from the Westminster Confession of Faith. From 1991 to 2015 Macleod lectured every year, usually five times, on winter Friday evenings, at Falkirk Free Church. Many of these lectures were recorded under the title “Lectures in the Faith”, the majority of which have been uploaded to YouTube and Rumble.

== Allegations ==
In 1996, Macleod was cleared of allegations that he had sexually assaulted four women between 1985 and 1991. The Sheriff court found that "the women had all lied in the witness box to further the ends of Professor Macleod's enemies in the Free Church of Scotland." Those people who believed that Macleod should be put on trial by the General Assembly then formed the Free Church Defence Association and ultimately a new denomination, the Free Church of Scotland (Continuing). However, Johnston McKay later noted that although on the surface the split was about Macleod, in his view it was about theology, since Macleod belonged to the more "modernising" wing of the Free Church.

== Personal life ==
In January 1965, he married Mary Maclean of New Shawbost. Together they had three sons, John, Murdo and Angus. His son, John, is a Scottish journalist and writer.

In 2008, he was honoured as a Doctor of Divinity by the Westminster Theological Seminary in Philadelphia, USA. Macleod was only the third Free Church of Scotland minister to win that accolade since the Second World War.

== After retirement ==
After retirement, Macleod continued to write books and lecture. He also preached communion and other services.

== Death ==
Macleod died at his home in Edinburgh on 21 May 2023, at the age of 82. His funeral was held at Stornoway Free Church on Tuesday 30 May, conducted by Rev. James Maciver. He was buried in Habost Cemetery, Ness - the township of his birth. There was also a service of prayer and praise at St Columba's Free Church in Edinburgh on Friday 26 May.

== Works ==
- The Spirit of Promise (Christian Focus, 1986)
- Rome and Canterbury: A View from Geneva (Christian Focus, 1989)
- Shared Life (Christian Focus, 1994)
- Behold Your God (Christian Focus, 1995)
- A Faith to Live By (Christian Focus, 1998)
- The Person of Christ (IVP, 1998)
- Jesus is Lord: Christology Yesterday and Today (Christian Focus, 2000)
- From Glory to Golgotha (Christian Focus, 2002)
- Priorities for the Church (Christian Focus, 2003)
- The Living Past (Acair, 2006)
- Christ Crucified: Understanding the Atonement (IVP, 2014)
- Compel Them to Come in (Christian Focus, 2020)
- Therefore the Truth I Speak: Scottish Theology 1500-1700 (Christian Focus, 2020)
- Faith Undaunted (Christian Focus, 2022)
- From the Marrow Men to the Moderates: Scottish Theology 1700–1800 (Christian Focus, 2023)
