= Samuel Lyle Orr =

Minister of the Free Church of Scotland

Samuel Lyle Orr (c. 1850 – 1930) was an Irish-born minister of the Free Church of Scotland who served as Moderator of the General Assembly in 1913/14. The Lyle Orr Awards have been granted by the Free Church of Scotland annually since 1914 to children showing great Bible knowledge.

== Life ==
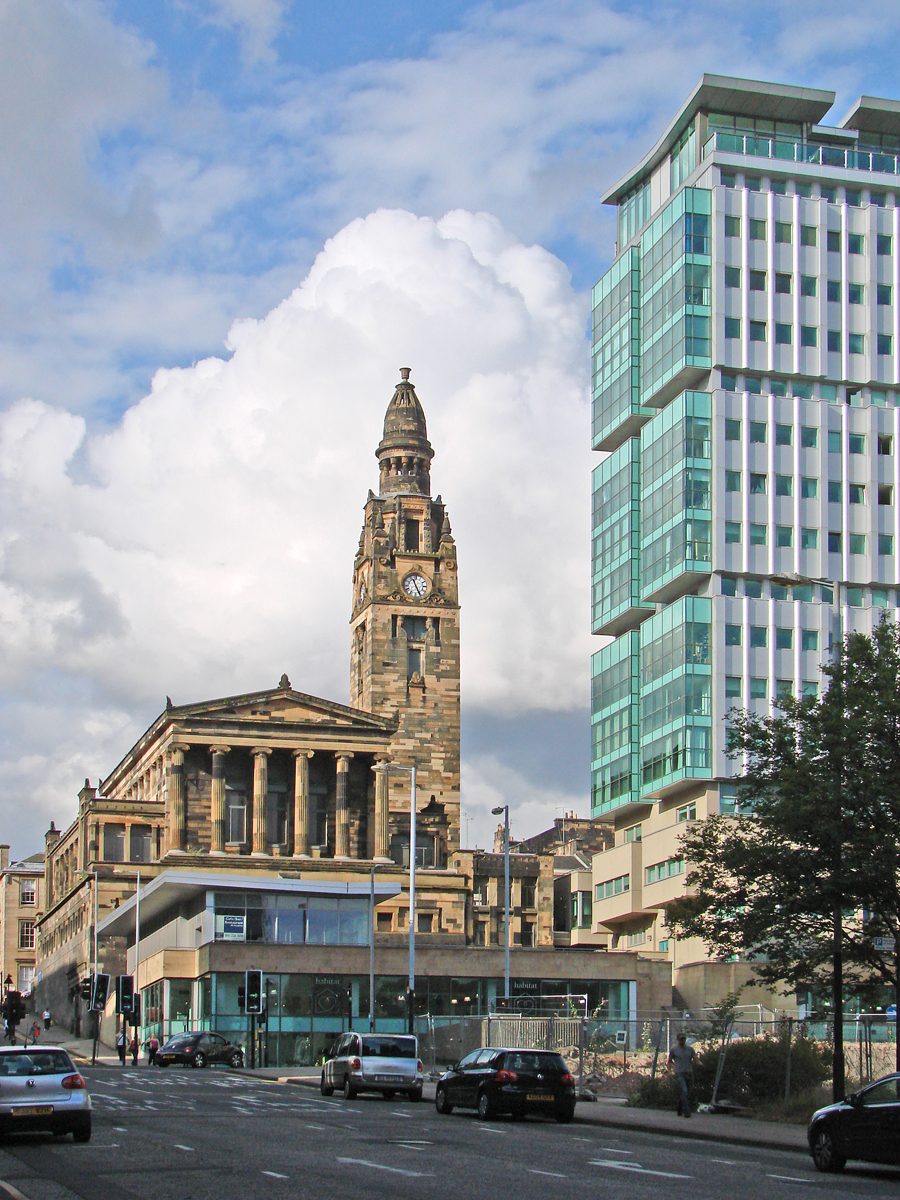
Milton Free Church (St Vincent Street Church), Glasgow

He moved from Northern Ireland to Glasgow in 1908.

He was minister of Milton Free Church in Glasgow living at 230 West Regent Street. Milton Free Church is now commonly called the St Vincent Street Church and is by the architect Greek Thomson.

In 1913 he was elected Moderator of the General Assembly, the highest position in the Free Church of Scotland. He was succeeded in 1914 by Finlay Macrae.

He died at Ballyalbany, Monaghan, on 17 January 1930.

== Family ==
His daughter Henrietta (1886–1904) is buried at Monaghan with his wife.

== Publications ==
- Historical Sketch of Ballyalbany Presbyterian Church (1940)
