= Croick =

Coordinates: 58.460°N 3.895°W

Croick: Scottish Gaelic: A'Chròic
- Village
- Location within the Sutherland area
- OS grid reference: NC895540
- Council area: Highland
- Country: Scotland
- Sovereign state: United Kingdom
- Post town: Ardgay
- Postcode district: IV24
- Police: Scotland
- Fire: Scottish
- Ambulance: Scottish

Croick (Scottish Gaelic: A' Chròic) is a small crofting hamlet, on the right bank of the River Halladale in Forsinard, eastern Sutherland, Scottish Highlands. It is in the Scottish council area of Highland.
