= John Kennedy Cameron =

Minister of the Free Church of Scotland

John Kennedy Cameron (11 May 1860–5 October 1944) was a minister of the Free Church of Scotland who served as Moderator of the General Assembly in 1910/11.

== Life ==
He was born on 11 May 1860 at Rosskeen in Ross and Cromarty the son of Janet McDonald and her husband, Alexander Cameron of Alness. He was educated at Old Aberdeen Grammar School then took a general degree at the University of Edinburgh graduating with an MA in 1885. He then embarked on a religious career studying divinity at New College, Edinburgh from 1886 to 1890.

In 1890 he was ordained by the Free Church of Scotland as minister of Kilbride on the Isle of Arran. He remained in the Free Church following the Union of 1900, but lost his church in this decision. From 1900 to 1936 he served as Clerk to the General Assembly. From 1906 he was Professor of Systematic Theology at the Free Church College.

In 1910 he succeeded Very Rev James Henry as Moderator of the General Assembly, the highest position in the Free Church of Scotland. He was succeeded in turn in 1911 by Rev William Menzies Alexander. He was then living at 34 Hartington Place in a terraced house in the Viewforth district of Edinburgh.

In 1943 he became Principal of the Free Church College.

He died suddenly on 5 October 1944 in his college rooms.

== Family ==
In 1891 at St Andrews Church in Edinburgh he married Kate McIver (b.1869) from Gairloch.

Their children included:

- Murilla McIver Cameron (1892-1984) who married Rev John Kennedy Mackenzie of the Church of Scotland
- Janet Flora Alexandra Cameron (1894-1958) who married twice, the second being Rev William MacMaster of the Church of Scotland
- Ian Kennedy Cameron (1896-1955)
- Jean MacDonald Cameron (1903 - 2002) married Dr George James Alexander MD.

== Publications ==
- The Free Church of Scotland 1843-1910 (1910)
- The Church in Arran from the Earliest Period to the Current Day (1912)
- The Scottish Church Union of 1900 (1923)
- A Proposal for a Further Ecclesiastical Union in Scotland (1930)
- The Clerkship of the General Assembly of the Free Church of Scotland (1938)
