= William Menzies Alexander =

Scottish writer (1858–1929)

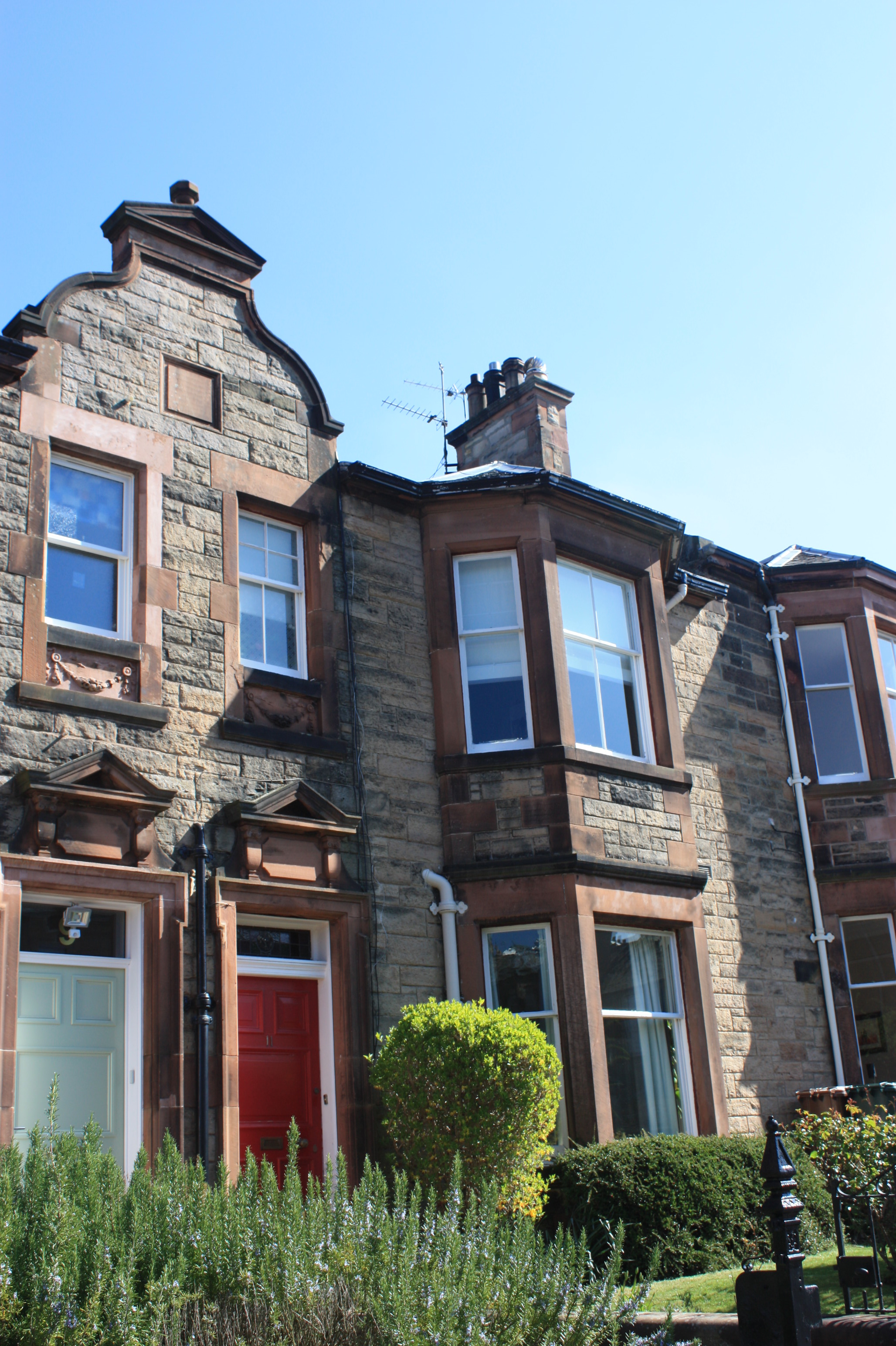
- Alexander's house at 11 St Ninians Terrace, Edinburgh
- Born: 12 May 1858; Shettleston, then in Lanarkshire
- Died: 30 August 1929 (aged 71); Edinburgh
- Occupation: Writer

William Menzies Alexander (12 May 1858 – 30 August 1929) was a Scottish medical and theological writer. He was Moderator of the General Assembly for the Free Church of Scotland from 1911 to 1912.

== Life ==
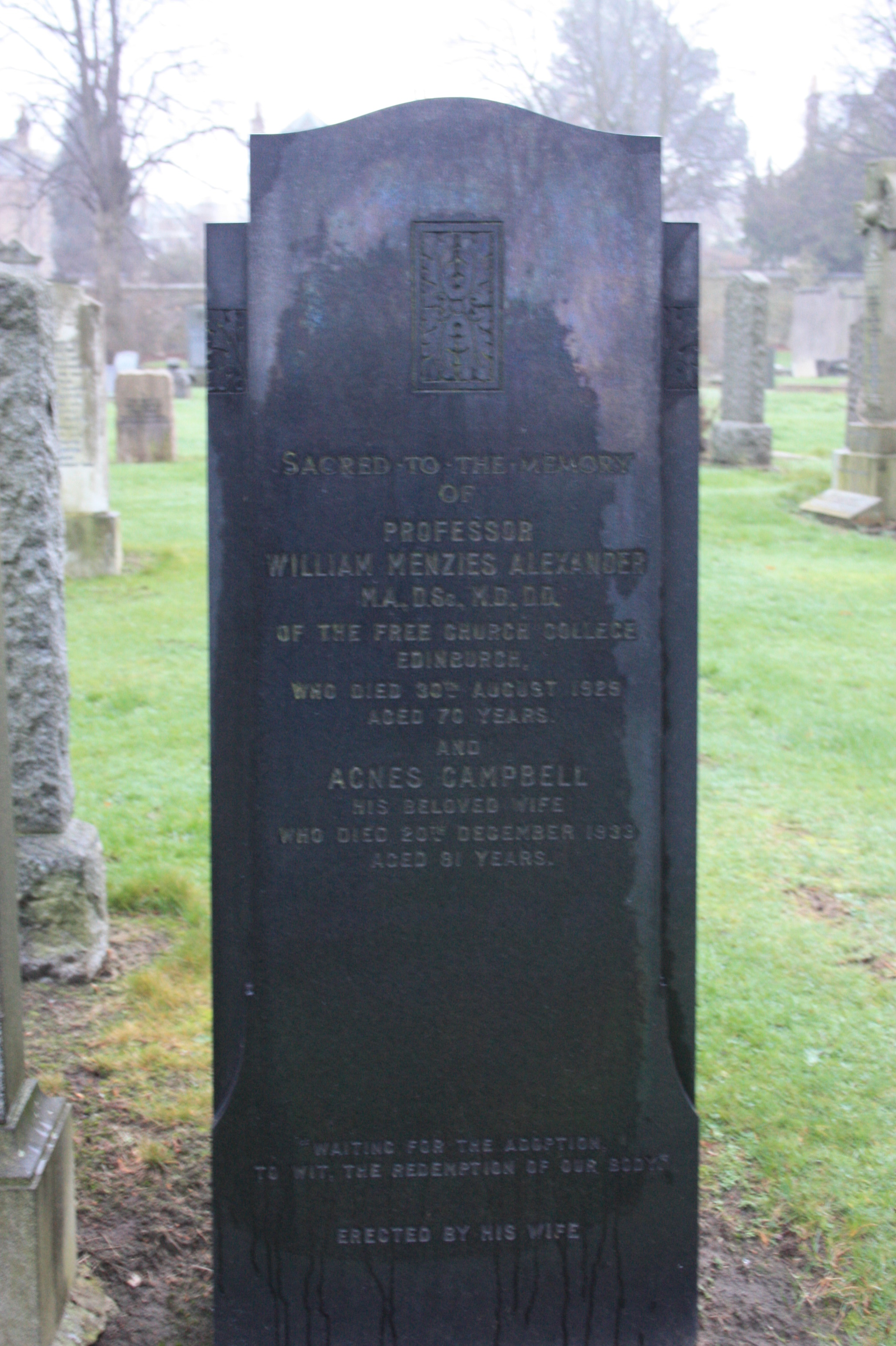
The grave of Prof William Menzies Alexander, Morningside Cemetery, Edinburgh

He was born in Shettleston on 12 May 1858, the son of John Alexander and his wife, Margaret Menzies.

After graduating B.Sc. from the University of Glasgow in 1885 Alexander trained as a medical missionary and taught biology and chemistry at Wilson College in Bombay, before returning to Scotland to complete M.B. (1888), B.D. (1889) and M.D. (1891). He then returned to Bombay where he was examiner to the Technical College and the University of Bombay until he contracted an illness that permanently damaged his hearing. He returned to Scotland and was appointed Professor of the new Free Church College in 1904, teaching most subjects in the curriculum, including Hebrew. Later, he was moderator of the General Assembly in 1911. He obtained the degree of D.Sc. in 1919.

He died in Edinburgh on 30 August 1929. He is buried nearby his home, with his wife, Agnes Campbell (1852–1933), in Morningside Cemetery, Edinburgh. His unusual polished black stone stands on an east–west path near the centre of the cemetery, towards its western end.

== Works ==
Alexander is best remembered for his work Demonic Possession in the New Testament (1902), which attempted to explain accounts of demonic possession in the synoptic Gospels in medical and scientific terms. This caused a controversy in regard to his position as Professor of Divinity at Free Church College, Edinburgh, with accusations of non-belief in the inspiration of Scripture being made against Alexander and the College. In fact, Alexander did retain belief in the miraculous, and considered that the affirmations of the possessed of the Messiah were the miraculous element, but that descriptions of the illness were simply largely the language of the day. In an address in Edinburgh in 1910 entitled "The Origin and Antiquity of Man in the light of Evolution and Scripture", Alexander laid out his reasoning for affirming special creation and rejecting what he described as the "theory of a descent of man from apes".

== Family ==
He married Agnes Campbell Blair (1857-1933) on 18 September 1889 in Glasgow, Scotland.

They lived at 11 St Ninians Terrace in south-west Morningside.

== Publications ==
- Demonic Possession in the New Testament: Its Relations Historical, Medical, and Theological (1902)
