= Angus Galbraith =

Scottish clergyman (1837–1909)

Angus Galbraith (1837–1909) was a minister of the Free Church of Scotland who served as Moderator of the General Assembly at the end of his career in 1903/04.

== Life ==
He was born in Torrisdale in Kintyre on 28 December 1837 the son of Neil Galbraith, a farm labourer, and his wife, Janet McQuilken (pronounced "McWilken"). He studied Divinity at the University of Glasgow and Free Church College in Glasgow. He was ordained by the Free Church of Scotland in 1867 on the island of Raasay. In 1890 he was translated to Ferintosh and in 1893 to Lochalsh.

In the Union of 1900 the Rev Galbraith remained in the Free Church of Scotland.

In 1903 he succeeded Donald M. Macalister as Moderator of the General Assembly, the highest position in the Free Church of Scotland. He was succeeded in turn in 1904 by Murdoch Macqueen.

He died at Ardelve on 25 April 1909. He is buried in Lochalsh.

== Family ==
. In 1876 he married Jemima Sutherland (1842-1915) daughter of James Sutherland of St Vincent in the British West Indies. They had a son, John James Galbraith (1877-1949).

== Publications ==
- Sermons of the Late Rev Angus Galbraith (1910)
