= James Duff MacCulloch =

James Duff McCulloch or MacCulloch (1836–1926) was a minister of the Free Church of Scotland who served as Moderator of the General Assembly in 1901/02.

== Life ==
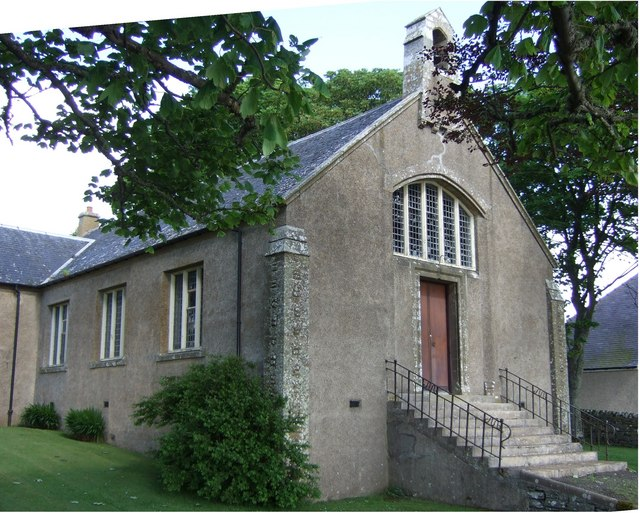
Latheron Free Church

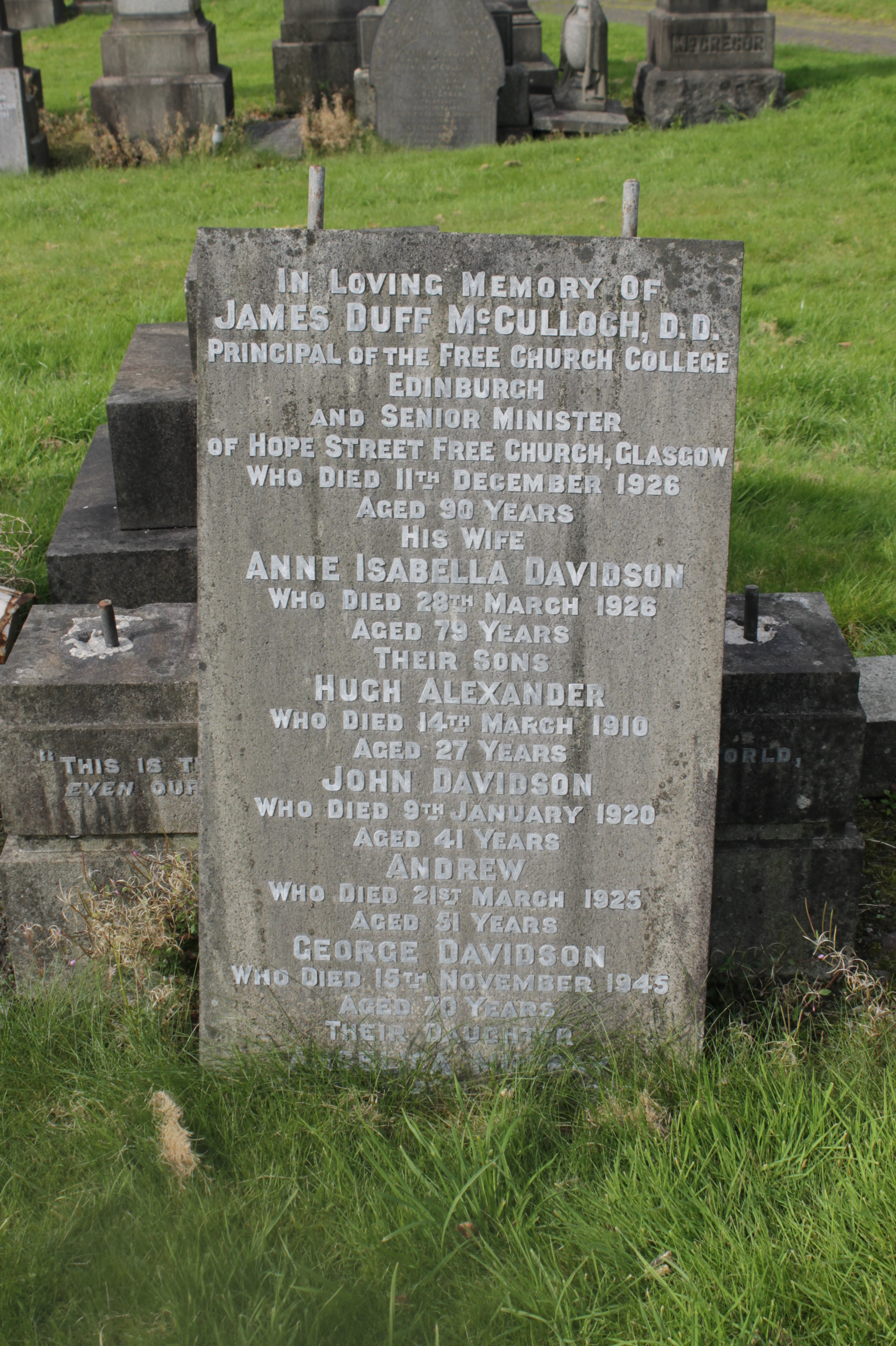
The grave of Rev James Duff McCulloch, Glasgow Necropolis

He was born on 28 April 1836 at Logie Easter in Ross and Cromarty, the son of Andrew MacCulloch. a stonemason, and his wife, Catharine Ross. He was educated at the Free Church School in Fearn and Tain Royal Academy. He then studied Divinity at New College, Edinburgh from 1862 to 1866.

He was licensed to preach by the Free Church of Scotland in 1867 and was ordained at Latheron in Caithness. From 1880 he lived at Gordons Mills. He retained these lands in later life, also leasing land at Capernich, Tighninnich and Whisky Park. He leased these properties to local workers.

In March 1889 he was translated to Hope Street Free Gaelic Church in Glasgow, a relatively prestigious church. In the Union of 1900 he remained in the Free Church of Scotland. He lived at 272 St Vincent Street in Glasgow city centre.

He served as the second Moderator of the General Assembly 1901/02 in succession to Colin Bannatyne. He was succeeded in 1902 by D. M. Macalister.

In 1905 he became principal of the Free Church College in Edinburgh whilst continuing his role at the Hope Street Church.

He retired in 1919 and returned to Glasgowl where he died in the Eastwood district on 11 December 1926. He is buried in the lower southern section of the Glasgow Necropolis. The grave has been vandalised.

== Family ==
In 1870 he married Anne Isabella Davidson (1847-1926), daughter of Rev George Davidson of Latheron.

Their children included: Angelica Murray McCulloch (1872-1947); Andrew McCulloch CA (1873-1925) who served as General Treasurer to the Free Church of Scotland and was killed in a tram accident. Their sons George Davidson McCulloch (1875-1945). Hugh McCulloch (1882-1910) John McCulloch (1878-1920) and Andrew McCulloch (1873-1925) are buried with them.
