= William MacKinnon (minister) =

Scottish minister (1843–1925)

William MacKinnon (1843–1925) was a minister of the Free Church of Scotland who served as Moderator of the General Assembly in 1908/09.

== Life ==
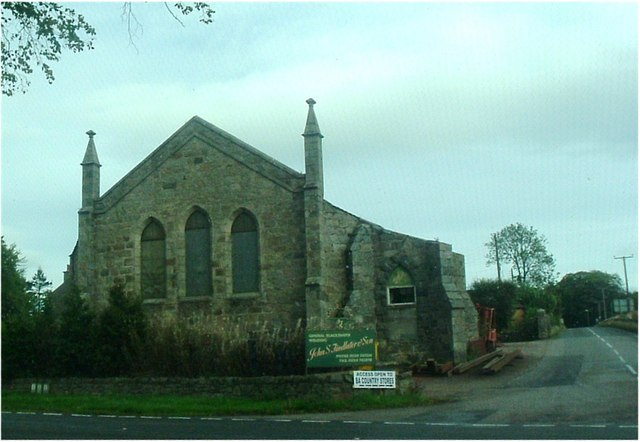
Former Gairloch Free Church - now deconsecrated)

He was born in 1843 at Strath on the Isle of Skye, the son of Lachlan MacKinnon and his wife Catherine. He was educated locally at the Free Church School.

His training as a minister is unclear but he was first ordained in Ballachulish Free Church in 1878. He translated to North Uist in 1884. He then moved to the twin parishes of Fort Augustus and Glenmoriston, and finally, in 1894, to the Gairloch Free Church.

At the Union of 1900 he remained in the Free Church of Scotland. In 1908, in succession to Rev Murdo Mackenzie, he was elected Moderator of the General Assembly, the highest position in the Free Church. In 1909 he was succeeded in turn by Rev James Henry.

He died at Gairloch on 13 February 1925. He is buried in Gairloch.

== Family ==
In 1884 at Inverness he married Marion Mackintosh, daughter of Murdoch Mackintosh, also from Strath. She died in Fort William in 1929.

== Publications ==
- Memories of Rev William MacKinnon of Gairloch compiled by Donald MacKinnon
