= Nicolson Institute =

- Àrd-sgoil MhicNeacail
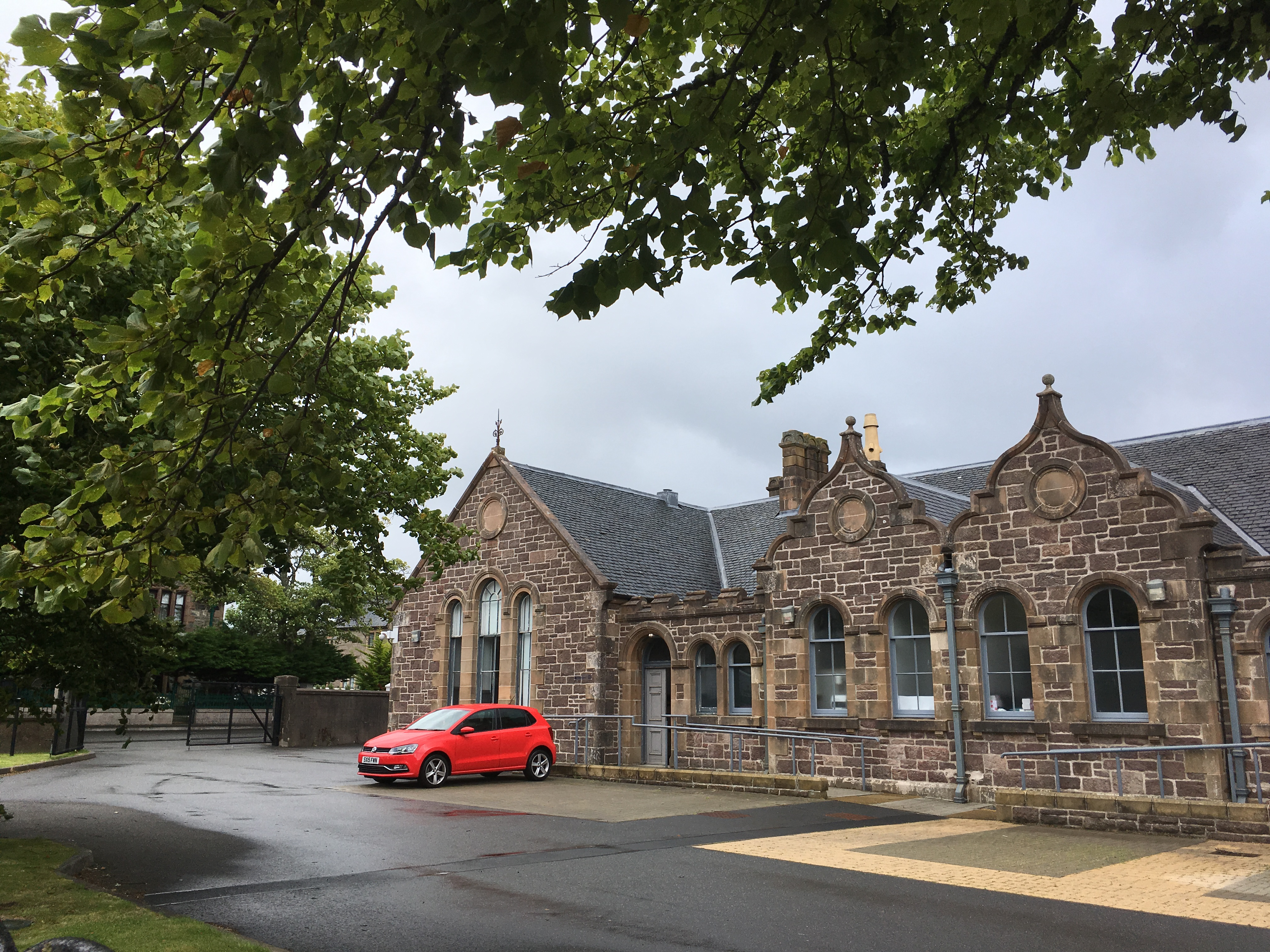

Location
- Springfield Road, Stornoway; Isle of Lewis, HS1 2PZ; Scotland; 58.211°N 6.379°W

Information
- Type: Secondary
- Established: 1873; 153 years ago
- Founder: Alexander Morrison Nicolson
- Rector: Jennifer Cairns
- Enrolment: 1,200
- Website: www.nicolsoninstitute.org

The Nicolson Institute (Gaelic: Àrd-sgoil MhicNeacail) in Stornoway, is the largest school in the Western Isles, Scotland.

The Nicolson is the only six-year secondary school in Lewis. With the Sir E. Scott School in Harris, they provide education up to Advanced Higher level.

The student population is around 1000. The school has Gaelic-speaking pupils, although these are in the minority. There are five houses, named after five significant former rectors: Addison, Forbes, Gibson, Macrae, and Sutherland. Addison contains only pupils who claim to be fluent in Gaelic.

The former rector, Frances Murray is a former dux of the school. She is the first former pupil to be appointed to the post in the school's history.

The Nicolson was re-built on the site of the original Stornoway Primary next to where the old Nicolson was. The old school comprised several different buildings, all built between 1904 (Matheson Hall) and the Main Building (1957) as well as a few other building that were demolished in the 1980s. The Main building was extended many times and a canteen was built in a second neighbouring building in the 1980s.

== New school ==
In June 2010, construction of the new school campus began. As classes were historically held across a number of buildings, the new campus intended to consolidate all subjects and facilities into a single building.

The project began with the demolition of the old Springfield South building, housing Maths and Geography, with classes moved to temporary accommodation elsewhere. The historical Springfield North building, housing Technical, was retained and linked to the new building via glazed walkway. The adjacent Matheson Hall, once housing Religious Studies, was also retained and is now used by the Comhairle. Upon opening of the new building, the old main building was demolished to make way for a new bus park and sports fields.

The project took 2 years to complete, with the new school opening to staff and pupils on the 16th of August 2012 with a total project cost of £29 million.

== Controversies ==
In 2006 the school was the site of an international custody battle after first year pupil Misbah Rana (also known as Molly Campbell) absconded to Pakistan.

In 2010, a cage/enclosure intended as a play area for a severely autistic pupil was removed, with the local authority claiming that the supplier had not understood the requirements.

The school has been at the centre of multiple bullying controversies. In 1997 two pupils were convicted after their bullying victim took her own life. In 2006 a pupil spoke out about anti-English bullying she had experienced at the school. In 2018 video of another bullying incident went viral.

In 2017 a student at the school committed suicide on school premises; his parents sued the health board for providing what they say is an inaccurate diagnosis from unsuitable tests. Eight months later another pupil committed suicide amid what was described as an 'epidemic' of mental health issues within the school.

In September 2019, a teacher at the school was charged with sexual offences.

== Notable Pupils ==
- Linda Norgrove, kidnapped by the Taliban in Afghanistan, and killed in rescue effort.
- Angus MacNeil (born 1970), Independent, Member of Parliament (MP) for Na h-Eileanan an Iar since 2005
- Anne MacKenzie (journalist) (born 1960), BBC political and current affairs presenter
- Cameron Thompson (trade unionist) (born 1998), member of UNISON's National Executive Council (2025-2027)
