= Corrimony Falls =

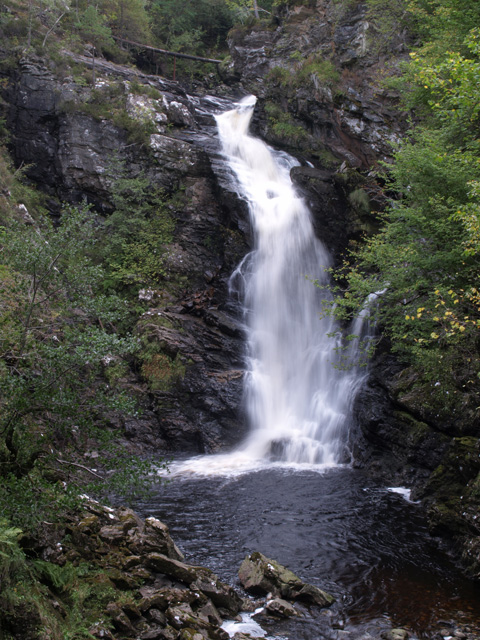
- Corrimony Falls

- Location within Scotland
- Location: Glenurquhart, Scotland
- Coordinates: 57.32424°N 4.70381°W

Corrimony Falls is a waterfall on the River Enrick, near Corrimony in Glenurquhart, in the Highland council area of Scotland. It is a local tourist attraction in the spring and summer.

== See also ==
- Waterfalls of Scotland
