= Balnain =

Village in Glen Urquhart, Scotland

Coordinates: 57.336476°N 4.586312°W

Balnain: Scottish Gaelic: Baile an Athàin
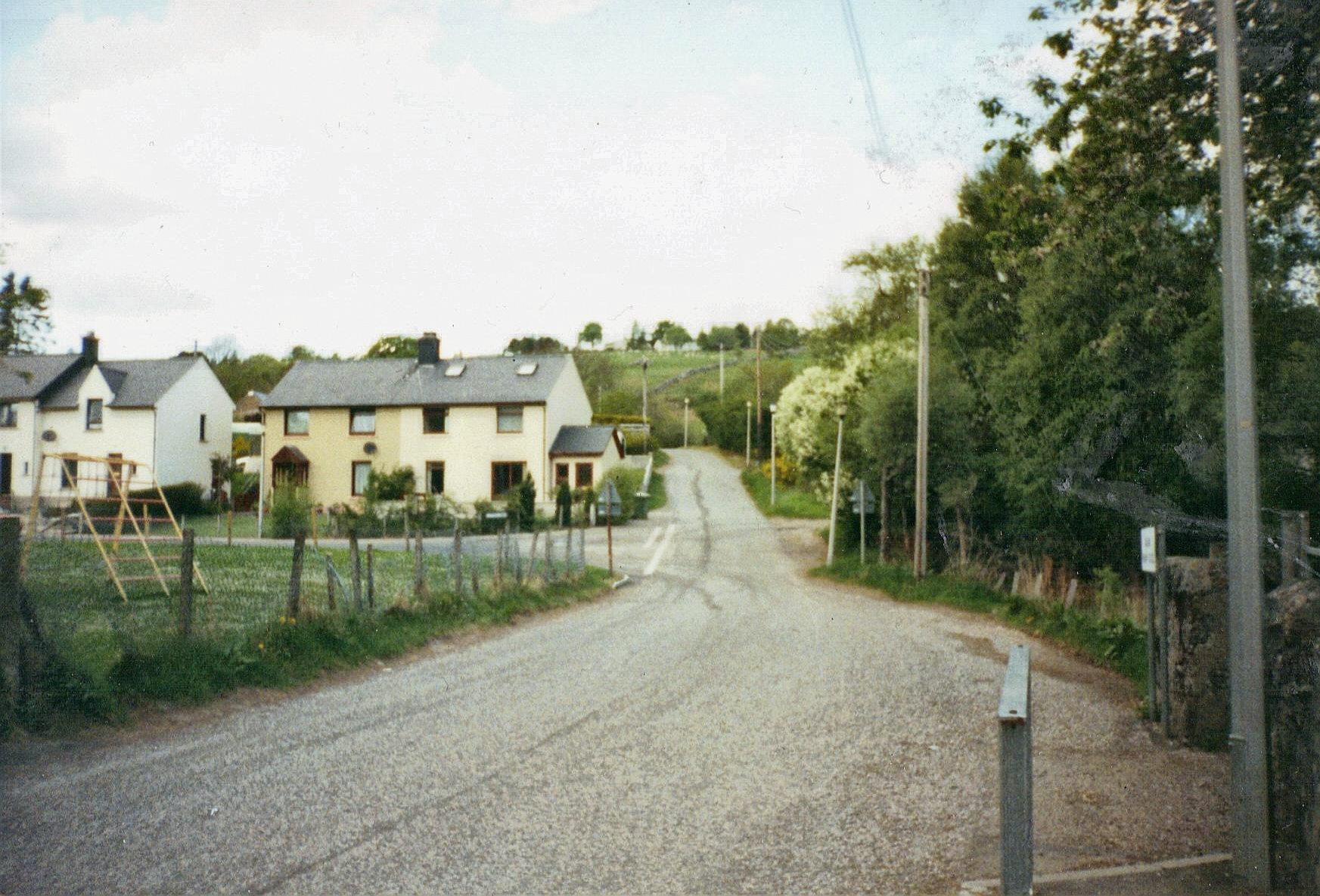
- A view of Balnain in 1999

- Location within the Inverness area
- Population: 300 (1991) estimated
- 'Under 1,000' (2011) estimated
- OS grid reference: NH433305
- Council area: Highland
- Country: Scotland
- Sovereign state: United Kingdom
- Postcode district: IV63 6
- Police: Scotland
- Fire: Scottish
- Ambulance: Scottish
- UK Parliament: Inverness, Skye and West Ross-shire

Balnain (Scottish Gaelic: Baile an Athàin) is a small village in Glen Urquhart, Scotland, about 5 miles west of Drumnadrochit. It is mostly dependent on tourism, forestry, agriculture and farming. The first buildings were created in the 1870s and 1880s and minor expansions occurred in the 1900s, 1960s and 1970. Its height above sea level is 123.6m.

== Overview ==
The River Enrick runs through from Loch Meiklie. past the village. The village also has a primary school.

Balnain is a small village in Glen Urquhart, Scotland, 5 miles west of Drumnadrochit, Scotland.

== History ==
=== Balmacaan Estate ===
Much of Glen Urquhart was part of the Balmacaan Estate (AKA: The Glen Urquhart Estate), owned by the Grant family of Seafield between 1509 and 1946. The estate It was rented to the wealthy American industrialist and local benefactor Bradley Martin late 19th and early 20th century and flourished in the 1880s and 1890s, but went into decline after the 1920s. The estate then changed hands frequently enough that the issue was raised in parliament The best forestry wood had been felled during World War 2 and the estate was dissolved in 1946. Balmacaan House, near Drumnadrochit, was abandoned soon afterwards set on fire by vandals in the 1960s and demolished in 1972.

In 1946 Bunloit Farm was separated from Balmacaan Estate and Bunloit Estate was formed around it. near the small settlement of Balbeg, located on the north west shore of Loch Ness, about 4 miles south of Drumnadrochit.

=== Origins ===
The people were originally from Balnain\Rogie near Castle Leod, 27 miles north of Loch Meiklie, in today's Torrachilty forest.

It was first mentioned in a 1610 charter as the: "fishings in the Linn of Coul, called Rogie" (NAS GD1/1149/4)

In 1681 it was in the possession of Alexander Mackenzie of Coul in 1681.

A historic quote from the mid 18th century reads:

“Our first observation has to be that when the sheep farm at Rogie came into being there was a massive clearance of people from the old township of Balnain.”

The last resident, William Macrae, appeared for the last time in the 1947/1948 Valuation Rolls.

Its ruins are now referred to as Rogie or Rogg and are a listed archeological site.

=== The village ===
Much of Glen Urquhart, was part of the Balmacaan Estate owned by the Grant family of Seafield between 1509 and 1946 The estate flourished in the 1880s and 1890s, but went in to decline after the 1920s. The best wood had been felled during World War 2 and the estate was dissolved in 1946. Balmacaan House, near Drumnadrochit, was abandoned soon afterwards, set on fire by vandals in the 1960s and demolished in 1972.

Glen Urquhart used to be part of the lands of the Grants of Glenmorison, with the lands of the Frasers to the north for most of its time. The Fraser family of Balnain, Scotland, supported Bonnie Prince Charlie., but came from a township of the same name, in Stratherrick on the other side of Loch Ness.

It was called Lochlater the mid 1700s, after Loch Meiklie's old name of Loch Later.

Balnain had yet to exist by 1832, other than just the near by house of Lakefield and Lochlater had also ceased to be by that date. Loch Meiklie was also known as Loch Loitter at this time and possibly the nomenclatural origin of the near by settlement of Lochletter, Lochletter House and Lochletter forest. The River Enrick was known as Endrie Water at this time.

Several buildings were erected during 1872, appearing on some maps, but not others.

Hazlebrea House, Lochletter House, 9 Balnain houses, a barn and the smithy were there in 1878 and 1896.

The primary school is of a Victorian origin and appeared in 1898 as an ordinary building, but became a school by 1908.

Sraid-Na-Firrin (street) was built in the mid 1970s.

== Climate ==
Like most of the United Kingdom, the Inverness area has an oceanic climate (Köppen: Cfb).

The weather in the village is generally warm and sunny in the spring and summer, cool and fairly rainy in the autumn, and very cold and snowy with some blizzards in the winter.

== Local amenities ==
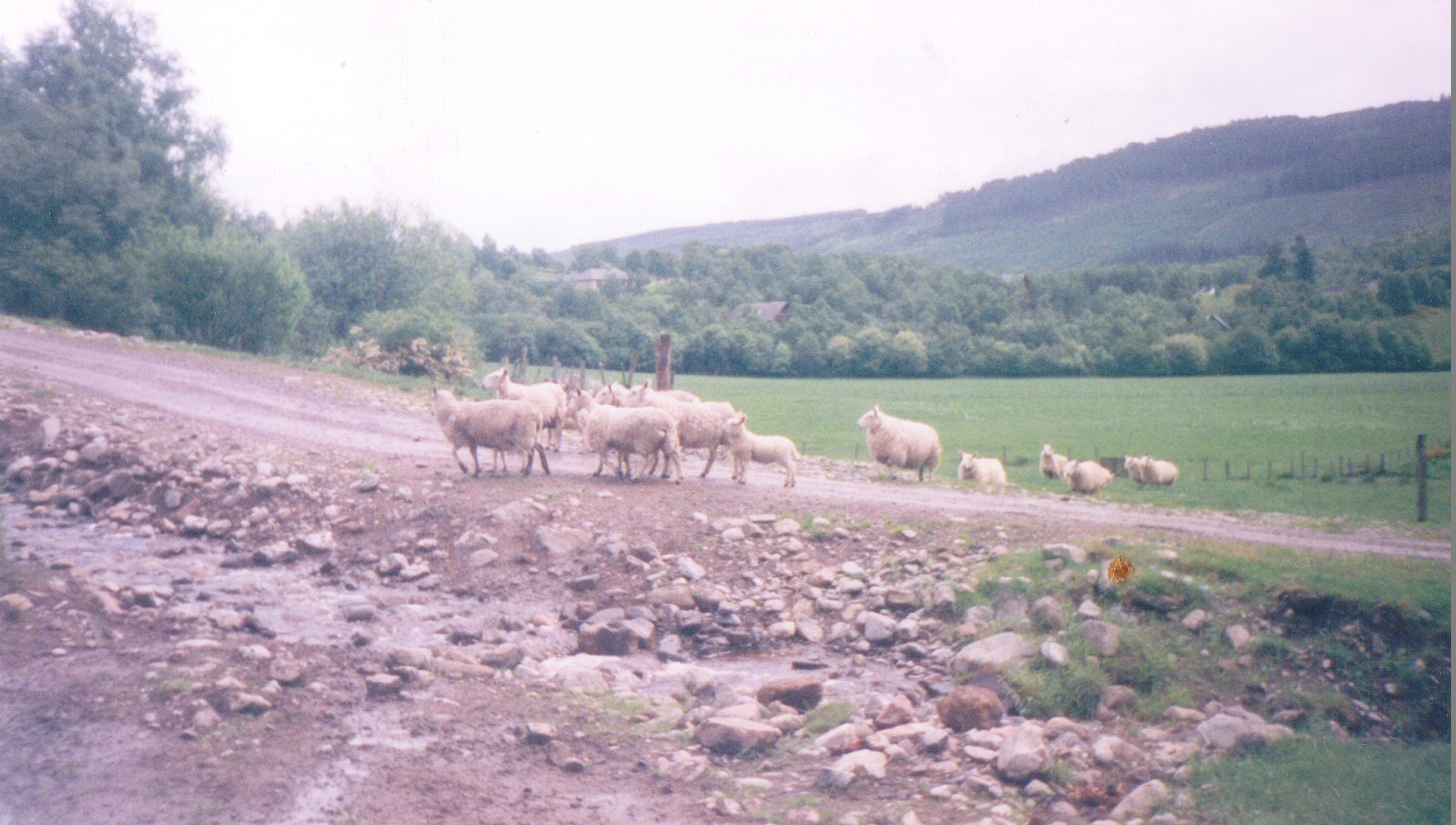
Sheep in Balnain in 1989.

The annual Snowman Car Rally has passed through the town since 1998.

Recreational areas and parks

Balnain-park is a play park.

Balnain bike park

The Forestry Commission closed the 2-year-old Bike-park and general access to cross-country cyclists in 2011, but walkers can still enjoy the scenery.

== Primary school ==
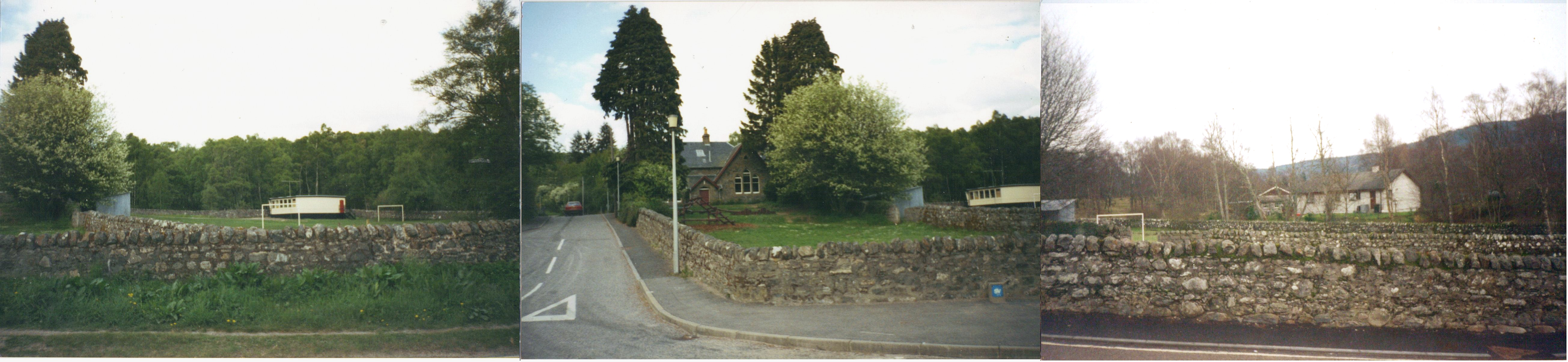
A picture of Balnain primary school in 1998.

It is a non-denominational, mixed sex school, with 37 pupils in 2012, but this was reduced to 35 pupils in as of 2013.

The main school building was built in circa 1880. The school did well in its 2006 and 2008 Ofsted reports. The leaky roof was fixed in 2008 after an Ofsted report commented on it 2 years earlier.

The age bracket was 4 to 12 up to 2012. The top age was cut from 12 to 11 during 2012. The schools age bracket was redefined as 3 to 12 years old by 2021.

== Transport ==
There was an occasional weekday bus service to Inverness (as of 1990–2005), which is now only twice daily. The bus stop is on the junction between the A831 and School Road End. Road transport is often disrupted by harsh winter weather during December and January.

== Nearby satellite settlements ==
Several small near-by settlements include: Strathnacro, Balnaglack, Balbeg, Uppertown, Balnalurigan and Lochletter Cottages.

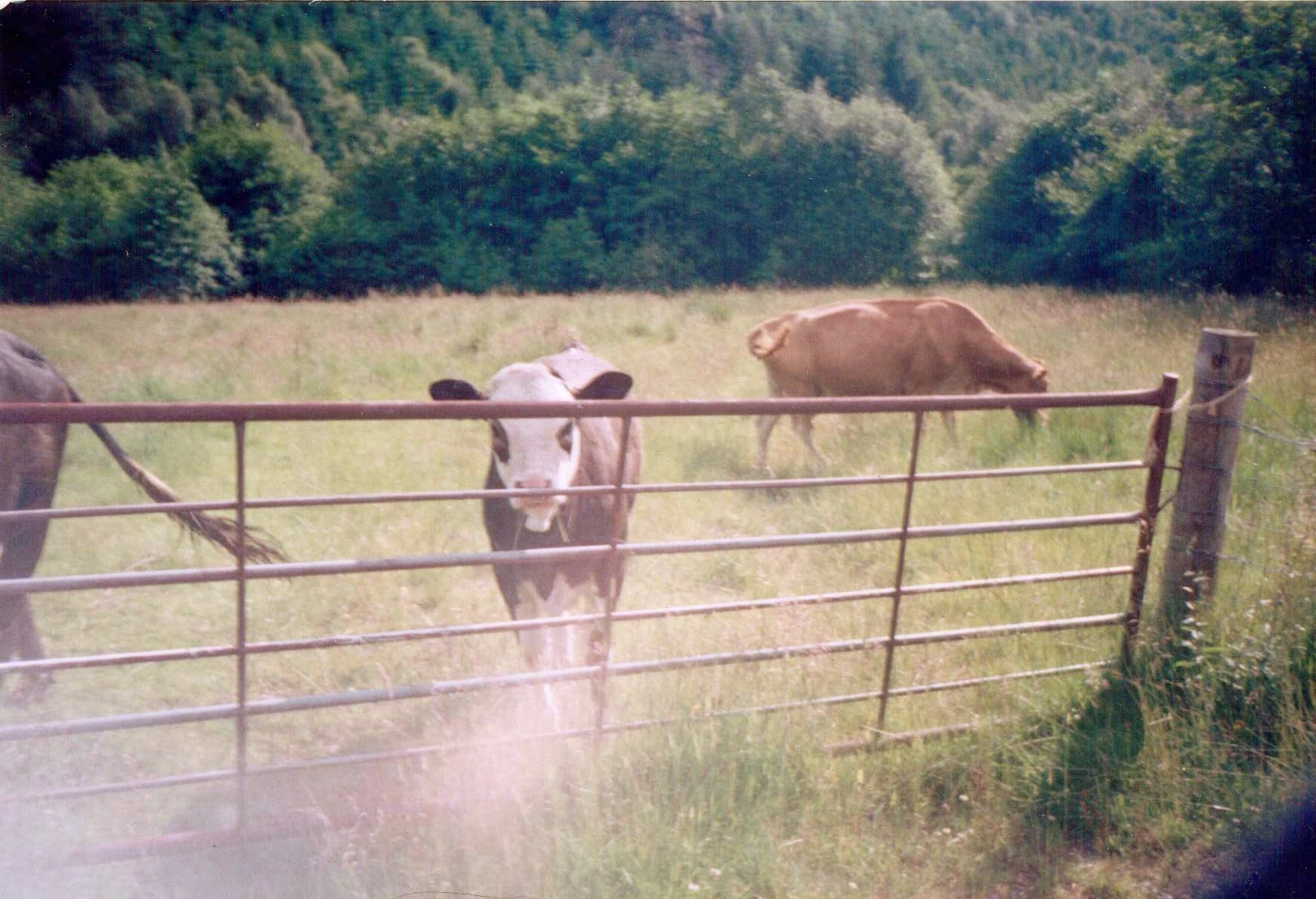
A field in Lochletter.

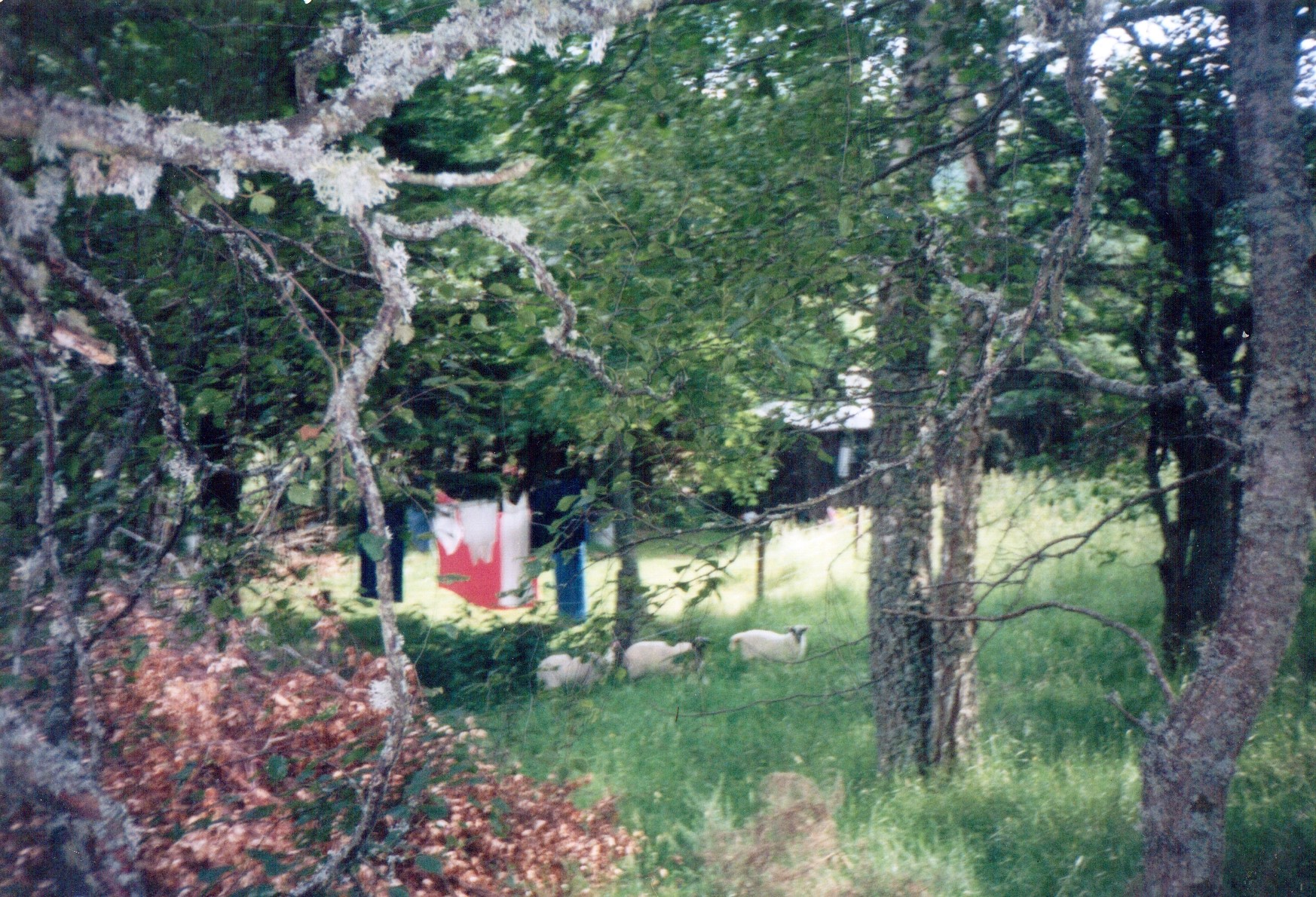
A farm in Strathnacro.

== Political representation ==
It has been part of following Westminster constituencies:

1. Inverness-shire (UK Parliament constituency) 1708-1918
2. Inverness (UK Parliament constituency) 1918-1983
3. Ross, Cromarty and Skye (UK Parliament constituency) 1983-1997
4. Ross, Skye and Inverness West (UK Parliament constituency) 1997-2005
5. Inverness, Nairn, Badenoch and Strathspey (UK Parliament constituency) 2005-2024
6. Inverness, Skye and West Ross-shire (UK Parliament constituency) 2024-to date

== Gallery ==
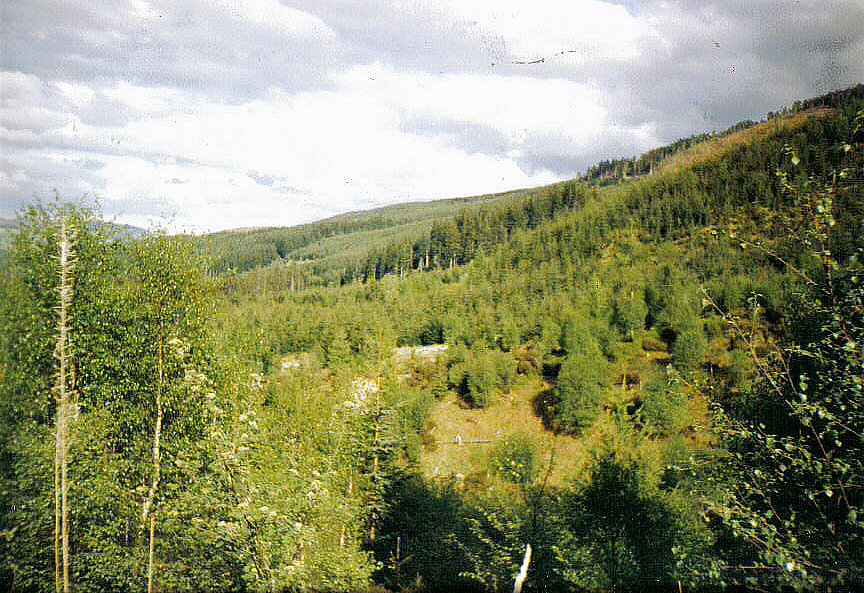
A picture of the forests above Balnain in 1999.

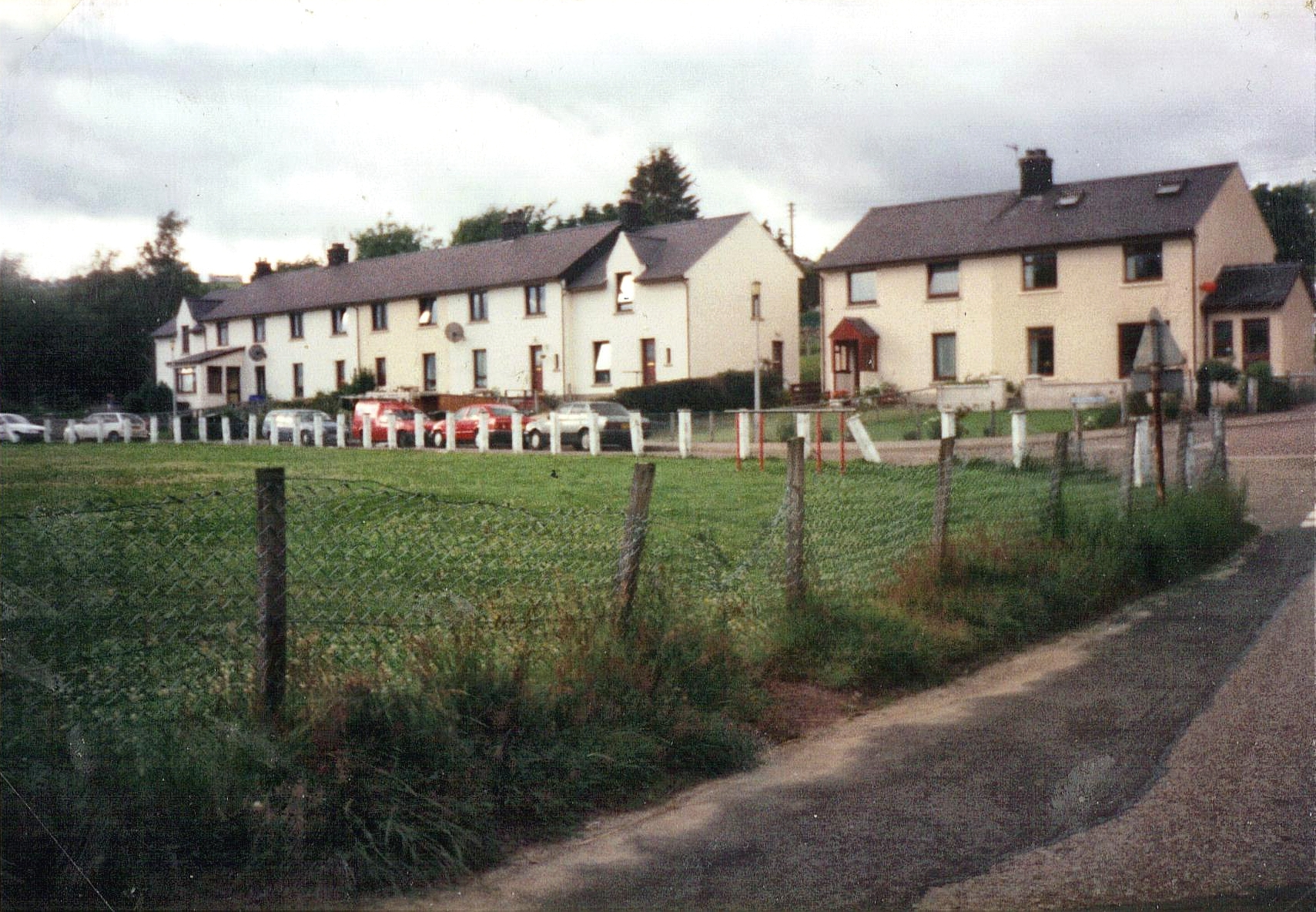
A picture of Balnain in 1996.

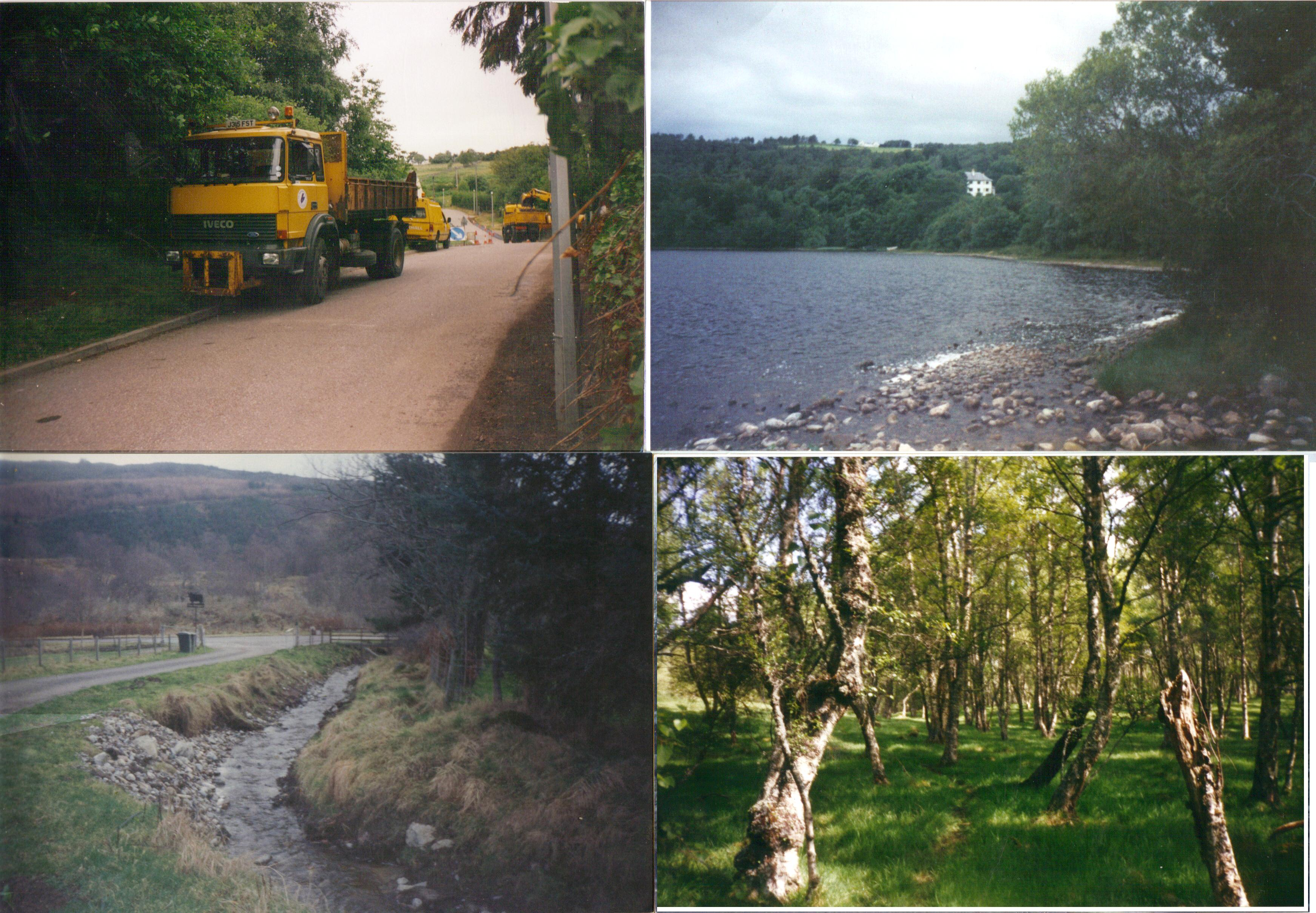
4 images of Balnain Village in 1998. The local loch is top right.

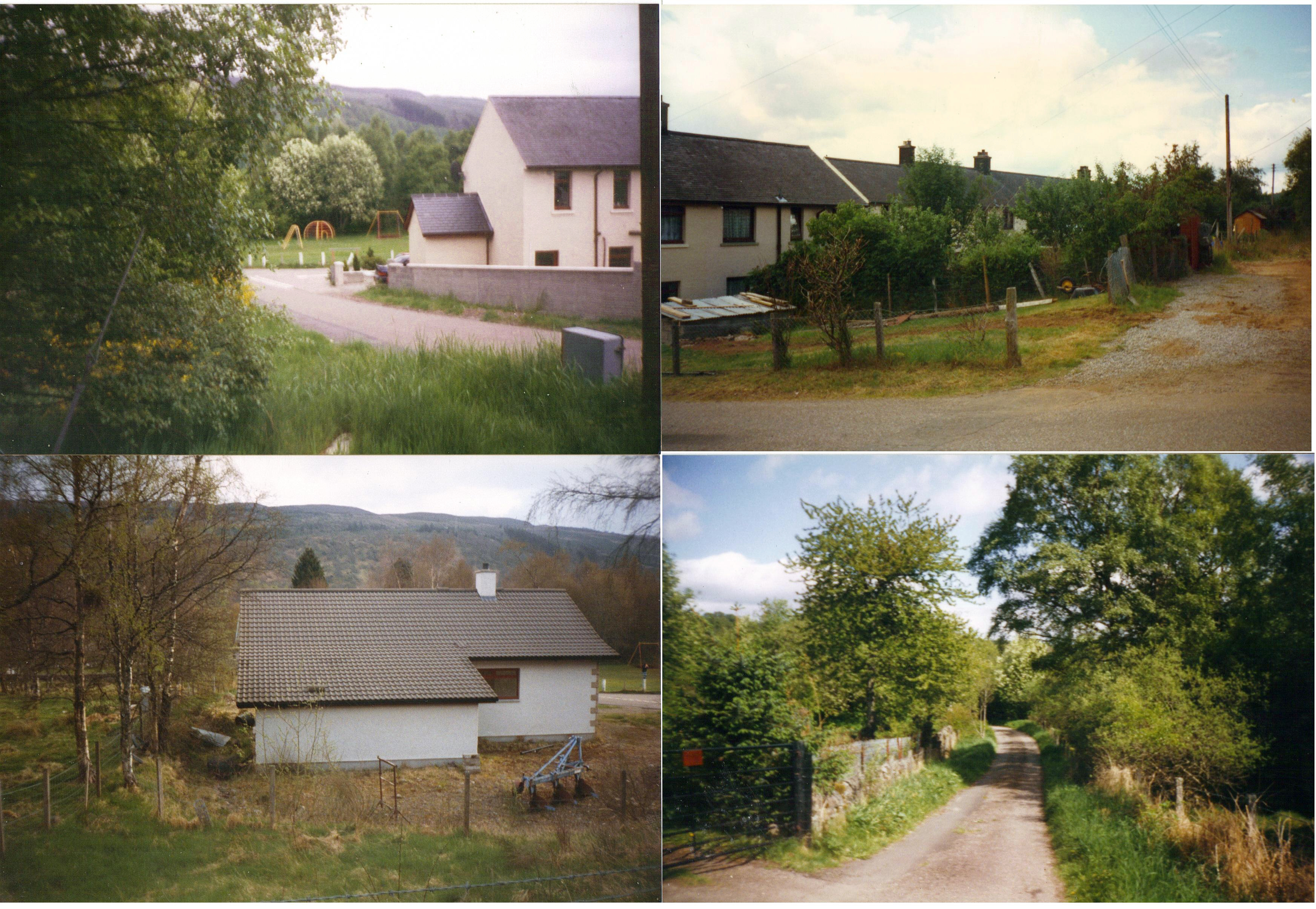
4 images of Balnain Village in 1998.

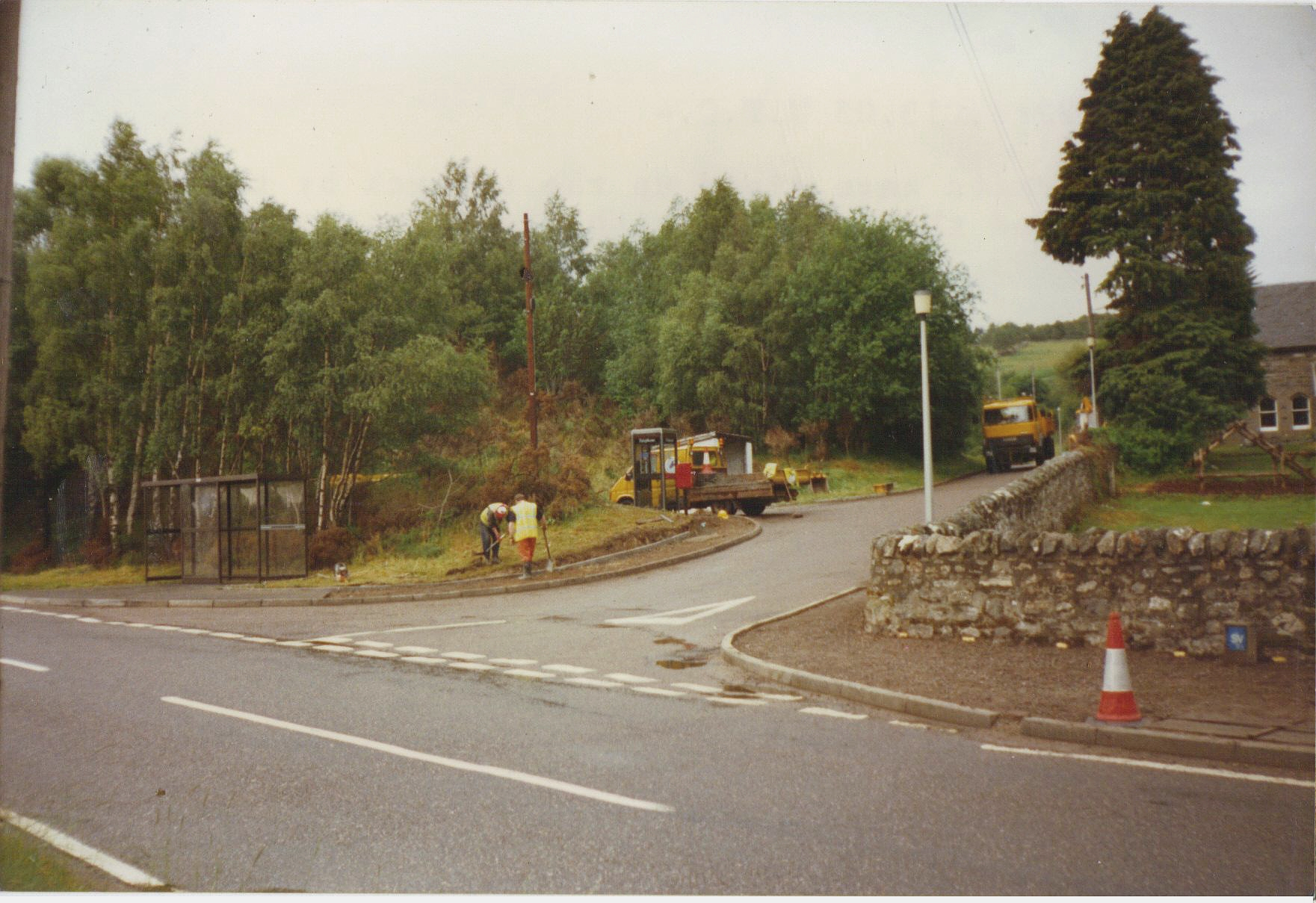
A picture Balnain in 1998. The Shelter by the workmen is the new 1990s bus shelter and the white concrete shelter behind the van is the old 1970s bus shelter.

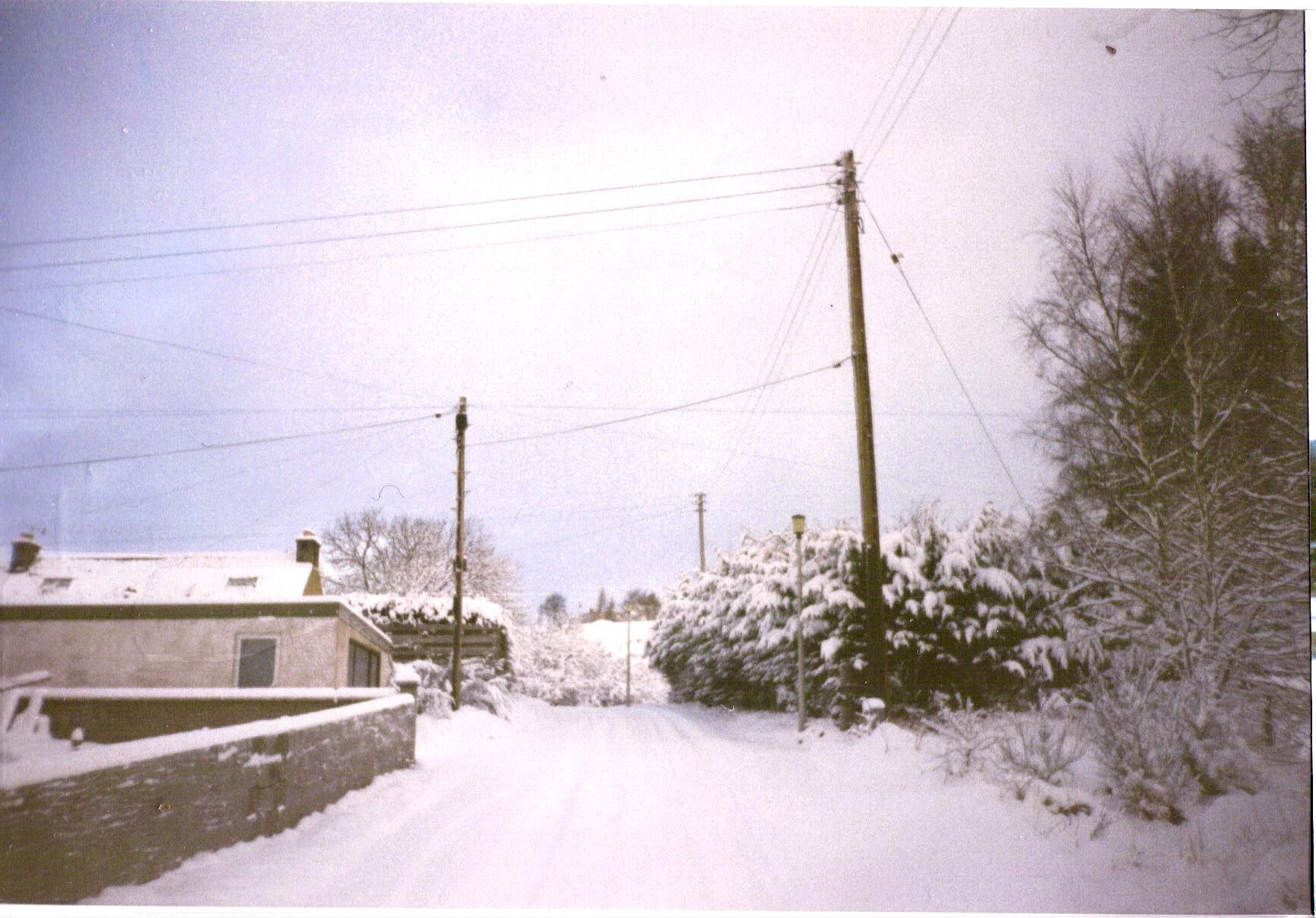
A picture of Balnain in the winter 1995.

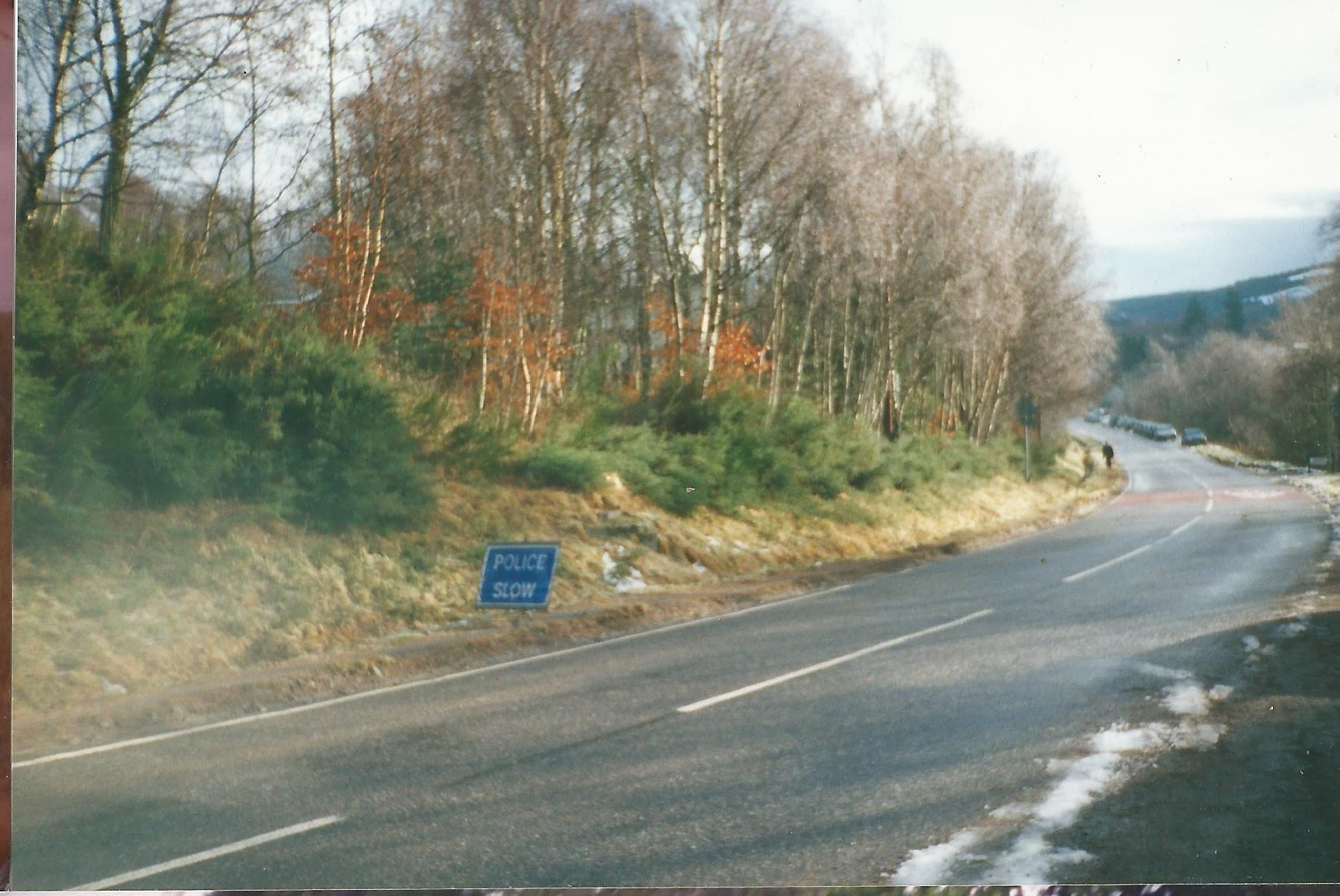
The road in to Balnain in 1998.

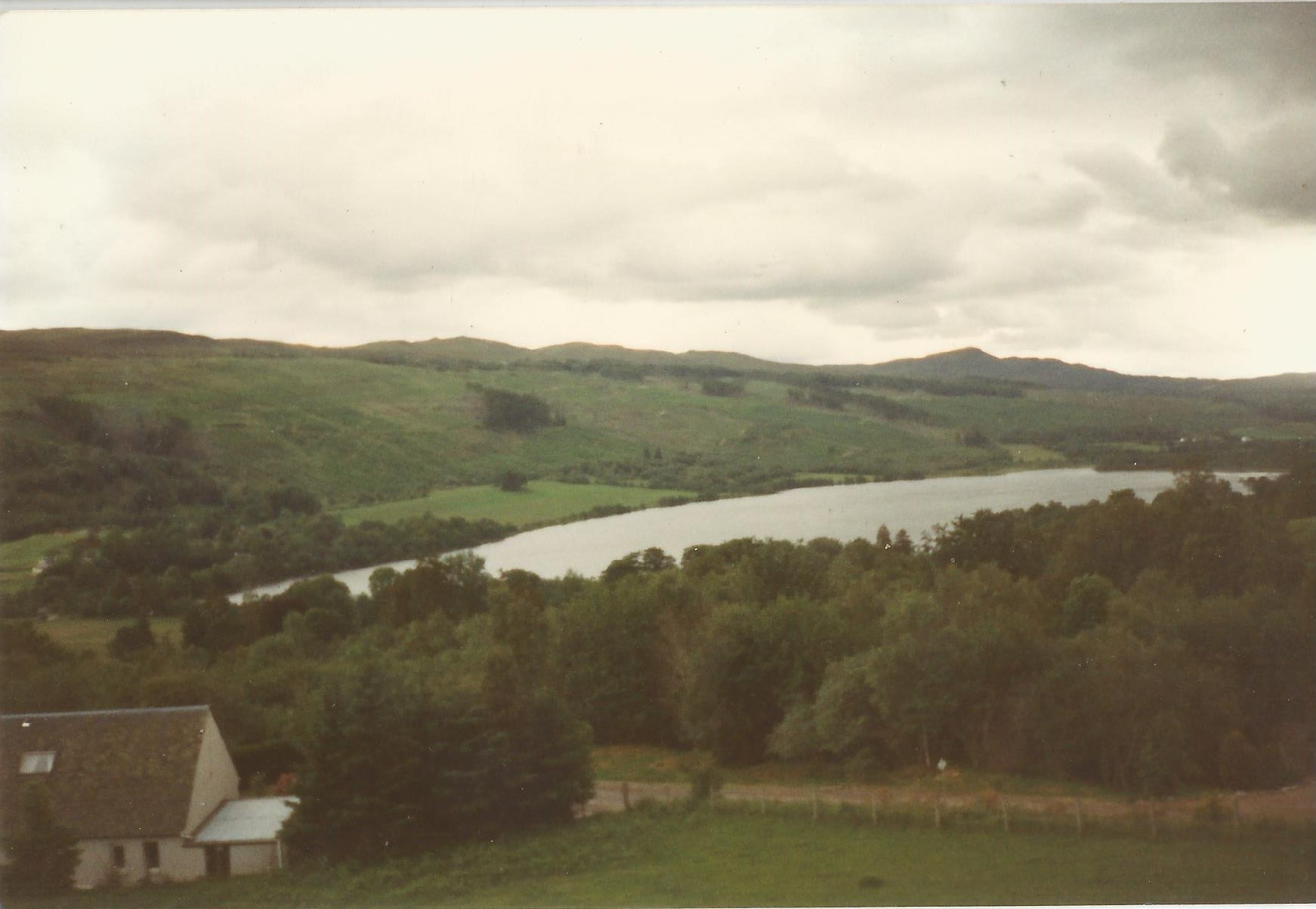
Lock Loch Meiklie seen from Balnaglack.

== See also ==
- Inverness
- Charles Kennedy MP
- Simon Fraser of Balnain
- Balbeg
- Corrimony
- Altnaharra
