= Corrimony =

Village in Highland, Scotland

Coordinates: 57.33484°N 4.68949°W

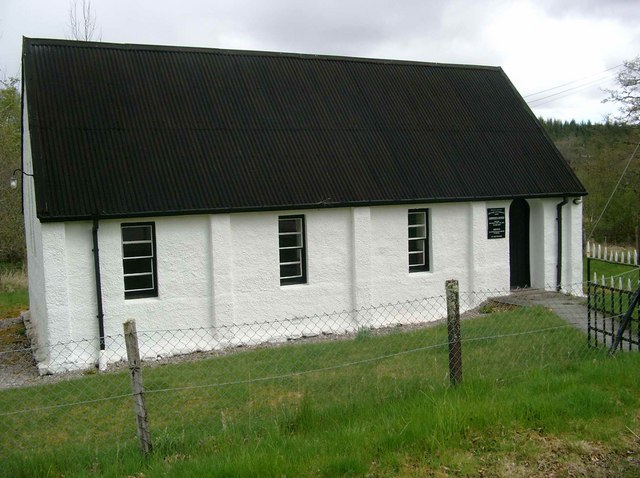
- Corrimony Church

- Location within the Inverness area
- OS grid reference: NH382303
- Council area: Highland
- Country: Scotland
- Sovereign state: United Kingdom
- Post town: Drumnadrochit
- Postcode district: IV63 6
- Police: Scotland
- Fire: Scottish
- Ambulance: Scottish

Corrimony (Scottish Gaelic: Coire Monaidh) is a small village at the western end of Glenurquhart, in Inverness-shire, in the Highlands of Scotland, now within Highland council area. It is 13 km west of Drumnadrochit, and 32 km south-west of Inverness.

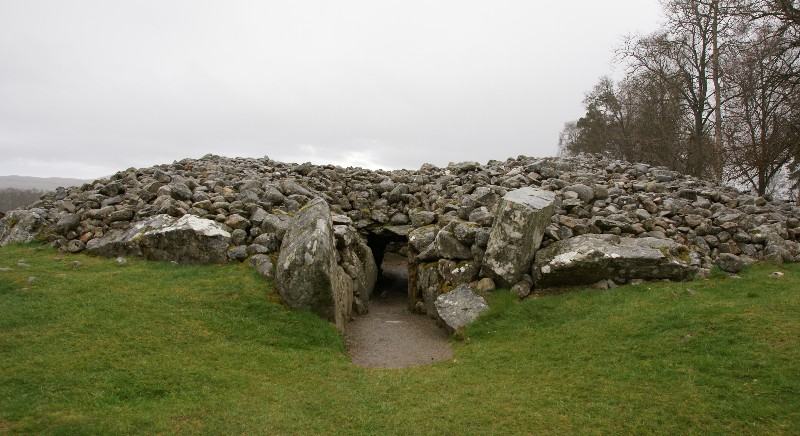
Corrimony chambered cairn

Corrimony is famous for Mony's Stone and Corrimony chambered cairn. The chambered cairn is part of the Clava group of cairns, dating back 4,000 years. The cairn is surrounded by 11 standing stones.

The River Enrick passes Corrimony, before flowing down Glenurquhart to Loch Ness. The river flows over Corrimony Falls, a waterfall to the south of the settlement.

An upland area to the south is owned by the RSPB, and run as Corrimony nature reserve. The site covers 1531 ha, and was acquired by the RSPB in 1997. The RSPB are working to restore Caledonian Forest, for the benefit of Black Grouse.

== See also ==
- Balbeg
- Balnain
