= James Grant (antiquary) =

Scottish antiquarian

- Born: 1840; Glen Urquhart, Inverness-shire
- Died: 1885 (aged 44–45)
- Occupation: Antiquarian

James Grant (1840–1885) was a Scottish antiquarian.

== Biography ==
Grant was born in 1840 in Glen Urquhart, Inverness-shire, was educated at Aberdeen University, where he took the degree of M.A. He obtained the Grant bursary, and studied law at Edinburgh with a view to the Scottish bar; but his grotesque dwarfish figure and his odd voice made success in this field near unattainable. He devoted himself to studies connected with Scottish antiquities.

For a number of years he acted as assistant to Professor Cosmo Innes (whose books owe a good deal to him), and did much work under John Hill Burton and Professor Masson, in preparing for publication the Scots privy council records (Register of the Privy Council, introduction (Burton), vol. i. p. liv; introduction (Masson), vol. iii. p. lxxxviii). The work by which Grant deserves to be remembered, however, is his 'History of the Burgh and Parish Schools of Scotland' (in two volumes: the first, on the burgh schools, has alone been published (1876); the second volume exists in a completed or almost completed state). The notability of this work is that it is largely based on hitherto unpublished sources, which the author collected with vast labour and patience. It is full of curious and minute details, which shed light, not only on the educational, but on the social history of Scotland. The book drew little notice when it appeared (a neglect which the author felt somewhat keenly); but it is of permanent value. Grant also wrote a 'History of the University of Edinburgh' (unpublished). He was elected a F.S.A. (Scotl.), and enjoyed the friendship and esteem of David Laing and other distinguished Scottish scholars. He died at his brother's house, 114 Bell Terrace, Newcastle-on-Tyne, 9 August 1885, and was buried on the 13th in Glen Urquhart.
