= Cyclone Emma (2008) =

2008 European windstorm

Cyclone Emma 2008
Meteorological history
- Formed: 28 February 2008
- Dissipated: 7 March 2008

Extratropical cyclone
- Highest gusts: 236 km/h (147 mph) Krippenstein, Austria
- Lowest pressure: 959 mb (28.3 inHg)

Overall effects
- Fatalities: 15
- Areas affected: Belgium, Netherlands, Germany, Austria, Switzerland, Poland, Czech Republic

Cyclone Emma was an extratropical cyclone that passed through several mainly Central European countries, on Saturday 1 March 2008, killing at least twelve people in Austria, Germany, Poland and the Czech Republic. Wind speeds reached up to 155–180 km/h (96–112 mph) in Austria and the Czech Republic. Major infrastructure disruptions and some injuries were also reported in Belgium, France, Switzerland, and the Netherlands.

A Lufthansa jet almost crashed attempting to land in crosswinds at Hamburg.

== Meteorological context ==
On 28 February 2008, a low-pressure area formed near Newfoundland. The pressure in its center was around 985 hPa (29.1 inHg) at the time of formation. Within a few hours, the depression had strengthened to 959 hPa (28.3 inHg) near the Faroe Islands. On the evening of 29 February, the warm front reached the German coast, causing heavy rain and followed around midnight by a cold front and violent winds.

== Progression of the storm ==
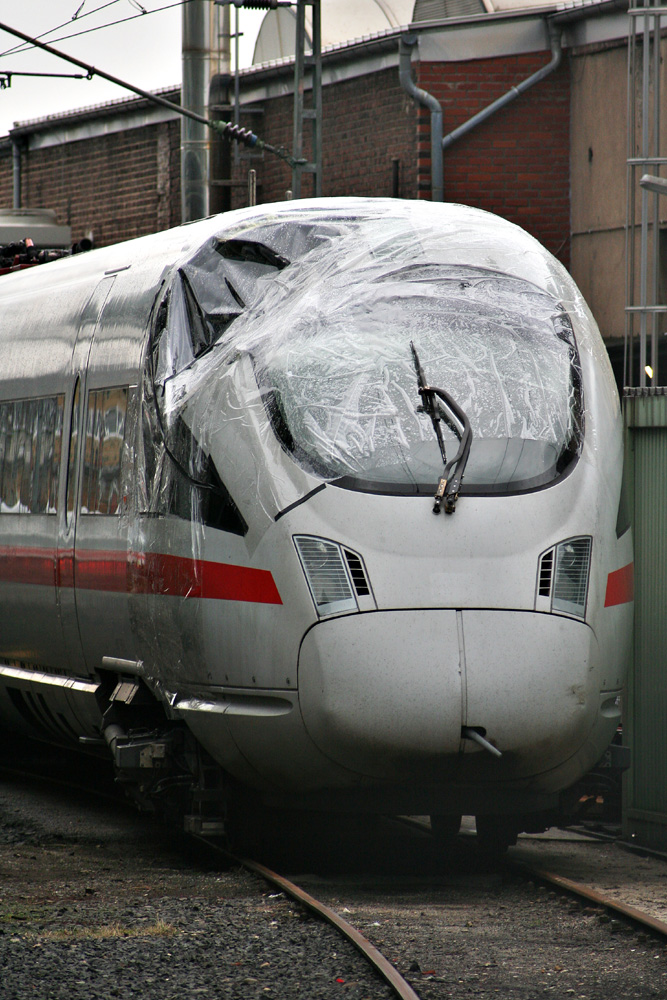
The front car of an ICE T had been hit by a falling tree near Brühl and was severely damaged.

Germany and the Netherlands were the first hit by the storm. Emma made landfall on the evening of 29 February, followed by violent gusts of wind reaching a maximum of 150 km/h (93 mph). In a number of German regions, these gusts resulted in the authorities stopping railway and car traffic. The air traffic of the Amsterdam Airport Schiphol was greatly disturbed. On the seaside, the dam of the Hollandsche Ijssel was closed as a precaution against storm surges. Six deaths were reported in Germany.

In Belgium, firemen carried out a hundred interventions overnight, mainly due to trees being brought down by the wind.

The gusts quickly moved towards Bavaria, resulting in a loss of power for nearly 150,000 people, damage to urban infrastructure and transport, and trees brought down. The authorities expect the financial toll of the storm to go up to "tens of millions euro in damage".

In North Rhine-Westphalia, more than a million cubic meters of windthrow were reported to have been caused by the storm.

On the morning of 1 March, as the storm moved to the south-east, gusts caused two accidents. A tree fell on the Intercity-Express. Shortly after, an Airbus A320 of the Lufthansa nearly crashes on the runway of the airport of Hamburg. As the gusts destabilize the plane, the pilot barely manages to land.

In France, the region of Alsace was affected by the storm, and in Pfastatt, part of the roof of a supermarket was torn away, leading to a preventive evacuation.

In Austria, the storm pushed the government to cut access to several roads and motorways. Damage is reported in a number of locations, while winds reaching 190 km/h (120 mph) are measured in the Austrian Alps, and 140 km/h (87 mph) in Salzburg and Vienna. In Vienna, a crane fell on the Südbahnhof and nearly 10,000 homes lost power.

In Switzerland and Liechtenstein, the winds gusted to 200 km/h (120 mph), resulting in several injuries. The A1 and A3 motorways were temporarily closed to traffic due to trees brought down on the roadways.

Poland was also affected by the storm. A train linking Warsaw and Kraków was cancelled due to security concerns, with significant damage and two deaths reported. Thousands of homes experienced power outages.

In the Czech Republic, the region of Prague was swept with winds reaching 140 km/h (87 mph). In the capital city, the roof of a building is torn out, leading to the evacuation of forty residents. A power outage caused by damaged power lines affects 920,000 homes, which represents around 10% of the Czech population, and the railway traffic is heavily disturbed. The total cost of the storm in the country is estimated to be of several hundreds of million Czech crowns by the largest Czech assurance company, Ceska Pojistovna. Two people are killed by the storm.

As the storm came to a close, floods caused by heavy rain affected several areas including Bavaria.

== Death toll ==
- In Germany, five people died in traffic accidents caused by the weather conditions, while a sixth was crushed by a tree.
- In Austria, two people fell victim to falling trees, while a third was swept away by a landslide. Shortly after, a man died in his caravan when it was swept away by the wind.
- In Poland, two people died in traffic accidents caused by fallen trees and other fragments.
- In the Czech Republic, an 11-year-old girl was crushed by a tree in Líbeznice, while a man in his eighties died after being hit by a corrugated plate torn out by the storm.

== See also ==
- Cyclone Carmen
- Other storms named Emma
