= Balbeg, Highland =

Coordinates: 57.344599°N 4.570095°W

Balbeg: Scottish Gaelic: Am Baile Beag
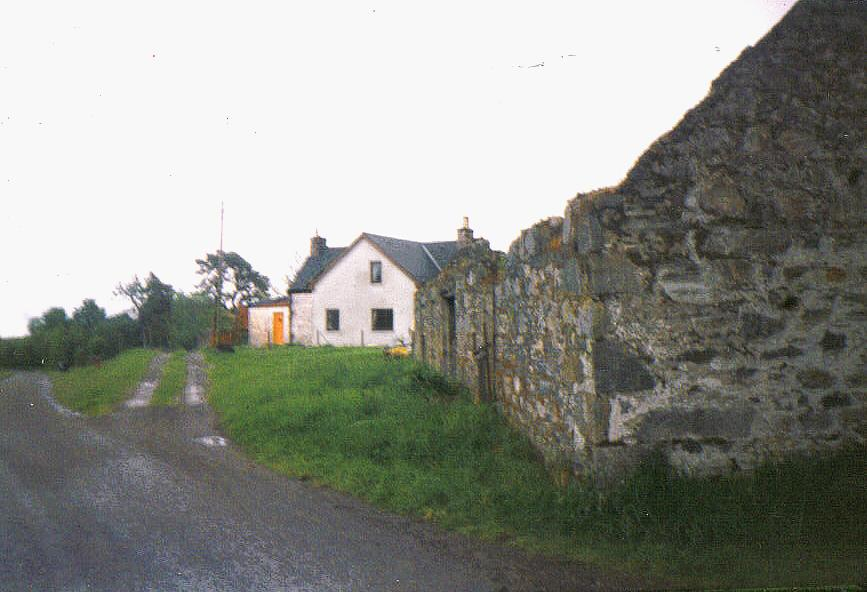
- Balbeg in 1996

- Location within the Inverness area
- OS grid reference: NH480300
- Council area: Highland
- Country: Scotland
- Sovereign state: United Kingdom
- Postcode district: IV63 6
- Police: Scotland
- Fire: Scottish
- Ambulance: Scottish
- UK Parliament: Inverness, Nairn, Badenoch and Strathspey (UK Parliament constituency)

Balbeg (Scottish Gaelic: Am Baile Beag) is a clachan (hamlet) about 0.5 miles (1 km) north-east of Balnain, 4 miles (6 km) west of Drumnadrochit, Inverness-shire (in the Scottish Highlands) and is in the Scottish council area of Highland.

Balbeg is also the name of another small settlement, located on the north west shore of Loch Ness, about 4 miles south of Drumnadrochit. The two settlements are sometimes confused.

== History ==
=== Balmacaan Estate ===
Much of Glenurquhart was part of the Balmacaan Estate (also known as the Glen Urquhart Estate) owned by the Grant family of Seafield between 1509 and 1946. The estate was rented to the wealthy American industrialist and local benefactor Bradley Martin in the late 19th and early 20th century and flourished in the 1880s and 1890s, but went into decline after the 1920s. The estate then changed hands so frequently that the issue was raised in parliament. The best forestry wood had been felled during World War 2 and the estate was dissolved in 1946. Balmacaan House, near Drumnadrochit, was abandoned soon afterwards, set on fire by vandals in the 1960s and demolished in 1972.

In 1946 Bunloit Farm was separated from Balmacaan Estate and Bunloit Estate was formed round it near the small settlement of Balbeg, located on the north west shore of Loch Ness, about 4 miles south of Drumnadrochit.

Glenurquhart, the valley in which Balbeg is located, used to be part of the lands of the Grants of Glenmorison, with the lands of the Frasers to the north for most of its time.

Balbeg, like Balnain, did not yet exist in 1832. The River Enrick, which flows through Glenurquhart, was known as Endrie Water at this time. Several buildings were erected during 1872, appearing on some maps, but not others. It was there by 1896 and 1878.

== Climate ==
Like most of the United Kingdom, the Inverness area has an oceanic climate (Köppen: Cfb).

The weather is pleasantly warm and sunny in the spring and summer, cool and fairly rainy in the autumn and very cold and snowy (with some blizzards) in the winter.

== Transport ==
There are occasional buses to Balnain, from which Balbeg is a short walk.

== Images ==
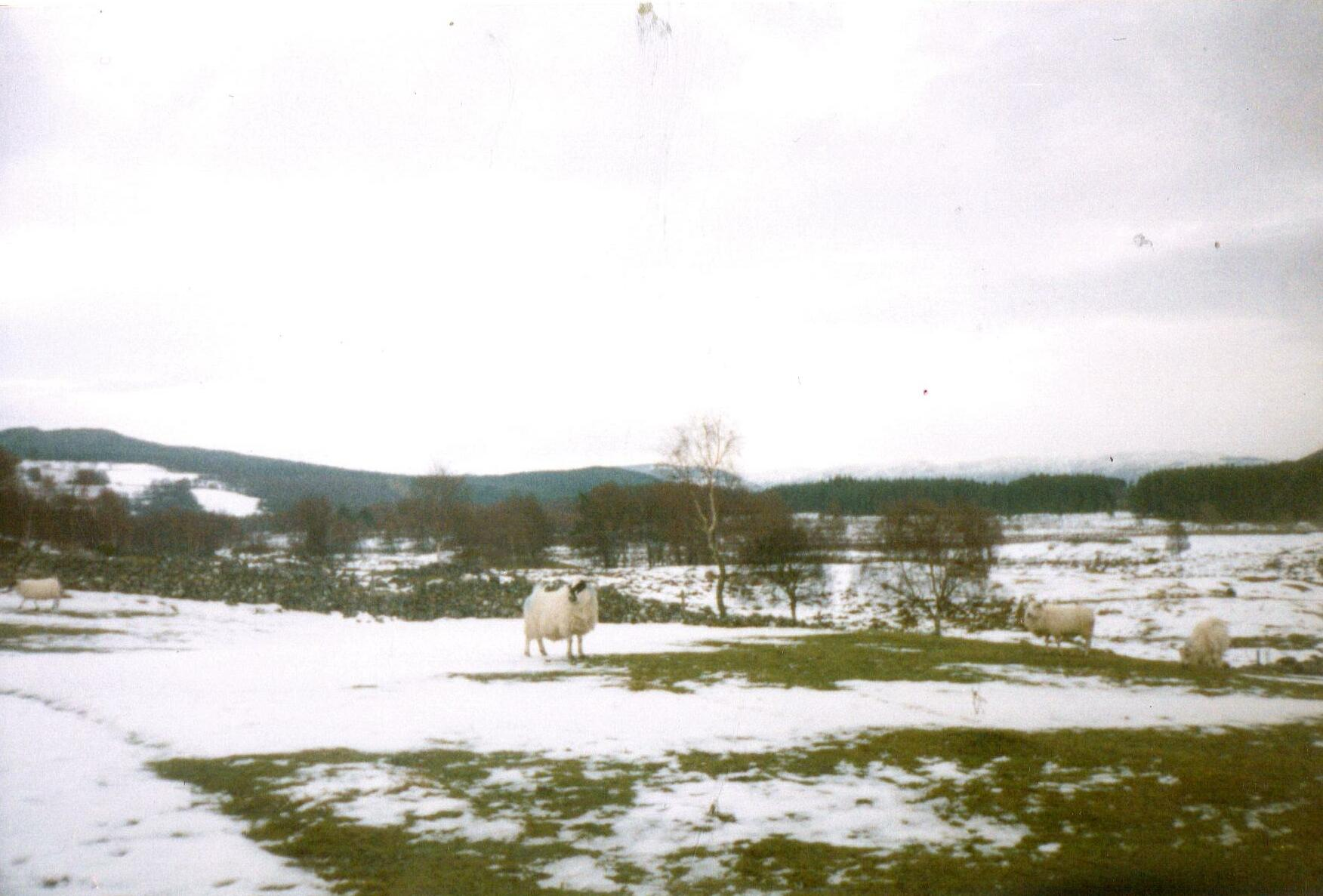
Sheep on a Balbeg farm during the winter of 1996.

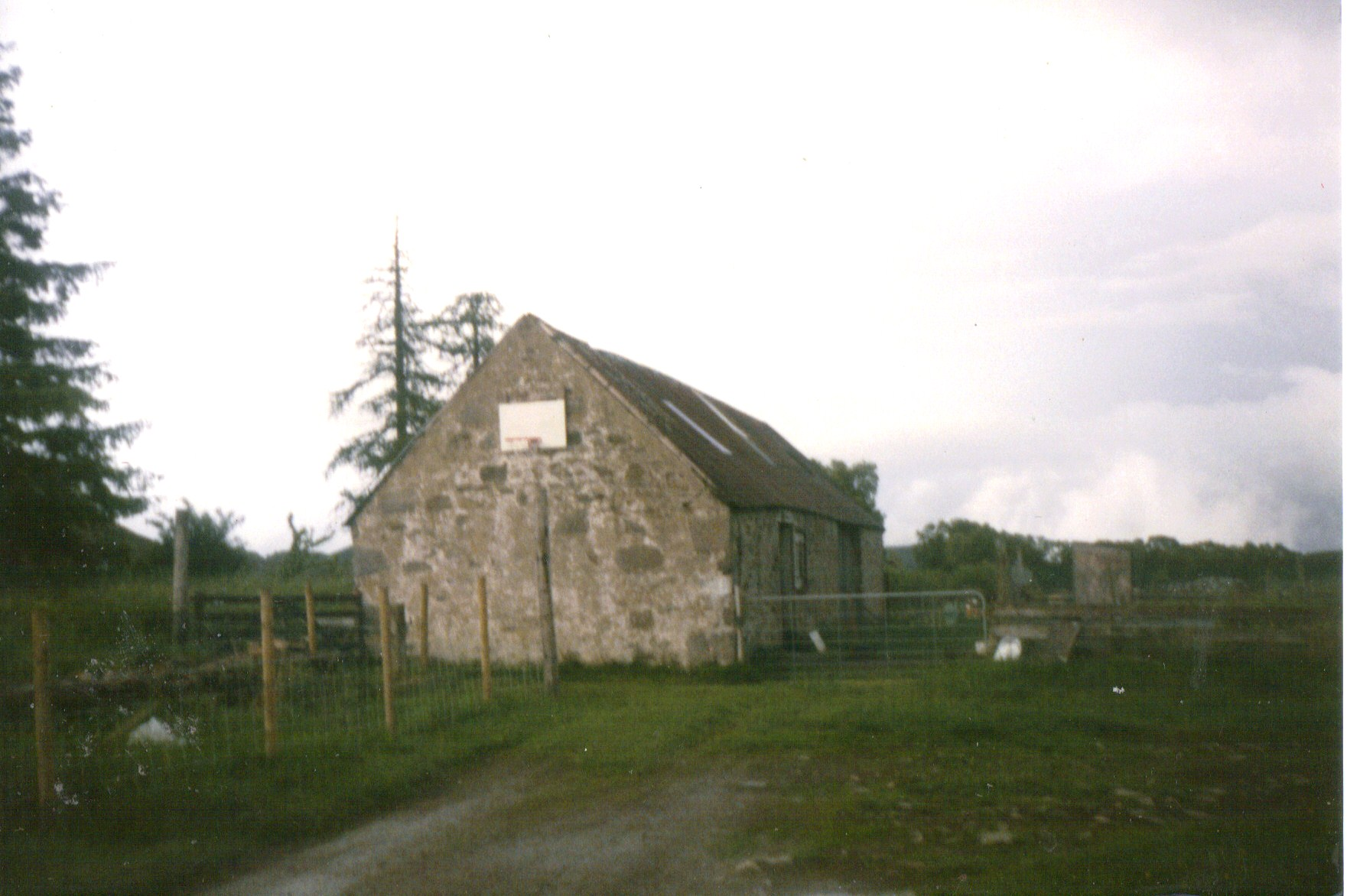
A Balbeg barn in 1998

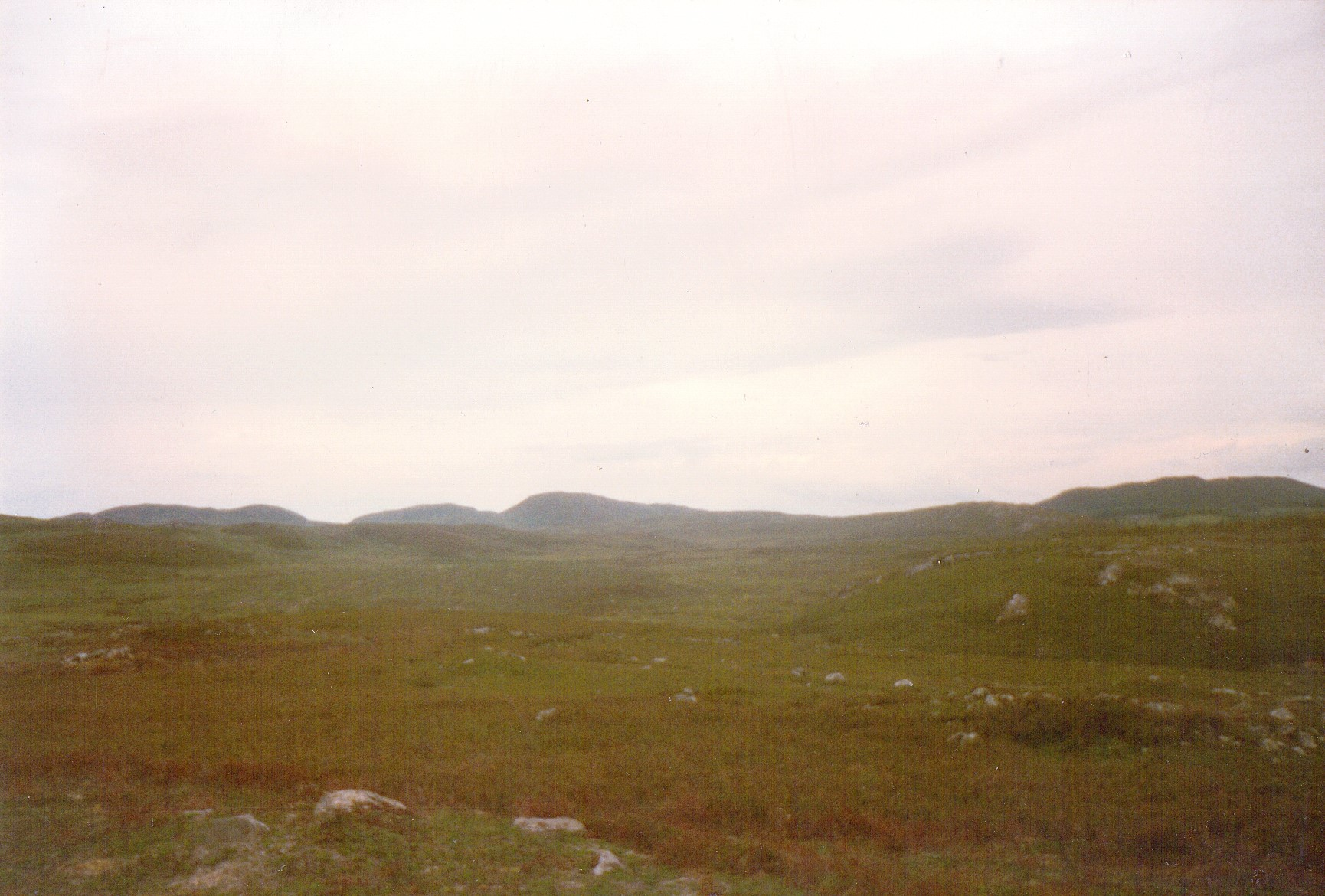
Moorland near Balbeg in 1998.

== See also ==
- Inverness
- Charles Kennedy MP
- Corrimony
- Balnain
- Drumnadrochit
