= Glen plaid =

Woollen fabric with a woven twill design of small and large checks

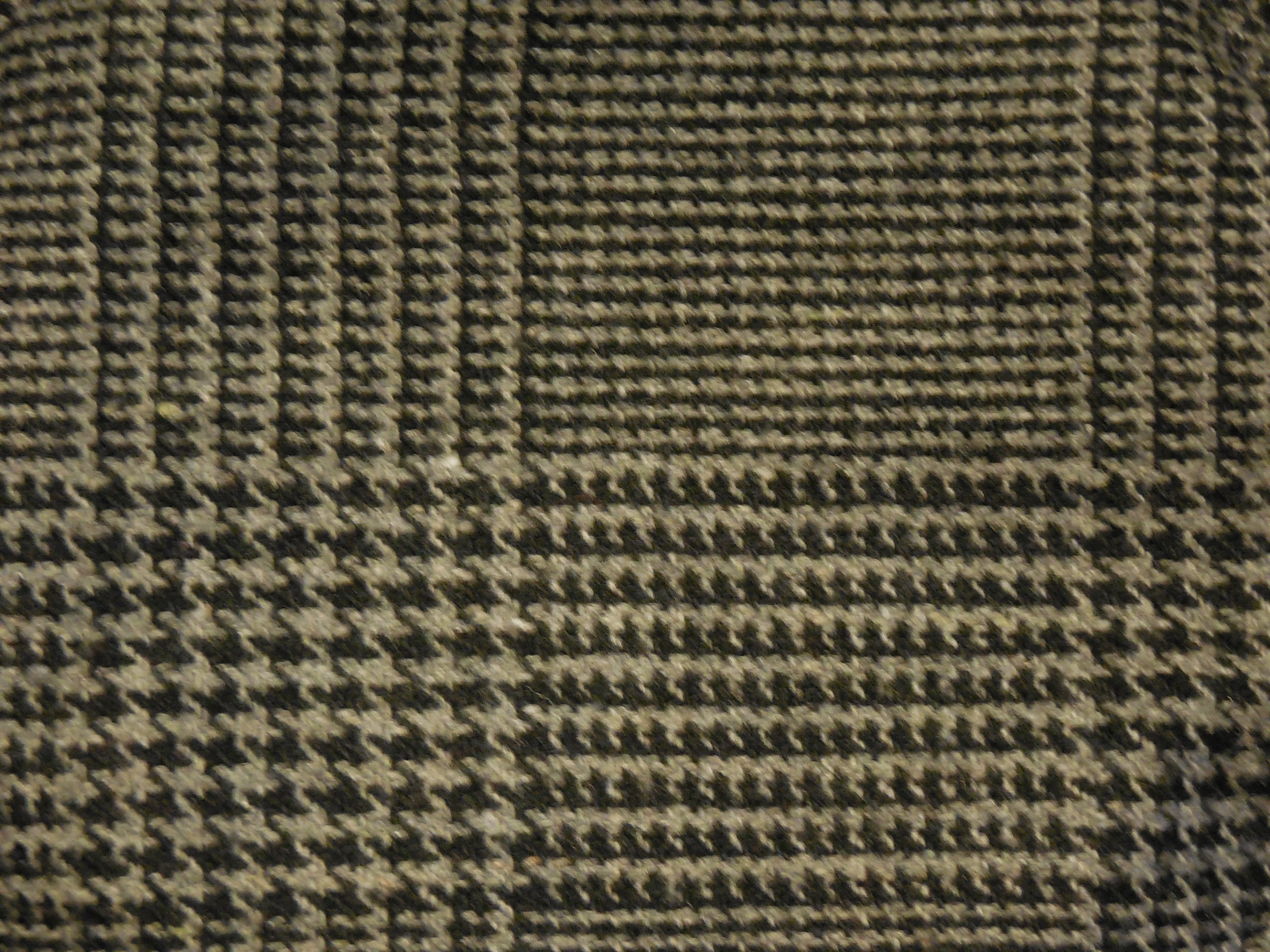
Glen plaid fabric, in a houndstooth weave

Glen plaid (short for Glen Urquhart plaid), also known as Glenurquhart check or Prince of Wales check, is a woollen fabric with a woven twill design of small and large checks. It is usually made of black/grey and white, or with more muted colours, particularly with two dark and two light stripes alternating with four dark and four light stripes, which creates a crossing pattern of irregular checks. Glen plaid as a woven pattern may be extended to cotton shirting and other non-woollen fabrics.

== Name ==
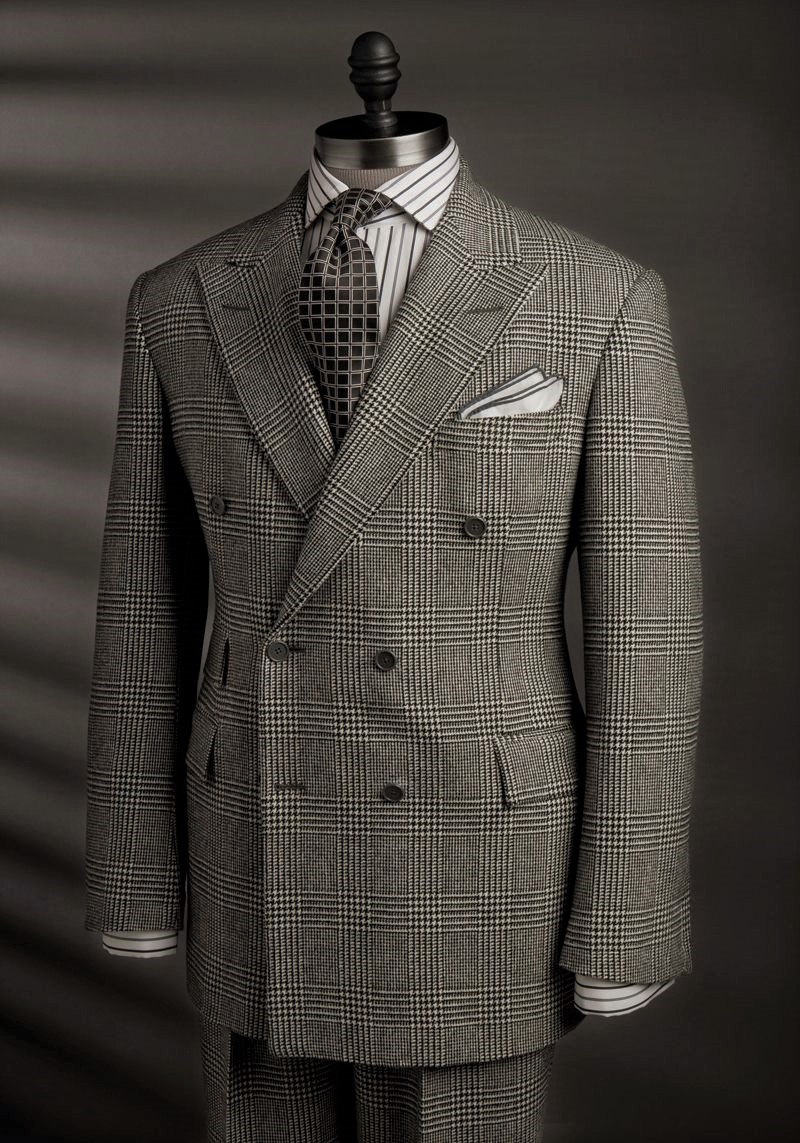
Double-breasted suit in Glen plaid

The name is taken from the Glenurquhart Estate in Inverness-shire, Scotland, where the checked pattern was first used during the 1840s by the Countess of Seafield to fit out her gamekeepers, though the name 'Glen plaid' does not appear before 1926.

Glen plaid is also known as the Prince of Wales check, as it was first made famous by King Edward VII when he was Prince of Wales. The pattern was later popularized by King Edward VIII when he was Prince of Wales. In other words, despite its internationally known name (French prince de Galles, Spanish príncipe de Gales, Italian principe di Galles, etc.), the Prince of Wales check is not a Welsh pattern but a Scottish one.

== Notable wearers ==
Pee-wee Herman was famous for his light-grey Glen plaid suit, and U.S. President Ronald Reagan was considered "unpresidential" in a gray-and-blue Glen plaid suit on a European trip in 1982. In addition, Cary Grant wore a grey suit in a subtle Glen plaid during the 1959 American spy thriller film North by Northwest.

Alan Stanford wore a single-breasted sport coat of Glen plaid tweed in the 1999 film based on George Orwell's Animal Farm.

Matt Smith wore a single-breasted sport coat of brown Glen plaid tweed when playing the Eleventh Doctor in the Doctor Who episode A Christmas Carol.

== See also ==
- Houndstooth
- Tartan
- Eleventh Doctor
