= Loch Meiklie =

Lake in Inverness-shire, Scotland

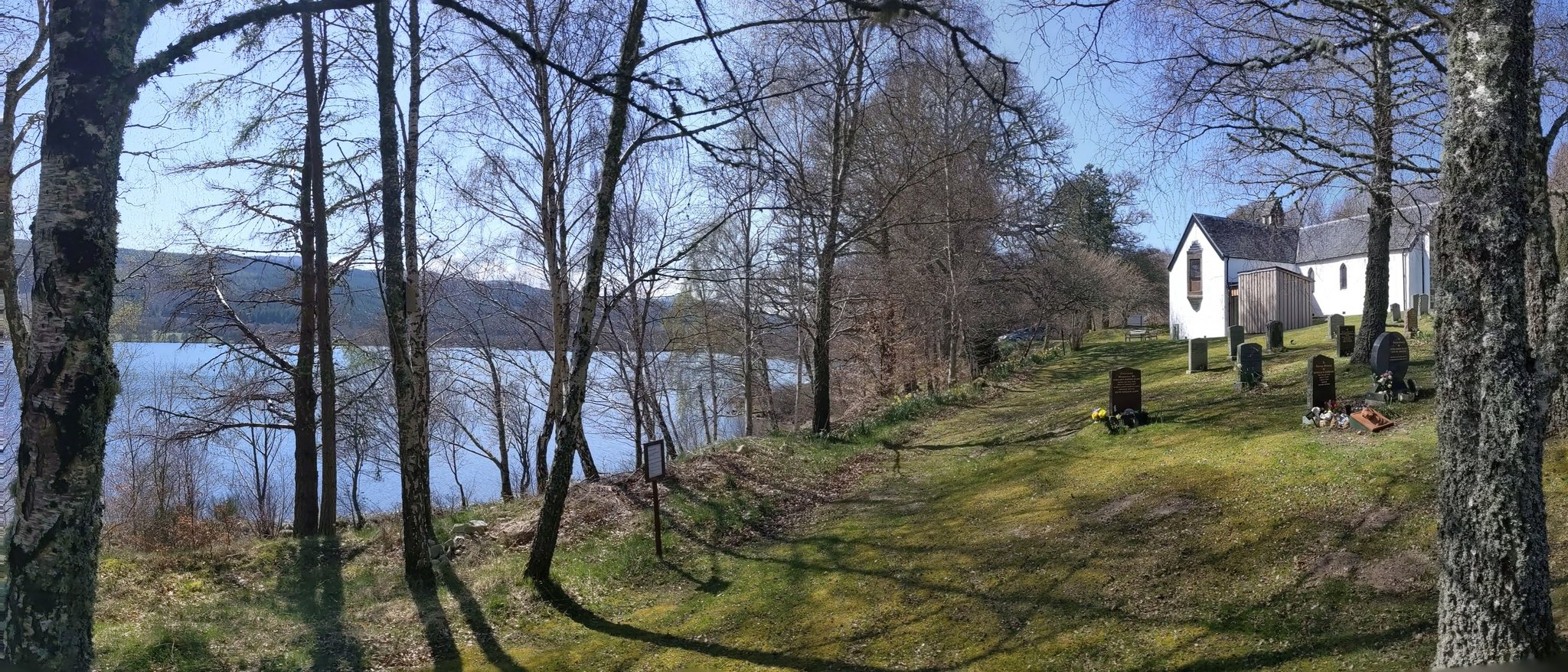
- The loch's north shore, with St Ninian's chapel centre-right

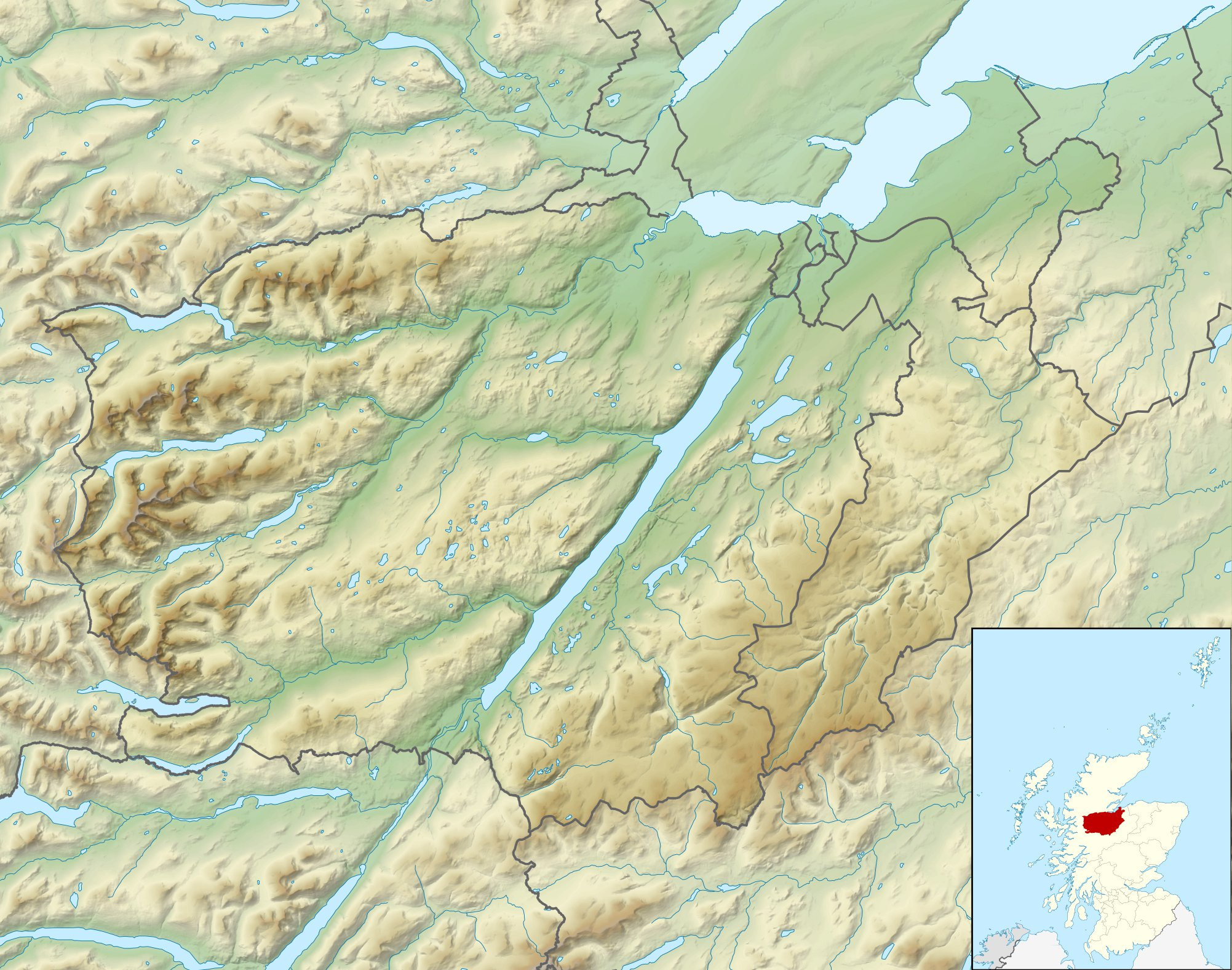
- Location within Inverness area
- Location: Inverness-Shire, Scotland
- Coordinates: 57°20′06″N 4°36′02.1″W
- Type: loch
- Primary inflows: River Enrick
- Primary outflows: River Enrick
- Basin countries: Scotland
- Max. length: 1.65 km (1.03 mi)
- Max. width: 0.68 km (0.42 mi)
- Surface area: 1.0 km^{2} (0.39 sq mi)
- Surface elevation: 110 m (360 ft)

Loch Meiklie is a freshwater loch in Inverness-shire, Scotland, 6.4 kilometres (4.0 mi) west of Drumnadrochit.

The loch is situated on the River Enrick, which ~9.5km downstream flows into Loch Ness. The loch's name may derive from the Scots meikle, meaning "large" or "great". However, as most toponyms in the area are derived from Scottish Gaelic, this seems unlikely. An alternative explanation links the loch's name to Loch Meig in Easter Ross, suggesting a corruption of the Old Gaelic root minc, meaning "pouring forth".

The entry for the Parish of Urquhart in the Old Statistical Account, written in 1798, describes the loch as "a beautiful sheet of water", surrounded by "finely cultivated fields" and "neat gentlemens houses", forming "a very picturesque and romantic landscape".

Several holiday lodges sit on the loch's south-east shore. An Episcopalian chapel dedicated to St Ninian has sat on the loch's north shore since the 1850s. The church was designed by Alexander Ross, and consecrated in 1853 by Bishop Robert Eden. The church contains many Celtic designs and Scottish Gaelic inscriptions.

In 1876, author William McKay claimed to have visited a crannog on the loch, accessible via a winding causeway. However, when Odo Blundell (a Benedictine monk and historian) visited in 1913 he found no such island. Moreover, from conversations with locals who had fished the waters for over fifty years, none could recall "anything unusual in the waters"
