= River Enrick =

Coordinates: 57°19′53″N 4°27′08″W

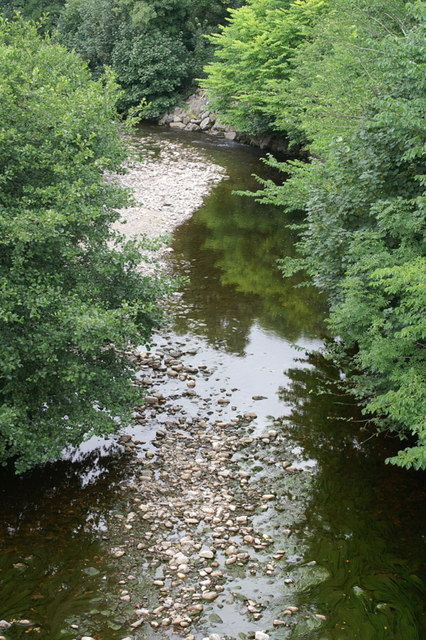

The River Enrick is a river in the Highland region of Scotland. It flows for around 22 km, in a generally northerly and then easterly direction.

It rises near Loch na Stac at an elevation of about 490 metres, and falls rapidly until it reaches the floor of Glen Urquhart at elevation about 120 metres. From that point the A831 road closely follows its course. It flows through Loch Meiklie, near Balnain. It then flows through Drumnadrochit and merges with the River Coiltie about 100 metres before flowing into Urquhart Bay, part of Loch Ness.
