= Corrimony chambered cairn =

Bronze Age chambered cairns located in Glen Urquart, Scotland

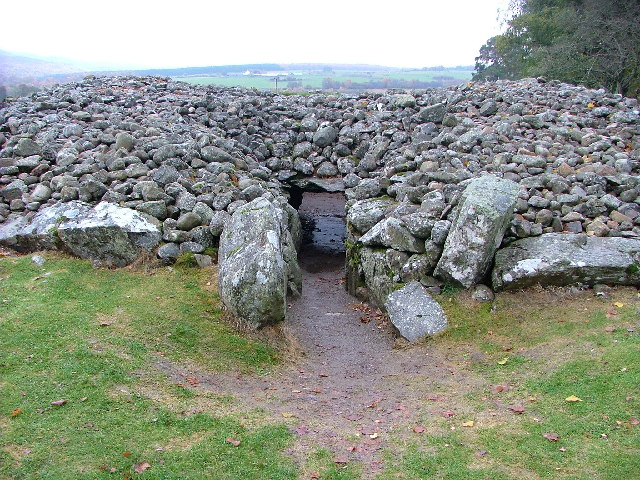
- The cairn in 2004

- Location in Scotland
- 57.33461°N 4.68781°W
- Type: Cairn
- Location: Scotland

History
- Built: c. 2000 BC

Site notes
- Material: Stone
- Diameter: 18 m (59 ft)

The Corrimony chambered cairn, located near the village of Glen Urquhart in the Highlands of Scotland, is a well-preserved Bronze Age burial monument belonging to the group of circular chambered cairns, known as Clava cairns. The site was excavated by archaeologist Professor Stuart Piggott, in 1952. One skeleton and one artefact were uncovered during the investigation. Historic Environment Scotland established the site as a scheduled monument in 1994.

== Description ==
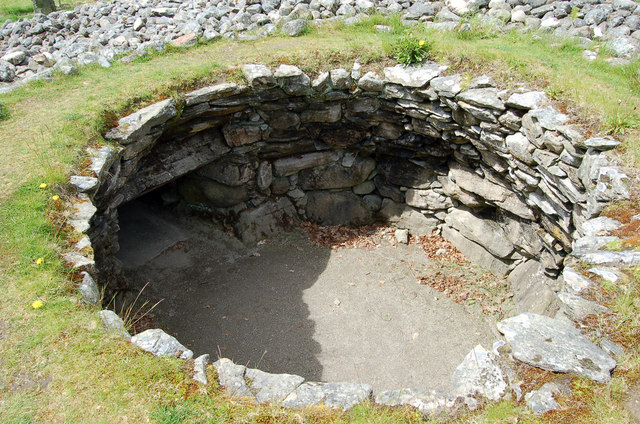
Corrimony central chamber

The historic site consists of a burial mound, edged by a stone kerb, and surrounded by a circle of 11 large stones. A narrow entrance passage, 1 m (3 ft 3 in) in height, leads to the central chamber of the tomb. The chamber was constructed from large vertical boulders and drystone walls. It measures 18 m (59 ft) in diameter, is 2.5 m (8 ft 2 in) in height, and is made up of waterworn stones. The monument is covered by a cup-marked, single slab and piled with small stones. It is thought that the large, flat stone was the original capstone. West of the passage entrance, two newer stones from lintels in the roof were added after construction. Of the 11 stones forming the outer ring round the cairn, four are modern additions. They range in height from 1.5 m (4 ft 11 in) to 2.7 m (8 ft 10 in).

== History ==
The Corrimony chambered cairn belongs to the type of Bronze Age burial monuments known as Clava cairns. They are characterized as having a burial tomb enclosed by a large mound of small stones and encircled by larger stones. To date, these monuments have only been found in the Highlands of Scotland. Clava cairns can be divided into two types: a central burial chamber entered by a passage and a closed cairn without a passage to the central chamber.

The site was excavated by archaeologist, Professor Stuart Piggott, in 1952. During excavation, a crouched inhumation burial was found in the central chamber under a floor of flagstones. The only artefact uncovered during the excavation was a bone pin, which now is in the National Museum of Scotland. Historic Environment Scotland established the site as a scheduled monument in 1994.
