= Glen Urquhart =

Valley in Highland, Scotland

Coordinates: 57°20′20″N 4°34′2″W

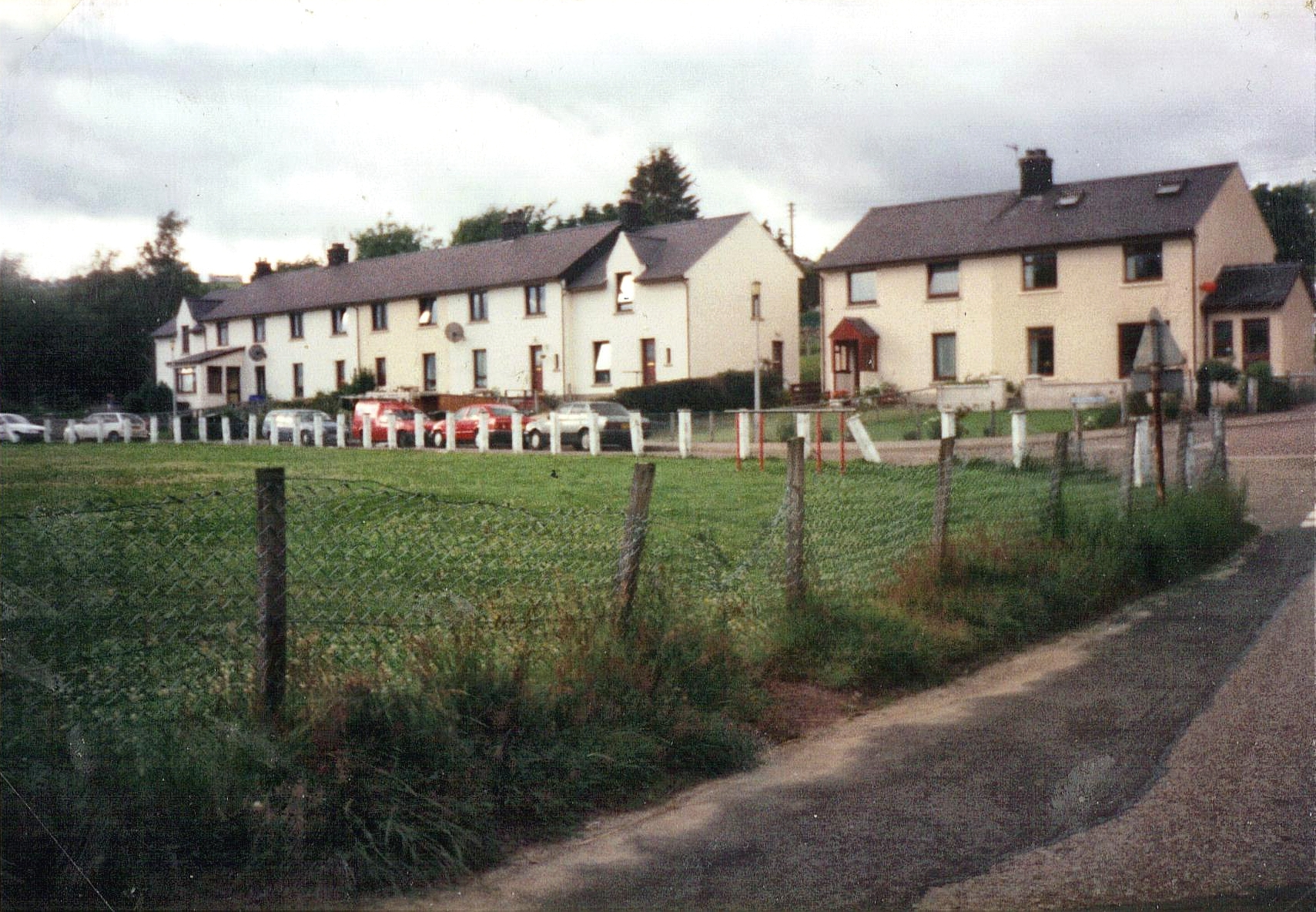
A picture of Balnain in 1996.

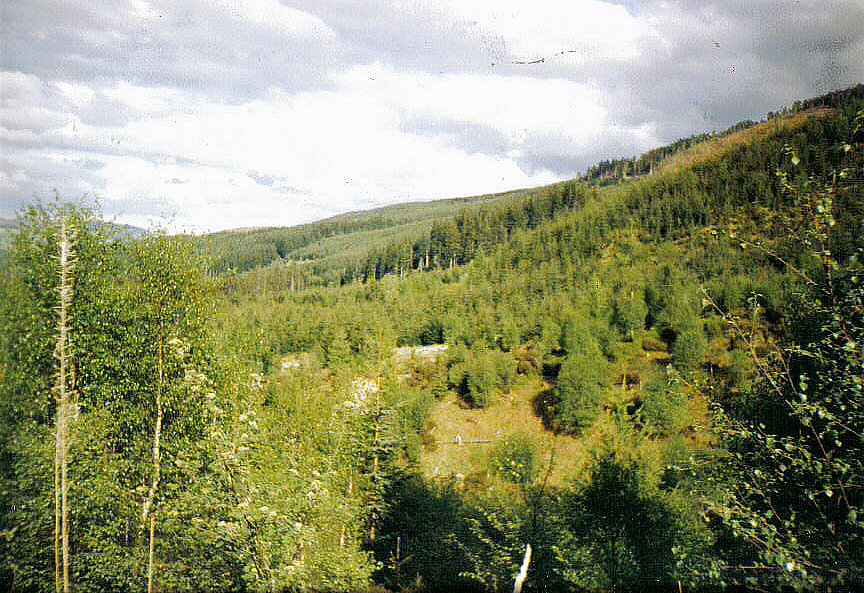
A picture of the forests above Balnain in 1999.

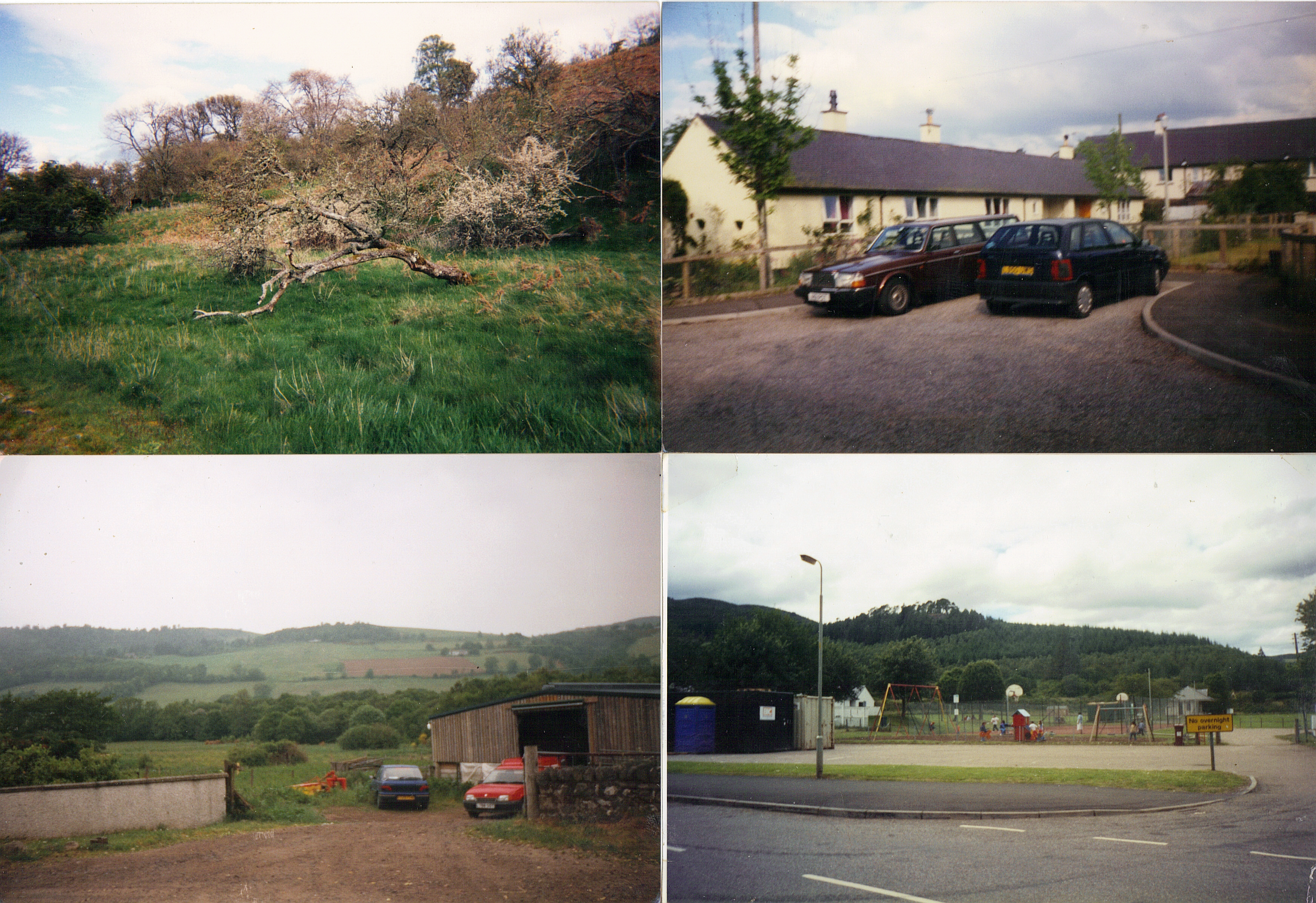
4 images of Drumnadrochit in 1998.

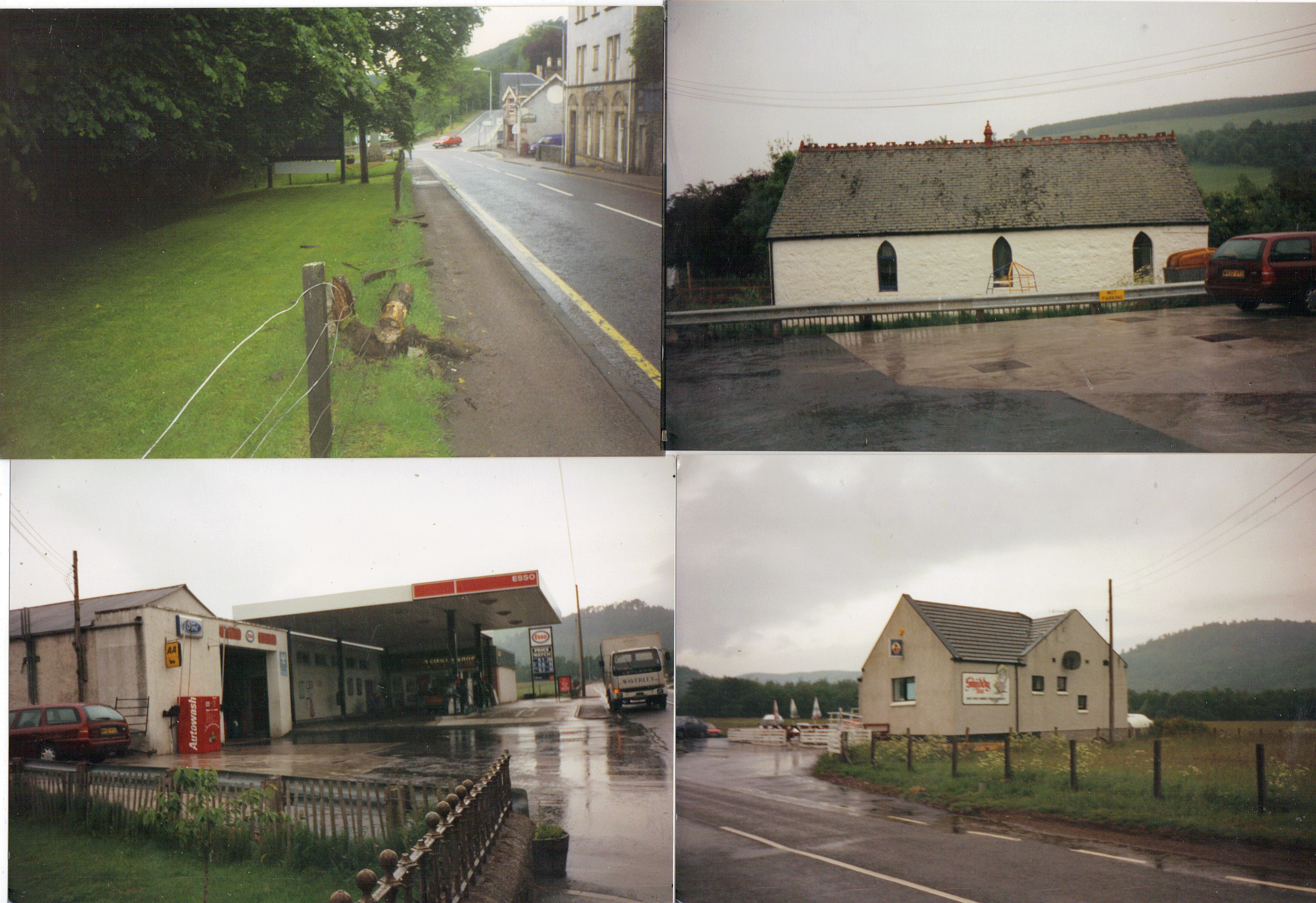
4 images of Drumnadrochit in 1998. The school is top right.

Glenurquhart or Glen Urquhart (Scottish Gaelic: Gleann Urchadain) is a glen running to the west of the village of Drumnadrochit in the Highland council area of Scotland.

== Location ==
Glenurquhart runs from Loch Ness at Urquhart Bay in the east to Corrimony and beyond in the west. The River Enrick runs along its length, passing through Loch Meiklie.

The villages of Balnain and Balbeg are situated about five miles (eight kilometres) up the glen.

== History ==
Glenurquhart used to be part of the lands of the Grants of Glenmoriston, with the lands of the Frasers to the north for most of its time.

== Notable people ==
- Fr. Alexander MacDonnell (1763-1840), first Roman Catholic priest to serve as a military chaplain in post-Reformation British military history, and first Bishop of the Diocese of Kingston, Ontario.
- The Rev. Ewen MacRury (1891–1986), minister of Glen Urquhart from around 1930 to the 1960s, and Moderator of the General Assembly of the Free Church of Scotland in 1944.
- Allan Wilson (1856 – 4 December 1893), an officer in the Victoria Volunteers. He is best known for his leadership of the Shangani Patrol in the First Matabele War. His death fighting overwhelming odds made him a national hero in both Britain and Southern Rhodesia.

== Climate ==
Like most of the United Kingdom, the Inverness area has an oceanic climate (Köppen: Cfb).

The weather is pleasantly warm and sunny in the spring and summer, cool and fairly rainy in the autumn and very cold and snowy (with some blizzards) in the winter.

Police imposed speed restrictions on many bridges as fallen trees and a landslip both caused problems on the A82 near Drumnadrochit in the November 2010.

== Attractions ==
Glen Urquhart has a mixture of planted, conifer forest and native, broadleaved woodlands. The hillsides on the south side of the glen are mainly used for commercial forestry, managed by the Forestry Commission. The slopes on the opposite side are covered with a mixture of deciduous woodland (mainly birch), farmland and some areas of commercial forestry. There are waymarked walks in Craigmonie woodland, near Drumnadrochit at the foot of the glen. A network of forest roads all along the glen is suitable for walking, cycling and horse-riding.

Deer hunting (stalking) is a popular recreational and cultural experience here, bringing international visitors from around the world.

A Corrimony chambered cairn, west of the village, is a Bronze Age burial monument is part of the Clava group of cairns.

The local shinty team is called Glenurquhart Shinty Club.

== See also ==
- Fort Augustus
- Charles Kennedy MP
- November 2010 European Windstorms
- Glen plaid
- Glen Urquhart School
