= Cyclone Carmen =

November 2010 windstorm

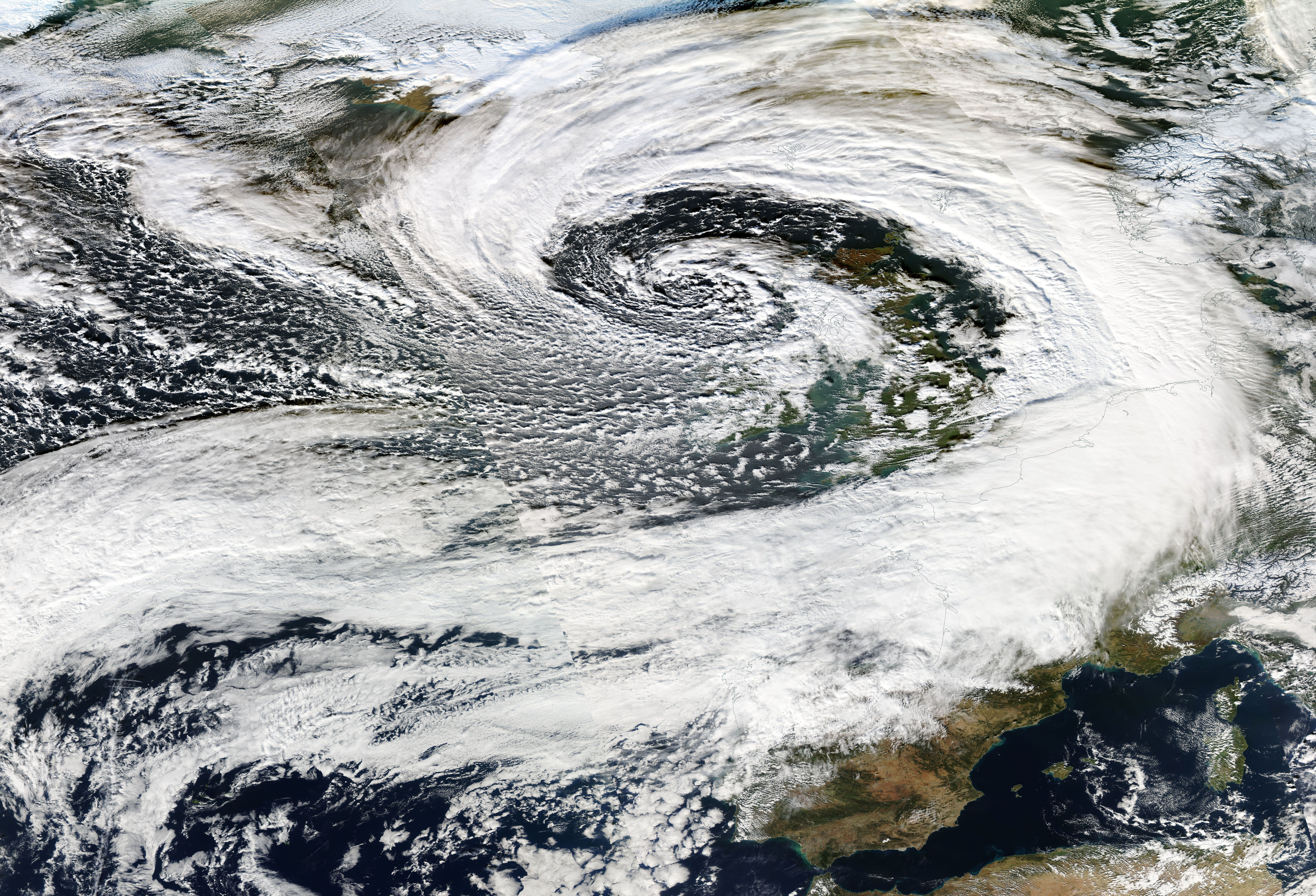
- Carmen over the British Isles on 11 November 2010.

Meteorological history
- Formed: 7 November 2010
- Dissipated: 19 November 2010

Extratropical cyclone
- Lowest pressure: 948 mb (28.0 inHg)

Overall effects
- Fatalities: 13
- Areas affected: Northern Europe

Cyclone Carmen (or Windstorm Carmen) was an extratropical cyclone and European windstorm which crossed the Atlantic Ocean and affected the United Kingdom, Ireland, France, Belgium, and the Netherlands in November 2010.

== Meteorological history ==
Windstorm Carmen formed as a low-pressure system off the east coast of the United States.

By 9 November, while over Nova Scotia, the system was named "Carmen" as it passed into the North Atlantic near and over southern Greenland, Iceland, and the Faroe Islands, which had been suffering from the lesser windstorm Becky since the 5th. Becky died out over Denmark and Northern Germany on the 12th, and its remnants joined windstorm Carmen over Russia on the 14th. Due to a strong pressure gradient, gale-force winds were recorded in the United Kingdom. A 91 mph (146 km/h) wind gust was recorded at Capel Curig, Wales.

Traveling eastward, Carmen eventually attained a central pressure of 949 millibars as it struck the United Kingdom. At 06:00 UTC on Friday, 12 November 2010, Carmen was over the North Sea, east of Scotland, with a central pressure of approximately 965 mb (965 hPa). Carmen was last noted over western Russia on 14 November 2010, as it continued to weaken, and had burnt itself out over the Former Yugoslavia, Eastern Europe, Moscow, and the Gulf of Finland between 18 and 19 November 2010.

== Impact ==
=== 8 November ===
High winds and rough seas battered the western coastline of Ireland on the nights of 7–8 November 2010. Heavy sleet and rain fell across the Irish Republic, Northern Ireland, coastal Lancashire, Cumbria, and coastal Wales on the 8 November. Minor spot floods hit part of the Salthill promenade in Galway, with traffic diverted through the Salthill village as Assistant Commissioner John Twomey warned of strong winds and debris making driving conditions difficult in Ireland.

==== Ireland ====
The storm grew in intensity, and a heavy band of rain hit Western Ireland on the morning of 8 November 2010, then Wales and Wessex between 04:00 and 07:00 UTC. By 09:00 UTC, the rain had reached most of England, Wales, and western Scotland. Minor flooding was reported in Oxfordshire over Radio Oxford, and the Channel Islands and Normandy's Cotentin peninsula were also hit. The heaviest rainfall was over patches of southwest Ireland, Pembrokeshire, Bristol, Dumfriesshire, Morecambe Bay, Carlisle, central Lancashire, Sussex, Surrey, parts of the English Channel, and Cherbourg.

A crash in County Galway killed two people due to weather-related road conditions. Another fatal nighttime road accident occurred on the Mountmellick to Emo road at Knightstown, Mountmellick, in which a male cyclist was fatally injured after being hit by a car.

A Brazilian man from the English Midlands drowned in a car accident that morning on the Offaly–Westmeath border. His car skidded off the road between Rhode and Rochfortbridge, hit a roadside bank, and rolled on its roof into the flood-swollen water of the River Monagh on the 8th.

The water levels at Galway Docks and the Claddagh Basin rose violently in the evening as extensive sand-bagging was put in place at the Spanish Arch, Quay Street and Flood Street for the short term. County Cork was hit by minor flooding, and the owners of Penrose Quay feared heavy tidal flooding of the quay as wind and waves sloshed against it menacingly at evening high tide.

Gardaí Assistant Commissioner Twomey said in a press interview: "Sadly, so far this year over 190 people were killed on the national roads. 35 people were killed during October, making it one of the worst months for fatalities since February 2008". He went on to warn of the hazards caused by decreasing seasonal daylight and a greater chance of encountering wet and slippery road surfaces. In County Galway a van and a bus carrying 27 students from County Mayo to Limerick skidded on groundwater and crashed at Glenafosha outside Tuam just after 7:30 pm, killing both drivers and injuring 12 of the students.

==== Northern Ireland ====
High winds, driving rain, and occasional snow hit Northern Ireland. Ice, floods and fallen trees affected most roads. Gale-force winds ripped through Downpatrick and County Londonderry overnight. The Foyle Bridge in the city of Derry was closed to high-sided vehicles due to high winds.

The Glenshane Pass was cleared of snow and gritted, but there were 22 incidents of flooding on roads overnight. Roads throughout the country were closed due to fallen trees and flooding.

==== England and France ====
In England a major HSE rail investigation was launched after a morning commuter train skidded along Charing Cross to Hastings line on wet leaves. The train from Charing Cross sped through one station at 65 mph (105 km/h); the terrified driver immediately contacted signal control center to raise the alarm as his train skidded down the track for 2 mi (3.2 km), after he braked when approaching Stonegate railway station in East Sussex.

At midday the Met office issued a severe weather alert for the whole UK as Britain was battered by 70 mph winds (110 km/h), with snow in the north of England and up to 3 inches (76 mm) of rain across the east Midlands, south and south east. There were gusts of 65 mph (105 km/h) at Berry Head in Devon and 60 mph (97 km/h) in Dundrennan, Dumfries and Galloway. High winds and waves battered Whitley Bay in North Tyneside and gale-force winds hit parts of London, Penbrokeshire and the Pennines. Weather overnight caused much chaos in the UK, and periodic gale-force northerly winds hit most of the UK at some time during the night. The worst-affected areas were the northwest and southeast tips of England.

On the evening of the 8th, 28-year-old kitesurfer Adrien Monnoyeur from Toulouse ignored safety warnings and was killed as a gale in the Saint Jean de Luz resort, near Biarritz in southwest France, dragged him at 100 mph (160 km/h) across the beach and fatally slammed him down from 50 ft (15 m) in the air onto the beach, after hitting the Grand Hotel and a local pier en route.

Winds on the 8 November had top speeds of 65 mph (105 km/h). A weather warning was issued for parts of south-east and south-west England, due to up to 70mm of predicted rain overnight. Fourteen flood warnings were in place for Wales, the English Midlands and North East England, and a severe weather warning for parts of south Wales.

==== Scotland ====
The Northlink ferry MV Hjaltland was due to dock in Aberdeen, but was diverted to Rosyth as Aberdeen harbour was closed for 18 hours over the 8th and 9th.

Snow was a problem in the Highlands and on high roads such as the A9 at Drumochter in the Scottish Highlands and on the M74 north of Moffat in Dumfries and Galloway. Heavy rain replaced earlier snow in Aberdeen, Braemar and Dumfries and Galloway. Snow fell continuously at the Cairngorm Mountain resort and the A93 Glenshee to Braemar road was closed because of drifting snow and high winds as blizzards were reported around Dumfries.

The storm had mostly ended in Ireland, Wales and Wessex by 20:00, but had intensified over Northern Ireland and Ayrshire. It remained in several scattered, but heavy bands across the British Isles, with only County Antrim, Perthshire, Glasgow, Edinburgh, County Durham, Cumbria, Lancashire, Norfolk, Berkshire, southern Hampshire, Surrey and Sussex being badly affected from through the night.

=== 9 November ===
On the 9th, 9 flood warnings and 33 flood watches were still in effect in the UK. Heavy thunderstorms continued in some areas but mostly died out through the afternoon.

Snow was a bigger problem, occurring in the English Midlands and Scotland. Vehicles had to be rescued in Cumbria and Wessex, with many road closures.

Train, ferry and some air services were also affected by high winds.

=== 10–11 November ===
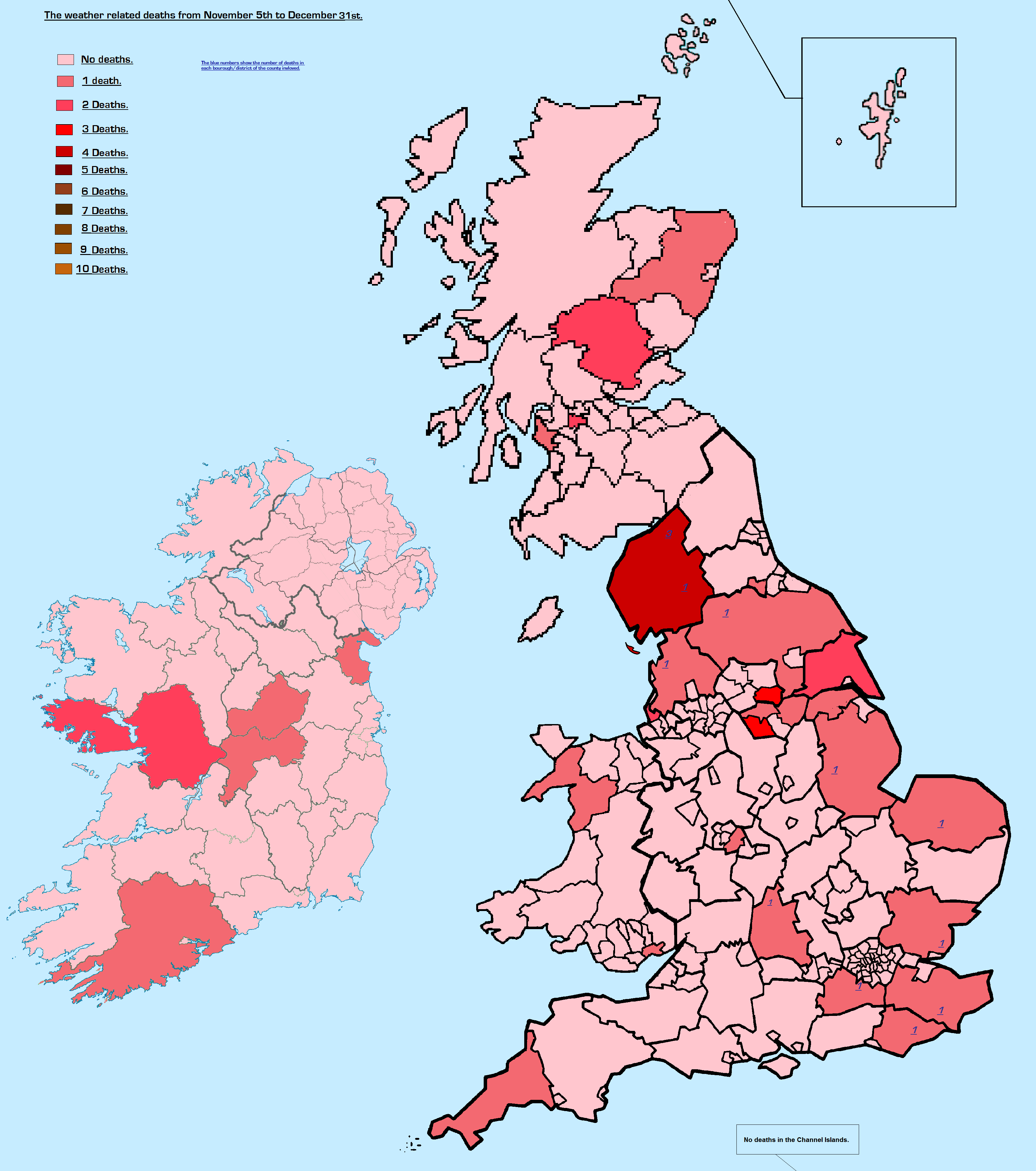
This image shows the number of fatalities in the British Isles caused by storms from November 8th to December 31st. See file page for map key.

A new band of heavy rain moved eastward over the UK and Ireland on the 10th. This second storm complex moved rapidly overnight on the 10th and 11th, with thunderstorms and torrential rain being reported near Bristol, parts of central Ireland and from central Scotland to the English North Midlands. It reached Belgium and left Ireland, Wessex, and Wales by 10:00 on the 11th. The only gale-force winds in the second system were in coastal areas, with heavy rainfall causing limited flooding.

Donegal was worst hit in Ireland, with isolated flooding occurring throughout Ireland and Northern Ireland. The Irish Farmers Association reported that the River Shannon burst its banks in numerous places. Several roads were blocked by fallen trees across the island, causing disruption to road travel.

=== 12–13 November ===
==== UK and Ireland ====
The heaviest rainfall recorded on the weekend of 12 November was 29 mm in 12 hours in Shap, Cumbria, while Lancashire and Yorkshire saw 7–10 mm in the same period. The Isle of Wight, which had suffered flooding earlier in the week, was flooded again due to heavy rains with 100 homes affected. At Aberdaron in Gwynedd, Wales, a 36 m/s (130 km/h) wind gust was reported on 12 November. Downed trees and unsafe structures were also a problem in Wales in the aftermath of earlier storms. Widespread rainfall and some heavy winds occurred throughout the afternoon.

Winds were strongest in coastal and elevated locations, with gusts generally in the range of 27–31 m/s (97–113 km/h) and up to 40 m/s (140 km/h; 89 mph) in some areas or even 160 km/h (99 mph) according to some reports. In one case, a falling tree struck and killed a motorist in Yorkshire. Another woman died in Pinderfield's Hospital after being impaled by a tree branch during winds of up to 90 mph in Pontefract, West Yorkshire.

Some had to evacuate their homes in this period, and aircraft had to be diverted from Leeds Bradford International Airport when gusts reached 100 mph. Flights and ferry crossings to the Isle of Man were also cancelled. A wind speed of 100 mph (160 km/h) was recorded on Great Dun Fell in the Pennines.

The worst-hit places in this period were the Isle of Wight, Anglesey, Northern Ireland, North West England, Yorkshire and the Humber. Blackpool Tower suffered structural damage and surrounding roads were closed. A paving slab hit a fairground ride in Bridlington, causing £30,000 worth of damage. Approximately 5,000 people were left without electricity in Northern Ireland.

==== Belgium, Germany, and the Netherlands ====
On November 12, many Belgian rivers and canals rose above the national alarm level, with some of their defenses failing. Four deaths occurred over the weekend in Belgium.

A third weather band drifted up from off the coast of Brittany and hit southwest Ireland, Cornwall and Normandy's Cotinian Peninsula at 07:00 on the 12th, moving inland. Gusts of 62 mph hit the coast of northwest England that morning. A heavily loaded fishing boat capsized in the Baltic Sea, but the captain, who was alone, was safely rescued.

Beyond some flooding and snowfall, the original storm had mainly dissipated by Friday evening.

In continental Europe, high winds caused the Karneval festivities in Cologne and elsewhere in the Rhineland to be cut short. The St. Martin's Day procession was cancelled in Aachen and minor flooding and high winds occurred in various parts of Germany, but no one was injured.

Two people died in southern Belgium, according to Dutch and RTBF. A man was washed away in a street and a 72-year-old woman was killed in her car. Both fatalities occurred during the night of the 13 November, in the community of Solre-Saint-Géry, part of Beaumont, near the French border. By the afternoon another body was found in nearby Lessines.

Firefighters worked desperately to patch up polders, dykes, and river defences in Germany. Road and rail traffic were disrupted, but quickly restored. Emergency teams reinforced dams, dykes, bridges and canal/river banks, relieving the firefighters.

Belgian weather experts and state authorities described the flooding in that country as the worst in 50 years. The national weather service said Belgium had as much rainfall in two days (13th and 14th) as it normally gets in a month. Belgium was badly flooded and Liège was cut off on the 14th. The flood defences failed in places.

The River Dendre flooded Brussels heavily, reaching 46 cm above alarm level along with several canals on 14 November. 200 houses were evacuated. The Meuse basin also rose 2 metres above the mean level.

Floods and heavy rainfall also began in the Netherlands on the 14th.

Heavy rains flooded out the centre of the seaside town of Granville in northern France after 2 inches of rain fell on the region within 24 hours, according to Radio France Internationale. At least one death occurred in Granville during the storm.

=== 15–16 November ===
Further flooding and mudslides occurred in Belgium on the 15th. One person was swept away by the floods as she tried to cross a bridge in the south. Army rescue teams helped with emergency evacuations, including a hospital, as many of Belgian's roads were blocked or flooded. Several Belgian regions put disaster emergency plans into operation as a canal burst its banks in several places near Brussels leading to more than 200 houses being evacuated and a pharmaceutical factory closed down due to local flooding.

Though the weather had improved, flooding remained a problem in Belgium. A staggering 80 litres per square metre were recorded in a few locations. Despite the 4 deaths and heavy material losses involved, the Belgian government refused to take any responsibility for the state's lack of preparedness for flooding. Both the heavily flooded southern Netherlands and wind-ravaged Luxembourg had no deaths at all in the same period.

In the Netherlands, the River Maas broke its banks, causing flooding in several towns. In Limburg, even hilly regions were affected. In the east of North Brabant province, the local water board deliberately flooded fields the size of 50 football pitches to keep the river from rupturing its crumbling embankments. At the town of Baarlo, three rivers rose from 2 to 50 meters at their junction and ran through the town on the 15th. Luxembourg was affected by the same weather complex, but received little, if any damage. Similar scenes occurred in the north of Par.

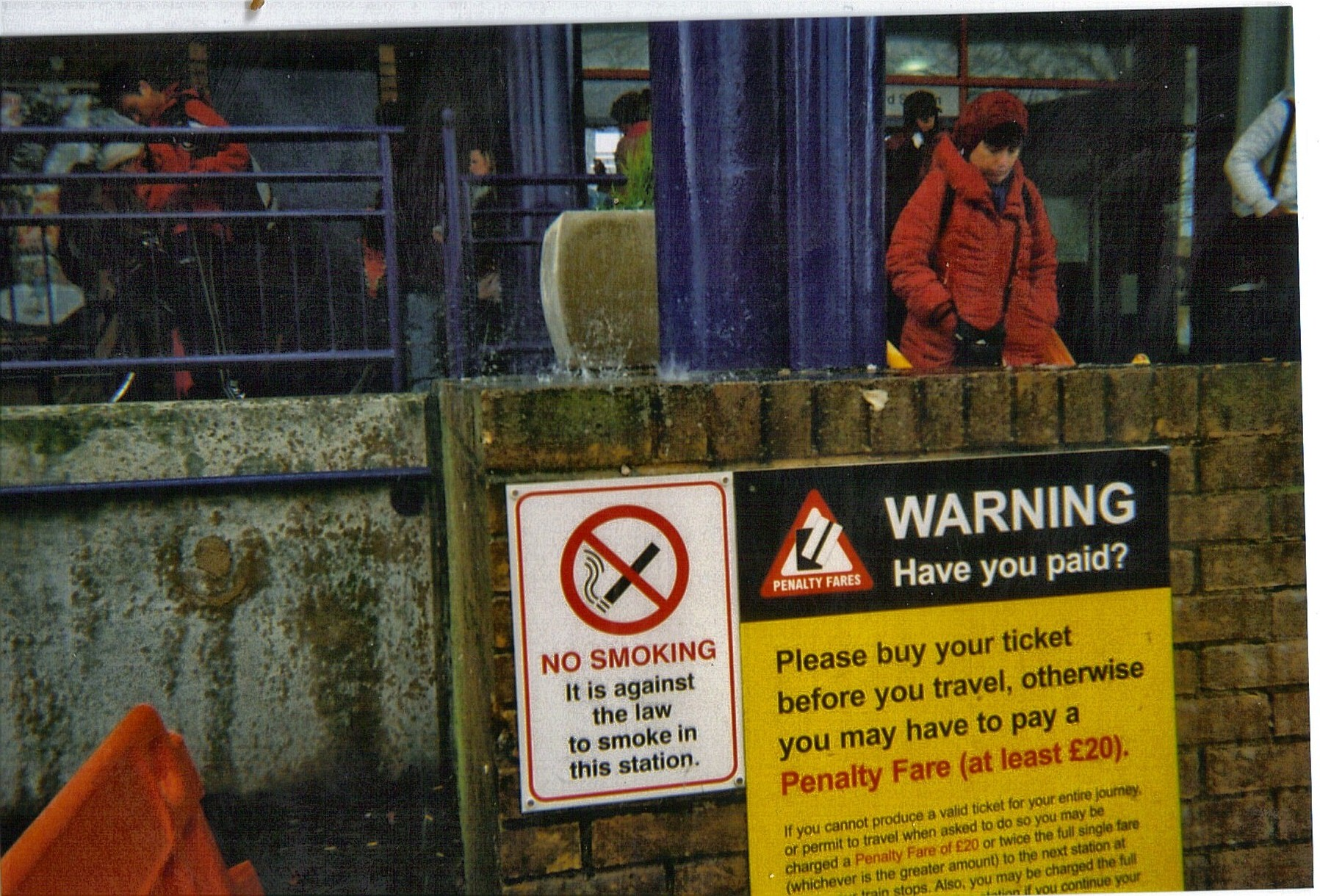
Rain pours down at Oxford station on Nov 16th.

=== 17 November ===
A new band of rain and thunderstorms hit the UK and Ireland on the 17th. Parts of France and the coast of Portugal experienced heavy storms on that day as well, as did the Bay of Biscay and Iceland.

On the 17th, Prime Minister David Cameron pledged to send aid to Cornwall, still experiencing heavy rains and gale-force winds. Luxulyan, Both police and Ben Johnston, flood risk manager for the Environment Agency, declared the flooding a "major incident" with hundreds of residents evacuated. Schools were closed and the transport network was hugely disrupted with interruption of train services and motorists urged not to drive in Cornwall.

By mid afternoon the rain had lessened and police and military worked together with a helicopter to rescue people from their cars and houses in Cornwall. A heavy mudslide near Lostwithiel cut off local roads and water completely surrounded the village of Mevagissey, which was evacuated. Pentewan residents dubbed a £1,300,000 flood relief scheme approved by the Environment Agency "money down the drain."

In Belgium, the rivers Nete, Demer, and Ijzer had risen to danger level. Storms continued over parts of Europe into the evening.

=== 18–21 November ===
Belgium continued to experience heavy rains, and both Belgium and Cornwall continued to be on flood alert. Prince Charles visited the Cornish villages of St Austell, Lostwithiel and St Blazey between the 19th and the 21st, pledging financial aid for the people of Cornwall.

Prime Minister Cameron visited Lostwithial and St Blazey on the 19th, denying that he had misled Parliament when he said flood protection money had been safeguarded in the spending review. He also denied having alluded to plans to reform flood relief financing.

Storms moved to Scandinavia, most of Eastern Europe, some parts of Central Europe, the Balkans, Kyiv, Moscow and Morocco by the 19th. Though the weather had cleared in the UK, heavy storms continued to hit the western coast of Ireland, Dublin, and Northern Ireland on the night of the 18th and morning of the 19th. Flooding and traffic disruption continued in Northern Ireland through the 19th, with main roads flooded out.

Becky and Carmen died off in northwest Russia by the 20th.

== Aftermath ==
The floods came at a politically delicate time for the UK as its coalition government reneged on a long-held pledge to protect flood defences from government imposed spending cuts. This included a £100,000,000 plan to protect Leeds, though the £14,250,000 Banbury flood prevention scheme would continue. Total relief funds were cut from £335,000,000 a year to £261,000,000 for the next 4 years despite climate change Secretary Chris Huhne saying that extreme weather would become more common over time. There were also plans to build permanent flood defences in Upton-upon-Severn, Worcestershire at an estimated cost of £4,500,000. In Ireland, on the other hand, flooding policies helped reduce storm-related damage.

Several businesses in Lostwithiel were badly damaged by the mudslide there. Mud ruined several £3,000 ball gowns in a clothes shop, and a bakery was destroyed. The repairs and flood defences were estimated to cost millions of pounds and take about a year to complete.

European insurers agreed on 25 October that they needed to hold up to 37,000,000 euros ($51,480,000) of extra capital under new fiscal solvency rules to cover potential losses from windstorm damage in Europe, in the light of events such as Windstorm Emma, according to loss and exposure aggregator PERILS. Windstorms are expected to increase in air pressure and strength over Europe and the Americas over the next 5–10 years.

The Eurowind probabilistic risk assessment model that quantifies the prospective risk from windstorms in Europe and is part of WORLDCATenterprise, EQECAT's catastrophe-event-modelling software platform, and would be used to calculate future prospective windstorm and flooding losses.

The Cloud-Aerosol Lidar and Infrared Pathfinder Satellite Observation (CALIPSO) and CloudSat satellite would be used to assess the extent of any future storms as they first emerge in the atmosphere.

The insurance company AXA sponsored a three-year-long €275 million catastrophe bond from 2 November 2, 2010 to cover European windstorm risks in the event of a disaster like Windstorm Emma earlier that decade. The nations covered by the bond scheme are Belgium, Denmark, France, Germany, Ireland, Luxembourg, the Netherlands, Switzerland, and the United Kingdom.

Axa closed its upsized €275,000,000 catastrophe bond on 2 November to cover itself against potential losses from European windstorms, after upsizing the insurance bond twice in 2010 to meet heavy investor demand. The Irish firm Calypso Capital will be used to cover against potential windstorm insurance claims in its nine Western European member countries between 1 January 2011 and 1 January 2014.

== See also ==
- Other storms of the same name
- Windstorm Emma
