= John McLeod =

John McLeod may refer to:

== Politics ==
- John McLeod (New Brunswick politician) (1825–?), shipbuilder and assembly member
- John McLeod (New Zealand politician) (1825–1883), MP for Mongonui
- John McLeod (Ontario politician) (1833–1879), member of the Ontario legislature
- John McLeod (Canada West politician) (1816–1887), merchant, shipbuilder and politician in Canada West
- John R. McLeod (1872–1931), politician from Alberta

== Sports ==
- John McLeod (basketball) (born 1934), Canadian basketball player
- John McLeod (Jamaican cricketer) (born 1931), Jamaican cricketer
- John McLeod (New Zealand cricketer) (born 1947), New Zealand cricketer
- John McLeod (footballer, born 1866) (1866–1953), Scottish football goalkeeper (Dumbarton FC and Scotland)
- John McLeod (footballer, born 1888) (1888 – after 1912), Scottish football full back (Inverness Caledonian, Bury and Darlington)
- Jackie McLeod (1930–2022), Canadian ice hockey player and coach
- Jack McLeod (rugby league), New Zealand international
- John McLeod (rugby league) (born 1957), Australian rugby league player

== Other ==
- John McLeod (explorer) (1795–?), Canadian fur trader and explorer
- John McLeod (composer) (1934–2022), Scottish composer
- John Macleod (songwriter), or McLeod, songwriting partner of Tony Macaulay
- John Bryce McLeod (1929–2014), British mathematician
- John P. McLeod, Australian writer and broadcaster
- John McLeod (card game researcher) (born 1949), English card game historian and researcher
- Sir John Chetham McLeod, Scottish British Army officer and colonial administrator
- John McLeod (surgeon), Scottish naval surgeon and author
- Jack McLeod (political scientist) (John Tennyson McLeod, 1932–2016), Canadian economist and writer

== See also ==
- John MacLeod (disambiguation)
- Jack McLeod (disambiguation)
- John McLeod Campbell (1800–1872), Scottish minister
- John McLeod Murphy (1827–1871), U.S. naval officer during the American Civil War
