= List of former cathedrals in Great Britain =

This is a list of former or once proposed cathedrals in Great Britain.

== Introduction ==
The term former cathedral in this list includes any Christian church (building) in Great Britain which has been the seat of a bishop, but is not so any longer. The status of a cathedral, for the purpose of this list, does not depend on whether the church concerned is known to have had a formal "throne" (or cathedra) nor whether a formal territory or diocese was attached to the church or bishop concerned. Before the development of dioceses, which began earlier in England than in Scotland and Wales, "such bishops as there were either lived in monasteries or were 'wandering bishops'". This list, therefore, includes early "bishop's churches" (a "proto-cathedral" is similar).

A former cathedral may be the building that lost its cathedral status or its site, whether now vacant or not. The loss of status may be because that bishopric is extinct, or was relocated. Sometimes a new cathedral was built near an older one, with the older building then used for other purposes, or demolished. Such a building or site counts as a former cathedral. Where a cathedral is modified or rebuilt on substantially the same site in a series of developments over time, the earlier versions are not counted here as former cathedrals (except for cases where the original cathedral was totally rebuilt on broadly the same site but on a visibly different alignment, such as London's "Old St Paul's" and Winchester's "Old Minster" which are listed here).

A former pro-cathedral is a church or former church (or site of a former church) which was once a designated temporary cathedral officially performing that role until completion of a new cathedral built for that purpose.

A once proposed cathedral is a church that was proposed (usually by a church or civil authority) as a future cathedral but, for some reason, did not become one. Known examples will be included in this list. Sometimes a second such proposal for the same church succeeded: as long as that church retains its cathedral status it will not feature in this List.

Entries contain information drawn from other Wikipedia articles and from (cited) other sources. Some entries include (in the Name column) references to 'Site' and 'Status'. In most cases there is no doubt about the site occupied by a former cathedral, nor its status as the former seat of a bishop. In a few cases the site is unknown within a limited area ('uncertain') or over a wide area ('unknown'). In a few cases, it is not entirely clear whether the location was historically the seat of a bishop (or, for a once proposed cathedral, had been seriously considered for elevation to cathedral status). Status 'uncertain' in such cases suggests some doubt, while 'doubtful' suggests considerable doubt.

For information on current cathedrals in Great Britain please refer to:
List of cathedrals in England, or List of cathedrals in Scotland, or List of cathedrals in Wales, as appropriate.

== England ==
References are to the English church's current use or its use prior to deconsecration.

=== Former cathedrals founded before 1066 ===
survivors becoming Church of England at the Reformation (1540)

Location	Image	Name	Dates	Notes	Coordinates
Bradwell-on-Sea, Essex		Chapel of St Peter-on-the-Wall; original dedication uncertain	654 – 664	Founded by St Cedd in 653 after a mission to the East Saxons from London by St Mellitus failed in c. 616. Cedd's chosen site was the former Roman Saxon Shore fort of Othona. A stone cathedral was built of Roman materials, but Cedd died in 664. A third mission in c. 675, by St Erkenwald from London succeeded. After centuries as a chapel-of-ease, then as a barn (when it lost its original W porch and E (chancel) apse, and had a large hole cut through its S wall for access), the structure was restored and re-consecrated in 1920. Served from its parish church, it is in regular use.	51°44′07″N 0°56′24″E
Canterbury, Kent		St Martin's Church, Canterbury	597 – 602	Claimed as the oldest church in continuous use in the English-speaking world; parts date from before the 5th-century Roman withdrawal from Britain. It was used for Christian worship from c. 580, and after St Augustine landed in 597 he used it as his proto-cathedral while his new cathedral was being built. St Martin's has since been a parish church.	51.277989°N 1.093825°E
Chester-le-Street, County Durham		Collegiate Church of St Mary and St Cuthbert	c. 883 – c. 995	Having been driven from the monastic diocesan see of Lindisfarne by Viking raids in 875, the monks journeyed widely carrying the body of St Cuthbert and other relics. In 883 they settled at the site of the Roman fort of Concangis. Land was granted to them by Guthred, and they built a wooden church within the Roman fort to house both Cuthbert's relics and the cathedra of the bishop. In 995, fear of renewed raids caused the community to flee again, (via Ripon) finally to Durham. The current church was built from 1056 on the site of the wooden cathedral, and was restored c. 1883 for the 1,000th anniversary of the monks' arrival.	54.855944°N 1.571972°W
Crediton, Devon		Collegiate Church of the Holy Cross and the Mother of Him Who Hung Thereon	909 – 1050	A purported charter of 739 by King Æthelheard of Wessex granted land here to Forthhere (d. 737) for a monastery. A new see, for Devon and Cornwall, was created in the early 10th century out of the diocese of Sherborne, possibly first at Tawton, but certainly by 909 at Crediton. The cathedral of St Mary was replaced, after the see moved to Exeter in 1050, by a new collegiate church, probably on the same site, dedicated by 1237 to the Holy Cross and St Mary.	50°47′22.70″N 3°39′8.21″W
Dinuurrin, (Bodmin), Cornwall		site uncertain; dedication unknown	9th century	Dinuurrin is a placename known to us only as the seat of the early Cornish bishop Kenstec, who sometime between 833 and 870 declared his obedience to Canterbury. There are reasons to believe the site was on high ground at the northern edge of Bodmin, as this is. The early 16th-century Guild Chapel of the Holy Rood was built in such a place, but fell into ruin after the reformation – only the roofless shell of its tower (shown), now known as "Berry Tower", remains. The site is ancient and had high status (the chapel unusually enjoyed rights of baptism and burial), and it is thought likely that Kenstec's seat was here. Amid cemeteries, it can be reached from Cross Lane.	50.47525°N 4.71791°W
Dommoc, Suffolk		site unknown; dedication unknown	c. 630 – c. 850	Several locations have been suggested for the Anglo-Saxon see of East Anglia, founded by St Felix, notably two sites long lost to the sea by coastal erosion: (1) Dunwich, a once-important medieval town now submerged, but of doubtful 7th-century importance; (2) the old Roman Saxon Shore fort of Walton Castle, now off the coast at Felixstowe. Attention has shifted towards Walton as the more likely of these two sites. The diocese was split in c. 673, with an additional see created at Elmham. The list of Dommoc bishops ended with the Viking invasions of c. 850. Two sets of co-ordinates are offered: one, very approximate, for Dunwich; the second for Walton's offshore masonry remains.	52°16′10″N 1°41′11″E 51°58′22″N 1°22′48″E
Dorchester on Thames, Oxfordshire		Abbey Church of St Peter & St Paul, Dorchester	635 – c. 660; then c. 675 – 737; and c. 875 – 1072	The first West Saxon see was founded here c. 635, translated to Winchester c. 660. It later became a Mercian bishopric twice: firstly, in c. 675 until merged into the medieval diocese of Leicester c. 737, secondly, in c. 875 when the sees of Leicester and Lindsey were translated here due to Viking attacks. The Dorchester see was translated to Lincoln in 1072. The secular canons of 635–1140 were replaced by Augustinian canons. After the dissolution in 1536 the chancel of the abbey church was bought by Richard Beauforest and then in 1555 it passed to the parish, the whole then became the parish church. There is a 14th-century Jesse window, and a reconstructed shrine to St Birinus.	51°38′37″N 1°09′51″W
Durham, County Durham		The White Church (Alba Ecclesia) (almost certainly dedicated to St Cuthbert)	c. 998 – c. 1104	Late in the 10th century the community of St Cuthbert, fearing more Viking attacks, left Chester-le-Street. Bearing St Cuthbert's body they arrived in 995 at Durham, a secure site. After using wooden buildings, in 998 they began a stone (so "white") church to house Cuthbert's relics. This cruciform Anglo-Saxon cathedral, with a central and a western tower. was completed c. 1020. In 1083 the second Norman bishop, William, suppressed the community of St Cuthbert, replacing them with Benedictine monks. so Durham became a cathedral priory, and in 1093 Bishop William began building the Norman cathedral that underlies today's Durham Cathedral. By 1104 progress allowed the transfer of Cuthbert's relics from The White Church, which was then demolished. Its foundations lie beneath the cloister garth (shown) among the monastic buildings just south of the present cathedral, to which the coordinates relate.	54°46′24″N 1°34′36″W
Elmham, Norfolk		dedication unknown	c. 673 – c. 850; and c. 950 – 1071	The see of Elmham, probably to be identified with North Elmham, was created c. 673 when the East Anglian diocese, with its see at Dommoc, was split. The list of Elmham bishops was interrupted in c. 850 owing to Viking raids. The see, restored c. 950, was translated to Thetford in 1071. Church remains, in the hands of English Heritage, date from c. 1100 (the earlier cathedral was probably wooden).	52°45′20″N 0°56′41″E
Exeter, Devon		Minster of St Mary and St Peter	1050 – c.1133	From a 7th-century monastery, the Minster of Saint Mary and Saint Peter became the seat of Bishop Leofric when the see of Crediton was translated to Exeter in 1050. The dual dedication may mean the minster comprised two churches, and if so the surviving church of St Mary was a part of the former cathedral. A Norman cathedral was begun in 1114 just east of St Mary's and took the dedication to St Peter (and perhaps St Peter's site), while to the west St Mary's served local people. By 1222 it had become the parish church of St Mary Major (upper image). It was demolished in 1865. The finial from the steeple of its replacement (demolished 1971) is sited on the cathedral green to show where the tower of that church once stood (lower image).	50°43′21″N 3°31′47″W
Hexham, Northumberland		Priory and Parish Church of St Andrew, Hexham	678 – c. 821	In 678 Archbishop St Theodore divided the diocese of York, appointing Eata as Bishop of Bernicia with his seat at Hexham Abbey (founded by St Wilfrid in 674) and/or Lindisfarne Abbey. However, in 682 a separate bishopric was created here with a diocese covering "the district between the rivers Aln and Tees". Appointments to the see continued erratically until the diocese reverted into the Diocese of Lindisfarne in 821. In 875 Vikings razed the abbey to the ground. From 1113 an Augustinian Priory used the site (dissolved 1537). Since then the priory church has been a parish church, the east end rebuilt in 1858 and a rebuilt nave completed in 1908. An early bishop's cathedra survives in the form of a frithstool (foreground of the 2nd image) as does St Wilfrid's 7th-century crypt (3rd image).	54°58′17″N 2°06′10″W
Hoxne, Suffolk		Church of St Peter and St Paul, with St Edmund	c. 926 – c. 952 or later	In 926 the new Bishop of London, Theodred, was also given episcopal authority over Suffolk and Norfolk. He founded a new see here, probably at the church dedicated (certainly since 1101) to SS Peter & Paul rather than a nearby Hoxne church of St Æthelberht. At this time the 7th-century East Anglian sees of Dommoc and Elmham had been in abeyance since c. 850 due to Viking attacks. Theodred died c. 952, after the see of Elmham had been restored so his former see was subsumed in it. His former cathedral church at Hoxne remained collegiate until at least the death of Bishop Ælfric II in 1038 and seems to have retained the status of a second cathedral for East Anglia since Hoxne was still the see for Suffolk into the reign of St Edward the Confessor or later. The 14th-century parish church likely occupies the same site.	52.352192°N 1.201719°E
Leicester, Leicestershire		St Nicholas' Church, Leicester; site probable; original dedication unknown	679 – 874?	The Diocese of Lichfield was divided by 679 into four, including one for the Middle Angles at Leicester. The site of the 7th-century cathedral here is very likely that of St Nicholas' Church, with clear early Anglo-Saxon origins and using Roman materials. It stands between the sites of the Roman baths and forum. Overrun by Danes c.875 the see was suppressed and merged with Dorchester on Thames. St Nicholas' is now a parish church. The modern Diocese of Leicester was created in 1927 (out of Peterborough), with the 12th-century church of St Martin its cathedral.	52.635147°N 1.140914°W
Lindisfarne, Northumberland		Church of St Mary the Virgin, Lindisfarne; original dedication unknown	635 – 875	A monastery was founded in 635 by King Oswald for St Aidan as the site for a cathedral for the northern part of the kingdom of Northumbria. Viking raids from 793 led to its destruction in 875. The community fled, with the relics of St Cuthbert, settling at Chester-le-Street in 883, then Durham in 995. The see was translated to Durham, which founded a sub-priory here in 1083, its church being dedicated to St Peter (dissolved 1537). Priory ruins (upper image) are in the care of English Heritage. The parish church of St Mary the Virgin (lower image) stands near the priory ruins on the site of Aidan's wooden cathedral.	55.669389°N 1.801922°W
London (City of), London		Old St Paul's Cathedral, London	604 – 1666	This former cathedral, begun by the Normans in 1087, followed a series of three, all probably wooden, Anglo-Saxon cathedrals dedicated to St Paul, built in 604, c.675, and c.962 (all destroyed by fire, in c.616, 962 (by Vikings), and 1087, respectively). This stone-built cathedral was destroyed by fire in 1666, and replaced by the extant cathedral, built 1675–1710 on a different alignment in a very different architectural style. A 1561 illustration is shown, with a ground plan (East is to the right in both).	51.513611°N 0.098333°E
Padstow, Cornwall		St Petroc's Church	518 – 564?	By tradition Saint Petroc landed in 518 at Trebetherick, near what became Padstow (Petroc-stow = holy place of Petroc) after his death. He succeeded the hermit-bishop Wethinoc, who had founded a monastery. Petroc named it Lanwethinoc and its church became Petroc's cathedral for Cornwall. He died there c.564. A Viking attack razed the monastery in 981, so the monks moved to Bodmin, with Petroc's relics. The parish church dates from the 15th century but is believed to occupy the original monastic site.	50.541269°N 4.942856°W
Ramsbury, Wiltshire		Church of the Holy Cross, Ramsbury; site probable; original dedication unknown	909 – 1058	The Ramsbury bishopric was created for Wiltshire in 909 out of the Diocese of Winchester, but in 1058 it was united with the Diocese of Sherborne to form the Diocese of Salisbury, with its see then at Old Sarum. The former Ramsbury Cathedral is thought to have been where the 13th-century parish church of the Holy Cross now stands.	51°26′31″N 1°36′22″W
Repton, Derbyshire		St Wystan's church; original dedication uncertain	c. 655 – 669	A 7th-century double monastery of Celtic origin here provided the supposed original see for Mercia. Four bishops of Mercia are named, before St Chad moved the see to Lichfield when he became bishop in 669, though they may have been peripatetic (having no defined territory). The monastery was destroyed when a Danish army over-wintered here in 873/4, though the c. 720 crypt of the abbey church (shown), survived and was used for Mercian royal burials. An Augustinian priory, founded c. 1158 and dedicated to St Wystan (dissolved 1538) used the site. Now a parish church, traces of priory buildings exist in adjacent Repton School (1559).	52.84115°N 1.551695°W
St Germans, Cornwall		Priory Church of St Germanus	early 10th century – c. 1027	King Æthelstan (of England (which by then included Cornwall) from 927-939 appointed Conan as Bishop of Cornwall in c.936, with his see at St Germans. Some earlier bishops of Cornwall (after Kenstec) were probably also based here. Lyfing, Bishop of Crediton, became additionally Bishop of Cornwall in c.1027, uniting the two sees at Crediton. The former cathedral at St Germans became collegiate c.1050, then an Augustinian priory founded c.1184 (dissolved 1539), leaving a parish church with some Norman fabric.	50°23′48″N 4°18′35″W
Selsey, Sussex		Selsey Abbey; site uncertain; dedication unclear	c. 681 – c.1075	King Æthelwealh of Sussex helped St Wilfrid found a monastery and bishopric here in 681 but he returned to the north c. 686. The see was restored c. 709 but was translated to Chichester immediately after the Council of London in 1075. Centuries of coastal erosion seem to lie behind a tradition that the former cathedral's site is under the sea, but the most likely site is the 13th-century St Wilfrid's Chapel, Church Norton (shown). This is the chancel left behind when the rest of the parish church was dismantled (1864–66) and moved to Selsey village to become the basis of the new parish church. The chapel was dedicated to St Wilfrid in 1917.	50°45′18″N 0°45′55″W
Sherborne, Dorset		Abbey Church of St Mary the Virgin	705 – 1075	In 705 the see was created for western Wessex, from part of the diocese of Winchester. In 909 new dioceses were created for Devon and Cornwall (at Crediton, though possibly at Tawton first), Wiltshire (at Ramsbury), and Somerset (at Wells), leaving the Sherborne see with Dorset only. Ramsbury rejoined Sherborne in 1058, and the see was translated to Old Sarum in 1075. Sherborne became a priory in c. 993, an abbey in 1122 (dissolved 1539). Its church was bought by townspeople to be the parish church. Neighbouring Sherborne School incorporates some abbey buildings.	50°56′48″N 2°31′00″W
Soham, Cambridgeshire		St Andrew's Church, Soham; status uncertain	c. 630?; and c. 900 – c. 950	A monastery of c. 630 here, supposedly founded by St Felix, may have had an early cathedral for East Anglia (soon translated to Dommoc). It was destroyed by Danes c. 870, but when rebuilt c. 900 may then have served as a cathedral – when the sees of Dommoc and Elmham had both ceased to function – until eclipsed by Ely Cathedral. Ancient traces remain in St Andrew's parish church.	52.333478°N 0.336942°E
Syddensis, Lindsey, Lincolnshire		site uncertain; original dedication unknown	c. 680 – c. 875	The Mercian diocese founded by St Chad at Lichfield was divided in 678 and a cathedral built in Lindsey for the Bishop of Lindsey at the city of Syddensis. This is a placename otherwise unknown to us, but the search for the 'lost' see of Lindsey was long focused on Stow Minster in Stow-in-Lindsey That view has been largely discounted in favour of a site (still uncertain) in Lincoln itself. A persuasive case has been advanced for the see having been located in the Lincoln suburb of Wigford, with its Anglo-Saxon churches of St Mary-le-Wigford (upper image) or St Peter-at-Gowts (lower image) prime candidates for the site of the (probably wooden) earlier cathedral. The see of Lindsey suffered from Danish invasion and so was translated to Dorchester-on-Thames in the mid-9th century and never restored. St Mary's and St Peter's remain as parish churches.	53°13′36″N 0°32′28″W 53°13′18″N 0°32′38″W
Tawton, (later Bishop's Tawton), Devon		A Church of St Peter was recorded in 1256; later, Church of St John the Baptist; status doubtful	c. 905 – c.909	Some reported 16th/17th-century sources allege that the see for the first bishopric for Devon (created by dividing the Diocese of Sherborne in the early 10th century) was at Tawton (later Bishop's Tawton). The sources claim that Werstan held office from its creation in 905 to his death in 906; next, Putta was killed in 909 on his way to Crediton; then Eadwulf immediately moved the see to Crediton. Any link between a 10th-century bishop's church here and the extant parish church of St John the Baptist (shown) is conjectural, but there are remains of a modest "bishop's palace" at Court Farm, next to the church, used for centuries by diocesan bishops, and the parish was a bishop's peculiar. The co-ordinates given are for the 14th-century parish church, restored in the 19th century.	51°03′08″N 4°02′53″W
Wells, Somerset		Minster Church of St Andrew	909 – 1175	In c. 909 the Diocese of Sherborne, covering South-West England, was divided creating several new dioceses. Wells was chosen as the see for Somerset, and the town's minster, founded c. 705, became its cathedral. In 1090 a new bishop moved the see to Bath Abbey and built a new cathedral there. Despite Wells' loss of status, in 1176 a much larger building was begun, further north and on a different alignment, forming the basis of the present Wells Cathedral. (Wells became a cathedral city again in 1245.) A supposed font (shown), dated c. 700, is the only accessible material from the former cathedral. Excavations of the cloister garth 1978-80 located foundations of the former cathedral (see co-ordinates), which are almost undisturbed.	51°12′36″N 2°38′38″W
Welsh Bicknor, Herefordshire (was in Monmouthshire until 1844)		St Margaret's Church; site uncertain	6th century – 8th? century	Welsh Bicknor is in the area of Archenfield (once part of the British-Welsh petty kingdom of Ergyng before the area became part of England). The British bishop-saint Dubricius (otherwise Dyfrig) (c. 465 – c. 550) founded several monasteries in the area and has been called the first bishop of Ergyng. A charter in the Book of Llandaff located his see (in Latin, "episcopalis locus") at "Lann Custenhinn Garth Benni", identified with Constantine which location has been determined as Welsh Bicknor. With few local residents; its church, dedicated to St Margaret of Antioch, was closed by the Diocese of Hereford in 2010 and is now privately owned. Entirely new-built in 1858–59 to relieve overcrowding, it replaced a much older church on the same pre-Conquest "monastic or clas church" site.	51.8561°N 2.5935°W
The Old Minster, Winchester, Hampshire		The Old Minster, Winchester	c. 660 – 1093	The Old Minster was built c. 660 as the seat of the first bishop of Winchester, a new diocese following the ending of Dorchester on Thames as the see for Wessex. Known as The Old Minster from at least 901 (when The New Minster was built next to it, to the north), it was much enlarged in the 10th century, becoming a Benedictine cathedral priory in 964. It was demolished, together with the New Minster, in 1093, when the new Norman cathedral (the basis of the extant Winchester Cathedral) was sufficiently complete. The Norman cathedral was built just south of the Old Minster, on a different alignment, so parts of the Old Minster's foundations lie under the extant cathedral while the rest lie outside the cathedral, to the north, marked out with paviours (shown).	51.0611°N 1.3136°W

=== Former cathedrals founded (or proposed) between 1066 and 1539 ===
survivors becoming Church of England at the Reformation (1540)

Location	Image	Name	Dates	Notes	Coordinates
Bath, Somerset		Priory Church of St Peter & St Paul	1090 – 1539	After the destruction of a 7th-century abbey by Vikings, a 10th-century Benedictine abbey was destroyed in 1087 and rebuilt. The see for Somerset was translated from Wells to Bath in 1090, which became a cathedral priory. Bath was co-cathedral with Glastonbury 1195–1218, then co-cathedral with Wells from 1245 until Bath Priory was dissolved in 1539, just after it had been largely rebuilt. Queen Elizabeth I gave the priory church to be Bath's parish church in 1572, which led to years of restoration. More restoration by George Gilbert Scott followed in the 1860s.	51°22′53″N 2°21′32″W
Chester, Cheshire		Collegiate Church of St John the Baptist	1075 – 1102	A minster of the 7th century was refounded c. 1057 by Leofric as a college, dedicated to The Holy Rood and St John the Baptist. It became the cathedral for the Mercian diocese when the see was translated to Chester from Lichfield following a decree of the Council of London in 1075. The see was again translated by 1102 to Coventry, the diocesan title becoming 'Coventry and Lichfield'. St Johns retained a high status within the diocese, and the diocesan bishop was sometimes styled 'Bishop of Chester'. The Diocese of Chester was re-founded in 1541, using the former Abbey Church of St Werburgh for its cathedral.	53°11′20″N 2°53′09″W
Coventry (Warwickshire), West Midlands		Cathedral Priory of St Mary, St Peter and St Osburga	1102 – 1539	A Benedictine abbey was founded in 1043 on the site of a Saxon nunnery founded by St Osburga. The see of Lichfield, translated to Chester in 1075, moved again to Coventry by 1102 (the diocese of Coventry and Lichfield thus had two cathedrals until 1539 when this cathedral priory was dissolved). The priory church was sold for demolition in 1545 but some remains were located and preserved.	52.4089°N 1.5085°W
Glastonbury, Somerset		Abbey Church of St Mary, Glastonbury	1195 – 1218	At this ancient Christian site, dating from at least the early 7th century, a Benedictine abbey flourished from the year 940. In 1195 the Bishop of Bath was also made Abbot of Glastonbury, styling himself Bishop of Bath and Glastonbury. The monks opposed this move, in 1218 the pope agreed with them and the title reverted. The abbey was dissolved in 1539, the site sold, and the buildings robbed of building stone. In 1908-09 the site and ruins were acquired indirectly by the Church of England. The site is now in the hands of the charitable Glastonbury Abbey Trust.	51.145648°N 2.715318°W
Old Sarum, Wiltshire		Old Sarum Cathedral; dedication unknown	1075 – 1219	Among other buildings, the Normans built a cathedral (model shown, upper image) on this Iron Age hillfort site, moving the see here from Sherborne in 1075. The see was moved to Salisbury in 1219. Stone from Old Sarum was moved there for reuse in the new building, leaving foundations (shown, lower image).	51°05′39″N 1°48′23″W
Thetford, Norfolk		Minster of St Mary Major (St Mary the Great)	1071 – c. 1094	Herfast, the last Bishop of Elmham, moved his see to a minster here in 1071. With the help of his archdeadon, Herman, he spent the next 10 years trying to move the see to Bury St Edmunds Abbey against the wishes of Abbot Baldwin, and failed. In c. 1094 the see moved to Norwich. From 1103 the vacated building housed a Cluniac priory which moved away in 1107. In 1335 the abandoned site was given to the Dominicans for a friary (dissolved 1538). The site is thought to be near Thetford Grammar School (shown) (co-ordinates given): its buildings incorporate some remains of the friary.	52.413527°N 0.744477°E
Westbury-on-Trym, Gloucestershire		Holy Trinity Church, Westbury-on-Trym	proposed	A minster was founded in c. 795, and re-founded as a Benedictine priory by Bishop Oswald of Worcester in c. 962. The monks left to start Ramsey Abbey in c. 974. A monastery was re-founded by St Wulfstan, Bishop of Worcester, in c. 1093, but the church became collegiate in c. 1194. From 1286 Bishop Giffard intended Westbury as a second cathedral for the Worcester diocese, but he died in 1302. A similar plan by Bishop Carpenter in 1455 led to a change of dedication from "St Mary" to "Holy Trinity", but his chosen title of "Bishop of Worcester and Westbury" ceased on his death in 1476.	51.49395°N 2.616°W

=== Former Church of England cathedrals founded (or proposed) from 1540 to the present ===
Location	Image	Name	Dates	Notes	Coordinates
Aldfield, North Yorkshire		Abbey Church of St Mary, (Fountains Abbey)	proposed	Fountains Abbey, a Cistercian house of 1132, was dissolved in 1539. In 1540 King Henry VIII chose its church as the cathedral for a new diocese to cover Lancashire, some of Yorkshire, and much of Cumberland and Westmorland. The proposal was abandoned and the site sold, in favour of a new Diocese of Chester, covering the same area plus Cheshire. The site is now owned by National Trust and managed by English Heritage.	54°06′36″N 1°34′53″W
Bury St Edmunds, Suffolk		Abbey Church of St Mary & St Edmund	proposed	Founded in c. 633, the remains of St Edmund, martyred in 870, were brought here in 903. The collegiate church of c. 925 then became an abbey in 1020 (dissolved 1539). King Henry VIII proposed the abbey church as a cathedral in 1540, but the site was sold. The diocese was eventually created in 1914 from parts of the dioceses of Norwich and Ely, with St James's church, next to the abbey ruins, as its cathedral.	52.2441°N 0.7192°E
Colchester, Essex		Abbey Church of St John the Baptist, Colchester	proposed	A Benedictine monastery founded here in 1096 was dissolved in 1539. The abbey church was unsuccessfully proposed as a cathedral for Essex (probably as a substitute for Waltham Abbey) in c. 1540. Only the abbey's gatehouse remains.	51.885544°N 0.901297°E
Coventry (Warwickshire), West Midlands		(1st) Cathedral of St Michael, Coventry	1918 – 1962	This very large medieval parish church, dating from c. 1300 (collegiate from 1908) became a cathedral in 1918 when the modern Diocese of Coventry was created from part of the Diocese of Worcester. Almost totally destroyed by aerial bombing in 1940, it retained its status until a new Coventry Cathedral opened in 1962.	52°24′29″N 1°30′27″W
Dunstable, Bedfordshire		Priory Church of St Peter, Dunstable	proposed	An Augustinian house founded by 1125. Dissolved in 1540, the priory church was proposed by King Henry VIII as a cathedral for Bedfordshire. Instead, the nave became a parish church.	51.886°N 0.5176°W
Guildford, Surrey		Holy Trinity Church, Guildford	1927 – 1961	A replacement parish church, completed 1763, which was the pro-cathedral for the new Diocese of Guildford from its creation in 1927 until the consecration of the new cathedral in 1961.	51°14′09″N 0°34′15″W
Guisborough, North Yorkshire		Gisborough Priory	proposed	This Augustinian Priory of St Mary, founded in 1119, was dissolved in 1540. Its church was one of those proposed by King Henry VIII as a new cathedral, but was largely destroyed. The spelling of the priory's name (Gisborough) differs slightly from that of the local town.	54.535833°N 1.048889°W
Launceston, Cornwall		Priory Church of St Stephen	proposed	An Augustinian priory, founded in 1127 was dissolved in 1539. The priory church was proposed in 1540 as one possible cathedral for Cornwall, but the site was sold.	50.636472°N 4.355417°W
Leicester, Leicestershire		Abbey Church of St Mary de Pratis (St Mary of the Meadows)	proposed	An Augustinian house of 1143, the abbey was dissolved in 1538. The abbey church was listed among King Henry VIII's 1540 proposals as a cathedral for Leicestershire, but the site had already been disposed of.	52.648683°N 1.136856°W
Liverpool (Lancashire), Merseyside		St Peter's Church, Liverpool	1880–1919	St Peter's church was built 1704, a second parish church for Liverpool. In 1880 the Diocese of Liverpool was created from part of the Diocese of Chester, with St Peter's as its pro-cathedral. Building of a cathedral began in 1904, opening 1919 when St Peter's was closed (demolished 1922). A roadway marker (shown) in Church Street marks its site.	53°24′18″N 2°59′03″W
Nottingham, Nottinghamshire		Church of St Mary the Virgin, Nottingham; status uncertain	proposed?	Nottingham's original parish church, likely a 7th-century foundation listed in the Domesday Book, St Mary's building now dates from the 14th century. In the late 19th century the creation of a diocese for Nottinghamshire was considered, and St Mary's future elevation was seemingly assumed by some. Bodley installed a canopied chair (shown) to be a bishop's cathedra. The church's guidebook gives 1890 as the date of its installation and of Bodley's internal Chapter House, despite Southwell Minster's elevation to cathedral status in 1884.	52.951111°N 1.143°W
Osney, Oxfordshire		Abbey Church of St Mary, Osney	1542 – 1545	An Augustinian priory founded in 1129, was raised to abbey status c. 1154, but dissolved in 1539. Under 1540 proposals by King Henry VIII, the abbey church became the cathedral for Oxfordshire in 1542, but in 1545 the see was translated to Christ Church Cathedral, Oxford. Almost all traces at Osney have vanished.	51°44′57″N 1°16′17″W
Shrewsbury, Shropshire		Abbey Church of St Peter & St Paul, Shrewsbury	proposed	A Benedictine abbey was founded in 1083 (on the site of an Anglo-Saxon church of St Peter), but dissolved in 1539. In 1540 its church was proposed as a cathedral for Shropshire by King Henry VIII, but the nave alone survived as a parish church. The clerestory, lost after the dissolution, was restored in the 19th century and in 1886-94 Pearson rebuilt the whole east end (choir and sanctuary) that had also been lost. A 1922 proposal for cathedral status (in a new diocese) was defeated in parliament.	52°42′27″N 2°44′38″W
Southend-on-Sea, Essex		St Erkenwald's Church; status uncertain	proposed?	This was a very large church built 1905–1910 to the design of Sir Walter Tapper, when Southend's population was growing rapidly. It seems that, due to its impressive size, "many influential people advocated the town as the diocesan centre for the new bishopric of Essex", although Chelmsford had been chosen as the see for Essex in 1914. Declining post-war congregations in the 1950s and 1960s led to neglect and disrepair. The church was declared redundant in 1978, caught fire in 1992 and was demolished in 1995.	51°32′12″N 0°43′27″E
Waltham Abbey, Essex		Abbey Church of Waltham Holy Cross & St Lawrence	proposed	A Norman building of c. 1100, on the 7th-centuru site of earlier churches. The secular canons from its collegiate predecessor became Augustinian canons when a priory was founded in 1177 (abbey from 1184, dissolved in 1540). It is the reputed burial-place of King Harold II, killed at the Battle of Hastings in 1066. Proposed as a cathedral by King Henry VIII, only the (truncated) nave was saved as a parish church. Much restoration took place in the 1860s and 1870s.	51.6875°N 0.0035°W
Welbeck, Nottinghamshire		Abbey Church of St James the Great, Welbeck	proposed	A Premonstratensian abbey, founded 1140, was dissolved in 1538. Its church was proposed by King Henry VIII in 1540 as a possible cathedral for Nottinghamshire, but the site was sold. The mansion later built on the site (shown) has traces of the former abbey.	refer53.262222°N 1.156111°W
Westminster, London		The Collegiate Church of St Peter at Westminster	1540 – 1550 (Diocese of Westminster); 1550 – 1556 (Diocese of London)	A Benedictine Abbey of St Peter was founded here in c. 959, and rebuilt by St Edward the Confessor in the mid-11th century. it was dissolved in 1540 but its church became one of King Henry VIII's new cathedrals, for a new Diocese of Westminster. Cathedral status was lost when its diocese was reunited with London's in 1550, was briefly restored in 1552 (dated from 1550) when the church became a second cathedral for London (in addition to St Paul's), but was finally lost in 1556 under Queen Mary I, when it again became a monastery (dissolved 1559). The church, collegiate since 1560, is still universally known as Westminster Abbey. It is a Royal Peculiar.	51°29′58″N 0°07′39″W

=== Former Post-Reformation Roman Catholic cathedrals ===
Location	Image	Name	Dates	Notes	Coordinates
City of London, London		St Mary's Church, Moorfields	1852–1869	Built in 1820 to replace the church destroyed by the Gordon Riots, in 1850 it became the first pro-cathedral of the Diocese of Westminster. That function was translated in 1869 to the church of Our Lady of Victories, Kensington. Demolished in 1899, the present St Mary's Church was opened in 1902.	51°31′7.64″N 0°5′8.57″W
Clifton, Bristol		Pro-Cathedral of the Holy Apostles	1850–1973	Building started 1834, but unstable ground delayed completion (of a smaller church) until 1847. It became the pro-cathedral in 1850, and was closed in 1973 when it was replaced by the new Clifton Cathedral. Following a series of secular uses, the building was developed for housing and offices c. 2014.	51.456297°N 2.609720°W
Hereford, Herefordshire		Abbey Church of St Michael and All Angels	1854–1920	The Diocese of Newport and Menevia was created in 1850 but with no official seat. In 1854 building began here when it was agreed that this would be the pro-cathedral. In 1859 it became a Benedictine priory, consecrated 1860. The see was translated to St David's Metropolitan Cathedral, Cardiff in 1920, and the priory became Belmont Abbey the same year.	52.03932°N 2.756412°W
Kensington, London		Our Lady of Victories Church	1869–1903	The original church on this site and with this dedication was opened in 1869 and for 34 years it served as the pro-cathedral for the Diocese of Westminster until Westminster Cathedral in London was opened in 1903. Destroyed by bombing in 1940, its replacement (shown) opened in 1959.	51°29′57″N 0°11′52″W
Liverpool (Lancashire), Merseyside		Pro-Cathedral of St. Nicholas	1850–1967	Built in 1813, the church served as pro-cathedral for the newly-created (then) Diocese of Liverpool from 1850 until the consecration of Liverpool Metropolitan Cathedral in 1967. It was then a parish church until its demolition in 1973 to make way for Royal Mail's Copperas Hill Sorting Office, where a plaque records the site's former use.	53°24′25″N 2°58′30″W
Middlesbrough, North Yorkshire		Cathedral Church of Our Lady Of Perpetual Succour (but known as St Mary's)	1878–1983	Opened in the St Hilda's district of Middlesbrough in August 1878, it became the cathedral for the Diocese of Middlesbrough when it was created in December 1878. Structural concerns and population movement led to the see being translated to the new St Mary's Cathedral in Coulby Newham, to the south of the town, in 1983. The former cathedral, left unused, was severely damaged in an arson attack in 2000 which led to its demolition.	54°34′48″N 1°14′13″W
Plymouth, Devon		Our Lady and St John the Evangelist Church	1850–1858	Known as St. Mary's Church, it opened on 20 December 1807 and was pro-cathedral for the newly-created Diocese of Plymouth from 1850 to 1858, when Plymouth Cathedral was opened. The church was then remodelled and given to the Little Sisters of the Poor. In 1884, they left and it was converted into housing. It was demolished in 1960.	50.3703°N 4.1593°W
Southampton, Hampshire		St Joseph's Church	1882	Completed in 1845, with a chancel designed by Pugin, this church served as the pro-cathedral of the newly-created Roman Catholic Diocese of Portsmouth from May to August 1882, until the Cathedral of St John the Evangelist, Portsmouth was completed It remains a parish church.	50.899072°N 1.405937°W
Southwark, London		Archbishop Amigo Jubilee Hall	1941–1958	The hall served as pro-cathedral for the (then) Diocese of Southwark during the rebuilding of the adjacent cathedral following its near-destruction from bombing on 16th April 1941, during World War II. The rebuilt cathedral reopened in 1958.	51.456297°N 2.609720°W
York, North Yorkshire		St. George's Church	1850–1864	Completed in 1850, this church served as pro-cathedral for the Beverley diocese until the construction of St. Wilfrid's in York. It remains a parish church.	53.9550°N 1.0758°W
York, North Yorkshire		St Wilfrid's Church	1864–1878	Completed in 1864, this church succeeded St George's as pro-cathedral for the Beverley diocese until in 1878 the diocese was split into the dioceses of Leeds and Middlesbrough. It remains a parish church.	53.961900°N 1.084700°W

== Scotland ==
For various reasons, formal dioceses were formed later in Scotland than in the rest of Great Britain. Bishops certainly existed in areas from the earliest Christian times (often from Irish monastic missionary activity), but the territory over which an early (often monastic) bishop operated was ill-defined. Hence the term "bishop's church" is sometimes used for a seat used by an early bishop rather than the word "cathedral" which some expect to be attached to a formal diocese. Traditionally, the medieval Scottish diocesan system was held to have been largely created by the Norman-influenced King David I (reigned 1124–1153), though this is an oversimplification.

Nevertheless, in this List, the large number of pre-Reformation cathedrals in Scotland has been split into two sections in an attempt to make the information more manageable. The first section comprises cathedrals founded before 1100; the second, those cathedrals founded (or proposed) between 1100 and 1560. The choice of the year 1100, though arbitrary, approximates to the beginning of the reign of King David I (1124) (see above) and is also close to the date of the Norman Conquest (1066) which has been used to separate the two sections of pre-Reformation cathedrals in the portion of this List covering England.

In order to assist users of this List to trace the development of the dioceses, the text of most entries is preceded by the name (in parentheses) of the late medieval Scottish diocese into which each early cathedral merged, usually by a process of translation of the see to a new location.

As the Scottish Reformation of 1560 developed, bishops and cathedrals became progressively marginalised and neglected. By Act of the Scottish Parliament in 1690 (confirming the Church's own final decision of 1689), the Church of Scotland finally became wholly Presbyterian, with no dioceses, no bishops, so no functioning cathedrals. At that date, all cathedrals of the Church of Scotland became former cathedrals. However, some still use the title, but for honorific purposes only.

The Scottish Episcopal Church (part of the Anglican Communion) and the Roman Catholic Church in Scotland maintain their own diocesan structures with their own cathedrals and bishops.

=== Former cathedrals founded before 1100 ===
survivors becoming Church of Scotland at the Scottish Reformation (1560)

Location	Image	Name	Dates	Notes	Coordinates
Abercorn, West Lothian		Abercorn Kirk; original dedication unknown	681–685	In c. 675, here at the (then) northern edge of Northumbria, St Wilfrid founded a monastery. In 681 St Trumwine became "Bishop of those Picts subject to English rule", but when the Northumbrians lost the Battle of Nechtansmere in 685 he left. The church, likely on the monastic site, dates from the 12th century but was much altered in 1579 and 1893.	55.99334°N 3.47326°W
Abernethy (Perthshire), Perth and Kinross		status uncertain; site uncertain; dedication uncertain	early 8th century – 11th century?	(Diocese of Dunblane) The historical basis for a supposed bishopric here is obscure. No bishops' names are known for certain: Fergus may have been one (of 3) in the early 8th century. Any bishopric had moved to Muthill by the 12th century. A supposed 6th-century church of St Brigid may have been a bishop's church.	56.333143°N 3.311670°W
Birsay, Orkney		St Magnus' Kirk; status uncertain	?mid-11th century – 1137?	(Diocese of Orkney) Some claim that the original church here (Christ's Church or Christchurch) was built by Earl Thorfinn in c. 1060, and used by early bishops. The present kirk of 1664 (since enlarged) is on the original site.	59.129444°N 3.316389°W
Dunkeld (Perthshire), Perth and Kinross		Cathedral of St Columba	9th century c. 1120 – 1689	(Diocese of Dunkeld) By the 9th century the supposed early 7th-century site had a stone-built Culdee monastery with relics of St Columba. The abbot was described c. 869 as chief bishop of the kingdom, but soon after St Andrews became the primary bishopric. The cathedral was re-founded in the 12th century, but most fabric dates from the 15th. In the Reformation the nave was unroofed, but the 13th-century choir has since been a parish kirk. The ruins are in the care of Historic Environment Scotland.	56°33′54″N 3°35′23″W
Halkirk (Caithness), Highland		Halkirk Auld Kirk; original dedication uncertain	early 8th century?; mid-12th century – early 13th century	(Diocese of Caithness) Tradition says St Ferus founded a church here in the early 8th century, before Caithness fell under Norse control. In c. 1145 King David I founded a bisopric here despite Norse opposition. The second bishop was mutilated in 1202, the third killed in 1222. King Alexander II sent a raiding party to avenge the bishop's murder, and initiated the 1224 translation of the see to Dornoch. Halkirk's cathedral became a parish church, rebuilt (on the same site) in 1753. Declared redundant in 1934, no pre-1753 remains are known.	58.5169°N 3.4863°W
Hoddom (Dumfriesshire), Dumfries and Galloway		dedication unknown; status uncertain	late 6th century	A cathedral was said to have been founded here in the late 6th century by St Mungo. Any cathedral seems not to have survived his death in 612, but a monastery had developed by the 8th century. A parish church was built on the site in the 12th century, replaced after the Reformation by one of 1609 nearer to Ecclefechan at Hoddom Cross (burnt down 1975). The co-ordinates are for the former monastic site.	55.041563°N 3.305430°W
Iona (Argyll), Argyll and Bute		St Mary's Cathedral	6th century – 10th century (discontinuous); c. 1510 – 1638; 1662 – 1689	(Diocese of the Isles) St Columba founded a monastery here c. 565. Like Columba, some abbots were also titled 'bishop' but the abbey church did not achieve settled cathedral status until c.1510 when the see of the diocese was translated from Snizort Cathedral at Skeabost on Skye. Attempts had been made in 1433 and 1498 to move the see to Iona, and the diocese was governed in practice for some of that time from Iona. After bishoprics were abolished in 1689 the building fell into decay until rescued in 1899 by the creation of the Iona Cathedral Trust and rebuilt by the Iona Community from 1938. In 2021 Historic Environment Scotland took over the care of parts of the abbey site.	56.326127°N 6.400438°W
Kingarth, Isle of Bute (County of Bute), Argyll and Bute		St Blane's Church, Kingarth	6th century	A monastic bishopric was reputedly founded here by Saint Cathan who was succeeded as bishop by Saint Blane. It was a cathedral until St Blane's death c. 590. Destroyed by Vikings c. 790, a new church was built on the site in the 12th century, but abandoned after 1560. Its ruins are in the care of Historic Environment Scotland.	55.75°N 5.03°W
Lismore (Argyll), Argyll and Bute		Lismore Kirk; cathedral probably dedicated to St Moluag	6th century; and c. 1200 – c. 1560	(Diocese of Argyll) The island of Lismore was by tradition chosen by St Moluag in the 6th century for a monastery. It again became the seat of a bishop in the 12th century when the Diocese of Argyll was created from the western portion of the Diocese of Dunkeld. The 14th-century cathedral was small and simple, and the new diocese poor, leading to proposals to translate the see to Saddell (which failed). The building was abandoned after the Reformation; it was roofless by 1679, the tower and nave later razed (outlines can be seen). The choir was restored for use as the parish kirk.	56°32′4″N 5°28′50″W
Mortlach, (now Dufftown), (Banffshire), Moray		Mortlach Parish Church	1011 to 1132	Supposedly the site of a monastery founded by St Moluag in a mission to the Picts in c. 564, the Chronicle of John of Fordun records that in c. 1011 a bishopric was established here, aided by King Malcolm II. The standard account claims the see was translated to Aberdeen in 1132, but Woolf suggests the Mortlach bishopric was part of an earlier episcopal framework, with the creation of an Aberdeen diocese in a new diocesan system. It is claimed the parish church stands on the monastic site and contains some ancient fabric.	57.44078°N 3.12613°W
Rosemarkie, (Ross), Highland		Cathedral of St Peter	early 8th century; and 1124 – mid-13th century	(Diocese of Ross) A monastic cathedral was probably founded by St Curetán as abbot and first bishop in c. 700, and St Moluag was probably buried here. The Diocese of Ross was re-established by King David I in 1124. Remains of Curetán's church have been found and placed in the current parish kirk, built in 1821 on the same site. In the mid-13th century, Fortrose Cathedral was built nearby, and the see translated there.	57.59162°N 4.11516°W
St Andrews, Fife		Church of St Regulus (or St Rule)	c. 1070 – early 14th century	(Archdiocese of St Andrews (from 1472); formerly Diocese of St Andrews) The church is named for a legendary 4th-century Greek monk who allegedly brought St Andrew's relics here, but they probably came from Bishop Acca in the 730s, arriving at Kilrymont (later called St Andrews. A Culdee monastery, later known as the Church of St Mary on the Rock, may have housed them until they were enshrined in a cathedral. The Church of St Regulus, the first cathedral known here, was built c. 1070–1100. The Bishops of St Andrews, chief centre of the Scottish church by the mid-9th century, are, however, recorded from c. 1028. It was built of squared ashlar blocks as a tower and chancel, with a nave added to the west and a probable presbytery to the east c. 1144 when it became an Augustinian cathedral priory. Its tower and unroofed chancel stand in the precincts of the later cathedral, all in the care of Historic Environment Scotland.	56.33965°N 2.786383°W
Whithorn (Wigtownshire), Dumfries and Galloway		The Candida Casa, dedicated to St Martin of Tours	late 4th century – early 9th century	Tradition tells that in c. 397 Saint Ninian, a local Briton abbot and bishop, founded a monastery here with a (probably whitened-stone) church named Candida Casa ("White House"). The monastery came under Northumbrian control in 731, but Its list of bishops ended early in the 9th century when that control/protection ceased. Excavations in 1984–1996 located Candida Casa just southeast of the 1177 Priory site, and markers show the outline of the cathedral as it was in c. 730. The Priory site is in the care of Historic Environment Scotland.	54.733189°N 4.417525°W

=== Former cathedrals founded (or proposed) between 1100 and 1560 ===
survivors becoming Church of Scotland at the Scottish Reformation (1560)

Location	Image	Name	Dates	Notes	Coordinates
Aberdeen, Aberdeenshire		Cathedral of St Machar	1131–1689	(Diocese of Aberdeen) Legend tells of a church founded c. 580 by St Machar in Old Aberdeen. In the 12th century a Norman cathedral was built and Bishop Nechtan moved in 1132 from his see at Mortlach (now Dufftown) to become its first bishop. The central tower fell in 1688, destroying the transepts, the ruins of which are in the care of Historic Environment Scotland. Since 1689 the nave with its twin spired towers has been the High Kirk of Aberdeen.	57.169700°N 2.102069°W
Birnie, Elgin, Moray		Birnie Kirk Claimed earlier dedication to St Brendan said to be doubtful	c. 1140–1184	(Diocese of Moray) This church, built c. 1140 on a 6th-century church site, was the seat of the first bishops. The see moved to Kinneddar in 1184, leaving it for parish use. Closed by the Church of Scotland in November 2023, it has been used since January 2024 by the Roman Catholic Ordinariate.	57°36′41″N 3°19′48″W
Brechin, Angus		Cathedral of the Holy Trinity, Brechin	c.1150-1689	(Diocese of Brechin) Originally a Culdee monastery, possibly from Abernethy. Here too is a fine round tower, dating from c. 1000. The first bishop, Samson, was appointed by King David I in c. 1150. The extant building, dating from the 13th century, was used from 1689 until November 2021 as Brechin High Kirk.	56.730694°N 2.662125°W
Dornoch (Sutherland), Highland		Cathedral of St Mary	1239 – 1689	(Diocese of Caithness) Founded in 1224 by (Saint) Gilbert de Moravia ("of Moray"), the fourth bishop, the see was translated here from Halkirk in 1239 when the remains of Adam, the third bishop, were moved here from Skinnet church, where they had been buried after his murder at Hallkirk in 1222.	57.880729°N 4.030695°W
Egilsay, Orkney		St. Magnus' Church; status uncertain	probably sometime after 1135	It seems unlikely that this island church was ever a cathedral for the Bishop of Orkney, but "it may have been regarded as a bishop's church". The mid-12th-century church commemorates the killing of St Magnus by his brother c. 1118, and is usually dated decades later than 1135 when Magnus was sainted. He spent the night before his murder in a church on Egilsay, its site probably used for this church. His body was buried on Egilsay, reburied at Birsay, and finally moved to Kirkwall. Unused since the early 19th century, the church (now unroofed, with its round tower reduced) is in the care of Historic Environment Scotland.	59.1569°N 2.9353°W
Elgin, Moray		Cathedral of the Holy Trinity	1224 – c. 1560	(Diocese of Moray) Building began in 1224 when Bishop Andrew got papal permission to move the see from Spynie to Elgin. It was rebuilt, enlarged, and a Chapter House added after a 1270 fire. More rebuilding followed a fire in 1390 (after an attack by Alexander Stewart, Earl of Buchan) and still more in the 15th century. At the Reformation the cathedral was abandoned for the 12th-century parish kirk of St Giles. Ruins are in the care of Historic Environment Scotland.	57°39′02″N 03°18′20″W
Fortrose, (Ross), Highland		Cathedral of Saint Peter and Saint Boniface	early 13th century – mid-17th century	(Diocese of Ross) The see was moved here in the early 13th century from Rosemarkie to a new sandstone building with an external NW tower and NE sacristy-cum-chapter house. A SW aisle and chapel were added in the 14th century. Ruins of the last two parts remain. Religious usage may have continued for a time after the Reformation, but by c. 1650 it had become the burgh's town hall and prison. The ruins are in the care of Historic Environment Scotland.	57.580885°N 4.130495°W
Glasgow		St. Mungo's Cathedral, Glasgow	c. 1114 – 1689	(Archdiocese of Glasgow (from 1492); formerly Diocese of Glasgow) Tradition has a church settlement founded by St Mungo in the 6th century, from which Glasgow grew. The first diocesan was Bishop John, c. 1114, as claimed earlier bishops were not Glasgow-based. The building is mostly 13th-century, the central tower and spire 15th-century, and the Blackadder Aisle c.1500. Its good, complete condition is attributed at least in part to its never having been unroofed (unlike most cathedrals in the Scottish Reformation). The building, accommodating the High Kirk of Glasgow, is Crown property, maintained by Historic Environment Scotland.	55.862966°N 4.234436°W
Kinneddar, Moray		Kirk of Kinneddar; dedication unknown	c. 1187 – c. 1208	(Diocese of Moray) Shortly after 1184 the seat of the Bishop of Moray was moved here from Birnie. The adjacent castle was a residence of the bishop from 1187 until the late 14th century, but little of it remains. The see was moved again c. 1208 to Spynie by Bishop Bricus (1203–1222). In c. 1669 the building was abandoned for a new kirk at Drainie when parishes merged. Surveys confirm that a mound in the old churchyard here (shown) covers the former cathedral's foundations.	57.709451°N 3.305645°W
Kirkwall, Orkney		Cathedral of St Magnus	1137 – 1689	(Diocese of Orkney) In 1135 the bones of the newly sainted Magnus (murdered on Egilsay c. 1118) were moved from the cathedral at Birsay to the church of St Olaf near Kirkwall. Building of a cathedral here in 1137, dedicated to St Magnus, was instigated by St Ronald of Orkney and Bishop William. Consecration of the cathedral, with the translation of St Magnus' relics, probably took place before 1151. Further building was done during the next four centuries. Restorations in the 19th and 20th led to the discovery of supposed relics of St Ronald and St Magnus were found in pillars in the choir, the oldest part of the cathedral. The building houses a congregation of the Church of Scotland, but under a 1486 Charter it is owned by the Burgh of Kirkwall.	58°58′56″N 2°57′32″W
Madderty (Perthshire), Perth and Kinross		Inchaffray Abbey Church of the Virgin Mary and St John the Evangelist	proposed	In c. 1200 Earl Gilbert founded an Augustinian priory on a site which already had a Culdee church (of St John); which became an abbey c. 1220. By c. 1230 Dunblane Cathedral was roofless and had few staff so in 1237 it was proposed that the see of Dunblane be transferred here. However, Bishop Clement of Dunblane resolved the situation there and the proposal was abandoned. A few abbey ruins remain on farmland (shown).	56.3836°N 3.6954°W
Muthill (Perthshire), Perth and Kinross		dedication unknown	mid - late 12th century	(Diocese of Dunblane) Culdees were here in the 12th century when Muthill superseded Abernethy as an ecclesiastical centre. Bishops based here often took the title "Bishop of Strathearn". They had moved to Dunblane by the 13th century, leaving their former cathedral here, with its distinctive tower, as a parish church. Enlarged in the 15th century, it was later abandoned for a new kirk built 1826–28. It is now in the care of Historic Environment Scotland.	56.326164°N 3.832428°W
Saddell, Kintyre (Argyll), Argyll and Bute		Saddell Abbey (conventual church dedicated to the Virgin Mary)	proposed	A Cistercian monastery founded in 1160, probably completed c. 1210. In 1249 it was proposed that the seat of the Bishop of Argyll should move here from Lismore Cathedral because of the latter's then ruinous state but no transfer took place. By the late 15th century the abbey had declined and was abandoned. In 1507 King James IV transferred the abbey's lands to the Bishop of Argyll who built a residence here. In 1512 the king attempted to have the see of Argyll moved to Saddell, but his death in 1513 ended that scheme. The site was used for burials among the few Abbey ruins that remain.	55.531944°N 5.511389°W
St Andrews, Fife		Cathedral Priory of St Andrews	1318 – 1689 (in ruins from 1561)	(Archdiocese of St Andrews (from 1472); formerly Diocese of St Andrews) Founded c. 1160 by Bishop Ærnald (or Arnold), as the larger successor to the Augustinian priory formerly based at the Church of St Regulus (the first cathedral). The building, delayed by a mishap in c. 1270, was finally consecrated in 1318. A fire in 1378 caused serious damage, which was not fully repaired until 1440. Nonetheless, the cathedral was the largest, and the bishop/archbishop the most powerful, in Scotland. However, in 1559, during the Reformation, a mob destroyed the interior, and by 1561 it had become an abandoned ruin being robbed of its stonework. The cathedral priory site and building remains, including those of the church of St Regulus, are in the care of Historic Environment Scotland.	56.3400°N 2.7875°W
Skeabost (Skye), (Inverness-shire), Highland		Snizort Cathedral; dedicated to St Columba	1387 – c. 1510	(Diocese of the Isles) The original territory of this diocese was 'Sodor' comprising the Hebrides and the Isle of Man, which had been settled by Vikings from c.850, and were under Norwegian suzerainty with a local ruler. By a 1266 treaty Scotland took Sodor from Norway. The cathedral for the diocese was at Peel until 1387 when England began to take control of the Isle of Man. The diocese split, and all but the Isle of Man became the Scottish Diocese of the Isles, with an existing, possibly collegiate, church on St Columba's Isle in the River Snizort, on Skye chosen as the seat for its bishop. Attempts in 1433 and 1498 to move the see officially to the preferred location of Iona, only succeeded c. 1510. The former cathedral's site lies to the east on St Columba's Isle, with later ruins and burials nearby.	57.4532°N 6.3057°W
Spynie, Elgin, Moray		Holy Trinity Cathedral	c. 1208 – 1224	(Diocese of Moray) The see of the Bishop of Moray was translated from Kinneddar to a late 12th-century church here in c. 1208. Bishops Richard (1187–1203) and Bricius (1203–1222) are buried here. Bishop Andrew (1223–1242), with the consent of Pope Honorius III, moved the see to Elgin in 1224. The former cathedral remained a parish church until c. 1735 (when a new kirk was built in the parish, at New Spynie / Quarrywood). By 1962 only a slight mound in its graveyard marked the site of the former cathedral. It lies c. 500 m across a field SSW from the ruined Spynie Palace, once a residence of the bishops of Moray.	57.672551°N 3.294929°W
Thurso (Caithness), Highland		Old St Peter's Kirk; status uncertain	possibly 12th century – possibly 16th century	This ruinous former parish kirk may have originated as a mainland outpost for the Norse bishopric of Orkney as evidence points to an early 12th century origin. With the founding of a separate Diocese of Caithness in c. 1150, "it may have acted as a proto-cathedral for the diocese". Records show further episcopal use of St Peter's as "throughout much of the 17th century the Diocesan Synod met alternately at Dornoch and Thurso", Dornoch Cathedral having been rendered ruinous in 1570. When episcopacy ended in 1689, St Peter's became the parish kirk, but was abandoned as unsafe in 1832 in favour of a new kirk nearer the town centre. The site is owned by Highland Council. Access is not normally possible.	58.596575°N 3.515042°W
Whithorn (Wigtownshire), Dumfries and Galloway		Cathedral of St Martin of Tours and St Ninian	1128 – 1689	(Diocese of Galloway) The see of Whithorn was re-founded in 1128 as an Augustinian cathedral priory, becoming Premonstratensian in 1177. The bishopric lay within the English (pre-Reformation) Province of York until 1472; afterwards in the Archdiocese of St Andrews until 1492, then in the Archdiocese of Glasgow. After 1560 parts of the cathedral fell into disrepair. From 1690 the nave (only) became the parish kirk. In the early 18th century the main tower collapsed. In 1822 a new parish kirk was built nearby and much of the old monastic site was cleared for burials. The roofless nave of the former cathedral and the crypt are in the care of Historic Environment Scotland.	54.733500°N 4.417389°W

=== Former Post-Reformation cathedrals ===
During and after the Scottish Reformation (1560) cathedrals were increasingly neglected and abandoned, but episcopacy continued to be supported by Stuart Kings. By Act of the Scottish Parliament in 1690 (confirming the Church's own final decision of 1689) the Church of Scotland became wholly Presbyterian, with no dioceses, no bishops, so no cathedrals as such. At that date, all Church of Scotland cathedrals became former cathedrals. Some still use the title, but for honorific purposes only.

The Scottish Episcopal Church and the Roman Catholic Church in Scotland maintain their own diocesan structures with their own cathedrals and bishops, as do the Orthodox churches.

Church of Scotland

Location	Image	Name	Dates	Notes	Coordinates
Edinburgh, Midlothian		St. Giles' Cathedral, Edinburgh	1633–1638 and 1661–1689	(Diocese of Edinburgh, created 1633 from part of the Archdiocese of St Andrews) Dating from the 12th century (collegiate from 1468), St Giles' Church was raised to cathedral status in 1633 by King Charles I for his Scottish coronation, and as the seat of the Bishop of Edinburgh. When episcopacy ceased in 1689 it became the High Kirk of Edinburgh.	55.949524°N 3.190928°W

Scottish Episcopal Church

Location	Image	Name	Dates	Notes	Co-ordinates
Edinburgh, Midlothian		St Paul's Pro-Cathedral	early 19th century – 1879	Built 1816–1818, the church soon after became the Pro-Cathedral for the Episcopal Diocese of Edinburgh until 1879 when the new St Mary's Cathedral was sufficiently complete. Dedicated to St Paul and St George since 1932, when the nearby church of St George was closed.	55.956797°N 3.188558°W

=== Former Post-Reformation Roman Catholic cathedrals ===
Location	Image	Name	Dates	Notes	Coordinates
Ayr, South Ayrshire		Good Shepherd Cathedral	1961–2007	After the original cathedral in Dumfries burnt down this 1957 parish church became the cathedral of the Diocese of Galloway. Falling attendances led to closure in 2007 and translation of the see to St Margaret's, Ayr. By 2012 the former 1961 cathedral had been converted into housing.	55.469842°N 4.599087°W
Dumfries (Dumfriesshire), Dumfries and Galloway		St Andrew's Cathedral	1878–1961	Built 1815, the church became a cathedral in 1878 for the Diocese of Galloway with the restoration of the Scottish hierarchy. It burnt down in 1961, the see was translated to Ayr and a new church was built over the crypt of the former 1878 cathedral, the tower and spire of which survive.	55.068352°N 3.606584°W

== Wales ==
The end of Roman rule in Britain in the early 5th century left a Romano-British (later sometimes called "Celtic") church which became increasingly confined to the western parts of the island (principally modern Wales) as Angles, Saxons, and other invaders attacked and settled from the east. This church grew in size and influence in the west during the 6th and 7th centuries (a period sometimes characterised in Wales as the "Age of the Saints") with the conversion of ruling families (and consequently their peoples). Among the clergy, the title of "bishop" was more frequently used than later when large dioceses developed. The surviving evidence for most of these early bishoprics is now fragmentary and secondary at best, if not legendary. This list contains some better-evidenced examples.

The dioceses of the Welsh church, certainly from Norman times, were, sometimes reluctantly, part of the English church in the Province of Canterbury. This situation continued after the establishment of the Church of England at the Reformation until 1920, when the Church of England was disestablished in Wales, becoming the Church in Wales, a separate self-governing member of the Anglican Communion.

=== Former cathedrals (or proposed cathedrals) ===
Location	Image	Name	Dates	Notes	Coordinates
Carmarthen, Carmarthenshire		St Peter's Church, Carmarthen	proposed	In 1536 William Barlow, newly- appointed Bishop of St Davids, proposed to move the see to Carmarthen (then the most important town in Wales) which had only one parish church, St Peter's. The Cathedral Chapter opposed the bishop, and by 1539 had finally defeated his proposal. A similar proposal in c. 1678 by Bishop Thomas also failed. A Norman foundation, the building dates from the 14th century, with much mid-19th century restoration.	51.858001°N 4.302713°W
Denbigh, Denbighshire		Leicester's Church, Denbigh	proposed	Known as Leicester's Church, this post-Reformation project was begun in 1578 by the Earl of Leicester. Planned as a large preaching hall to be dedicated to St David and to replace St Asaph Cathedral, but work ceased in 1584.	53.1823°N 3.4193°W
Glasbury (Radnorshire), Powys		site probable; original dedication unknown	6th century – 11th century	Glasbury is the location of the 6th-century Clas Cynidr, supposedly founded by Saint Cynidr (otherwise Kenider). A list of its bishops survives, but little remains to show the original site of the clas or its church, which lay south of the modern village on the other side of the River Wye (which changed course in the 17th century and left the church site isolated from the village by a new stretch of water). New churches were built in the village (in c. 1665, later demolished, and in 1838). The coordinates relate to visible earthworks in a field where the clas may have stood.	52.04297°N 3.20246°W
Holyhead, Anglesey		St Cybi's Church	540 – 554 or later	Saint-bishop Cybi settled here c. 540, founded an important clas, and remained its head until he died in 554. The site (and later town) became known as 'Cybi's fort' (Caergybi in Welsh). The 13th-century chancel is the oldest part of the parish church, which stands on or near the ancient site.	53.3114°N 4.6326°W
Llanbadarn Fawr, Ceredigion		St Padarn's Church, Llanbadarn Fawr	6th century – ?8th century; proposed? in 20th century	Said to have been born in Brittany, the 6th-century bishop-saint Padarn reportedly founded an important clas here. Other bishops seem to have succeeded him, possibly until 720, after which the area came under the authority of St Davids. Collegiate status followed until it became a vicarage in 1231, and the building of the present church began. The 1920 reorganisation of the Church in Wales led to thoughts of cathedral status (to reduce the area of the Diocese of St Davids), and the re-creation of an episcopal see at Llanbadarn, but instead the Diocese of Swansea and Brecon was created in 1923.	52.409°N 4.061°W
Llandeilo, Carmarthenshire		St Teilo's Church, Llandeilo Fawr	6th century – ?11th century	A clas was founded here, supposedly by the 6th-century abbot-bishop Saint Teilo. Several later bishops are recorded, some doubtful, but "the bishops of Teilo have impeccable 9th-century credentials". Notes added to the Lichfield Gospels record Bishop Nobis (or Nyfys) (872?–874) and Bishop Joseph (1022–1045), both later falsely claimed as early bishops of Llandaff. The church was largely rebuilt 1848–1850.	51.88173°N 3.99285°W
Llanynys, Denbighshire		St Saeran's Church, Llanynys	6th century?	Tradition tells that a 6th-century clas (and mother-church for several villages) was founded by bishop-saint Saeran, who may have come from Ireland. Alternatively, St Mor has been suggested as founder, the church being only the burial place of St Saeran. Little is known of either saint. The church on the ancient site is double-naved: the western part of the north nave is 13th-century, the rest built c. 1500. There is a 15th-century wall painting of St Christopher (shown).	53.1536°N 3.3425°W
Rhuddlan, Denbighshire			proposed; site uncertain	In 1281 King Edward I and Anian II, Bishop of St Asaph, petitioned the Pope to approve the transfer of the see of St Asaph to a larger, fortified town being built (for English settlers) at Rhuddlan, due to the claimed remoteness and dangers of St Asaph. However, further English territorial gains led to the proposal's abandonment by 1283. The intended cathedral site was probably used for the new parish church, St Mary's, in c. 1300 (shown).	53.2907°N 3.4696°W
St Asaph, (Llanelwy), Denbighshire		Church of St Kentigern and St Asa; site probable; original dedication unknown	6th century – ?11th century	Jocelyn's Life of Kentigern claims the saint-bishop founded a clas in c. 560 at Llanelwy ("sacred site on the River Elwy"). His successor as bishop was Saint Asaph (or Asaf/Asa), which led to Llanelwy being known (in English) as St Asaph. The site of the original (wooden) cathedral is likely now occupied by the parish church (near the river) at the foot of the hill crowned by the Norman cathedral of the re-established bishopric (1143). The church building dates from the 13th century.	53.25705°N 3.44525°W

=== The Seven Bishop-Houses of the Kingdom of Dyfed ===
Collections of medieval Welsh Law record that the (early medieval) Kingdom of Dyfed had seven so-called "bishop-houses" (in Welsh, esgopty), following a general pattern of one bishop-house in each cantref. Their role is not clear, but they must have been relatively important ecclesiastical sites (with St Davids having a higher status than any of the others). Apart from the Bishop of St Davids, their heads were described as abbots, not bishops.

Whether the other six were also bishoprics, former bishoprics, burial places of saint-bishops, or staging posts in the travels of (say) the bishop of St Davids is debated. They are included here on the basis that any and all of them may well have been the seat of a bishop at some time. Details of all seven bishop-houses are given below for the sake of completeness, although St Davids has never ceased to be the seat of a bishop. The status of a bishop-house, as distinct from that of a cathedral (St Davids), seems not to have survived the ending of the Kingdom of Dyfed (in 920), even less the arrival of the Normans.

The sites identified below may not be exactly the original sites of the bishop-houses (with the probable exception of Llandeilo Llwydarth): some minor relocation over the course of centuries cannot be ruled out.

Location	Image	Medieval Placename (spellings may vary)	Pre-Norman Cantref (spellings may vary)	Notes	Coordinates
St Davids, Pembrokeshire		Mynyw	Prebidiog	St Davids Cathedral has continued to be the seat of a bishop since its foundation in the 6th century. It has never been a 'former cathedral', and is only included here to complete the list of Dyfed's seven bishop-houses	55.469842°N 4.599087°W
Carmarthen, Carmarthenshire		Llan Teulydawc	Gwarthaf	The Normans re-founded an earlier church in c. 1110 as a (claimed) cell of Battle Abbey. In c. 1125 the Bishop of St Davids replaced it with the Priory of St John the Evangelist and St Teulyddog and canons instead of monks (dissolved 1537). The site was cleared c.1781 for industrial use. Almost nothing remains.	51.860149°N 4.296345°W
Clydau, Pembrokeshire		Llan Geneu	Emlyn	The 14th–15th-century parish church (shown) is dedicated to Saint Clydai but the medieval place-name clearly refers to Saint Ceneu. Restored in the late 19th century, the most original parts of the church are its tower and nave. It is sited centrally among the five hamlets it serves.	51.99°N 4.5488°W
Llandeilo Llwydarth, Maenclochog, Pembrokeshire		Llan Teilaw	Deugleddyf (originally) Cemais (later)	A minor pre-Norman boundary change led to the bishop-house "moving" to Cantref Cemais. Dedicated to Saint Teilo, it was abandoned shortly after 1833. The ruin lies in a circular enclosure, with St Teilo's Well nearby. Its water had reputed healing powers when drunk from the saint's supposed skull.	51.908215°N 4.764448°W
Rhoscrowther, Pembrokeshire		Llan Degeman	Penfro	St Decuman's church is now largely isolated by an oil refinery to its north, and an army range to the south. The village was evacuated in 1994 after a refinery explosion. The church is 14th-century (nave and chancel possibly older), restored in the 19th century, and now cared for by Friends of Friendless Churches.	51.6794°N 5.0332°W
Saundersfoot, Pembrokeshire		Llan Ussyllt	Penfro	The town of Saundersfoot lies within the ancient parish called St Issells by the Normans. The parish church, dedicated to Saint Issel, stands about 0.5 miles (1 km) north of the town. Its chancel arch is 13th century and the tower is 14th/15th century; restored 1862–64.	51.7199°N 4.705°W
St Ishmaels, Pembrokeshire		Llan Ismael	Rhos	The original church here was "the home of St Ishmael, who became the second bishop of St Davids in c. 589". The oldest parts of the present church may be 12th century. It is sited about 0.5 miles (0.9 km) south of the village of St Ishmaels, in an area called Monk Haven, with early monastic remains nearby.	51.7173°N 5.1426°W

== Isle of Man ==
While the Isle of Man is not politically part of Great Britain, but ecclesiastically it forms the Diocese of Sodor and Man in the Province of York of the Church of England, and part of the Archdiocese of Liverpool for the Roman Catholic church, so it is included on this List.

The Diocese of Sodor and Man is the English successor to the (first Norwegian, later Scottish) Diocese of Sodor or Diocese of the Isles. The English Crown seized control of the Isle of Man from Scotland during the 14th century, and the island was no longer a component of the ''Sudreys'' (the Hebrides plus the Isle of Man). From that point the Diocese of Sodor and Man was limited to the Isle of Man alone, while the Hebrides formed the Diocese of the Isles in the Scottish Church, with its cathedral no longer at Peel, Isle of Man.

=== Former cathedrals ===
Location	Image	Name	Dates	Notes	Coordinates
Kirk Michael		The Chapel of St Nicholas at Bishopscourt	1895 – 1979	Bishopscourt was the residence of the Bishop of Sodor and Man from the 14th century, with the current house constructed around 1700. In 1895 the chapel was designated as pro-cathedral by Bishop Straton, replacing the ruined St German's Cathedral. In 1979-1980 the estate was sold, the bishop's residence moved to Douglas (the island's capital city), and the parish church of St German, Peel raised to cathedral status. Bishopscourt is now privately owned (no public access).	54.299722°N 4.654167°W
Peel		St German's Cathedral, Peel Castle	5th century?; then 12th century – 1895	Tradition tells that St Patrick built a cathedral on a small tidal islet off the coast, later called St Patrick's Isle. A stone-built monastery followed in c. 900. A new cathedral of St German was established there by the 13th century for the Diocese of Sodor and Man. Unroofed in 1730 by the island's Governor, the building was a ruin by 1780 and later bishops were enthroned at St Mary's, Castletown (now Old St Mary's) or St George's, Douglas, though St German's remained the cathedral until 1895. Peel Castle, including the monastic and old cathedral ruins, is cared for by Manx National Heritage.	54.226217°N 4.698144°W

== See also ==
- Lists of cathedrals in the United Kingdom
- List of cathedrals in Ireland
