= Jack McLeod (disambiguation) =

Jackie McLeod (1930–2022) was a Canadian ice hockey player and coach who played for the New York Rangers and coached Canada at the 1968 Winter Olympics.

Jack McLeod may also refer to:

- Jack McLeod (rugby league), New Zealand rugby league player who represented his country in 1937
- Jack McLeod (footballer, born 1926) (1926–2020), Australian rules footballer who played for Hawthorn
- Jack McLeod (footballer, born 1907) (1907–1974), Australian rules footballer who played for St Kilda
- Jack McLeod (political scientist) (1932–2016), Canadian economist and writer

== See also ==
- John McLeod (disambiguation)
