= Free Church of Scotland (Continuing) =

Scottish Presbyterian denomination

- An Eaglais Shaor Leantainneach
- Classification: Protestant
- Theology: Calvinistic
- Polity: Presbyterian
- Associations: International Conference of Reformed Churches, Affinity
- Origin: 2000
- Separated from: Free Church of Scotland
- Congregations: 25 active congregations in Scotland, 1 in Canada, 1 in Northern Ireland, and 5 overseas in the United States
- Ministers: 25 Ministers in post, plus 5 others not in a post.
- Official website: www.freechurchcontinuing.org

The Free Church of Scotland (Continuing) (FC(C); Scottish Gaelic: An Eaglais Shaor Leantainneach) is a Scottish Presbyterian denomination which was formed in January 2000. It claims to be the true continuation of the Free Church of Scotland, hence its name.

== Formation ==
In 1996, Professor Donald Macleod, later to be principal of the Free Church College in Edinburgh, was acquitted of charges of sexual assault when a sheriff ruled there had been a conspiracy against him. However, within the church, there were many that believed he was guilty, and that the courts of the church should conduct a full investigation of the matter. It divided the church massively: some called from Professor MacLeod to be suspended until further notice, others for all the papers relating to his alleged misconduct to be destroyed. An organisation called the Free Church Defence Association believed that "it was wrong not to put Professor Macleod on trial in the General Assembly, and that the majority has therefore departed from the principle that allegations of misconduct must be investigated, not by a Committee of the General Assembly, but by the whole General Assembly." The FCDA's chairman, Rev Maurice Roberts, was suspended for contumacy in June 1999 for refusing to withdraw his claim that General Assembly in May of that year was characterised by "gross and irremediable wickedness and hypocrisy".

In August 1999, the FCDA's magazine, Free Church Foundations, referred to "the evil of Mr. Roberts' suspension". Following this, a deadline was set for 30 November 1999 for the FCDA to disband, which it did not. Libels were drawn up against 22 ministers who refused to comply, and in a hearing by the Commission of Assembly on 19–20 January 2000 those libels were declared to be relevant. The 22 ministers were suspended, and they responded by leaving the commission.

On 20 January 2000 the 'Free Church of Scotland (Continuing)' was formed when those ministers and a number of others adopted a "Declaration of Reconstitution of the historic Free Church of Scotland". Johnston McKay suggests that although on the surface the split was about Donald Macleod, in reality it was about theology, with the FCDA "composed of people who adhere much more firmly to the Westminster Confession of Faith". It is reasonable to assume that both reasons played a significant part.

=== List of Ministers suspended by the Free Church of Scotland ===
Below are the list of the 22 Ministers of the Free Church of Scotland who were suspended on 20 January 2000, and became the first ministers of the Free Church of Scotland (Continuing).

- Rev. B. H. Baxter
- Rev. Graeme Craig - Lochalsh & Glenshiel
- Rev. H. M. Ferrier
- Rev. J. A. Gillies
- Rev. James I. Gracie - North Uist & Grimsay
- Rev. John W. Keddie - Minister of Bracadale
- Rev. Donald M. Macdonald
- Rev. Kenneth Macdonald - Minister of Snizort
- Rev. Allan I. M. Maciver - Minister of Broadford
- Rev. Malcolm Maclean (retired from North Tolsta)
- Rev. Donald N. MacLeod (retired from Glasgow-Duke Street)
- Rev. John MacLeod - Minister of Tarbat
- Rev. John MacLeod - Minister of Duthil-Dores
- Rev. Murdo A. N. Macleod - Minister of Harris
- Rev. William Macleod - Minister of Portree
- Rev. John Morrison - Minister of Kilmuir & Stenscholl
- Rev. Allan Murray - Minister of Eddrachillis linked with Rogart
- Rev. David P. Murray
- Rev. John J. Murray - Minister of Lochcarron
- Rev. H. R. M. Radcliffe
- Rev. Maurice J. Roberts - Minister of Inverness Greyfriars [had been suspended by the Commission of Assembly on 24 June 1999]
- Rev. Henry J. T. Woods - Minister of Paisley

Furthermore, four other Ministers were suspended separately and became part of the Free Church of Scotland (Continuing).

- Rev. James Frew [Suspended on 14 February]
- Rev. John J. Harding [Suspended on 24 June 1999]
- Rev. Daniel Mackinnon [Suspended on 14 February] - Minister of Kilmorack & Strathglass
- Rev. William B. Scott [Suspended on 29 February] - Minister of Dumfries

== Legal issues ==
Following their departure, the FC(C) sought a declarator from the Court of Session as to ownership of the central funds and certain Continuing-affiliated properties of the Church. When the appeal was sent to the Outer House of the Court of Session, Lady Paton dismissed their action without granting absolvitor. In March 2007 the Free Church of Scotland proceeded to take legal action at Broadford, on the island of Skye, seeking to reclaim the church manse. The Free Church (Continuing) lost the action at first instance on the decision of Lord Uist, and also lost their appeal to the Inner House of the Court of Session.

The FC(C) expressed its intention to appeal both the above decisions, but in 2009, the International Conference of Reformed Churches noted that the FC(C) had "withdrawn its appeal of the civil matter that was pending".

== Recognition ==
The denomination is a member of the International Conference of Reformed Churches and of Affinity.

== Statistics ==
At the General Assembly of 2025, it was reported that the Free Church Continuing had "thirty ministers in the UK, sixteen of whom are in Charges, and just over 1,000 people, made up of communicant members, adherents and children." Like many denominations in the Western world, the denomination has declined throughout its existence. The report commentated, "Not so long ago one congregation in the Isle of Lewis had the same number of people served by just one minister."

== Congregations ==
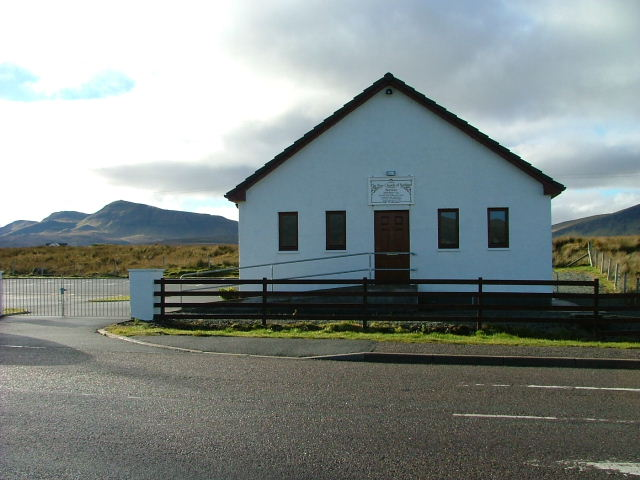
The FC(C) church building in Staffin

The Free Church of Scotland (Continuing) presently has 25 functioning congregations in Scotland, as well as others overseas. These churches belong to six presbyteries: the Northern Presbytery, the Presbytery of Skye and Lochcarron, the Presbytery of United States of America, the Presbytery of Navarre & Aragon, the Outer Hebrides Presbyteery and the Southern Presbytery. There are seven congregations and preaching stations in the United States: Atlanta metropolitan area; Washington Metro; Upstate South Carolina; Mebane, North Carolina; St. Louis, Missouri; Opelika, Alabama; Greenville, Texas; and Fredericksburg, Virginia. There is also a congregation and a preaching station in Canada, a congregation in Northern Ireland, and a seminars and demonstration farm in Zambia.

Church	Location	Presbytery	Minister	Active	Web	Founded
Cross (Ness) FCSC	North Dell, Na h-Eileanan Siar	Outer Hebrides	Rev. Greg MacDonald			2000
Harris FCSC	Northton, Na h-Eileanan Siar	Outer Hebrides	Rev. James Clark			2000
Knock and Point FCSC	Garrabost, Na h-Eileanan Siar	Outer Hebrides	Rev. Ian Hall			2000
North Uist and Grimsay FCSC	Bayhead, Na h-Eileanan Siar	Outer Hebrides	Rev. David M Blunt			2000
Scalpay Harris FCSC	Scalpay, Na h-Eileanan Siar	Outer Hebrides	Rev. Raymond A Kemp			2000
Shawbost (Bragar)	Shawbost	Outer Hebrides	Vacant	No services. Linked with Stornoway.		2000
Stornoway FCSC	Stornoway, Na h-Eileanan Siar & Bragar	Outer Hebrides	Rev. Alan Blaney			2000
Assynt and Eddrachillis FCSC	Scourie and Lochinver, Highland	Northern	Vacant			2000
Brora FCSC	Brora, Highland	Northern	Rev. Thomas J Buchanan			2000
Duthil-Dores FCSC	Dores, Highland	Northern	Rev. Davide Ratti			2000
Grace Reformed Church, Aberdeen	Aberdeen, Aberdeen	Northern	Rev. Timothy J McGlynn			2000
Inverness-Greyfriars FCSC	Inverness, Highland	Northern	Vacant			2000
Kilmorack and Strathglass FCSC	Beauly, Highland	Northern	Vacant			2000
Kiltearn FCSC	Evanton, Highland	Northern	Vacant	No services.		2000
Poolewe and Aultbea FCSC	Aultbea, Highland	Northern	Vacant			2000
Tarbat FCSC	Portmahomack and Inver, Highland	Northern	Rev. Kevin. N. MacDonald			2000
Bracadale & Duirinish (Struan & Waternish) FCSC	Struan and Carbost, Highland	Skye and Lochcarron	Vacant			2000
Broadford	Broadford, Skye	Skye and Lochcarron	Rev. A James MacInnes	No services.		2000
Lochalsh & Strath FCSC	Ardelve, Highland	Skye and Lochcarron	Rev. A James MacInnes			2000
Snizort FCSC	Skeabost, Highland	Skye and Lochcarron	Rev. Murdo A N Macleod			2000
Kilmuir and Stenscholl FCSC	Staffin, Highland	Skye and Lochcarron	Vacant			2000
Portree FCSC	Portree, Highland	Skye and Lochcarron	Rev. Richard R Ross			2000
Arran (Brodick) FCSC	Brodick, North Ayrshire	Southern	Vacant	No services held. Remaining members worship with local FC.		2000
Bethel Free Church, Ayr	Ayr, South Ayrshire	Southern	Rev. Graeme Craig			2000
St Columba's FCSC, Edinburgh	Edinburgh & Galashiels, Borders	Southern	Rev. James I Gracie	Has an outreach in Galashiels.		2000
Knightswood FCSC	Knightswood, Glasgow	Southern	Vacant			2000
Partick FCSC	Partick, Glasgow	Southern	Rev. Andrew R Allan			2000
Shettleston FCSC	Shettleston, Glasgow	Southern	Vacant			2000
Rothesay	Rothesay, Argyll and Bute	Southern	Vacant			2000
Ballyclare and Doagh FCSC	Doagh, Antrim & Portavogie, Down [Northern Ireland]	Southern	Rev. E Trevor Kirkland		Free Church (Continuing) website	2014 (began in 1989 as Templepatrick Reformed Church, before a group within chose to withdraw from it in November 2013 )
Cornerstone Presbyterian Church	Burlington, North Carolina	United States	Rev. Gavin Beers			2016
Dallas Presbyterian Church	Dallas	United States	Vacant			2015 as RPCNA (joined FCC in 2024)
Greenville Presbyterian Church	Greenville, South Carolina	United States	Rev. Robert D McCurley			2007
Metropolitan Presbyterian Church, Washington	Washington, D. C.	United States	Vacant	No services at present		2003
Providence Presbyterian Church	Opelika, Alabama	United States	Rev. J Logan Shelton			2023
Reformation Presbyterian Church	Atlanta, Georgia	United States	Rev. Tyler. J. Ray			2006
Sovereign Grace Presbyterian Church, St Louis	St Louis, Missouri	United States	Rev. Jonathan Mattull			2008
Zion Presbyterian Church	Fredericksburg, Virginia	United States	Rev. Rom Prakashpalan			2024
Iglesia Reformada Continuada	Rubí, Spain	Navarre & Aragon	Rev. Jorge Ruiz Ortiz			2015
Igreja Presbiteriana de Braga	Braga, Portugal	Navarre & Aragon	Vacant			2017 (joined FCC in 2022)
Pau	Pau, France	Navarre & Aragon	Rev. Hughes Pierre			2021

=== Preaching Stations and Missions ===
Iglesia Presbiteriana Reformada de Nuevo Laredo	Nuevo Laredo, Mexico	United States	Vacant	
Nobleford Presbyterian Church	Nobleford, Canada	United States	Vacant	2022
Reformed Presbyterian Mission	Vavuniya, Sri Lanka	Home & Foreign Missions Committee	Rev. Shanmugam N.V. Partheepan	2012
Westminster Presbyterian Church	Greenville, Texas	United States	Rev. Craig J. Scott	2022
Philadelphia Presbyterian Church	Blue Bell, Pennsylvania	United States	Vacant	2025

== Seminary ==
The Free Church of Scotland (Continuing) maintains a seminary on the outskirts of Inverness for the training of its ministers, which has been the location since 2008. Most classes are online, but the library and some classrooms are based at The Inverness-Greyfriars (Westhill) Church in Inverness. In October 2002, the Commission of Assembly appointed the relevant lecturers for the new seminary. The first students began in 2003. The degree program usually takes three years of full time study. The denomination, since its formation, has a new minister starting roughly once a year. The 2018 directory listed seven ministers who were serving who were ordained between 2000 and 2009. There were 10 ministers serving who were ordained in the following decade (2010 to 2019) Furthermore, the website lists five further ministers ordained from 2020 - 2025 (although, some have been received from other denominations).

== Music ==
The Free Church Continuing continues to hold to the exclusive use of metrical Psalms sung without instrumental accompaniment in worship, a position which the Free Church of Scotland has ceased to hold.

== See also ==
- John MacLeod, Principal Clerk of Assembly, Moderator of 2006 General Assembly
