= Snizort =

Coordinates: 57°31.5′N 6°21.5′W

Snizort (Scottish Gaelic: Snìosort) is a civil parish in the north-eastern part of the Isle of Skye, comprising the head of Loch Snizort and the western coast of Trotternish up to Uig, which is the largest settlement.

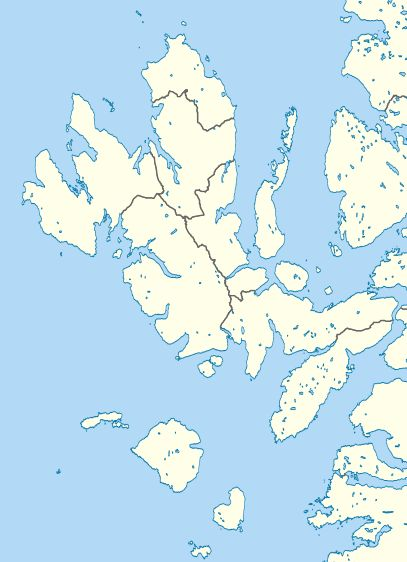

The remains of Snizort Cathedral are on an island in the river Snizort, in the south of the parish.

== See also ==
Snizort Free Church

== Sources ==
- Macleod, Roderick (1845). "Parish of Snizort". The new statistical account of Scotland. [electronic resource]. Vol. 14. Edinburgh and London: William Blackwood and Sons. pp. 287-295.
