= Dioceses of Scotland in the High and Later Middle Ages =

The Roman Catholic dioceses of Scotland in the High and Later Middle Ages were:

Diocese	Cathedral	Notes
Aberdeen	Old Aberdeen	see sometimes said to have been translated from Mortlach (now Dufftown) in 1132—but this origin countered by claim that Aberdeen Cathedral and diocese were fresh creations
Argyll	Lismore	it was suggested moving the cathedral to Saddell Abbey, but this did not transpire
Brechin	Brechin	
Caithness	Dornoch	cathedral originally at Halkirk
Dunblane	Dunblane	prior to settling at Dunblane, cathedrals were at Abernethy (probably) and Muthill. A proposal to move the cathedral from Dunblane to Inchaffray Abbey did not transpire.
Dunkeld	Dunkeld	
Galloway	Whithorn	earlier cathedral of Candida Casa nearby.
Glasgow	Glasgow	Metropolitan since 1492
Moray	Elgin	prior to settling at Elgin, cathedrals were at Birnie, Spynie and at Kinneddar
Orkney	Kirkwall	cathedral originally at Birsay
Ross	Fortrose	cathedral originally at Rosemarkie
St Andrews	St Andrews	Metropolitan since 1472. earlier cathedral (church of St Regulus) nearby.
The Isles	Iona	diocese founded at Old St German's Cathedral, Peel Castle, Isle of Man as the Diocese of Sodor comprising the Hebrides and the Isle of Man. When the Isle of Man came under English control in the 14th century the Scottish Diocese of the Isles was created, covering the Hebrides only, with its original cathedral at Skeabost, Isle of Skye

== See also ==
- List of former cathedrals in Great Britain
- List of cathedrals in the United Kingdom
