= EVQ =

EVQ may refer to:

== EVQ ==
- Abbreviation of Extravehicular Activity Qualification, training flow developed by Tracy Caldwell Dyson

== EvQ ==
- EvQ, abbreviation for Evangelical Quarterly
