= John MacLeod =

John MacLeod may refer to:

== Politics ==
- John Norman MacLeod (1788–1835), British Member of Parliament for Sudbury, 1828–1830
- Sir John MacLeod, 1st Baronet (1857–1934), British Member of Parliament for Glasgow Kelvingrove, 1918–1922
- John Macleod (Sutherland MP) (1862–1931), Member of Parliament for Sutherland, 1894–1900
- Sir John MacLeod (solicitor) (1873–1946), Lord Provost of Edinburgh, 1916–1919
- Sir John MacLeod (Ross and Cromarty MP) (1913–1984), Member of Parliament for Ross and Cromarty, 1945–1964
- John MacLeod (clan chief), 16th-century clan chieftain, of the Isle of Lewis in the 1520s and 1530s
- John MacLeod of MacLeod (1935–2007), 29th chief of the Scottish clan Clan MacLeod

== Sports ==
- John MacLeod (basketball) (1937–2019), American basketball coach
- Johnny MacLeod (born 1938), Scottish footballer
- John MacLeod (rugby union) (born 1973), Scottish former rugby union player for Glasgow Warriors
- Jack Macleod (born 1988), English footballer
- John MacLeod (canoeist) (born 1947), British slalom canoeist
- John MacLeod (water polo) (born 1957), Canadian Olympic water polo player

== Other ==
- John Macleod (British Army officer) (1752–1833), British general
- John Macleod (theologian) (1872–1948), Scottish minister and Principal of the Free Church College
- John Macleod (physiologist) (1876–1935), Scottish physician, physiologist and Nobel Laureate
- John George Macleod (1915–2006), Scottish doctor of medicine and writer of medical textbooks
- John MacLeod (moderator) (1926–2002), Moderator of the General Assembly of the Free Church of Scotland 1983/84
- John MacLeod (minister) (1948–2021), minister of the Free Church of Scotland (Continuing)
- John Macleod (songwriter), English songwriter and musician
- John MacLeod, fictional character in Highlander III: The Sorcerer

== See also ==
- John McLeod (disambiguation)
