= Roderick McLeod (minister) =

Scottish minister

Roderick M'Leod
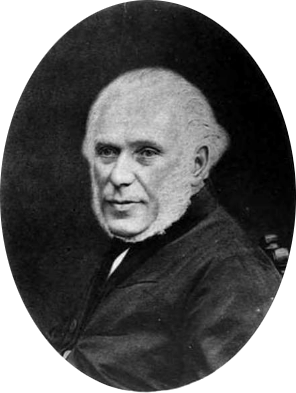
- Roderick M'Leod from Disruption Worthies of the Highlands

Personal details
- Born: 1794
- Died: 1868 (aged 73–74)

Roderick McLeod (1794–1868) was a Scottish minister of the Free Church of Scotland who served as Moderator of the General Assembly 1863/64.

== Life ==
He was born at Glen Haltin on Skye in 1794, the son of Rev McLeod parish minister of Snizort, and grandson of McLeod of Raasay. Roderick studied Divinity at Aberdeen University. He was licensed to preach by the Church of Scotland's Presbytery of Skye and began work in a mission at Lynedale in his father's parish in 1818. He was translated to Bracadale. He was suspended for refusing to baptise a child. In 1823 he was translated to Snizort in 1838 to replace his father.

He left the established church in the Disruption of 1843 to join the Free Church of Scotland and rapidly became the dominant figure representing the Free Church on Skye and surrounding islands. In 1863 he succeeded Rev Thomas Guthrie as Moderator of the General Assembly, the highest position in the Free Church. He was succeeded in turn in 1864 by Rev Patrick Fairbairn.

He became ill in 1864 but continued his work, but died in April 1868 and his position at Snizort was filled by the Rev Joseph Lamont.

== Family ==
He was married to Anne R. McDonald of Skeabost (d.1856). They had thirteen children.

His sister Isabella Margaret McLeod married Rev John Finlayson, who had replaced him as minister of Bracadale.
