= John J. Murray =

John J. Murray (1934 – 1 April 2020) was a Scottish minister and author.

Murray was born in Lonemore, Sutherland. In 1955 he moved to Edinburgh to work for Caledonian Insurance, and also started a magazine called Eternal Truth. In 1960 he moved to London to work for the Banner of Truth Trust. He belonged to the Free Church of Scotland but also attended the evening services of Westminster Chapel, where Martyn Lloyd-Jones was the minister.

Murray was ordained as a minister of the Free Church in 1978, and served in Oban and Edinburgh. He joined the Free Church (Continuing) at its formation in 2000.

Murray married Cynthia in 1966, and they had children. His booklet Behind a Frowning Providence (Banner of Truth, 1990) was written in response to his daughter's death in 1980.

Catch the Vision (Evangelical Press, 2007) was Murray's seminal work, in which he discussed the re-emergence of Calvinism in the United Kingdom, largely through the ministry of Lloyd-Jones. He also argued that "the zeal for reformed theology and books in the 1960's did not convert into a lasting reformation and revival."

Murray died from COVID-19 on 1 April 2020 in Glasgow.
