= Donald Maclean (principal) =

British theologian and minister

Donald Maclean (1869–1943) was a Scottish minister and theologian who played a significant role in the Free Church of Scotland during a period of ecclesiastical upheaval in the early 20th century. He was principal of the Free Church College in Edinburgh. He was appointed professor of church history and church principles in 1920, and principal in 1942, but died the following year. He also co-founded The Evangelical Quarterly.

== Early life and education ==
Donald MacLean was born in September 1869 in Lochcarron, Ross-shire, Scotland. He spent his boyhood in the Highland region, which likely influenced his later interests and character. MacLean attended the University of Aberdeen at a young age, where he distinguished himself academically. He later studied at New College and the University of Edinburgh, where he furthered his Celtic studies alongside his theological education.

== Ministerial career ==
=== Early ministry ===
MacLean began his ministerial career as the minister of Moy Free Church from 1897 to 1905. He was one of the 26 ministers who remained with the Free Church after the Union of 1900, which saw the majority of Free Church congregations join with the United Presbyterian Church of Scotland to form the United Free Church of Scotland. This decision, while principled, caused him personal pain.

=== St Columba's Free Church ===
In 1905, MacLean was called to St Columba's Free Church in Edinburgh. This congregation had experienced significant turmoil following the 1900 Union. The previous minister, Rev. Malcolm Maclennan, D.D., had joined the United Free Church along with a majority of the congregation. A minority group, however, remained loyal to the Free Church and initially met in temporary locations. Following a House of Lords judgment that ruled the continuing Free Church as the true heir of the original Free Church, the St Columba's congregation reoccupied their church buildings on Cambridge Street on 9 April 1904. MacLean was inducted as their pastor on 9 August 1905. Under MacLean's leadership, the congregation experienced remarkable growth. By July 1906, church membership had increased to over 500, and by the end of that year, it approached 600.

=== Challenges and relocation ===
MacLean's ministry faced a significant challenge when the Executive Commission, established by the Government under Lord Elgin's chairmanship, decided on 23 October 1906 to allocate St Columba's to the United Free Church. This decision was based on the assessment that the Free Church congregation was not capable of managing the property. Despite this setback, MacLean's leadership inspired the congregation during these difficult times. Under Maclean's guidance, the congregation petitioned the Commission, highlighting their growth and the importance of their ministry. This led to a reconsideration and eventually resulted in the allocation of St John's Church to the Free Church in 1907, which they adapted to serve as the annual meeting place of the Free Church General Assembly, as well as becoming the new home for St Columba's congregation until present days.

=== Transition to St John's Building ===
In May 1907, Maclean led the St Columba's congregation into their new place of worship, formerly St John's Church. At the first service in the new building, Maclean addressed the congregation, acknowledging their loyalty and patience through years of uncertainty. He reaffirmed his commitment to preaching the Gospel, stating, 'I shall have no message to give but one, and no other message honouring to God is known to me than that Christ came to seek and save that which was lost.'

Throughout this transition, Maclean provided steady leadership and pastoral care, maintaining the congregation's unity and even fostering growth. Maclean saw himself and his congregation as continuing in the tradition of the original Free Church, even as they occupied a building with a different history. He stated, 'We claim without presumption to be the lineal descendants of the Church which Guthrie adorned,' referring to Thomas Guthrie, the renowned 19th-century preacher who had been the first minister of St John's. In the new location, he continued the practice of bilingual ministry, holding services in both Gaelic and English to serve the diverse needs of his flock. He was also involved in practical church administration, including negotiations over the use and maintenance of the new building, which served both as a local place of worship and as the Assembly Hall for the Free Church of Scotland.

=== Later career and achievements ===
In 1918, the General Assembly transferred MacLean to the full-time appointment of Secretary of the Highlands and Islands, Home Mission, and Supply Committee. Two years later, in 1920, he became Professor of Church History and Church Principles in the Free Church College (now Edinburgh Theological Seminary).

MacLean's contributions to the church and academia were widely recognized:

- The University of Aberdeen conferred a Doctorate of Divinity upon him in 1920.
- He was twice (1919 & 1937) called to serve as Moderator of the General Assembly of the Free Church.
- Shortly before his death, he was appointed Principal of the Free Church College. MacLean died on 30 January 1943 while serving as Principal.

== Scholarly work and legacy ==
MacLean was the founder and editor of the Evangelical Quarterly, a theological review he established and led for 15 years until his death. The journal was international in scope and dedicated to the defense of historic Christian faith.

As editor, MacLean was known for his "informed and fearless witness for the Faith" and his strong championship of Reformed Doctrine. His work with the Quarterly helped him develop personal friendships with Reformed leaders across Europe, Africa, the United States, and Australia, who held him in high esteem.

MacLean's leadership extended beyond his editorial role. In 1909, he was appointed as a member of the Commission of Assembly, a body granted broad powers to make decisions on behalf of the church, particularly regarding the "exceptional circumstances" it was facing in the wake of the 1905 Churches (Scotland) Act. This appointment underscores his prominence and authority within the Free Church during a turbulent period in its history.

Colleagues remembered MacLean for his "unflinchingly upright character and warm-hearted friendship." His scholarly contributions and editorial work with the Evangelical Quarterly played a significant role in strengthening and consolidating Reformed Theology in the early 20th century. He played a prominent role in the Alliance of Reformed Churches holding the Presbyterian System, representing the Free Church of Scotland. His influence was particularly strong in the Netherlands, Switzerland, Czechoslovakia, and among the Confessional Church in Germany. Five years before his death, MacLean appointed Professor J. H. S. Burleigh as Assistant Editor of the Evangelical Quarterly, ensuring the continuation of his scholarly legacy.

Even after leaving his pastoral role at St Columba's, MacLean maintained his association with the congregation until his death. He regularly worshipped there and served as a member of the Kirk Session. Donald MacLean's career spanned a crucial period in Scottish church history, and his leadership, scholarship, and editorial work left a lasting impact on the Free Church of Scotland and the broader Reformed tradition.

=== World War I contribution ===
During World War I, MacLean organized support for Gaelic-speaking soldiers, sailors, and prisoners of war. His efforts were publicly acknowledged in the House of Commons.

== Publications ==
Rev. Maclean was a voluminous writer, his best-known publications being:

- Duthil: Past and Present (1910)
- Travels in Sunny Lands (1911)
- The Literature of the Scottish Gael (1912)
- The Spiritual Songs of Dugald Buchanan (revised edition)(1913)
- The Law of the Lord’s Day in the Celtic Church (1926)
- Aspects of Scottish Church History (1927)
- The Counter-Reformation in Scotland, 1560-1930 (1931).

MacLean was a prolific scholar, particularly in Celtic studies. His notable works include:

- Translations of the Gaelic Poems of Dugald Buchanan
- Translation and commentary on the Cain Domnaig (Law of the Lord's Day)
