= Halkirk Auld Kirk =

Coordinates: 58.516869°N 3.486298°W

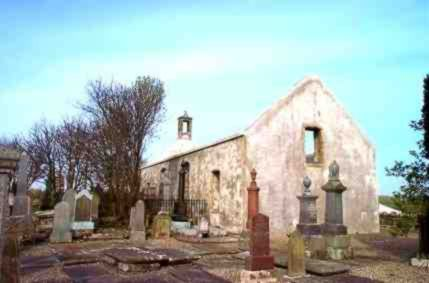
Auld Kirk

Halkirk Auld Kirk is a former parish church in Halkirk, Caithness, Scotland. Built in 1753, it stopped being used in 1934 and is now a ruin. Halkirk parish was formed at the time of the Reformation by the union of the Halkirk and Skinnet districts. The "Halkirk Village Old Parish Church And Burial Ground" is a category B listed building.

== Geography ==
The church is situated on the east side of the River Thurso. Situated close to Skinnet, it is on the right bank of the water on a small round hill in the middle of an extensive plain. The glebe measured from 7.5–8 acres (3.0–3.2 ha), which included the manse site and garden.

== History ==
The church of Halkirk, originally only a chapel attached to the bishop's residence, was dedicated to Saint Catharine, or according to some, to Saint Fergus. The Auld Kirk was built in 1753 upon the same site. The Georgian T-plan design was built to accommodate about 756 individuals, and underwent a substantial repair in 1833. The manse was built about the same time as the church, and underwent some repairs in 1823. By the mid 20th century, the interior had been greatly altered internally and the building was in a decaying state.

== See also ==
- List of former cathedrals in the United Kingdom
