= Snizort Free Church =

Coordinates: 57.5856°N 6.3563°W

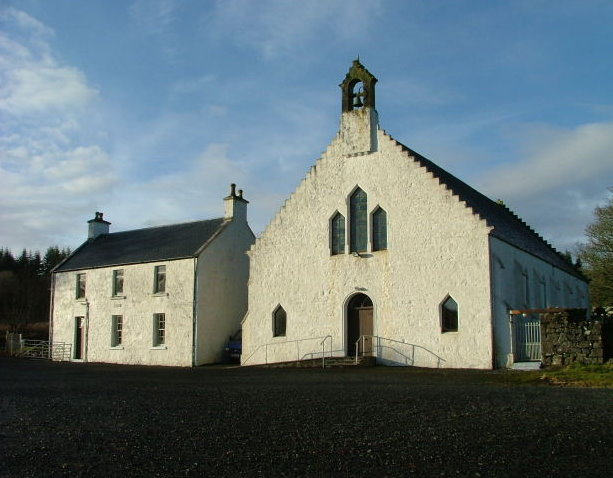
- Snizort Free Church of Scotland
- Snizort Free Church
- Location: A850 road, Skye
- Country: Scotland
- Denomination: Free Church of Scotland (Continuing)
- Website: Free Church

History
- Founded: 1843

Architecture
- Functional status: church
- Heritage designation: Historic Scotland, ID 13978

The Snizort Free Church, is a place of worship of the Free Church of Scotland (Continuing) in the township of Skeabost in Snizort on the island of Skye.

The church was built in 1847, and was led for some time by Roderick Macleod.

In 2023, the minister was Rev. Murdo A N Macleod.
