= List of listed buildings in Halkirk, Highland =

This is a list of listed buildings in the parish of Halkirk in Highland, Scotland.

== List ==
Name	Location	Date Listed	Grid Ref. (Note: Sometimes known as OSGB36, the grid reference (where provided) is based on the British national grid reference system used by the Ordnance Survey. • "Guide to National Grid". Ordnance Survey. • "Get-a-map". Ordnance Survey.)	Geo-coordinates	Notes	LB Number (Note: Historic Environment Scotland assign a unique alphanumeric identifier to each designated site in Scotland, for listed buildings this always begins with "LB", for example "LB12345".)	Image
Westerdale Church Wall And Gates				58°26′40″N 3°29′39″W	Category B	7806	Upload Photo
Westfield, Bridge Of, Over Forss Water				58°33′20″N 3°37′29″W	Category B	7795	Upload Photo
Westfield Farmhouse, Adjoining Range Of Dwellings And Dovecote				58°33′20″N 3°36′41″W	Category B	7796	Upload Photo
Lochdhu Lodge				58°22′30″N 3°41′32″W	Category B	7802	Upload Photo
Halkirk Village, Bridge Street, Ross Institute Gate Piers And Walls				58°30′52″N 3°29′43″W	Category C(S)	7800	Upload Photo
Strathmore Lodge				58°24′38″N 3°32′18″W	Category C(S)	7804	Upload Photo
Westerdale Bridge Over River Thurso				58°26′46″N 3°29′27″W	Category B	7805	Upload Photo
Westerdale Dale House				58°27′01″N 3°29′34″W	Category B	7793	Upload Photo
Calder Mains Steading Manse				58°31′03″N 3°33′19″W	Category B	7798	Upload Photo
Halkirk Village, Bridge Street, Church Of Scotland And Gate Piers				58°30′51″N 3°29′43″W	Category B	7799	Upload Photo
Westerdale Dale House Dovecote And Walled Garden				58°26′55″N 3°29′35″W	Category B	7794	Upload Photo
Halkirk Village Old Parish Church And Burial Ground				58°31′01″N 3°29′11″W	Category B	7801	Upload Photo
Loch More Bridge Over River Thurso				58°23′42″N 3°35′19″W	Category B	7803	Upload Photo
Skinnet House				58°32′06″N 3°29′58″W	Category B	10812	Upload Photo

== Key ==
The scheme for classifying buildings in Scotland is:

- Category A: "buildings of national or international importance, either architectural or historic; or fine, little-altered examples of some particular period, style or building type."
- Category B: "buildings of regional or more than local importance; or major examples of some particular period, style or building type, which may have been altered."
- Category C: "buildings of local importance; lesser examples of any period, style, or building type, as originally constructed or moderately altered; and simple traditional buildings which group well with other listed buildings."

In March 2016 there were 47,288 listed buildings in Scotland. Of these, 8% were Category A, and 50% were Category B, with the remaining 42% being Category C.

== See also ==
- List of listed buildings in Highland
