= Jack McLeod (footballer, born 1907) =

Australian rules footballer, born 1907

Personal information
- Full name: Jack McLeod
- Born: 8 August 1907
- Died: 7 August 1974 (aged 66)
- Original team: Bairnsdale
- Height: 185 cm (6 ft 1 in)
- Weight: 88 kg (194 lb)

Playing career^{1}
Years	Club	Games (Goals)
1933	St Kilda	2 (0)
- ^{1} Playing statistics correct to the end of 1933.

Jack McLeod (8 August 1907 – 7 August 1974) was an Australian rules footballer who played with St Kilda in the Victorian Football League (VFL).
