= John McLeod (footballer, born 1888) =

Scottish footballer

Personal information
- Date of birth: 1888
- Place of birth: Inverness, Scotland
- Position: Right back

Senior career*
Years	Team	Apps	(Gls)
19??–1910	Inverness Caledonian		
	Hull City	0	(0)
1910–1911	Bury	2	(1)
1911–1912	Darlington		(3)
1912	Hurst	1	(0)
- * Club domestic league appearances and goals

John A. McLeod (1888 – after 1912) was a Scottish footballer who played as a right back in the Football League for Bury. He played domestically for Inverness Caledonian and in English non-league football for Hull City, Darlington and Hurst.

== Life and career ==
McLeod was born in Inverness in 1888. He played football for his hometown team, Inverness Caledonian of the Highland League, before moving to England in April 1910 to join Football League First Division club Bury.

He made his first appearance for their reserve team in a Lancashire Combination defeat to Manchester City's reserves on 11 April, and made his first-team debut on the last day of the 1909–10 Football League season, at home to Blackburn Rovers in the First Division. A "tall, muscular and heavy" man whose "methods were crude", the contrast between his lack of technique and the "intense seriousness" with which he pursued his task caused the crowd considerable amusement. On the other hand, "his unflagging energy and his desire to render good service were very apparent", he produced a headed clearance with his goalkeeper beaten that prevented the visitors from equalising, and his dribble from the full-back position to within 25 yards (23 m) of goal was instrumental in Bury going 2–0 ahead. The match ended as a 2–1 win. He appeared only once more for Bury's first team, in the visit to Blackburn Rovers in January 1911. Standing in for the unfit Tom Millington, McLeod scored with a penalty kick, but Blackburn won 6–2.

McLeod was transfer-listed at the end of the season, and moved on to Darlington. He played twice during their run to the second round (last 32) of the 1911–12 FA Cup – Dick Jackson was preferred in the other matches – and scored three goals as Darlington finished third in the North-Eastern League. McLeod moved on again at the end of the season, to Hurst, newly admitted to the Lancashire Combination. He played in their opening fixture, an 8–2 win against Oswestry United, but never appeared again.
