= John MacLeod (minister) =

Minister of the Free Church of Scotland

John MacLeod (born 14 May 1948 in Fearn, Scotland – died 17 December 2020 in Portmahomack, Scotland), known in Scottish Gaelic as Iain MacLeòid, was a minister of the Free Church of Scotland (Continuing). He came to prominence in connection with allegations against Donald Macleod, which later resulted in the formation of the Free Church (Continuing).

== Early life ==
MacLeod grew up in Fearn. Upon finishing school, he was educated at the University of Aberdeen. After graduating, he worked for two years as an insurance underwriter with Standard Life before his ministry career.

== Career ==
After two years working for Standard Life, MacLeod studied at the Free Church College, Edinburgh, graduating in 1974. From there, he worked among students in Aberdeen for two years, before going ton to spend a further two years preaching in North America. He was inducted into the (then) Free Church of Scotland parish of Tarbat (centred around Portmahomack) in 1978. He was minister there until his death.

He came to prominence in connection with allegations against Donald Macleod, Professor of Systematic Theology at the Free Church College: the professor was answerable to the Training of the Ministry Committee, of which Rev. MacLeod was clerk.

This led, in January 2000, to an attempt to suspend him and over twenty other ministers from the functions of the ministry and to their formation of the Free Church of Scotland (Continuing), of which MacLeod was subsequently appointed the Principal Clerk of Assembly. The Sunday following the split of the denominations, the Free Church maintained that the charge was now vacant, but MacLeod and the congregation turned up as normal for worship, causing issues when the minister, and an Elder, of Rosskeen Free Church showed up to preach (because it was deemed that MacLeod was no longer the minister).

He was Moderator of the 2006 FCC General Assembly. He was nominated to be the Moderator again for the 2020 General Assembly of the Free Church (Continuing), although it was suspended because of the Covid Pandemic.

Notable Quote: Scot minister and professor John MacLeod described pre-Reformation Scotland: ”It had a weak central executive, a turbulent aristocracy, a bloated church [owning half the land], and a downtrodden commonalty. There was hardly a country in Europe that was more backward in civilization, or one in which life and property were less secure.”

== Personal life and death ==
Macleod died suddenly on 17 December 2020 at the age of 72. He died while on the way from the church manse to the Tarbat Church to adjust the Church noticeboard. He was married to Joy Morrison, who was a native of Prince Edward Island, Canada. Together they had nine children, as well as 14 grandchildren.

His funeral took place on 24 December 2020 at Tarbat Free Church (continuing). He was buried in Tarbat New Cemetery.
