= John McLeod (rugby league) =

Australian rugby league footballer

Personal information
- Full name: John McLeod
- Born: 27 June 1957 (age 69) Collinsville, Queensland, Australia

Playing information
- Position: Second-row, Prop
Club
Years	Team	Pld	T	G	FG	P
19??–??	Fortitude Valley
1980–81	Western Suburbs	21	4	0	0	12
1982–84	Canberra Raiders	50	3	0	0	9
	Total	71	7	0	0	21
- Source: As of 27 February 2019

John McLeod (born 27 June 1957) is an Australian former professional rugby league footballer who played in the 1980s. McLeod played for Western Suburbs and Canberra in the NSWRL competition. McLeod was a foundation player for Canberra playing in the club's first ever game.

== Background ==
McLeod was born in Cairns, Queensland, Australia. McLeod played with Fortitude Valley club in the Brisbane Rugby League premiership, winning the competition with them in 1979.

== Playing career ==
McLeod made his first grade debut in the NSWRL competition for Western Suburbs in 1980. McLeod played for Wests when the club went through a turn of good fortune becoming a competitive side under coach Roy Masters. McLeod's first season saw Wests finish 4th and qualify for the finals. The club reached the preliminary final with McLeod playing in the match but Western Suburbs were thrashed by Eastern Suburbs 41–5 at the Sydney Cricket Ground.

McLeod played on in 1981 with Wests but departed the side at the end of the season to join newly admitted side Canberra. McLeod played in Canberra's first ever game which was a 37–7 loss against South Sydney at Redfern Oval.

McLeod played in Canberra's first win which was in Round 8 1982 where the club defeated Newtown 12–11. Canberra went on to win only 3 more games for the rest of the season and they finished last claiming the wooden spoon.

McLeod played with Canberra until the end of the 1984 season before departing the club. McLeod then went on to captain-coach Narooma, Cowra and Armidale in the Country Rugby League competitions before retiring in 1989.

== Post playing ==
In 1989, McLeod's foot was crushed by a car and in 1992 he had one leg amputated. McLeod went on to represent the Australian disabled team at the Far Eastern and Southern Games in China in 1992. In 2004, McLeod's other leg was amputated after suffering an infection post surgery on his knee.
