= Evangelical Quarterly =

- Discipline: Theology, biblical studies
- Language: English
- Edited by: Richard Snoddy, John Nolland

Publication details
- History: 1929-present
- Publisher: Brill
- Frequency: Quarterly

Standard abbreviations
- ISO 4: Evang. Q.

Indexing
- ISSN: 0014-3367
- LCCN: 83642987
- OCLC no.: 643795714

Links
- Journal homepage; Online tables of contents

Evangelical Quarterly (abbreviated EQ or EvQ) is an academic journal covering theology and biblical studies. It was established in 1929 by Donald Maclean and J. R. Mackay. The current editors are Richard Snoddy and John Nolland. The book reviews editor is Michael A. G. Haykin.

Kenneth J. Stewart notes that the Evangelical Quarterly started the same year that The Princeton Theological Review ceased publication, and argues that it "commenced where the old journal had left off". Stewart that in the early decades of the Evangelical Quarterly, "one finds the senior generation of Princeton scholars continuing to advance their orthodox Calvinist views in the company of other scholars from within the USA, Great Britain, the Netherlands, Canada, Australia, France, Germany, Hungary, and South Africa."
