= Jack McLeod (political scientist) =

Canadian economist and writer

John Tennyson McLeod (1932–2016) was a Canadian economist and writer of humorous novels.

Born in Regina, he received BA and MA degrees from the University of Saskatchewan, where his teachers included Mabel F. Timlin, and his PhD in economics at the University of Toronto. He was professor of political science there from 1959 to 1996. He also wrote frequently for Canadian newspapers as a political journalist including The Globe and Mail, Toronto Star, Canadian Forum and others.

His fiction, such as Zinger and Me (1979) and Going Grand (1983), satirized Canadian politics and academia. Two of his comic novels were shortlisted for the Stephen Leacock Memorial Medal for Humour.

He died in 2016 at his home in Toronto.
