= Snizort Cathedral =

Cathedral church on Skye, Highland, Scotland

Coordinates: 57.4532°N 6.3057°W

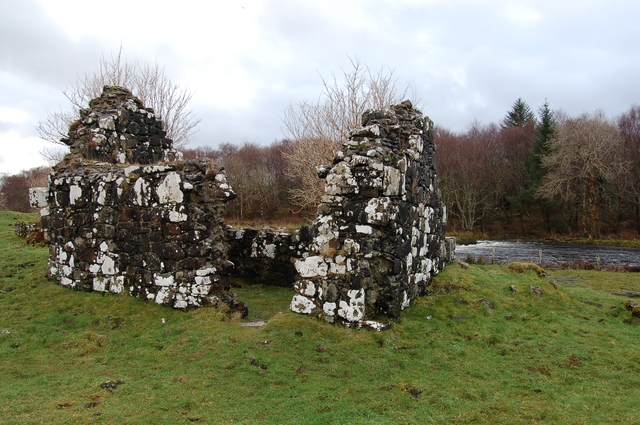
Ruined chapel on St Columba's Isle

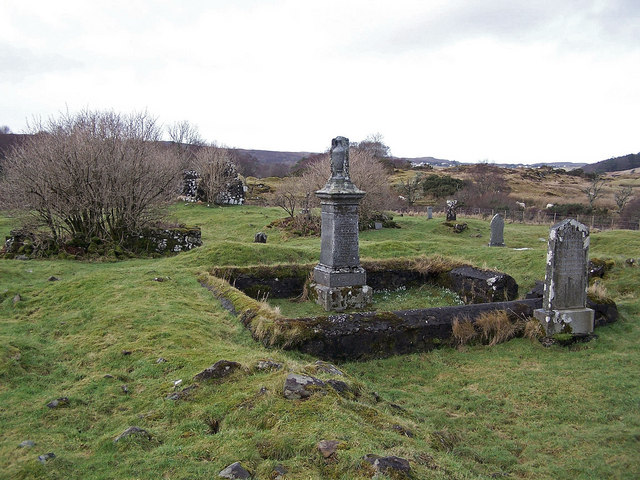
Graves on St Columba's Isle

Snizort Cathedral (Gaelic: Snìosort) was a small cathedral church located on an island (St Columba's Isle, Gaelic: Eilean Chaluim Chille) in the River Snizort, near the head of Loch Snizort on the Scottish island of Skye. Also referred to as Church of St Columba or Skeabost, it was founded under the authority of the Archbishop of Nidaros (Trondheim) in Norway. Amongst its more famous bishops was Wimund, who according to William of Newburgh became a seafaring warlord adventurer in the years after 1147.

== History ==
According to tradition, the cathedral was founded near a site where Columba had preached from a rock, which later became known as St. Columba's rock. The site may originally have been a pagan Pictish centre, but by the time of Columba's arrival may have converted to a Pictish Christian establishment. Over the early centuries of the 2nd millennium it gained importance as the Kilmuir monastery declined and by the 14th Century was referred to as the Metropolitan Church of the Isles, being the principal seat for the Bishops of the Isles until power was transferred to Iona Abbey. It was extant until at least 1501, but destroyed during the Scottish reformation, although remains are still visible.

== Burials ==
The St Columba's Isle graveyard on the island is managed by Highland Council. The island is the burial places for many Bishops who served the cathedral until the 1400's. Within the mortuary chapel on St Columba's Isle is the burial place of 28 MacNeacail chiefs. This small chapel is known as Aite Adhlaic Mhic Neacail, which, rendered loosely in English, is the MacNicol or Nicolson's Aisle.
