= Skeabost =

Coordinates: 57.45312°N 6.30589°W

Skeabost: Scottish Gaelic: Sgeitheabost
- Location within the Isle of Skye
- OS grid reference: NG418485
- Council area: Highland
- Country: Scotland
- Sovereign state: United Kingdom
- Post town: Portree
- Postcode district: IV51 9
- Police: Scotland
- Fire: Scottish
- Ambulance: Scottish

Skeabost (Scottish Gaelic: Sgeitheabost) is a township, at the head of the sea loch, Loch Snizort Beag in the southern end of the Trotternish peninsula on the island of Skye in the Scottish Highlands and is in the Scottish council area of Highland. It was the birthplace of Màiri Mhòr nan Òran.

The village of Carbost lies directly east along the A850 road.

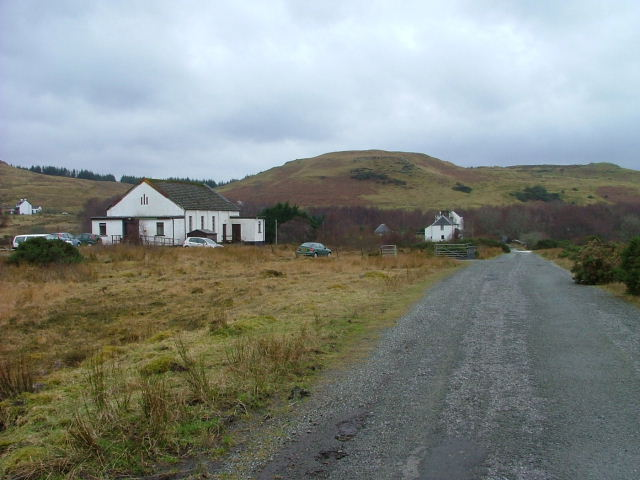
Skeabost

== See also ==
- Snizort Cathedral
- Snizort Free Church
