= Comhairle nan Eilean Siar elections =

Local government elections in Eilean Siar, Scotland

Comhairle nan Eilean Siar in Scotland holds elections every five years, previously holding them every four years from its creation as a single-tier authority in 1995 to 2007.

== Council elections ==
=== As an islands council ===
Year	Labour	Independent
1974	0	30
1978 (Note: New ward boundaries.)	0	30
1982	0	30
1986	0	30
1990	0	30
1994 (Note: New ward boundaries.) (Note: One seat was unfilled due to a lack of nominations.)	4	25

=== As a unitary authority ===
Year	SNP	Conservative	Labour	Independent
1999	4	0	5	22
2003	3	0	4	24
2007 (Note: Change to single transferable vote system and new ward boundaries.)	4	0	2	25
2012	7	0	3	21
2017	7	1	0	23
2022 (Note: New ward boundaries.)	6	1	0	22 (Note: Includes 2 independents elected at by-elections caused by an insufficient number of nominations on 30 June 2022.)

== Results maps ==
1999 results map

2003 results map

2007 results map

2012 results map

2017 results map

2022 results map

== By-elections ==
=== 2012-2017 ===
Sgir’ Uige Agus Ceann A Tuath Nan Loch By-Election 29 November 2012
Party	Candidate	FPv%	Count
Party	Candidate	FPv%	1
Independent	Angus MacDonald Morrison	73.5	745
SNP	John Norman MacDonald	19.2	195
Independent	Les Mac An Ultaigh	7.2	73
Independent gain from SNP			
Valid: 1,014 Spoilt: 14 Quota: 508 Turnout: 1,028

An Taobh Siar agus Nis By-Election 12 March 2015
Party	Candidate	FPv%	Count
Party	Candidate	FPv%	1
Independent	Alistair Maclennan	N/A	N/A
Independent hold			
Valid: N/A Spoilt: N/A Quota: N/A Turnout: N/A

Beinn Na Faoghla Agus Uibhist A Tuath By-Election 26 March 2015
Party	Candidate	FPv%	Count
Party	Candidate	FPv%	1
Independent	Andrew Walker	59.1	437
SNP	Roslyn Macpherson	40.9	302
Independent gain from Labour			
Valid: 739 Quota: 370

An Taobh Siar agus Nis By-Election 7 October 2015
Party	Candidate	FPv%	Count
Party	Candidate	FPv%	1
Independent	John Norman MacLeod	86.9	886
Independent	Richard Froggatt	7.4	75
Scottish Green	Gavin MacLeod Humphreys	5.8	59
Independent hold			
Valid: 1,020 Quota: 511

=== 2017-2022 ===
Na Hearadh agus Ceann a Deas nan Loch By-Election 8 October 2020
Party	Candidate	FPv%	Count
Party	Candidate	FPv%	1
Independent	Grant Fulton	74.9	536
Independent	Annie MacDonald	22.1	158
Independent	Kris O'Donnell	3.1	22
Independent hold			
Valid: 716 Spoilt: 5 Quota: 359 Turnout: 721

=== 2022-2027 ===
Barraigh agus Bhatarsaigh By-Election 30 June 2022
Party	Candidate	FPv%	Count	
Party	Candidate	FPv%	1	2
Independent	Iain A. MacNeil	49.3	189	197
Independent	Gerard Macdonald	47.3	181	182
Independent	Calum Macmillan	3.4	13	
Independent hold				
Electorate: 971 Valid: 383 Spoilt: 2 Quota: 193 Turnout: 385

Sgìr' Ùige agus Carlabhagh By-Election 30 June 2022
Party	Candidate	FPv%	Count					
Party	Candidate	FPv%	1	2	3	4	5	6
Independent	Norman M. MacDonald	35.4	222	222	230	238	256	278
Liberal Democrats	Jamie Dobson	20.4	128	128	129	142	159	220
Independent	Sophie B. Brown	18.0	113	113	114	119	148	
SNP	Laura F. Cameron-Lewis	15.3	96	97	97	112		
Scottish Green	Anne E. Edwards	9.1	57	57	57			
Independent	Donald J. MacLeod	1.8	11	11				
Independent	Iain J. MacKinnon	0.2	1					
Electorate: 1,329 Valid: 628 Spoilt: 6 Quota: 315 Turnout: 634

Na Hearadh By-Election 4 July 2024
Party	Candidate	FPv%	Count
Party	Candidate	FPv%	1
Independent	Kenny MacLeod	95.4	878
Scottish Family	Steven Welsh	4.6	53
Electorate: 1,484 Valid: 931 Spoilt: 11 Quota: 467 Turnout: 942
