= Sgìre an Rubha =

Electoral ward in the Outer Hebrides, Scotland

- Na h-Eileanan Siar
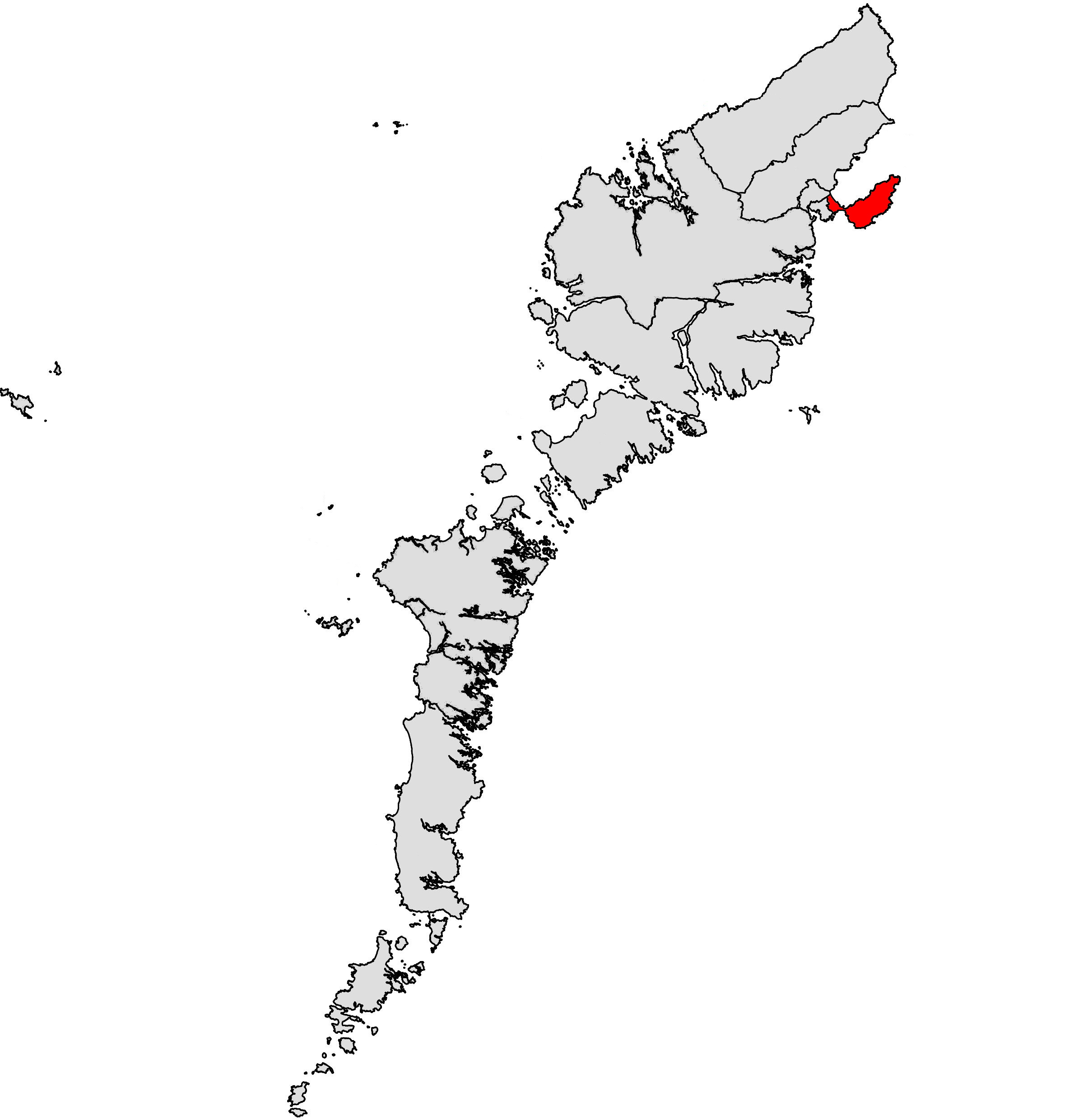
- Boundary of Sgìre an Rubha in Na h-Eileanan Siar from 2007–2022.
- Population: 2,158 (2021)
- Electorate: 1,905 (2017)
- Major settlements: Bayble; Garrabost
- Scottish Parliament constituency: Na h-Eileanan an Iar
- Scottish Parliament region: Highlands and Islands
- UK Parliament constituency: Na h-Eileanan an Iar

Current ward
- Created: 2007
- Number of councillors: 2
- Councillor: Norrie T. MacDonald (Independent)
- Councillor: Finlay M. Stewart (Independent)

Sgìre an Rubha (Scottish Gaelic for 'Point District') is one of the 11 wards of Comhairle nan Eilean Siar (Scottish Gaelic for 'Council of the Western Isles'). Created in 2007, the ward elects two councillors using the single transferable vote electoral system. Originally a three-member ward, the number of members elected in Sgìre an Rubha was reduced following a boundary review and it has elected two councillors since the 2022 Comhairle nan Eilean Siar election.

Independents have dominated elections in the Western Isles and every councillor elected in the area has had no party affiliation.

== Boundaries ==
The ward was created following the Fourth Statutory Reviews of Electoral Arrangements ahead of the 2007 Scottish local elections. As a result of the Local Governance (Scotland) Act 2004, local elections in Scotland would use the single transferable vote electoral system from 2007 onwards so Sgìre an Rubha was formed from an amalgamation of several previous first-past-the-post wards. It contained all of the former Knock and Bayble and Tiumpan wards as well as part of the former Braighe ward. The ward centres around the Eye Peninsula – also known as Point – in the northeast of the Isle of Lewis and includes the uninhabited Bayble Island. Proposals in the Fifth Statutory Reviews of Electoral Arrangements ahead of the 2017 Scottish local elections would have seen the ward's western boundary extended west to include the village of Sandwick and the ward renamed Sgìre an Rubha agus Sanndabhaig. However, these were not adopted by Scottish ministers as plans for the Islands (Scotland) Act 2018 would bring forward an interim review following the 2017 elections.

The Islands (Scotland) Act 2018 allowed for the creation of single- and dual-member wards to allow for better representation of island areas. The ward's western boundary was brought east to the causeway which joins the Eye Peninsula to the Isle of Lewis so that an area including Stornoway Airport and the village of Melbost were transferred to Steòrnabhagh a Deas. As a result, it was reduced from a three-member ward to a dual-member ward.

== Councillors ==
Election	Councillors		
2007	Donald J. MacSween (Independent)	Norman M. MacLeod (Independent)	Donald I. Nicholson (Independent)
2012	Zena Stewart (Independent)	Norman M. MacLeod (Independent)	Alasdair McLeod (Independent)
2017	Norrie MacDonald (Independent)	Finlay Stewart (Independent)	Alasdair McLeod (Independent)
2022	Norrie MacDonald (Independent)	Finlay Stewart (Independent)	

== Election results ==
=== 2022 election ===
Sgìre an Rubha – 2 seats
Party	Candidate	Votes	%
Independent	Norrie T. MacDonald (incumbent)	Unopposed	
Independent	Finlay M. Stewart (incumbent)	Unopposed	
Registered electors			

=== 2017 election ===
Sgìre an Rubha – 3 seats
Party	Candidate	FPv%	Count					
Party	Candidate	FPv%	1	2	3	4	5	6
Independent	Norrie MacDonald	32.0	354					
Independent	Alasdair MacLeod (incumbent)	29.7	329					
Independent	Finlay Stewart	13.6	151	169	191	213	267	338
Independent	Tony Robson	8.2	91	113	124	141	162	
Independent	John MacMillan	9.0	100	113	120	133		
Conservative	Don MacDonald	7.4	83	88	92			
Electorate: 1,905 Valid: 1,108 Spoilt: 26 Quota: 278 Turnout: 59.5%

=== 2012 Election ===
2012 Comhairle nan Eilean Siar election

Sgire an Rubha - 3 seats
Party	Candidate	FPv%	Count						
Party	Candidate	FPv%	1	2	3	4	5	6	7
Independent	Zena Stewart	17.52%	205	238	276	316			
Independent	Alasdair MacLeod	17.52%	205	219	242	291	297.8		
Independent	Donald John MacSween (incumbent)	15.13%	177	187	200	227	230.3	231.7	
Independent	Norman MacLeod (incumbent)	15.04%	176	186	202	252	256.2	257.6	349.0
Independent	Donald Nicholson (incumbent)	14.44%	169	183	197				
SNP	John Norman MacDonald	12.05%	141	149					
Independent	Iain Don MacIver	8.29%	97						
Electorate: 1,921 Valid: 1,170 Spoilt: 19 Quota: 293 Turnout: 1,189 (60.91)%

=== 2007 Election ===
2007 Comhairle nan Eilean Siar election

Comhairle nan Eilean Siar election, 2007: Sgire An Rubha
Party	Candidate	FPv%	%	Seat	Count
Independent	Donald John MacSween	497	38.4	1	1
Independent	Norman M MacLeod	450	34.8	2	1
Independent	Donald Iain Nicholson	245	18.9	3	2
Liberal Democrats	Stanley Bennie	101	7.8		
