= Steòrnabhagh a Tuath =

Electoral ward in the Outer Hebrides, Scotland

- Na h-Eileanan Siar
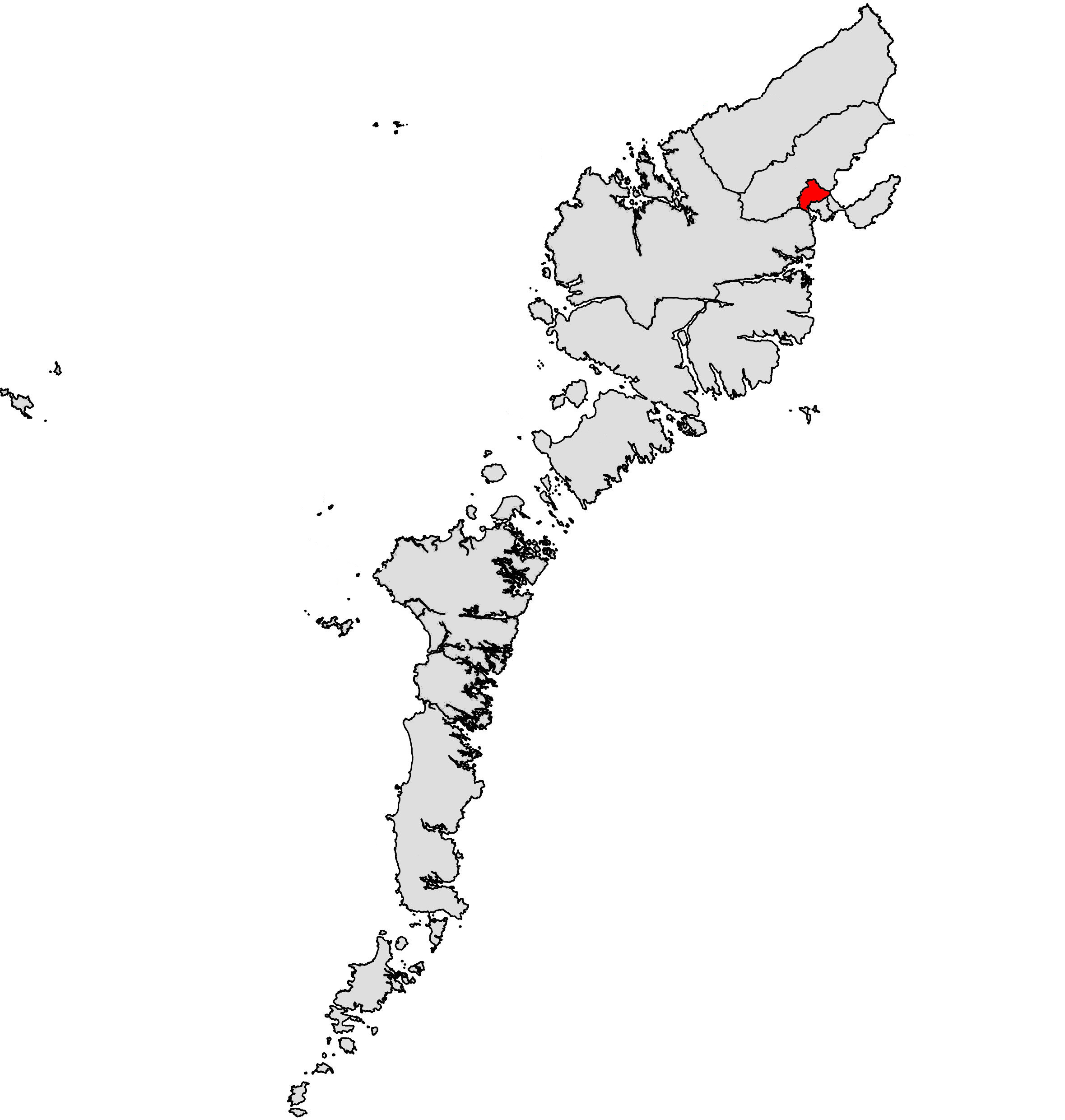
- Boundary of Steòrnabhagh a Tuath in Na h-Eileanan Siar from 2007–2022.
- Population: 3,748 (2021)
- Electorate: 3,097 (2022)
- Major settlements: Stornoway (part of)
- Scottish Parliament constituency: Na h-Eileanan an Iar
- Scottish Parliament region: Highlands and Islands
- UK Parliament constituency: Na h-Eileanan an Iar

Current ward
- Created: 2007
- Number of councillors: 4
- Councillor: Gordon Murray (SNP)
- Councillor: Duncan MacInnes (Independent)
- Councillor: Iain M. MacAulay (Independent)
- Councillor: Malcolm K. MacDonald (Independent)
- Created from: Blackwater; Braighe; Castle; Coulregrein; Goathill; Laxdale; Manor Park; Plasterfield

Steòrnabhagh a Tuath (Scottish Gaelic for 'Stornoway North') is one of the 11 wards of Comhairle nan Eilean Siar (Scottish Gaelic for 'Council of the Western Isles'). Created in 2007, the ward elects four councillors using the single transferable vote electoral system and covers an area with a population of 3,748 people.

Independents have dominated elections in the Western Isles and the majority of councillors elected in the area have had no party affiliation. However, since 2012, the Scottish National Party (SNP) have held one of the seats.

== Boundaries ==
The ward was created following the Fourth Statutory Reviews of Electoral Arrangements ahead of the 2007 Scottish local elections. As a result of the Local Governance (Scotland) Act 2004, local elections in Scotland would use the single transferable vote electoral system from 2007 onwards so Steòrnabhagh a Tuath was formed from an amalgamation of several previous first-past-the-post wards. It contained all of the former Coulregrein and Manor Park wards, the majority of the former Castle ward as well as part of the former Blackwater, Braighe, Goathill, Laxdale and Plasterfield wards. The ward centres around the northern and eastern parts of Stornoway on the Isle of Lewis and includes the village of Laxdale. Proposals in the Fifth Statutory Reviews of Electoral Arrangements ahead of the 2017 Scottish local elections would have reduced the ward's size in area and population resulting in the ward becoming a three-member ward. However, these were not adopted by Scottish ministers as plans for the Islands (Scotland) Act 2018 would bring forward an interim review following the 2017 elections.

The Islands (Scotland) Act 2018 allowed for the creation of single- and dual-member wards to allow for better representation of island areas. The ward was largely unaffected by the review but the ward's southern boundary was extended south to include the Arnish peninsula. It remained a four-member ward.

== Councillors ==
Election	Councillors			
2007	Murdo MacLeod (Independent)	Iain MacKenzie (Independent)	Roddie MacKay (Independent)	Neil Campbell (Independent)
2012	Gordon Murray (SNP)	Iain MacKenzie (Independent)	Roddie MacKay (Independent)	Iain MacLean MacAulay (Independent)
2017	Gordon Murray (SNP)	Neil MacKay (Independent)	Roddie MacKay (Independent)	Iain MacLean MacAulay (Independent)
2022	Gordon Murray (SNP)	Duncan MacInnes (Independent)	Malcolm Kenneth MacDonald (Independent)	Iain MacLean MacAulay (Independent)

== Election results ==
=== 2022 election ===
Steòrnabhagh a Tuath – 4 seats
Party	Candidate	FPv%	Count								
Party	Candidate	FPv%	1	2	3	4	5	6	7	8	9
SNP	Gordon Murray (incumbent)	23.3	315								
Independent	Duncan MacInnes	20.0	271								
Independent	Iain M. MacAulay (incumbent)	17.9	242	252	256	259	272				
Independent	Malcolm K. MacDonald	14.8	201	210	213	215	226	227	243	265	328
Independent	Calum B. MacKay	9.9	134	137	139	141	147	148	162	179	
Independent	Tracy Dinner	4.2	57	61	61	71	74	74	80		
Independent	Malcolm I. McTaggart	4.1	55	57	60	63	65	65			
Independent	Willie MacRae	3.3	44	46	46	49					
Independent	Maxi MacNeill	1.7	23	25	25						
Independent	John M. MacMillan	0.9	12	13							
Electorate: 3,097 Valid: 1,354 Spoilt: 25 Quota: 271 Turnout: 44.5%

=== 2017 election ===
Steòrnabhagh a Tuath – 4 seats
Party	Candidate	FPv%	Count				
Party	Candidate	FPv%	1	2	3	4	5
SNP	Gordon Murray (incumbent)	34.4	486				
Independent	Roddie MacKay (incumbent)	28.2	398				
Independent	Iain MacAulay (incumbent)	17.6	249	321			
Independent	Neil MacKay	10.3	145	190	251	269	357
Independent	Lesley McKenzie	9.5	134	163	176	183	
Electorate: 2,993 Valid: 1,412 Spoilt: 28 Quota: 283 Turnout: 48.1%

=== 2012 Election ===
2012 Comhairle nan Eilean Siar election

Steòrnabhagh a Tuath - 4 seats
Party	Candidate	FPv%	Count								
Party	Candidate	FPv%	1	2	3	4	5	6	7	8	9
Independent	Iain MacKenzie (incumbent)	20.68%	299								
Independent	Roddie MacKay (incumbent)	18.12%	262	264.1	272.1	294.1					
SNP	Mohammed Ahmed	12.17%	176	176.4	179.5	182.5	182.8	194.9	207.1	218.2	
SNP	Gordon Murray	12.03%	174	174.7	180.7	192.7	193.2	208.4	228.7	251.1	358.4
Independent	Murdo Murray	8.30%	120	121.8	123.8	128.4	129.4	142.6	160.9		
Independent	Iain MacLean MacAulay	7.12%	103	103.5	109.6	117.7	118.4	145.7	177.3	221.9	249.0
Independent	David Morrison	6.36%	92	93.1	97.1	104.1	104.8				
Independent	Neil Campbell (incumbent)	6.29%	91	91.5	92.5						
Independent	Jackie MacKay (incumbent)	6.15%	89	89.8	95.8	108.1	108.8	123.2			
Labour	Kevin Paterson	2.77%	40	40.2							
Electorate: 2,986 Valid: 1,446 Spoilt: 25 Quota: 290 Turnout: 1,471 (48.42)%

=== 2007 Election ===
2007 Comhairle nan Eilean Siar election

Comhairle nan Eilean Siar election, 2007: Steòrnabhagh a Tuath
Party	Candidate	FPv%	%	Seat	Count
Independent	Murdo MacLeod	920	50.3	1	1
Independent	Roddie MacKay	305	16.7	2	2
Independent	Iain MacKenzie	212	11.6	3	3
Independent	Neil Campbell	168	9.2	4	7
Liberal Democrats	John Chisholm Cole	108	5.9		
Independent	Angus MacMillan	95	5.2		
Independent	Colin Scott	20	1.1		
