= Loch a Tuath (ward) =

Electoral ward in the Outer Hebrides, Scotland

- Na h-Eileanan Siar
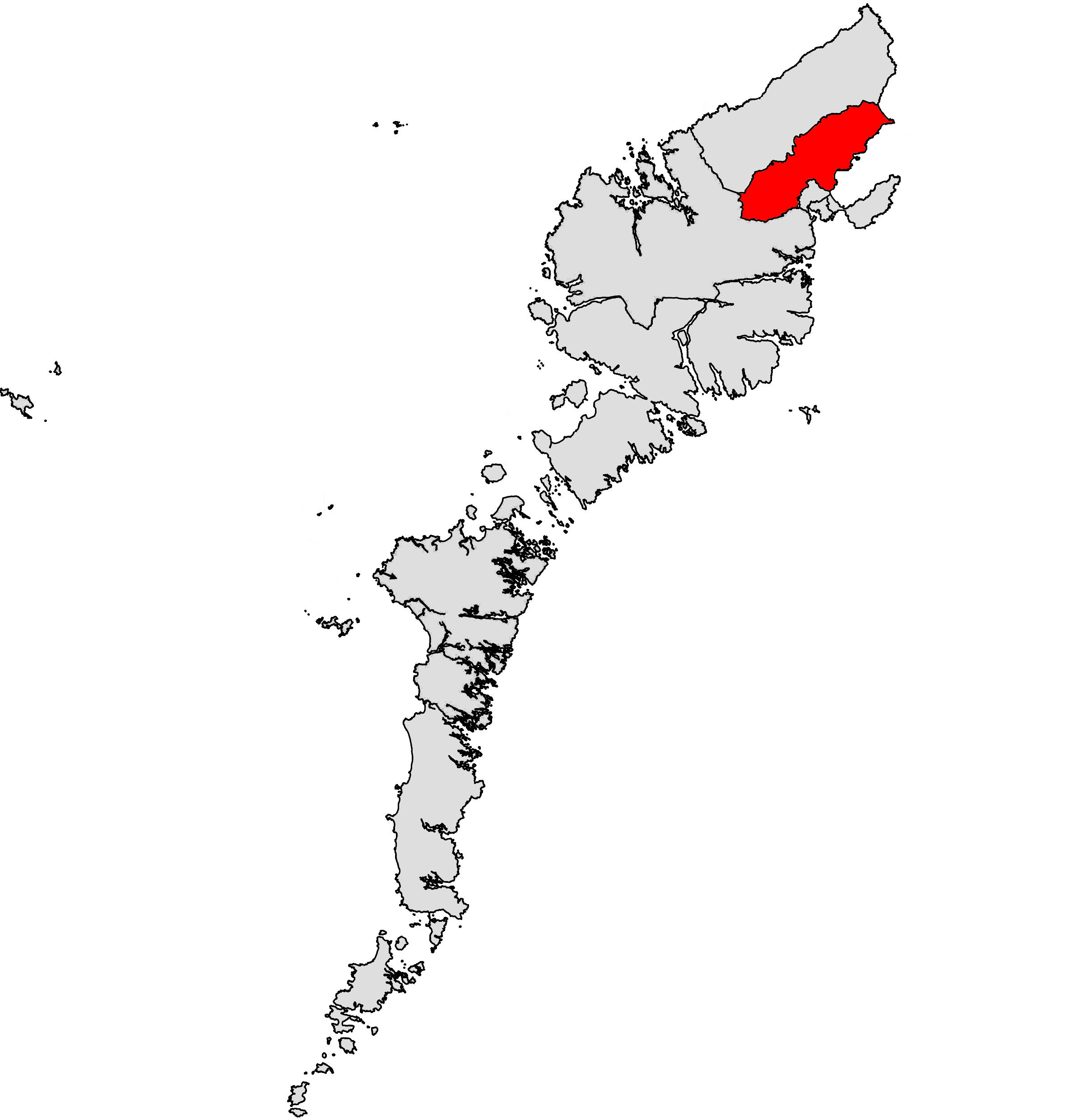
- Boundary of Loch a Tuath in Na h-Eileanan Siar from 2007–2022.
- Population: 2,654 (2021)
- Electorate: 2,216 (2022)
- Major settlements: Coll; North Tolsta
- Scottish Parliament constituency: Na h-Eileanan an Iar
- Scottish Parliament region: Highlands and Islands
- UK Parliament constituency: Na h-Eileanan an Iar

Current ward
- Created: 2007
- Number of councillors: 3
- Councillor: Donald F. Crichton (Independent)
- Councillor: Calum MacLean (Independent)
- Councillor: John A. MacIver (SNP)
- Created from: Barvas and Arnol; Blackwater; Braighe; Carloway; Coll; Gress; Laxdale

Loch a Tuath (Scottish Gaelic for 'Broad Bay', lit. 'North Loch'') is one of the 11 wards of Comhairle nan Eilean Siar (Scottish Gaelic for 'Council of the Western Isles'). Created in 2007, the ward elects three councillors using the single transferable vote electoral system and covers an area with a population of 2,654 people.

Independents have dominated elections in the Western Isles and the majority of councillors elected in the area have had no party affiliation. However, since 2012, the Scottish National Party (SNP) have held one of the seats.

== Boundaries ==
The ward was created following the Fourth Statutory Reviews of Electoral Arrangements ahead of the 2007 Scottish local elections. As a result of the Local Governance (Scotland) Act 2004, local elections in Scotland would use the single transferable vote electoral system from 2007 onwards so Loch a Tuath was formed from an amalgamation of several previous first-past-the-post wards. It contained all of the former Coll ward, the majority of the former Blackwater, Gress and Laxdale wards as well as part of the former Barvas and Arnol, Braighe and Carloway wards. The ward centres around the towns of Coll and North Tolsta in the northeast of the Isle of Lewis in the Outer Hebrides. Proposals in the Fifth Statutory Reviews of Electoral Arrangements ahead of the 2017 Scottish local elections would have maintained the ward's original boundaries. However, these were not adopted by Scottish ministers as plans for the Islands (Scotland) Act 2018 would bring forward an interim review following the 2017 elections.

The Islands (Scotland) Act 2018 allowed for the creation of single- and dual-member wards to allow for better representation of island areas. The boundaries and number of members representing Loch a Tuath were unaffected by the 2019 Reviews of Electoral Arrangements – instigated as a result of the act.

== Councillors ==
Election	Councillors		
2007	John A. MacIver (Independent/ SNP)	Kenneth MacIver (Independent)	Catriona Stewart (Independent)
2012	John A. MacIver (Independent/ SNP)	Donald Finlayson Crichton (Independent)	Catriona Stewart (Independent)
2017	John A. MacIver (Independent/ SNP)	Donald Finlayson Crichton (Independent)	Callum McLean (Independent)
2022	John A. MacIver (Independent/ SNP)	Donald Finlayson Crichton (Independent)	Callum McLean (Independent)

== Election results ==
=== 2022 election ===
Loch a Tuath – 3 seats
Party	Candidate	FPv%	Count	
Party	Candidate	FPv%	1	2
Independent	Donald F. Crichton (incumbent)	41.1	461	
Independent	Calum MacLean (incumbent)	22.2	249	330
SNP	John A. MacIver (incumbent)	21.9	246	281
Independent	Catriona Murray	11.2	126	168
Independent	Hazel G. Mansfield	3.5	39	46
Electorate: 2,216 Valid: 1,121 Spoilt: 27 Quota: 281 Turnout: 51.8%

=== 2017 election ===
Loch a Tuath – 3 seats
Party	Candidate	FPv%	Count				
Party	Candidate	FPv%	1	2	3	4	5
Independent	Donald Crichton (incumbent)	46.0	590				
Independent	Calum MacLean	17.9	230	344			
SNP	John A. MacIver (incumbent)	17.9	230	271	276	298	335
Independent	Iain MacIver	6.1	78	115	119	137	170
Independent	Ruaraidh Ferguson	6.2	80	110	113	132	
Independent	Allan MacLachlan	5.8	74	98	104		
Electorate: 2,255 Valid: 1,282 Spoilt: 35 Quota: 321 Turnout: 58.4%

=== 2012 Election ===
2012 Comhairle nan Eilean Siar election

Loch a Tuath - 3 seats
Party	Candidate	FPv%	Count			
Party	Candidate	FPv%	1	2	3	4
Independent	Donald Finlayson Crichton	28.0%	331			
SNP	John A. MacIver (incumbent)	24.53%	290	298.4		
Independent	Catriona Stewart (incumbent)	23.88%	273	282.5	283.1	333.1
Independent	Kenneth MacIver (incumbent)	14.47%	171	177.9	178.5	201.8
Independent	Alasdair Nicholson	9.9%	117	122.1	122.7	
Electorate: 2,166 Valid: 1,182 Spoilt: 17 Quota: 296 Turnout: 1,199 (54.57%)

=== 2007 Election ===
2007 Comhairle nan Eilean Siar election

Comhairle nan Eilean Siar election, 2007: Loch a Tuath
Party	Candidate	FPv%	%	Seat	Count
Independent	Catriona Stewart	486	36.0	1	1
Independent	Kenneth MacIver	249	18.4	2	3
SNP	Iain Murdo MacDonald	235	17.4		
Independent	John A. MacIver†	233	17.3	3	5
Independent	Alasdair Nicholson	147	10.9		
