= An Taobh Siar agus Nis =

Electoral ward in the Outer Hebrides, Scotland

- Na h-Eileanan Siar
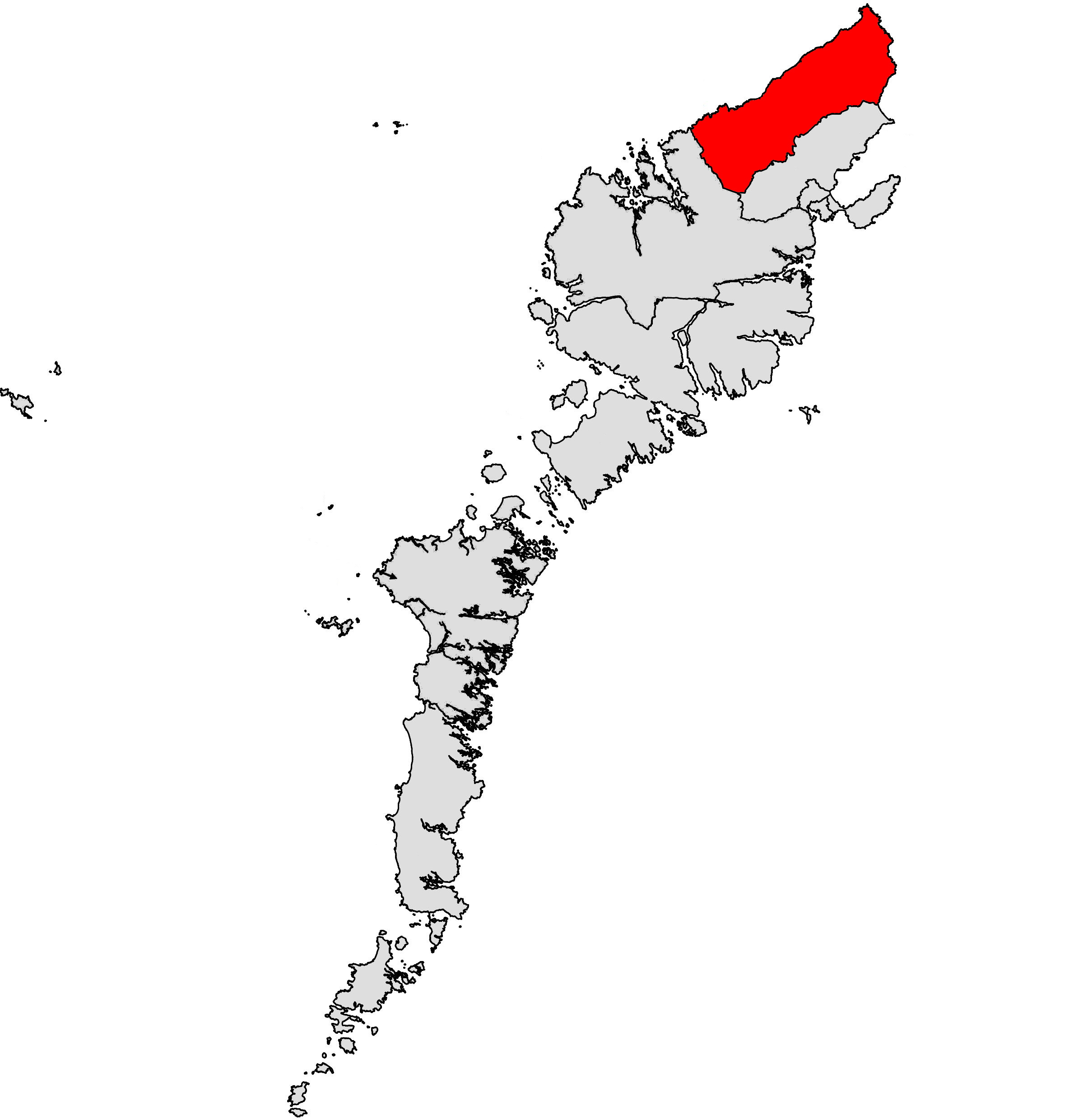
- Boundary of An Taobh Siar agus Nis in Na h-Eileanan Siar from 2007–2022.
- Population: 2,668 (2021)
- Electorate: 2,552 (2022)
- Major settlements: Barvas; Port of Ness
- Scottish Parliament constituency: Na h-Eileanan an Iar
- Scottish Parliament region: Highlands and Islands
- UK Parliament constituency: Na h-Eileanan an Iar

Current ward
- Created: 2007
- Number of councillors: 3
- Councillor: John N. MacLeod (Independent)
- Councillor: Kenneth MacLeod (SNP)
- Councillor: Donald MacSween (Independent)
- Created from: Barvas and Arnol; Carloway; Dell; Gress; Laxdale; Port of Ness; Shawbost

An Taobh Siar agus Nis (Scottish Gaelic for 'West Side and Ness') is one of the 11 wards of Comhairle nan Eilean Siar (Scottish Gaelic for 'Council of the Western Isles'). Created in 2007, the ward elects three councillors using the single transferable vote electoral system. Originally a four-member ward, the number of members elected in An Taobh Siar agus Nis was reduced following a boundary review and it has elected three councillors since the 2022 Comhairle nan Eilean Siar election.

Independents have dominated elections in the Western Isles and the majority of councillors elected in the area have had no party affiliation. However, since 2012, the Scottish National Party (SNP) have held one of the seats.

== Boundaries ==
The ward was created following the Fourth Statutory Reviews of Electoral Arrangements ahead of the 2007 Scottish local elections. As a result of the Local Governance (Scotland) Act 2004, local elections in Scotland would use the single transferable vote electoral system from 2007 onwards so An Taobh Siar agus Nis was formed from an amalgamation of several previous first-past-the-post wards. It contained all of the former Dell and Port of Ness wards, the majority of the former Barvas and Arnol and Shawbost wards as well as part of the former Carloway, Gress and Laxdale wards. The ward centres around the towns of Barvas and Port of Ness in the northwest of the Isle of Lewis in the Outer Hebrides. It includes the remote and uninhabited Isle of Rona in the north Atlantic Ocean – the northernmost part of the council area. Proposals in the Fifth Statutory Reviews of Electoral Arrangements ahead of the 2017 Scottish local elections would have extended the ward south to include Carloway. However, these were not adopted by Scottish ministers as plans for the Islands (Scotland) Act 2018 would bring forward an interim review following the 2017 elections.

The Islands (Scotland) Act 2018 allowed for the creation of single- and dual-member wards to allow for better representation of island areas. The boundaries for An Taobh Siar agus Nis were unaffected by the 2019 Reviews of Electoral Arrangements – instigated as a result of the act. However, the ward was reduced from a four-member ward to a three-member ward to improve electoral parity.

== Councillors ==
Year	Councillors			
2007	Agnes Rennie (Independent)	John MacKay (Independent)	Kenneth M. Murray (Independent)	Iain Morrison (Independent)
2012	Kenneth MacLeod (SNP)	John MacKay (Independent)	Kenneth M. Murray (Independent)	Iain Morrison (Independent)
March 2015	Kenneth MacLeod (SNP)	John MacKay (Independent)	Alistair MacLennan (Independent)	Iain Morrison (Independent)
October 2015	Kenneth MacLeod (SNP)	John MacKay (Independent)	Alistair MacLennan (Independent)	John N. McLeod (Independent)
2017	Kenneth MacLeod (SNP)	John MacKay (Independent)	Kenny J. MacLeod (Independent)	John N. McLeod (Independent)
2022	Kenneth MacLeod (SNP)	Donald McSween (Independent)	Kenny J. MacLeod (Independent)	

== Election results ==
=== 2022 election ===
An Taobh Siar agus Nis – 3 seats
Party	Candidate	FPv%	Count					
Party	Candidate	FPv%	1	2	3	4	5	6
Independent	John N. MacLeod (incumbent)	25.0	346	356				
SNP	Kenny MacLeod (incumbent)	21.8	302	365				
Independent	Donald MacSween	19.6	271	282	288	290	339	479
Independent	Dorothy Morrison	16.8	233	242	248	250	283	
Independent	Donald J. MacLeod	9.5	131	133	135	138		
SNP	Finlay J. MacLeod	7.4	102					
Electorate: 2,552 Valid: 1,414 Spoilt: 29 Quota: 347 Turnout: 55.4%

=== 2017 election ===
An Taobh Siar agus Nis – 4 seats
Party	Candidate	FPv%	Count					
Party	Candidate	FPv%	1	2	3	4	5	6
Independent	John N. MacLeod (incumbent)	23.7	339					
SNP	Kenneth MacLeod (incumbent)	19.4	277	286				
Independent	Kenny J. MacLeod	16.7	239	260	261	310		
Independent	John MacKay (incumbent)	15.4	220	224	224	254	261	339
Independent	Alistair MacLennan (incumbent)	13.5	193	200	201	238	247	
Independent	Malcolm McTaggart	11.3	161	164	164			
Electorate: 2,541 Valid: 1,429 Spoilt: 35 Quota: 286 Turnout: 57.6%

=== 2015 By-election ===
An Taobh Siar agus Nis By-election (7 October 2015) – 1 Seat
Party	Candidate	FPv%	Count
Party	Candidate	FPv%	1
Independent	John Norman MacLeod	86.9%	886
Independent	Richard Froggatt	7.4%	75
Green	Gavin MacLeod Humphreys	5.8%	59
Valid: 1,020 Quota: 511 Turnout: (39.8%)

=== 2012 Election ===
2012 Comhairle nan Eilean Siar election

An Taobh Siar agus Nis - 4 seats
Party	Candidate	FPv%	Count	
Party	Candidate	FPv%	1	2
Independent	Iain Morrison (incumbent)††††	24.18%	354	
Independent	John MacKay (incumbent)	21.17%	310	
SNP	Kenneth MacLeod	20.36%	298	
Independent	Kenneth MacLeod Murray (incumbent) ††	19.74%	289	316.4
Independent	Alastair MacLennan	8.13%	119	128.3
Independent	Alastair Dunlop	6.42%	94	103.3
Electorate: 2,599 Valid: 1,464 Spoilt: 21 Quota: 293 Turnout: 1,485 (56.34%)

=== 2007 Election ===
2007 Comhairle nan Eilean Siar election

Comhairle nan Eilean Siar election, 2007: An Taobh Siar agus Nis
Party	Candidate	FPv%	%	Seat	Count
Independent	Iain Morrison	463	25.9	1	1
Independent	John MacKay	335	18.7	2	3
Independent	Kenneth MacLeod Murray	313	17.5	3	5
Independent	Annie MacSween	277	15.5		
Independent	Agnes Rennie	267	14.9	4	7
Independent	Iain MacLeod	118	6.6		
Independent	Malcolm McTaggart	14	0.8		
