= Steòrnabhagh a Deas =

Electoral ward in the Outer Hebrides, Scotland

- Na h-Eileanan Siar
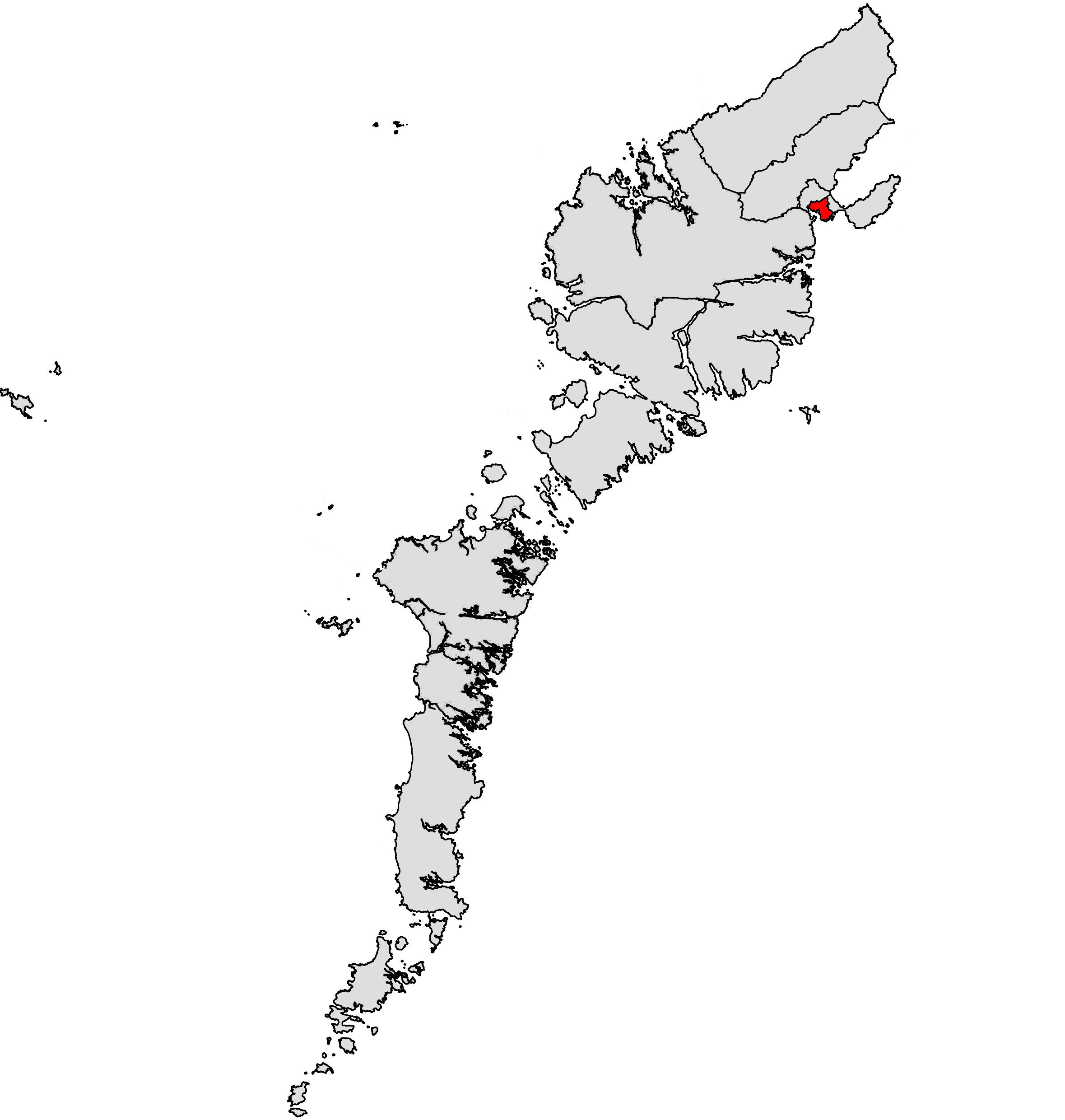
- Boundary of Steòrnabhagh a Deas in Na h-Eileanan Siar from 2007–2022.
- Population: 4,013 (2021)
- Electorate: 3,105 (2022)
- Major settlements: Stornoway (part of)
- Scottish Parliament constituency: Na h-Eileanan an Iar
- Scottish Parliament region: Highlands and Islands
- UK Parliament constituency: Na h-Eileanan an Iar

Current ward
- Created: 2007
- Number of councillors: 4
- Councillor: George Murray (Independent)
- Councillor: Rae MacKenzie (SNP)
- Councillor: Angus McCormack (Independent)
- Councillor: Frances Murray (SNP)
- Created from: Bayhead; Braighe; Castle; Goathill; Newton; Plasterfield

Steòrnabhagh a Deas (Scottish Gaelic for 'Stornoway South') is one of the 11 wards of Comhairle nan Eilean Siar (Scottish Gaelic for 'Council of the Western Isles'). Created in 2007, the ward elects four councillors using the single transferable vote electoral system and covers an area with a population of 4,013 people.

Independents have dominated elections in the Western Isles and the majority of councillors elected in the area have had no party affiliation. However, since 2012, the Scottish National Party (SNP) have held at least one of the seats.

== Boundaries ==
The ward was created following the Fourth Statutory Reviews of Electoral Arrangements ahead of the 2007 Scottish local elections. As a result of the Local Governance (Scotland) Act 2004, local elections in Scotland would use the single transferable vote electoral system from 2007 onwards so Steòrnabhagh a Deas was formed from an amalgamation of several previous first-past-the-post wards. It contained all of the former Bayhead and Newton wards, the majority of the former Goathill, Plasterfield wards as well as part of the former Braighe and Castle wards. The ward centres around the southern and western parts of Stornoway on the Isle of Lewis and includes the village of Sandwick. Proposals in the Fifth Statutory Reviews of Electoral Arrangements ahead of the 2017 Scottish local elections would have reduced the ward's size in area and population resulting in the ward becoming a three-member ward. However, these were not adopted by Scottish ministers as plans for the Islands (Scotland) Act 2018 would bring forward an interim review following the 2017 elections.

The Islands (Scotland) Act 2018 allowed for the creation of single- and dual-member wards to allow for better representation of island areas. The ward's eastern boundary was extended east to the causeway which joins the Eye Peninsula to the Isle of Lewis so that an area including Stornoway Airport and the village of Melbost were added. It remained a four-member ward.

== Councillors ==
Election	Councillors			
2007	Charlie Nicolson (Independent)	Angus McCormack (Independent)	Keith Dodson (Independent)	Angus Campbell (Independent)
2012	Charlie Nicolson (Independent)	Angus McCormack (Independent)	Rae McKenzie (SNP)	Angus Campbell (Independent)
2017	Charlie Nicolson (Independent)	Angus McCormack (Independent)	Rae McKenzie (SNP)	Keith Dodson (Independent)
2022	George Murray (Independent)	Angus McCormack (Independent)	Rae McKenzie (SNP)	Frances Murray (SNP)

== Election results ==
=== 2022 election ===
Steòrnabhagh a Deas – 4 seats
Party	Candidate	FPv%	Count						
Party	Candidate	FPv%	1	2	3	4	5	6	7
Independent	George Murray	25.4	367						
SNP	Rae MacKenzie (incumbent)	19.9	287	296					
Independent	Angus McCormack (incumbent)	19.6	283	300					
SNP	Frances Murray	14.0	203	213	215	217	231	246	301
Independent	Archie MacDonald	7.7	111	120	122	122	158	206	
Independent	Callum I. MacMillan	7.0	101	113	115	116	144		
Independent	Frank S. Burns	6.5	94	102	104	104			
Electorate: 3,105 Valid: 1,446 Spoilt: 30 Quota: 290 Turnout: 47.5%

=== 2017 election ===
Steòrnabhagh a Deas – 4 seats
Party	Candidate	FPv%	Count							
Party	Candidate	FPv%	1	2	3	4	5	6	7	8
Independent	Charlie Nicolson (incumbent)	49.25	755							
SNP	Rae MacKenzie (incumbent)	16.3	250	345						
Independent	Angus McCormack (incumbent)	10.8	165	290	299	308				
Independent	Keith Dodson	10.2	156	207	214	215	215	229	276	331
Independent	Shonnie MacRitchie	5.0	77	161	165	170	171	190	196	
Independent	Caroline Brick	5.0	76	81	84	86	86	92		
Independent	Derek McPherson	3.1	47	63	66	68	68			
Independent	Campbell McKenzie	0.5	7	17	18					
Electorate: 2,984 Valid: 1,533 Spoilt: 43 Quota: 307 Turnout: 52.8%

=== 2012 Election ===
2012 Comhairle nan Eilean Siar election

Steòrnabhagh a Deas - 4 seats
Party	Candidate	FPv%	Count						
Party	Candidate	FPv%	1	2	3	4	5	6	7
Independent	Charlie Nicolson (incumbent)	45.67%	685						
Independent	Angus Campbell (incumbent)	13.73%	206	287.8	288.8	290.5	311.5		
Independent	Angus McCormack (incumbent)	12.6%	189	298.9	306.2				
Independent	Keith Dodson (incumbent)	11.4%	171	230.9	233.1	234.0	247.3	251.7	
SNP	Rae MacKenzie	9.67%	145	203.9	253.1	254.1	268.9	270.5	365.9
SNP	Bob Duncan	3.8%	57	63.7					
Independent	Uilleam Macleod	3.13%	47	66.1	67.1	67.5			
Electorate: 2,962 Valid: 1,500 Spoilt: 26 Quota: 301 Turnout: 1,526 (50.65)%

=== 2007 Election ===
2007 Comhairle nan Eilean Siar election

Comhairle nan Eilean Siar election, 2007: Steòrnabhagh a Deas
Party	Candidate	FPv%	%	Seat	Count
Independent	Charlie Nicolson	683	36.2	1	1
Independent	Angus McCormack	529	28.0	2	1
Independent	Keith Dodson	292	15.5	3	3
Independent	Angus Campbell	188	10.0	4	6
Independent	David Morrison	137	7.3		
Liberal Democrats	Jean Davis	60	3.2		
