= 2022 Comhairle nan Eilean Siar election =

Local election in Scotland

- 5 May 2022

All 29 seats to Comhairle nan Eilean Siar 15 seats needed for a majority
- Turnout: 50.7% (Note: Excludes uncontested wards.)
	First party	Second party	Third party
	Ind	SNP	Con
Leader	Roddie MacKay (stood down)	Gordon Murray	Ranald Fraser
Party	Independent	SNP	Conservative
Leader's seat	Steòrnabhagh a Tuath	Steòrnabhagh a Tuath	Sgìr' Ùige agus Carlabhagh
Last election	23 seats, 77.5%	7 seats, 19.2%	1 seat, 3.4%
Seats before	22	6	1
Seats won	20	6	1
Seat change	▼3	▼1	Steady
Popular vote	6,573	1,880	131
Percentage	74.2%	21.3%	1.5%
Swing	▼3.3%	▲2.1%	▼1.9%
Council Leader before election
Roddie MacKay
Independent
Council Leader after election
Paul Steele
Independent

Elections to Comhairle nan Eilean Siar (Scottish Gaelic for 'Council of the Western Isles') took place on 5 May 2022 on the same day as the 31 other Scottish local government elections. As with other Scottish council elections, it was held using the single transferable vote (STV) system – a form of proportional representation – in which multiple candidates are elected in each ward, and voters rank candidates in order of preference.

The election was the first to use the nine wards created under the Islands (Scotland) Act 2018 which allowed for single- and dual-member wards, with 29 councillors being elected.

As with previous elections in the area, independent councillors retained a large majority of the seats on the council and retained control of the administration. The election also saw the first two female councillors elected to the council since 2012.

== Background ==
=== Previous election ===
At the previous election in 2017, independent councillors retained control of the council after taking a large majority of seats (23 out of 31). The Scottish National Party (SNP) took seven seats, an increase of one, and the Conservatives won their first-ever representation on the council.

2017 Comhairle nan Eilean Siar election result
Party	Seats	Vote share
Independents	23	77.5%
SNP	7	19.2%
Conservatives	1	3.4%

=== Electoral system ===
Local elections in Scotland use the single transferable vote (STV) electoral system – a form of proportional representation – in which voters rank candidates in order of preference. The 2022 election was the first to use the 11 wards created under the Islands (Scotland) Act 2018, with 29 councillors being elected. Each ward elected either two, three or four members.

=== Composition ===
Since the previous election, there were two changes in the council's composition. SNP councillor Calum MacMillan defected to the Alba Party and independent councillor Roddy MacKay joined the Greens. A single by-election was held and resulted in an independent hold.

Party	2017 result	Dissolution
Independents	23	22
SNP	7	6
Conservative	1	1
Green	0	1
Alba	N/A	1

=== Retiring councillors ===
Ward	Party	Retiring councillor
Barraigh, Bhatarsaigh, Eirisgeigh agus Uibhist a Deas	SNP	Donald Manford
Sgir' Uige agus Ceann a Tuath nan Loch	Independent	Norman A. MacDonald
Sgìre an Rubha	Independent	Alasdair MacLeod
Steòrnabhagh a Deas	Independent	Keith Dodson
Steòrnabhagh a Tuath	Independent	Neil MacKay
Steòrnabhagh a Tuath	Independent	Roddie MacKay
An Taobh Siar agus Nis	Independent	John MacKay
An Taobh Siar agus Nis	Independent	Kenny J. MacLeod

=== Boundary changes ===
Following the implementation of the Islands (Scotland) Act 2018, a review of the boundaries was undertaken in North Ayrshire, Argyll and Bute, Highland, Orkney Islands, Shetland Islands and the Western Isles. The act allowed for single- or two-member wards to be created to allow for better representation of island communities. As a result, the number wards was increased from nine to 11 but the number of councillors was reduced from 31 to 29. The An Taobh Siar agus Nis ward was the only ward to remain with the same boundaries but the number of councillors was reduced from four to three. There were changes to the boundaries for the Loch a Tuath, Sgìre an Rubha, Steòrnabhagh a Tuath and Steòrnabhagh a Deas wards but the number of councillors remained the same for each except Sgìre an Rubha which was reduced to two seats. New dual-member wards were created for Barraigh agus Bhatarsaigh, Na Hearadh, Sgìr' Ùige agus Carlabhagh, Sgìre nan Loch and Uibhist a Tuath.

=== Candidates ===
The total number of candidates fell from 60 in 2017 to 50. The number of independent candidates (37) outstripped any individual party but fell by 11 from the previous election. The SNP stood nine candidates; the same as they had in 2017 and more than any other party. The Conservatives stood just two candidates, down from three in 2017. For the first time, the Greens (one) and the Alba Party (one) fielded candidates in a Comhairle nan Eilean Siar election. Following the result of the previous election which saw no women elected to the council, there was a drive to increase the number of women standing. In total, eight women stood across the 11 wards – an increase of one from 2017.

=== Controversy ===
After nominations closed on 30 March 2022, two wards – Barraigh agus Bhatarsaigh and Sgìr' Ùige agus Carlabhagh – received less candidates than seats available. Both are dual-member wards and only one person stood for election in each. As a result, both candidates – along with the two candidates who stood for election in the dual-member Sgìre an Rubha ward – were automatically elected without a poll being conducted. The lack of interest in standing for election was called a "threat to local democracy" by the Greens. Across Scotland, 18 councillors were automatically elected because the number of candidates was not enough to trigger an election. During the 2017 local elections in Scotland, just three council wards were uncontested, but votes were held in every ward in both 2007 and 2012 – the first elections to use multi-member wards and STV. By-elections were organised in Barraigh agus Bhatarsaigh and Sgìr' Ùige agus Carlabhagh to elect a second councillor. Public disinterest in standing for election to local councils has been linked to the "ridiculous" size of some local authorities and the low pay councillors receive for their work.

== Results ==
2022 Comhairle nan Eilean Siar election result
Party	Seats	Gains	Losses	Net gain/loss	Seats %	Votes %	Votes	+/−
Independent	20	8	11	▼3	69.0	74.2	6,573	▼3.3
SNP	6	1	2	▼1	20.7	21.3	1,891	▲2.1
Conservative	1	0	0	Steady	3.4	1.5	131	▼1.9
Green	0	0	0	Steady	0.0	2.0	176	New
Alba	0	0	0	Steady	0.0	1.0	92	New
Vacant	2	2	0	▲2	6.9	N/A	N/A	N/A
Total	29						8,863	

Notes:

- Votes are the sum of first preference votes across all council wards. The net gain/loss and percentage changes relate to the result of the previous Scottish local elections on 4 May 2017. This is because STV has an element of proportionality which is not present unless multiple seats are being elected. This may differ from other published sources showing gain/loss relative to seats held at the dissolution of Scotland's councils.
- Following boundary changes, the total number of seats was reduced from 31 to 29.

=== Ward summary ===
Results of the 2022 Comhairle nan Eilean Siar election by ward
Ward	%	Cllrs	%	Cllrs	%	Cllrs	%	Cllrs	Total Cllrs
Ward	Independents		SNP		Conservative		Others		Total Cllrs
Barraigh agus Bhatarsaigh	—N/a	1							1
Uibhist a Deas, Èirisgeigh agus Beinn na Faoghla	62.6	2	16.9	1			20.5	0	3
Uibhist a Tuath	80.2	2			19.8	0			2
Na Hearadh	81.9	2	18.1	0					2
Sgìre nan Loch	90.5	2	9.5	0					2
Sgìr' Ùige agus Carlabhagh					—N/a	1			1
An Taobh Siar agus Nis	70.8	2	29.2	1					3
Loch a Tuath	78.1	2	21.9	1					3
Steòrnabhagh a Tuath	76.7	3	23.3	1					4
Steòrnabhagh a Deas	66.1	2	33.9	2					4
Sgìre an Rubha	—N/a	2							2
Total	74.2	20	21.3	6	1.5	1	3.0	0	27

Notes

1. A: Only one candidate stood for election in the two-member Barraigh agus Bhatarsaigh and Sgìr' Ùige agus Carlabhagh wards. A by-election was held on 30 June 2022 to elect a second member (see below).
2. B: As a result of less candidates standing for election than seats to be filled in two wards, only 27 councillors were elected on 5 May 2022 instead of 29.

== Ward results ==
At the previous election, the Barraigh agus Bhatarsaigh; Uibhist a Deas, Èirisgeigh agus Beinn na Faoghla and Uibhist a Tuath wards were represented by two wards: Barraigh, Bhatarsaigh, Eirisgeigh agus Uibhist a Deas and Beinn Na Foghla agus Uibhist a Tuath. The two wards elected seven councillors in total including five independents and two SNP. The newly created wards elected five independents and one SNP councillor while one seat was left vacant due to a lack of candidates. This resulted in a loss of one seat for the SNP. In total, three of the sitting independent councillors retained their seats and two new councillors were elected. In 2017, Green candidate Roddy MacKay and Alba candidate Calum MacMillan were elected as independents.

Similarly, the Na Hearadh; Sgìre nan Loch and Sgìr' Ùige agus Carlabhagh wards were represented by two wards: Na Hearadh agus Ceann a Deas nan Loch and Sgir' Uige agus Ceann a Tuath nan Loch. The two wards elected six councillors in total including four independents, one SNP and one Conservative. The newly created wards elected four independents and one Conservative councillor while one seat was left vacant due to a lack of candidates. This resulted in a loss of one seat for the SNP. In total, three of the sitting independent councillors retained their seats and one new councillor was elected.

=== Barraigh agus Bhatarsaigh ===
Barraigh agus Bhatarsaigh – 2 seats
Party	Candidate	Votes	%
Independent	Kenneth J. MacLean	Unopposed	
Registered electors			
Independent win (new seat)			

=== Uibhist a Deas, Èirisgeigh agus Beinn na Faoghla ===
Uibhist a Deas, Èirisgeigh agus Beinn na Faoghla – 3 seats
Party	Candidate	FPv%	Count							
Party	Candidate	FPv%	1	2	3	4	5	6	7	8
Independent	Paul F. Steele (Note: Sitting councillor for Barraigh, Bhatarsaigh, Eiriosgaigh agus Uibhist a Deas.)	21.1	275	290	305	352				
SNP	Susan Thomson	16.9	221	230	243	262	266	332		
Independent	Iain M. MacLeod (Note: Sitting councillor for Beinn na Faoghla agus Uibhist a Tuath.)	13.6	177	188	205	250	255	302	303	384
Green	Roddy MacKay	13.5	176	182	186	197	201			
Independent	Donnie Steele	11.9	155	161	180	200	206	253	254	
Independent	Iain A. MacNeil	10.6	138	147	159					
Alba	Calum MacMillan	7.0	92	98						
Independent	Andrew V. Walker	5.5	72							
Electorate: 2,541 Valid: 1,306 Spoilt: 36 Quota: 327 Turnout: 52.8%

=== Uibhist a Tuath ===
Uibhist a Tuath – 2 seats
Party	Candidate	FPv%	Count
Party	Candidate	FPv%	1
Independent	Mustapha Hocine	41.8	276
Independent	Uisdean Robertson	38.4	254
Conservative	Kenny Barker	19.8	131
Electorate: 1,360 Valid: 661 Spoilt: 8 Quota: 221 Turnout: 49.2%

=== Na Hearadh ===
Na Hearadh – 2 seats
Party	Candidate	FPv%	Count	
Party	Candidate	FPv%	1	2
Independent	Grant Fulton (Note: Sitting councillor for Na Hearadh agus Ceann a Deas nan Loch.)	50.3	372	
Independent	Paul Finnegan	31.5	233	301
SNP	John G. Mitchell	18.1	134	171
Electorate: 1,553 Valid: 739 Spoilt: 22 Quota: 247 Turnout: 49.0%

=== Sgìre nan Loch ===
Sgìre nan Loch – 2 seats
Party	Candidate	FPv%	Count	
Party	Candidate	FPv%	1	2
Independent	Angus Morrison (Note: Sitting councillor for Sgir' Uige agus Ceann a Tuath nan Loch.)	49.9	425	
Independent	Robert MacKenzie	30.8	262	336
Independent	Annie MacDonald	9.8	83	109
SNP	Norman Smith	9.5	81	87
Electorate: 1,458 Valid: 851 Spoilt: 4 Quota: 284 Turnout: 58.6%

=== Sgìr' Ùige agus Carlabhagh ===
Sgìr' Ùige agus Carlabhagh – 2 seats
Party	Candidate	Votes	%
Conservative	Ranald Fraser	Unopposed	
Registered electors			
Conservative win (new seat)			

=== An Taobh Siar agus Nis ===
The SNP and independent councillor John N. MacLeod retained the seats they had won at the previous election, while independent candidate Donald MacSween gained a seat. Following boundary changes, the number of councillors elected was reduced from four to three. Former councillors John MacKay and Kenny J. MacLeod stood down before the election.

An Taobh Siar agus Nis – 3 seats
Party	Candidate	FPv%	Count					
Party	Candidate	FPv%	1	2	3	4	5	6
Independent	John N. MacLeod (incumbent)	25.0	346	356				
SNP	Kenny MacLeod (incumbent)	21.8	302	365				
Independent	Donald MacSween	19.6	271	282	288	290	339	479
Independent	Dorothy Morrison	16.8	233	242	248	250	283	
Independent	Donald J. MacLeod	9.5	131	133	135	138		
SNP	Finlay J. MacLeod	7.4	102					
Electorate: 2,552 Valid: 1,414 Spoilt: 29 Quota: 347 Turnout: 55.4%

=== Loch a Tuath ===
The SNP and independent councillors Donald F. Crichton and Calum MacLean retained the seats they had won at the previous election.

Loch a Tuath – 3 seats
Party	Candidate	FPv%	Count	
Party	Candidate	FPv%	1	2
Independent	Donald F. Crichton (incumbent)	41.1	461	
Independent	Calum MacLean (incumbent)	22.2	249	330
SNP	John A. MacIver (incumbent)	21.9	246	281
Independent	Catriona Murray	11.2	126	168
Independent	Hazel G. Mansfield	3.5	39	46
Electorate: 2,216 Valid: 1,121 Spoilt: 27 Quota: 281 Turnout: 51.8%

=== Steòrnabhagh a Tuath ===
The SNP and independent councillor Iain M. MacAulay retained the seats they had won at the previous election, while independent candidates Duncan MacInnes and Malcolm K. MacDonald gained a seat from former councillors Roddie MacKay and Neil MacKay who stood down at the election.

Steòrnabhagh a Tuath – 4 seats
Party	Candidate	FPv%	Count								
Party	Candidate	FPv%	1	2	3	4	5	6	7	8	9
SNP	Gordon Murray (incumbent)	23.3	315								
Independent	Duncan MacInnes	20.0	271								
Independent	Iain M. MacAulay (incumbent)	17.9	242	252	256	259	272				
Independent	Malcolm K. MacDonald	14.8	201	210	213	215	226	227	243	265	328
Independent	Calum B. MacKay	9.9	134	137	139	141	147	148	162	179	
Independent	Tracy Dinner	4.2	57	61	61	71	74	74	80		
Independent	Malcolm I. McTaggart	4.1	55	57	60	63	65	65			
Independent	Willie MacRae	3.3	44	46	46	49					
Independent	Maxi MacNeill	1.7	23	25	25						
Independent	John M. MacMillan	0.9	12	13							
Electorate: 3,097 Valid: 1,354 Spoilt: 25 Quota: 271 Turnout: 44.5%

=== Steòrnabhagh a Deas ===
The SNP and independent councillor Angus McCormack retained the seats they had won at the previous election, while the SNP and independent candidate George Murray gained a seat from former councillors Charlie Nicolson and Keith Dodson who stood down at the election.

Steòrnabhagh a Deas – 4 seats
Party	Candidate	FPv%	Count						
Party	Candidate	FPv%	1	2	3	4	5	6	7
Independent	George Murray	25.4	367						
SNP	Rae MacKenzie (incumbent)	19.9	287	296					
Independent	Angus McCormack (incumbent)	19.6	283	300					
SNP	Frances Murray	14.0	203	213	215	217	231	246	301
Independent	Archie MacDonald	7.7	111	120	122	122	158	206	
Independent	Callum I. MacMillan	7.0	101	113	115	116	144		
Independent	Frank S. Burns	6.5	94	102	104	104			
Electorate: 3,105 Valid: 1,446 Spoilt: 30 Quota: 290 Turnout: 47.5%

=== Sgìre an Rubha ===
Independent councillors Norrie T. MacDonald and Finlay M. Stewart retained the seats they had won at the previous election. Following boundary changes, the number of councillors elected was reduced from three to two. Former councillor Alasdair MacLeod stood down before the election.

Sgìre an Rubha – 2 seats
Party	Candidate	Votes	%
Independent	Norrie T. MacDonald (incumbent)	Unopposed	
Independent	Finlay M. Stewart (incumbent)	Unopposed	
Registered electors			

== Aftermath ==
For the first time in a decade, female councillors were elected to the council. SNP councillors Susan Thomson and Frances Murray became the first women to serve on the council since Catherine MacDonald was elected in 2012.

Three candidates – namely Cllr Kenneth MacLeod, Cllr Paul Steele and Cllr Norman MacDonald – put themselves forward for the position of council leader and, following the cut of a deck of cards, Cllr Steele was elected. Cllr MacLeod was elected as convener on the same basis and Cllr Duncan MacInnes was elected as the first depute leader of the council.

On 13 September 2024, Cllr Malcolm K. MacDonald, councillor for Steòrnabhagh a Tuath, announced that he had joined the Liberal Democrats becoming their first ever representative on the council.

=== June 2022 by-elections ===
By-elections were called shortly after the election in Barraigh agus Bhatarsaigh and Sgìr' Ùige agus Carlabhagh following the lack of nominations received for the wards at the full election of the council. The by-elections were held on 30 June 2022 and counted by hand the following day.

Barraigh agus Bhatarsaigh by-election (30 June 2022) – 1 seat
Party	Candidate	FPv%	Count	
Party	Candidate	FPv%	1	2
Independent	Iain A. MacNeil	49.3	189	197
Independent	Gerard Macdonald	47.3	181	182
Independent	Calum Macmillan	3.4	13	
Electorate: 971 Valid: 383 Spoilt: 2 Quota: 193 Turnout: 39.6%

Sgìr' Ùige agus Carlabhagh by-election (30 June 2022) – 1 seat
Party	Candidate	FPv%	Count					
Party	Candidate	FPv%	1	2	3	4	5	6
Independent	Norman M. MacDonald	35.4	222	222	230	238	256	278
Liberal Democrats	Jamie Dobson	20.4	128	128	129	142	159	220
Independent	Sophie B. Brown	18.0	113	113	114	119	148	
SNP	Laura F. Cameron-Lewis	15.3	96	97	97	112		
Green	Anne E. Edwards	9.1	57	57	57			
Independent	Donald J. MacLeod	1.8	11	11				
Independent	Iain J. MacKinnon	0.2	1					
Electorate: 1,329 Valid: 628 Spoilt: 6 Quota: 315 Turnout: 47.7%

=== Na Hearadh by-election ===
In May 2024, Na Hearadh councillor Grant Fulton resigned citing displeasure about the way the council was run. A by-election was held on 4 July 2024, the same day as the 2024 United Kingdom general election, and was won by independent candidate Kenny MacLeod.

Na Hearadh by-election (4 July 2024) – 1 seat
Party	Candidate	FPv%	Count
Party	Candidate	FPv%	1
Independent	Kenny MacLeod	95.4	878
Scottish Family	Steven Welsh	4.6	53
Electorate: 1,484 Valid: 931 Spoilt: 11 Quota: 467 Turnout: 62.7%
