= Sgìre nan Loch =

Electoral ward in the Outer Hebrides, Scotland

- Na h-Eileanan Siar
- Boundary of Sgìre nan Loch in .
- Population: 1,793 (2021)
- Electorate: 1,458 (2022)
- Major settlements: Crossbost; Leurbost
- Scottish Parliament constituency: Na h-Eileanan an Iar
- Scottish Parliament region: Highlands and Islands
- UK Parliament constituency: Na h-Eileanan an Iar

Current ward
- Created: 2022
- Number of councillors: 2
- Councillor: Angus Morrison (Independent)
- Councillor: Robert MacKenzie (Independent)
- Created from: Sgir' Uige agus Ceann a Tuath nan Loch; Na Hearadh agus Ceann a Deas nan Loch

Sgìre nan Loch (Scottish Gaelic for 'The Lochs') is one of the 11 wards of Comhairle nan Eilean Siar (Scottish Gaelic for 'Council of the Western Isles'). Created in 2022, the ward elects two councillors using the single transferable vote electoral system and covers an area with a population of 1,793 people.

== Boundaries ==
The ward was created following the 2019 Reviews of Electoral Arrangements which were instigated following the implementation of the Islands (Scotland) Act 2018. The act allowed for the creation of single- and dual-member wards to allow for better representation of island areas. Sgìre nan Loch was formed from two previous wards; the eastern parts of the former Sgir' Uige agus Ceann a Tuath nan Loch and Na Hearadh agus Ceann a Deas nan Loch wards. The ward takes in the southeastern part of the Isle of Lewis, north of the historical boundary with the Isle of Harris. It includes the parishes of North Lochs and South Lochs.

== Councillors ==
| Election | Councillors | |
|---|---|---|
| 2022 | Angus Morrison (Independent) | Robert MacKenzie (Independent) |

== Election results ==
=== 2022 election ===
Sgìre nan Loch – 2 seats
| Party | Candidate | FPv% | Count | |
| Party | Candidate | FPv% | 1 | 2 |
|---|---|---|---|---|
| Independent | Angus Morrison (Note: Sitting councillor for Sgir' Uige agus Ceann a Tuath nan Loch.) | 49.9 | 425 | |
| Independent | Robert MacKenzie | 30.8 | 262 | 336 |
| Independent | Annie MacDonald | 9.8 | 83 | 109 |
| SNP | Norman Smith | 9.5 | 81 | 87 |
Electorate: 1,458 Valid: 851 Spoilt: 4 Quota: 284 Turnout: 58.6%
