= Na Hearadh (ward) =

Electoral ward in the Outer Hebrides, Scotland

- Na h-Eileanan Siar
- Boundary of Na Hearadh in .
- Population: 1,795 (2021)
- Electorate: 1,360 (2022)
- Major settlements: Tarbert
- Scottish Parliament constituency: Na h-Eileanan an Iar
- Scottish Parliament region: Highlands and Islands
- UK Parliament constituency: Na h-Eileanan an Iar

Current ward
- Created: 2022
- Number of councillors: 2
- Councillor: Grant Fulton (Independent)
- Councillor: Paul Finnegan (Independent)
- Created from: Na Hearadh agus Ceann a Deas nan Loch

Na Hearadh (Scottish Gaelic for 'Harris') is one of the 11 wards of Comhairle nan Eilean Siar (Scottish Gaelic for 'Council of the Western Isles'). Created in 2022, the ward elects two councillors using the single transferable vote electoral system and covers an area with a population of 1,795 people.

== Boundaries ==
The ward was created following the 2019 Reviews of Electoral Arrangements which were instigated following the implementation of the Islands (Scotland) Act 2018. The act allowed for the creation of single- and dual-member wards to allow for better representation of island areas. Uibhist a Tuath was formed from the previous Na Hearadh agus Ceann a Deas nan Loch ward. The ward is centred around the Isle of Harris – the southern portion of the island of Lewis and Harris – in the Outer Hebrides as well as a number of uninhabited islands including Pabbay and Ensay in the Sound of Harris; Gasker, Scarp and Taransay in the Atlantic Ocean; and Scalpay in the Little Minch.

== Councillors ==
| Year | Councillors | |
|---|---|---|
| 2022 | Grant Fulton (Independent) | Paul Finnegan (Independent) |
| 2024 | Kenny MacLeod (Independent) | Paul Finnegan (Independent) |

== Election results ==
=== 2024 by-election ===
Na Hearadh by-election (4 July 2024) – 1 seat
| Party | Candidate | FPv% | Count |
| Party | Candidate | FPv% | 1 |
|---|---|---|---|
| Independent | Kenny MacLeod | 95.4 | 878 |
| Scottish Family | Steven Welsh | 4.6 | 53 |
Electorate: 1,484 Valid: 931 Spoilt: 11 Quota: 467 Turnout: 62.7%

=== 2022 election ===
Na Hearadh – 2 seats
| Party | Candidate | FPv% | Count | |
| Party | Candidate | FPv% | 1 | 2 |
|---|---|---|---|---|
| Independent | Grant Fulton (Note: Sitting councillor for Na Hearadh agus Ceann a Deas nan Loch.) | 50.3 | 372 | |
| Independent | Paul Finnegan | 31.5 | 233 | 301 |
| SNP | John G. Mitchell | 18.1 | 134 | 171 |
Electorate: 1,553 Valid: 739 Spoilt: 22 Quota: 247 Turnout: 49.0%
