= Uibhist a Deas, Èirisgeigh agus Beinn na Faoghla =

Electoral ward in the Outer Hebrides, Scotland

- Na h-Eileanan Siar
- Boundary of Uibhist a Deas, Èirisgeigh agus Beinn na Faoghla in Na h-Eileanan Siar.
- Population: 3,067 (2021)
- Electorate: 2,541 (2022)
- Major settlements: Balivanich; Lochboisdale
- Scottish Parliament constituency: Na h-Eileanan an Iar
- Scottish Parliament region: Highlands and Islands
- UK Parliament constituency: Na h-Eileanan an Iar

Current ward
- Created: 2022
- Number of councillors: 3
- Councillor: Paul F. Steele (Independent)
- Councillor: Susan Thomson (SNP)
- Councillor: Iain M. MacLeod (Independent)
- Created from: Barraigh, Bhatarsaigh, Eirisgeigh agus Uibhist a Deas; Beinn na Foghla agus Uibhist a Tuath

Uibhist a Deas, Èirisgeigh agus Beinn na Faoghla (Scottish Gaelic for 'South Uist, Eriskay and Benbecula') [ˈɯː.ɪʃtʲ ə tʲes̪ ˈeːrʲɪʃkʲej əkəs̪ ˈpeɲə ˈvɯː.əlˠə] is one of the 11 wards of Comhairle nan Eilean Siar (Scottish Gaelic for 'Council of the Western Isles'). Created in 2022, the ward elects three councillors using the single transferable vote electoral system and covers an area with a population of 3,067 people.

== Boundaries ==
The ward was created following the 2019 Reviews of Electoral Arrangements which were instigated following the implementation of the Islands (Scotland) Act 2018. The act allowed for the creation of single- and dual-member wards to allow for better representation of island areas. Uibhist a Deas, Èirisgeigh agus Beinn na Faoghla was formed from the two previous wards; the northern islands from Barraigh, Bhatarsaigh, Eirisgeigh agus Uibhist a Deas and the southern islands from Beinn na Foghla agus Uibhist a Tuath. The ward is centred around the islands of South Uist, Eriskay and Benbecula in the south of the Outer Hebrides and includes the uninhabited islands of Calvay and Lingay in the Sound of Barra as well as Eileanan Chearabhaigh.

== Councillors ==
Election	Councillors		
2022	Paul F. Steele (Independent)	Susan Thomson (SNP)	Iain M. MacLeod (Independent)

== Election results ==
=== 2022 election ===
Uibhist a Deas, Èirisgeigh agus Beinn na Faoghla – 3 seats
Party	Candidate	FPv%	Count							
Party	Candidate	FPv%	1	2	3	4	5	6	7	8
Independent	Paul F. Steele (Note: Sitting councillor for Barraigh, Bhatarsaigh, Eiriosgaigh agus Uibhist a Deas.)	21.1	275	290	305	352				
SNP	Susan Thomson	16.9	221	230	243	262	266	332		
Independent	Iain M. MacLeod (Note: Sitting councillor for Beinn na Faoghla agus Uibhist a Tuath.)	13.6	177	188	205	250	255	302	303	384
Green	Roddy MacKay	13.5	176	182	186	197	201			
Independent	Donnie Steele	11.9	155	161	180	200	206	253	254	
Independent	Iain A. MacNeil	10.6	138	147	159					
Alba	Calum MacMillan	7.0	92	98						
Independent	Andrew V. Walker	5.5	72							
Electorate: 2,541 Valid: 1,306 Spoilt: 36 Quota: 327 Turnout: 52.8%
