= 2017 Comhairle nan Eilean Siar election =

Comhairle nan Eilean Siar election

- 4 May 2017

All 31 seats to Comhairle nan Eilean Siar 16 seats needed for a majority
| | First party | Second party | Third party |
|---|---|---|---|
| | Ind | SNP | Con |
| Leader | Roddie MacKay | Donald Manford | Ranald Fraser |
| Party | Independent | SNP | Conservative |
| Leader's seat | Steòrnabhagh a Tuath | Barraigh, Bhatarsaigh, Eirisgeigh agus Uibhist a Deas | Sgìr' Ùige agus Carlabhagh |
| Last election | 25 seats, 71.6% | 7 seats, 23.8% | N/A |
| Seats before | 21 | 7 | 0 |
| Seats won | 23 | 7 | 1 |
| Seat change | ▼2 | Steady | ▲1 |
| Popular vote | 9,248 | 2,287 | 402 |
| Percentage | 77.5% | 19.2% | 3.4% |
| Swing | ▲5.9% | ▼4.7% | New |
Council Leader before election
Angus Campbell
Independent
Council Leader after election
Roddie MacKay
Independent

Elections to Comhairle nan Eilean Siar (Scottish Gaelic for 'Council of the Western Isles') were held on 4 May 2017, the same day as the 31 other Scottish local government elections. As with other Scottish council elections, it was held using single transferable vote (STV) – a form of proportional representation – in which multiple candidates are elected in each ward and voters rank candidates in order of preference.

As with previous elections in the area, independent councillors retained a large majority of the seats on the council and retained control of the administration. No women were elected for the first time in the council's history, resulting in it becoming Scotland's only local authority without any female representation.

== Election result ==
2017 Comhairle nan Eilean Siar election result
| Party | Seats | Gains | Losses | Net gain/loss | Seats % | Votes % | Votes | +/− |
|---|---|---|---|---|---|---|---|---|
| Independent | 23 | 2 | 0 | ▲2 | 74.2 | 77.5 | 9,248 | ▲5.9 |
| SNP | 7 | 1 | 1 | Steady | 22.6 | 19.2 | 2,287 | ▼4.7 |
| Conservative | 1 | 1 | 0 | ▲1 | 3.2 | 3.4 | 402 | New |
| Total | 31 | | | | | | 11,937 | |

Note: "Votes" are the first preference votes. The net gain/loss and percentage changes compare with the previous Scottish local elections on 3 May 2012. These figures may differ from other published sources showing gains/losses in comparison with the seats held at the dissolution of the council in 2012.

== Ward results ==
=== Barraigh, Bhatarsaigh, Eirisgeigh agus Uibhist a Deas ===
The SNP retained the seat they had won at the previous election and gained one seat while independent candidates Iain MacNeil and Paul Steele also gained a seat. Former independent councillors David Blaney, Donnie Steele and Labour who did not contest the election. In 2012, independent candidate Ronald MacKinnon was elected as a Labour candidate.

Barraigh, Bhatarsaigh, Eirisgeigh agus Uibhist a Deas – 4 seats
| Party | Candidate | FPv% | Count | | | | | | | |
| Party | Candidate | FPv% | 1 | 2 | 3 | 4 | 5 | 6 | 7 | 8 |
|---|---|---|---|---|---|---|---|---|---|---|
| SNP | Donald Manford (incumbent) | 38.3 | 531 | | | | | | | |
| SNP | Calum MacMillan | 10.0 | 138 | 278 | | | | | | |
| Independent | Iain MacNeil | 15.7 | 217 | 240 | 240 | 246 | 264 | 290 | | |
| Independent | Paul Steele | 11.6 | 161 | 170 | 170 | 172 | 192 | 253 | 258 | 324 |
| Independent | David Blaney (incumbent) | 8.1 | 112 | 121 | 121 | 129 | 155 | 175 | 177 | |
| Independent | Donnie Steele (incumbent) | 7.9 | 110 | 129 | 129 | 132 | 155 | | | |
| Independent | Ronald MacKinnon (incumbent) | 6.4 | 89 | 101 | 101 | 109 | | | | |
| Independent | Gerry MacLeod | 2.09 | 29 | 30 | 30 | | | | | |
Electorate: 2,506 Valid: 1,387 Spoilt: 44 Quota: 278 Turnout: 57.1%

=== Beinn na Foghla agus Uibhist a Tuath ===
Independent councillor Uisdean Robertson retained the seat he had won at the previous election while independent candidates Iain MacLeod and Roddy MacKay gained seats from former independent councillor Neil Beaton and Labour who did not contest the election. In 2015, former independent councillor Andrew Walker was elected in a by-election.

Beinn na Foghla agus Uibhist a Tuath – 3 seats
| Party | Candidate | FPv% | Count | | | | | | | |
| Party | Candidate | FPv% | 1 | 2 | 3 | 4 | 5 | 6 | 7 | 8 |
|---|---|---|---|---|---|---|---|---|---|---|
| Independent | Uisdean Robertson (incumbent) | 28.8 | 355 | | | | | | | |
| Independent | Iain MacLeod | 19.2 | 237 | 242 | 247 | 261 | 275 | 318 | | |
| Independent | Roddy MacKay | 16.0 | 197 | 202 | 209 | 215 | 236 | 261 | 264 | 342 |
| SNP | Roslyn MacPherson | 12.6 | 156 | 159 | 162 | 170 | 180 | 201 | 202 | |
| Independent | Andrew Walker (incumbent) | 8.3 | 102 | 115 | 126 | 139 | 161 | | | |
| Independent | Neil Beaton (incumbent) | 5.8 | 71 | 79 | 89 | 97 | | | | |
| Independent | John MacLeod | 5.3 | 65 | 67 | 74 | | | | | |
| Conservative | Ken MacBrayne | 4.1 | 51 | 51 | | | | | | |
Electorate: 2,342 Valid: 1,234 Spoilt: 26 Quota: 309 Turnout: 53.8%

=== Na Hearadh agus Ceann a Deas nan Loch ===
The SNP retained the seat they had won at the previous election while independent candidates Finlay Cunningham and Paul Finnegan gained a seat from former independent councillor Catherine MacDonald and Labour who did not contest the election. In 2012, independent candidate D. J. MacRae was elected as a Labour candidate.

Na Hearadh agus Ceann a Deas nan Loch – 3 seats
| Party | Candidate | FPv% | Count | | | | | | | |
| Party | Candidate | FPv% | 1 | 2 | 3 | 4 | 5 | 6 | 7 | 8 |
|---|---|---|---|---|---|---|---|---|---|---|
| Independent | Finlay Cunningham | 33.2 | 381 | | | | | | | |
| Independent | Paul Finnegan | 16.5 | 189 | 214 | 215 | 219 | 224 | 239 | 261 | 359 |
| SNP | John Mitchell | 15.0 | 172 | 179 | 179 | 181 | 220 | 228 | 236 | 278 |
| Independent | Catherine McDonald (incumbent) | 14.5 | 166 | 187 | 187 | 191 | 195 | 199 | 218 | |
| Independent | Sheena MacLeod | 7.0 | 80 | 91 | 91 | 95 | 98 | 126 | | |
| Independent | Denise Wilson | 5.6 | 64 | 66 | 70 | 72 | 73 | | | |
| SNP | Fiona MacLeod | 4.1 | 47 | 50 | 51 | 55 | | | | |
| Independent | D. J. MacRae (incumbent) | 3.7 | 42 | 43 | 45 | | | | | |
| Independent | Alex Smith | 0.6 | 7 | 7 | | | | | | |
Electorate: 1,860 Valid: 1,148 Spoilt: 28 Quota: 288 Turnout: 63.2%

=== Sgir' Uige agus Ceann a Tuath nan Loch ===
Independent councillor Norman MacDonald retained the seat he had won at the previous election while the Conservatives and independent councillor Angus Morrison gained a seat from the SNP and former independent councillor Cudig MacLeod. In 2012, former Cllr Morrison was elected in a by-election.

Sgir' Uige agus Ceann a Tuath nan Loch – 3 seats
| Party | Candidate | FPv% | Count | | | |
| Party | Candidate | FPv% | 1 | 2 | 3 | 4 |
|---|---|---|---|---|---|---|
| Independent | Angus Morrison (incumbent) | 48.4 | 679 | | | |
| Independent | Norman MacDonald (incumbent) | 19.3 | 271 | 352 | | |
| Conservative | Ranald Fraser | 19.1 | 268 | 332 | 332 | 471 |
| Independent | Cudig MacLeod (incumbent) | 13.3 | 186 | 283 | 283 | |
Electorate: 2,417 Valid: 1,404 Spoilt: 25 Quota: 352 Turnout: 59.1%

=== Sgìre an Rubha ===
Independent councillor Alasdair MacLeod retained the seat he had won at the previous election while independent candidates Norrie MacDonald and Finlay Stewart gained a seat from former independent councillors Zena Stewart and Norman MacLeod.

Sgìre an Rubha – 3 seats
| Party | Candidate | FPv% | Count | | | | | |
| Party | Candidate | FPv% | 1 | 2 | 3 | 4 | 5 | 6 |
|---|---|---|---|---|---|---|---|---|
| Independent | Norrie MacDonald | 32.0 | 354 | | | | | |
| Independent | Alasdair MacLeod (incumbent) | 29.7 | 329 | | | | | |
| Independent | Finlay Stewart | 13.6 | 151 | 169 | 191 | 213 | 267 | 338 |
| Independent | Tony Robson | 8.2 | 91 | 113 | 124 | 141 | 162 | |
| Independent | John MacMillan | 9.0 | 100 | 113 | 120 | 133 | | |
| Conservative | Don MacDonald | 7.4 | 83 | 88 | 92 | | | |
Electorate: 1,905 Valid: 1,108 Spoilt: 26 Quota: 278 Turnout: 59.5%

=== Steòrnabhagh a Deas ===
The SNP as well as independent councillors Charlie Nicolson and Angus McCormack retained the seats they had won at the previous election while independent candidate Keith Dodson gained a seat from former independent councillor Angus Campbell.

Steòrnabhagh a Deas – 4 seats
| Party | Candidate | FPv% | Count | | | | | | | |
| Party | Candidate | FPv% | 1 | 2 | 3 | 4 | 5 | 6 | 7 | 8 |
|---|---|---|---|---|---|---|---|---|---|---|
| Independent | Charlie Nicolson (incumbent) | 49.25 | 755 | | | | | | | |
| SNP | Rae MacKenzie (incumbent) | 16.3 | 250 | 345 | | | | | | |
| Independent | Angus McCormack (incumbent) | 10.8 | 165 | 290 | 299 | 308 | | | | |
| Independent | Keith Dodson | 10.2 | 156 | 207 | 214 | 215 | 215 | 229 | 276 | 331 |
| Independent | Shonnie MacRitchie | 5.0 | 77 | 161 | 165 | 170 | 171 | 190 | 196 | |
| Independent | Caroline Brick | 5.0 | 76 | 81 | 84 | 86 | 86 | 92 | | |
| Independent | Derek McPherson | 3.1 | 47 | 63 | 66 | 68 | 68 | | | |
| Independent | Campbell McKenzie | 0.5 | 7 | 17 | 18 | | | | | |
Electorate: 2,984 Valid: 1,533 Spoilt: 43 Quota: 307 Turnout: 52.8%

=== Steòrnabhagh a Tuath ===
The SNP as well as independent councillors Roddie MacKay and Iain MacAulay retained the seats they had won at the previous election while independent candidate Neil MacKay gained a seat from former independent councillor Iain MacKenzie.

Steòrnabhagh a Tuath – 4 seats
| Party | Candidate | FPv% | Count | | | | |
| Party | Candidate | FPv% | 1 | 2 | 3 | 4 | 5 |
|---|---|---|---|---|---|---|---|
| SNP | Gordon Murray (incumbent) | 34.4 | 486 | | | | |
| Independent | Roddie MacKay (incumbent) | 28.2 | 398 | | | | |
| Independent | Iain MacAulay (incumbent) | 17.6 | 249 | 321 | | | |
| Independent | Neil MacKay | 10.3 | 145 | 190 | 251 | 269 | 357 |
| Independent | Lesley McKenzie | 9.5 | 134 | 163 | 176 | 183 | |
Electorate: 2,993 Valid: 1,412 Spoilt: 28 Quota: 283 Turnout: 48.1%

=== Loch a Tuath ===
The SNP as well as independent councillor Donald Crichton retained the seats they had two at the previous election while independent candidate Calum MacLean gained a seat from former independent councillor Catriona Stewart.

Loch a Tuath – 3 seats
| Party | Candidate | FPv% | Count | | | | |
| Party | Candidate | FPv% | 1 | 2 | 3 | 4 | 5 |
|---|---|---|---|---|---|---|---|
| Independent | Donald Crichton (incumbent) | 46.0 | 590 | | | | |
| Independent | Calum MacLean | 17.9 | 230 | 344 | | | |
| SNP | John A. MacIver (incumbent) | 17.9 | 230 | 271 | 276 | 298 | 335 |
| Independent | Iain MacIver | 6.1 | 78 | 115 | 119 | 137 | 170 |
| Independent | Ruaraidh Ferguson | 6.2 | 80 | 110 | 113 | 132 | |
| Independent | Allan MacLachlan | 5.8 | 74 | 98 | 104 | | |
Electorate: 2,255 Valid: 1,282 Spoilt: 35 Quota: 321 Turnout: 58.4%

=== An Taobh Siar agus Nis ===
The SNP as well as independent councillor John MacKay retained the seats they had won at the previous election while independent candidates John N. MacLeod and Kenny J. MacLeod gained a seat from former independent councillors Iain Morrison and Kenneth Murray. In 2015, Alistair MacLennan and Cllr MacLeod were elected in separate by-elections.

An Taobh Siar agus Nis – 4 seats
| Party | Candidate | FPv% | Count | | | | | |
| Party | Candidate | FPv% | 1 | 2 | 3 | 4 | 5 | 6 |
|---|---|---|---|---|---|---|---|---|
| Independent | John N. MacLeod (incumbent) | 23.7 | 339 | | | | | |
| SNP | Kenneth MacLeod (incumbent) | 19.4 | 277 | 286 | | | | |
| Independent | Kenny J. MacLeod | 16.7 | 239 | 260 | 261 | 310 | | |
| Independent | John MacKay (incumbent) | 15.4 | 220 | 224 | 224 | 254 | 261 | 339 |
| Independent | Alistair MacLennan (incumbent) | 13.5 | 193 | 200 | 201 | 238 | 247 | |
| Independent | Malcolm McTaggart | 11.3 | 161 | 164 | 164 | | | |
Electorate: 2,541 Valid: 1,429 Spoilt: 35 Quota: 286 Turnout: 57.6%

== Changes since 2017 ==
On 23 July 2020, Na Hearadh agus Ceann a Deas nan Loch Independent Councillor Finlay Cunningham stepped down from the Council. A by-election to replace him was held on 8 October 2020 and was won by Independent candidate Grant Fulton.

Na Hearadh agus Ceann a Deas nan Loch by-election (8 October 2020) – 1 seat
| Party | Candidate | FPv% | Count |
| Party | Candidate | FPv% | 1 |
|---|---|---|---|
| Independent | Grant Fulton | 74.9 | 536 |
| Independent | Annie MacDonald | 22.1 | 158 |
| Independent | Kris O'Donnell | 3.1 | 22 |
Electorate: 1,912 Valid: 716 Spoilt: 5 Quota: 359 Turnout: 37.7%

== Ward areas in English ==
- Barraigh, Bhatarsaigh, Eirisgeigh agus Uibhist a Deas (ward): Barra, Vatersay, Eriskay and South Uist
- Beinn na Foghla agus Uibhist a Tuath (ward): Benbecula and North Uist
- Na Hearadh agus Ceann a Deas Nan Loch (ward): Harris and South Lewis
- Sgir' Uige agus Ceann a Tuath Nan Loch (ward): Mid Lewis
- Sgire an Rubha (ward): Eye Peninsula (locally known as "Point")
- Steòrnabhagh a Deas (ward): Stornoway South
- Steòrnabhagh a Tuath (ward): Stornoway North
- Loch a Tuath (ward): Broad Bay
- An Taobh Siar agus Nis (ward): North West Lewis (West Side & Ness)
