= 2003 Comhairle nan Eilean Siar election =

← 1999	1 May 2003	2007 →

All 31 seats to Western Isles Council 16 seats needed for a majority

	First party	Second party	Third party
Leader	Alex Macdonald
Party	Independent	Labour	SNP
Leader's seat	Carloway
Last election	22 seats, 74.1%	5 seats, 10.1%	4 seats, 15.8%
Seats won	24	4	3
Seat change	▲2	▼1	▼1
Popular vote	4,914	1,110	930
Percentage	70.7%	16.0%	13.4%
Swing	▼3.7%	▲5.9%	▼2.4%
Council Convener before election
Alex Macdonald
Independent
Council Convener after election
Alex Macdonald
Independent

An election to the Comhairle nan Eilean Siar (Western Isles Council) was held on 1 May 2003 as part of the wider 2003 Scottish local elections.

== Aggregate results ==
Comhairle nan Eilean Siar election, 2003 Turnout in contested wards: 64.1% (6,954)
Party	Seats	Gains	Losses	Net gain/loss	Seats %	Votes %	Votes	+/−
Independent	24	2	0	▲2	77.4	70.7	4,914	▼3.4
Labour	4	0	1	▼1	12.9	16.0	1,110	▲5.9
SNP	3	0	1	▼1	9.7	13.4	930	▼2.4

== Ward results ==
Port of Ness
Party	Candidate	Votes	%
Independent	S.E.L. Hawkins	unopposed	unopposed
Majority		unopposed	unopposed
Independent hold			

Dell
Party	Candidate	Votes	%
Independent	John Mackay	298	60.1%
Labour	M.J. Macleod (Incumbent)	198	39.9%
Majority		100	11.2%
Independent gain from Labour			

Barvas & Arnol
Party	Candidate	Votes	%
Independent	Iain Morrison (Incumbent)	266	56.7%
Independent	R. Macdonald	203	43.3%
Majority		63	13.4%
Independent hold			

Shawbost
Party	Candidate	Votes	%
Independent	R. Morrison (Incumbent)	293	62.6%
Independent	Kenneth Murray	175	37.4%
Majority		118	15.2%
Independent hold			

Carloway
Party	Candidate	Votes	%
Independent	Alex MacDonald (Incumbent)	286	63.8%
Independent	A. Macleod	162	36.2%
Majority		124	27.6%
Independent hold			

Uig
Party	Candidate	Votes	%
Labour	Norman MacDonald (Incumbent)	314	85.8%
SNP	C.J. Ryan	52	14.2%
Majority		262	71.6%
Labour hold			

Gress
Party	Candidate	Votes	%
Independent	Angus Graham (Incumbent)	347	67.0%
Independent	John Maciver	171	33.0%
Majority		176	34.0%
Independent hold			

Coll
Party	Candidate	Votes	%
Independent	C.I. Graham (Incumbent)	unopposed	unopposed
Majority		unopposed	unopposed
Independent hold			

Blackwater
Party	Candidate	Votes	%
Independent	Iain Macleod (Incumbent)	unopposed	unopposed
Majority		unopposed	unopposed
Independent hold			

Laxdale
Party	Candidate	Votes	%
Independent	Neil Campbell	230	63.0%
Labour	F. Cowan	135	37.0%
Majority		95	26.0%
Independent gain from Labour			

Coulregrein
Party	Candidate	Votes	%
Labour	G. Lonie (Incumbent)	unopposed	unopposed
Majority		unopposed	unopposed
Labour hold			

Castle
Party	Candidate	Votes	%
SNP	A. Nicolson (Incumbent)	unopposed	unopposed
Majority		unopposed	unopposed
SNP hold			

Manor Park
Party	Candidate	Votes	%
Independent	Murdo Macleod	unopposed	unopposed
Majority		unopposed	unopposed
Independent gain from Labour			

Goathill
Party	Candidate	Votes	%
Independent	N. Macdonald (Incumbent)	unopposed	unopposed
Majority		unopposed	unopposed
Independent hold			

Bayhead
Party	Candidate	Votes	%
Independent	Keith Dodson	220	55.1%
Labour	J. Mackillop	121	30.3%
Independent	Stanley Bennie	58	14.5%
Majority		99	24.8%
Independent hold			

Newton
Party	Candidate	Votes	%
Independent	Angus Campbell (Incumbent)	unopposed	unopposed
Majority		unopposed	unopposed
Independent hold			

Plasterfield
Party	Candidate	Votes	%
Independent	Angus McCormack	202	47.2%
Independent	C.M. Macleay	120	28.0%
Independent	A.G. Scott	106	24.8%
Majority		82	19.2%
Independent gain from SNP			

Braighe
Party	Candidate	Votes	%
Independent	Donald Nicholson (Incumbent)	unopposed	unopposed
Majority		unopposed	unopposed
Independent hold			

Knock & Bayble
Party	Candidate	Votes	%
Independent	Norman Macleod (Incumbent)	unopposed	unopposed
Majority		unopposed	unopposed
Independent hold			

Tiumpan
Party	Candidate	Votes	%
Independent	Donald Macsween (Incumbent)	260	62.2%
Labour	D.J. Smith	158	37.8%
Majority		102	24.4%
Independent hold			

North Lochs
Party	Candidate	Votes	%
Independent	Alex Mackintosh	263	59.5%
SNP	Gordon Anderson	179	40.5%
Majority		84	19.0%
Independent hold			

Lochs
Party	Candidate	Votes	%
SNP	Alex MacDonald	230	51.8%
Independent	R.M. Mackenzie	214	48.2%
Majority		16	3.6%
SNP gain from Independent			

Harris West
Party	Candidate	Votes	%
Independent	Morag Munro (Incumbent)	465	88.1%
Independent	A.A. Ross	63	11.9%
Majority		402	76.2%
Independent hold			

Paible
Party	Candidate	Votes	%
Labour	Archie Campbell (Incumbent)	unopposed	unopposed
Majority		unopposed	unopposed
Labour hold			

Lochmaddy
Party	Candidate	Votes	%
Independent	D. Maclean (Incumbent)	unopposed	unopposed
Majority		unopposed	unopposed
Independent hold			

North Benbecula
Party	Candidate	Votes	%
Independent	Martin Taylor	unopposed	unopposed
Majority		unopposed	unopposed
Independent hold			

Eochar
Party	Candidate	Votes	%
Independent	Peter Carlin	unopposed	unopposed
Majority		unopposed	unopposed
Independent hold			

Locheynort
Party	Candidate	Votes	%
Labour	Ronald Mackinnon (Incumbent)	184	54.6%
SNP	Gerry Macleod	153	45.4%
Majority		31	9.2%
Labour gain from Independent			

Daliburgh & Eriskay
Party	Candidate	Votes	%
Independent	Angus Macdonald	168	50.8%
Independent	David Blaney (Incumbent)	163	49.2%
Majority		5	1.6%
Independent hold			

Barra & Vatersay
Party	Candidate	Votes	%
SNP	Donald Manford (Incumbent)	316	63.6%
Independent	A.F. Macleod	181	36.4%
Majority		135	17.2%
SNP hold			
