= Gasker =

Islet in the Outer Hebrides, Scotland

Gàisgeir (Gaelic)

Location
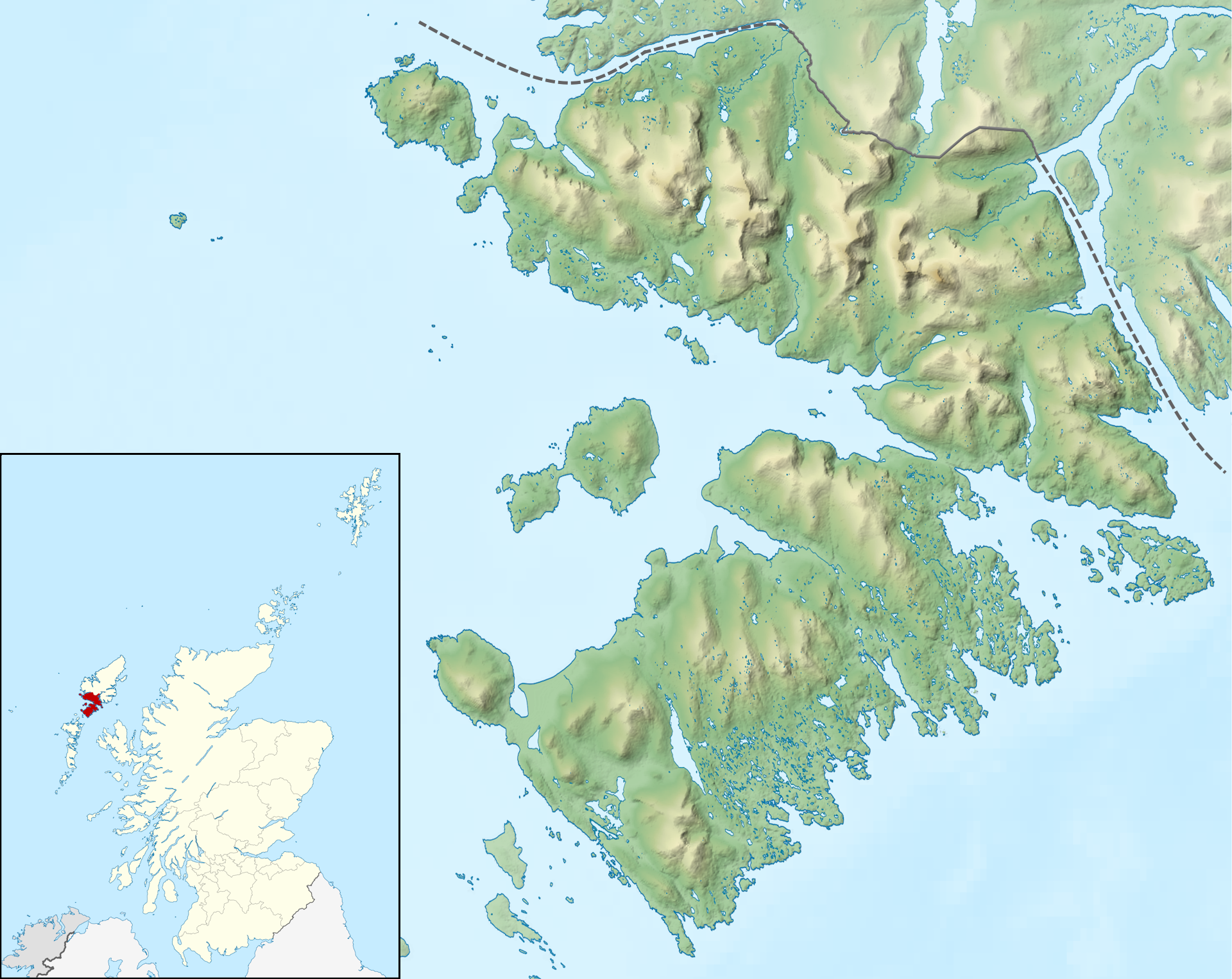
- Gasker shown next to Harris Gasker shown within the Outer Hebrides
- OS grid reference: NA970151
- Coordinates: 57.98343°N 7.28699°W

Physical geography
- Island group: Harris and Lewis
- Area: 20 ha (1/8 sq mi)
- Highest elevation: 32 m (105 ft)

Administration
- Council area: Western Isles
- Country: Scotland
- Sovereign state: United Kingdom

Demographics
- Population: 0

Gasker is a small uninhabited islet in the Outer Hebrides of Scotland, 8 kilometres (4 1/2 nautical miles) southwest of Scarp, off the west coast of Harris.

The low-lying island has never been inhabited. In spite of its small size, it has several small pools of fresh water. It is principally noted for its large well-established seal colony. Residents of Scarp once visited Gasker regularly to kill seals for food.

There are two feasible landing spots for small craft: Geo Iar on the north side of Gasker, and Geodha Ear on the south side. A small unmanned lighthouse was built by the Northern Lighthouse Board in 1997.

1.2 kilometres (5/8 nmi) east-southeast lies the smaller islet of Gàisgeir Beag, and some surrounding rocks.

== See also ==
- List of islands of Scotland

== Bibliography ==
- Haswell-Smith, Hamish (2015). The Scottish Islands: The Bestselling Guide to Every Scottish Island. Edinburgh: Canongate Books Ltd. ISBN 9781782116783.
- Mac an Tàilleir, Iain (2003) Goireasan Cànain / Language Resources - Tadhail is Ionnsaich : Pàrlamaid na h-Alba. (pdf) Pàrlamaid na h-Alba. Retrieved 26 October 2025.
