= Sgir' Uige agus Ceann a Tuath nan Loch (ward) =

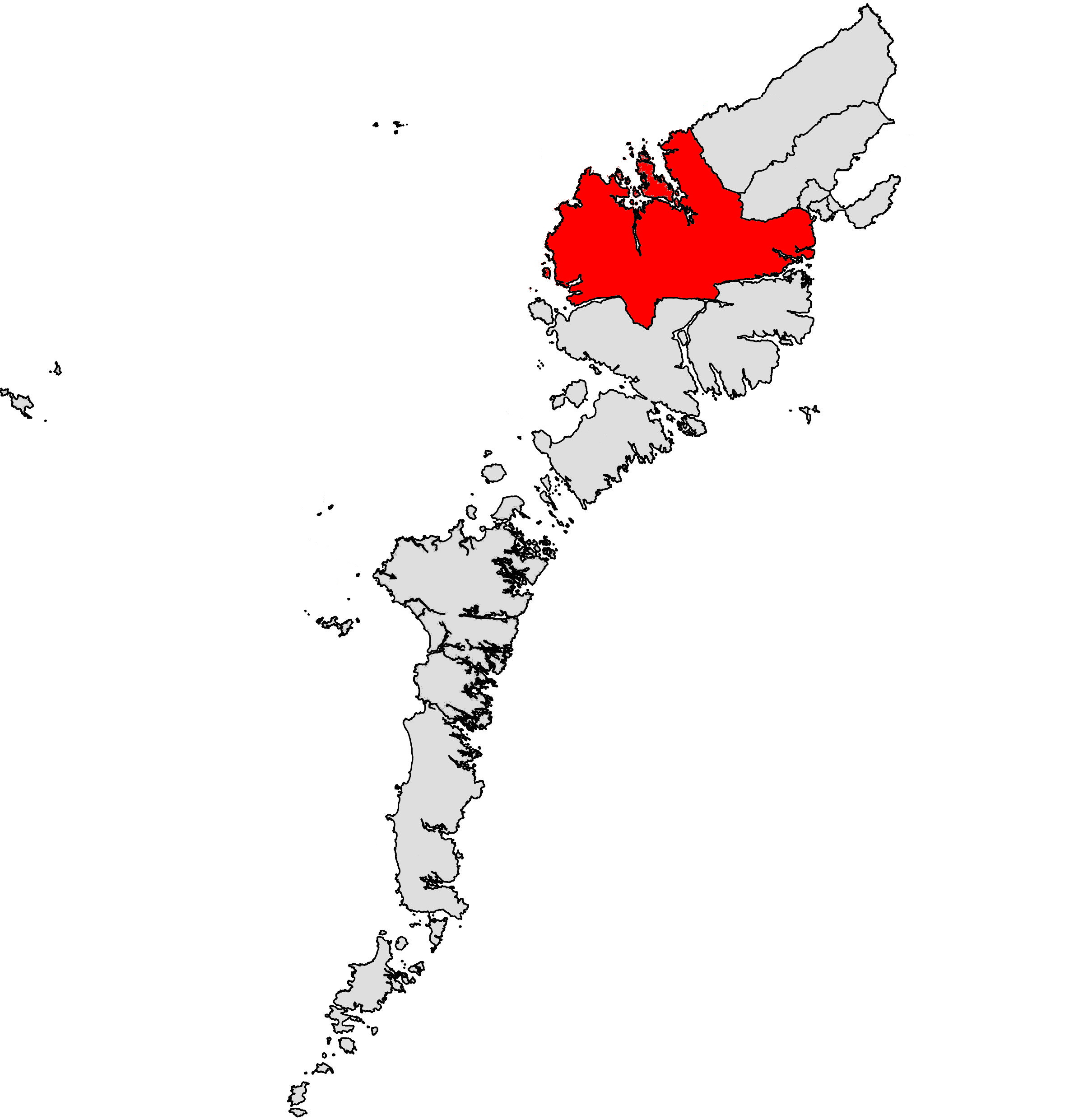
Location of the ward

Sgir’ Uige agus Ceann a Tuath Nan Loch (English: Mid Lewis) was one of the nine wards used to elect members of the Comhairle nan Eilean Siar. It elected three Councillors.

== Councillors ==
| Election | Councillors | | |
|---|---|---|---|
| 2007 | Alex MacDonald (Ind.) | Annie MacDonald (SNP) | Norman Alexander MacDonald (Labour) |
| 2012 | Alex MacDonald (Ind.) | Bill Houston (SNP) | Cudig MacLeod (Ind.) |
| 2017 | Alex MacDonald (Ind.) | Ranald Fraser (Conservative) | Angus Morrison (Ind.) |

== Election results ==
=== 2017 Election ===
2017 Comhairle nan Eilean Siar election

Sgir’ Uige agus Ceann a Tuath Nan Loch
| Party | Candidate | FPv% | Count | | | |
| Party | Candidate | FPv% | 1 | 2 | 3 | 4 |
|---|---|---|---|---|---|---|
| Independent | Angus Morrison (incumbent) | 48.36 | 679 | | | |
| Independent | Norman Alexander MacDonald (incumbent) | 19.3 | 271 | 352.87 | | |
| Conservative | Ranald Fraser | 19.09 | 268 | 332.05 | 332.22 | 471.66 |
| Independent | Cudig MacLeod (incumbent) | 13.25 | 186 | 283.28 | 283.74 | |
Electorate: TBC Valid: 1,404 Spoilt: 25 Quota: 352 Turnout: 1,429 (59.1%)

=== 2012 Election ===
2012 Comhairle nan Eilean Siar election

Sgir’ Uige agus Ceann a Tuath Nan Loch
| Party | Candidate | FPv% | Count | | | | | | |
| Party | Candidate | FPv% | 1 | 2 | 3 | 4 | 5 | 6 | 7 |
|---|---|---|---|---|---|---|---|---|---|
| Independent | Norman Alexander MacDonald (incumbent) | 21.62% | 315 | 321 | 340 | 355 | 364.0 | | |
| SNP | Bill Houston† | 20.37% | 292 | 297 | 313 | 401 | | | |
| Independent | Cudig MacLeod | 16.25% | 233 | 240 | 307 | 339 | 348.9 | 350.3 | 521.8 |
| Independent | Catherine MacIver | 15.97% | 229 | 238 | 253 | 278 | 284.2 | 285.5 | |
| SNP | Annie MacDonald (incumbent) | 11.99% | 172 | 176 | 185 | | | | |
| Independent | Norman A. P. MacDonald | 10.25% | 147 | 152 | | | | | |
| Independent | Barry Shelby | 3.21% | 46 | | | | | | |
Electorate: 2,424 Valid: 1,434 Spoilt: 23 Quota: 359 Turnout: 1,457 (60.11%)

=== 2007 Election ===
2007 Comhairle nan Eilean Siar election

Comhairle nan Eilean Siar election, 2007: Sgir’ Uige Agus Ceann A Tuath Nan Loch
| Party | Candidate | FPv% | % | Seat | Count |
|---|---|---|---|---|---|
| SNP | Annie MacDonald | 442 | 26.9 | 1 | 1 |
| Independent | Alex MacDonald | 406 | 24.7 | 2 | 2 |
| Labour | Norman Alexander MacDonald | 295 | 18.0 | 3 | 6 |
| Independent | Gordon Anderson | 246 | 15.0 | | |
| Independent | Alex MacIntosh | 130 | 7.9 | | |
| Independent | John Angus MacDonald | 124 | 7.5 | | |
