= Sgìr' Ùige agus Carlabhagh =

Electoral ward in the Outer Hebrides, Scotland

- Na h-Eileanan Siar
- Boundary of Sgìr' Ùige agus Carlabhagh in .
- Population: 1,820 (2021)
- Electorate: 1,329 (2022)
- Major settlements: Carloway; Uig
- Scottish Parliament constituency: Na h-Eileanan an Iar
- Scottish Parliament region: Highlands and Islands
- UK Parliament constituency: Na h-Eileanan an Iar

Current ward
- Created: 2022
- Number of councillors: 2
- Councillor: Ranald Fraser (Conservative)
- Councillor: Norman M. MacDonald (Independent)
- Created from: Sgir' Uige agus Ceann a Tuath nan Loch

Sgìr' Ùige agus Carlabhagh (Scottish Gaelic for 'Uig and Carloway') is one of the 11 wards of Comhairle nan Eilean Siar (Scottish Gaelic for 'Council of the Western Isles'). Created in 2022, the ward elects two councillors using the single transferable vote electoral system and covers an area with a population of 1,820 people.

== Boundaries ==
The ward was created following the 2019 Reviews of Electoral Arrangements which were instigated following the implementation of the Islands (Scotland) Act 2018. The act allowed for the creation of single- and dual-member wards to allow for better representation of island areas. Sgìr' Ùige agus Carlabhagh was formed from the western portion of the previous Sgir' Uige agus Ceann a Tuath nan Loch ward. The ward centres around the towns of Breasclete, Callanish, Carloway and Uig and takes in an area in the west of the Isle of Lewis in the Outer Hebrides. It includes the remote and uninhabited Flannan Isles in the Atlantic Ocean.

== Councillors ==
Election	Councillors	
2022	Ranald Fraser (Conservative)	Vacant
2022 by-election	Ranald Fraser (Conservative)	Norman M. MacDonald (Independent)

== Election results ==
=== 2022 by-election ===
Sgìr' Ùige agus Carlabhagh by-election (30 June 2022) – 1 seat
Party	Candidate	FPv%	Count					
Party	Candidate	FPv%	1	2	3	4	5	6
Independent	Norman M. MacDonald	35.4	222	222	230	238	256	278
Liberal Democrats	Jamie Dobson	20.4	128	128	129	142	159	220
Independent	Sophie B. Brown	18.0	113	113	114	119	148	
SNP	Laura F. Cameron-Lewis	15.3	96	97	97	112		
Green	Anne E. Edwards	9.1	57	57	57			
Independent	Donald J. MacLeod	1.8	11	11				
Independent	Iain J. MacKinnon	0.2	1					
Electorate: 1,329 Valid: 628 Spoilt: 6 Quota: 315 Turnout: 47.7%

=== 2022 election ===
Sgìr' Ùige agus Carlabhagh – 2 seats
Party	Candidate	Votes	%
Conservative	Ranald Fraser (Note: Sitting councillor for Sgir' Uige agus Ceann a Tuath nan Loch.)	Unopposed	
Registered electors			
Conservative win (new seat)			
