= Barraigh agus Bhatarsaigh =

Electoral ward in the Outer Hebrides, Scotland

- Na h-Eileanan Siar
- Boundary of Barraigh agus Bhatarsaigh in .
- Population: 1,308 (2021)
- Electorate: 971 (2022)
- Major settlements: Castlebay
- Scottish Parliament constituency: Na h-Eileanan an Iar
- Scottish Parliament region: Highlands and Islands
- UK Parliament constituency: Na h-Eileanan an Iar

Current ward
- Created: 2022
- Number of councillors: 2
- Councillor: Kenneth J. MacLean (Independent)
- Councillor: Iain A. MacNeil (Independent)
- Created from: Barraigh, Bhatarsaigh, Eirisgeigh agus Uibhist a Deas

Barraigh agus Bhatarsaigh (Scottish Gaelic for 'Barra and Vatersay') [ˈparˠaj əkəs̪ ˈvahtərˠs̪ai] is one of the eleven wards of Comhairle nan Eilean Siar (Scottish Gaelic for 'Council of the Western Isles'). Created in 2022, the ward elects two councillors using the single transferable vote electoral system and covers an area with a population of 1,308 people.

== Boundaries ==
The ward was created following the 2019 Reviews of Electoral Arrangements which were instigated following the implementation of the Islands (Scotland) Act 2018. The act allowed for the creation of single- and dual-member wards to allow for better representation of island areas. Barraigh agus Bhatarsaigh was formed from the previous Barraigh, Bhatarsaigh, Eirisgeigh agus Uibhist a Deas ward. The ward is centred around the islands of Barra and Vatersay in the south of the Outer Hebrides and includes the uninhabited islands of the Barra Isles as well as Fiaraidh, Fuday, Gighay, Hellisay and Orosay in the Sound of Barra.

== Councillors ==
Election	Councillors	
2022	Kenneth J. MacLean (Independent)	Vacant
2022 by-election	Kenneth J. MacLean (Independent)	Iain A. MacNeil (Independent)

== Election results ==
=== 2022 by-election ===
Barraigh agus Bhatarsaigh by-election (30 June 2022) – 1 seat
Party	Candidate	FPv%	Count	
Party	Candidate	FPv%	1	2
Independent	Iain A. MacNeil	49.3	189	197
Independent	Gerard Macdonald	47.3	181	182
Independent	Calum Macmillan	3.4	13	
Electorate: 971 Valid: 383 Spoilt: 2 Quota: 193 Turnout: 39.6%

=== 2022 election ===
Barraigh agus Bhatarsaigh – 2 seats
Party	Candidate	Votes	%
Independent	Kenneth J. MacLean	Unopposed	
Registered electors			
Independent win (new seat)			
