= 2007 Comhairle nan Eilean Siar election =

← 2003	3 May 2007	2012 →

All 31 seats to Western Isles Council 16 seats needed for a majority
	First party	Second party	Third party
Leader	Alex Macdonald
Party	Independent	SNP	Labour
Leader's seat	Sgir’ Uige Agus Ceann A Tuath Nan Loch
Last election	24 seats, 70.7%	3 seats, 13.4%	4 seats, 16.0%
Seats won	25	4	2
Seat change	▲1	0	▼1
Popular vote	10,853	1,661	916
Percentage	78.8%	12.1%	6.7%
Swing	▲8.1%	▼1.3%	▼9.3%
Council Convener before election
Alex Macdonald
Independent
Council Convener after election
Alex Macdonald
Independent

Elections to Comhairle nan Eilean Siar (Western Isles council) were held on 3 May 2007, the same day as the other Scottish local government elections and the Scottish Parliament general election. The election was the first one using 9 new wards created as a result of the Local Governance (Scotland) Act 2004, each ward elected three or four councillors using the single transferable vote system form of proportional representation. The new wards replaced 31 single-member wards which used the plurality (first past the post) system of election.

The large majority of the seats were held by independent candidates, similar to other predominantly rural Scottish councils. The Scottish National Party and Scottish Labour Party had a small representation each, and the Scottish Liberal Democrats stood four candidates, all of whom were unsuccessful.

== Election results ==
Comhairle nan Eilean Siar local election result 2007
Party	Seats	Gains	Losses	Net gain/loss	Seats %	Votes %	Votes	+/−
Independent	25			▲1	80.6	78.8	10,853	▲8.1
SNP	4			▲1	12.9	12.1	1,661	▼1.3
Labour	2			▼2	6.5	6.7	916	▼9.3
Liberal Democrats	0			0	0.0	2.5	340	New

== Ward results ==
=== Barraigh, Bhatarsaigh, Eirisgeigh agus Uibhist a Deas ===
Barraigh, Bhatarsaigh, Eirisgeigh agus Uibhist a Deas - 4 seats
Party	Candidate	FPv%	Count		
Party	Candidate	FPv%	1	2	3
SNP	Donald Manford (Incumbent)	49.0	723		
Independent	David Blaney	15.8	233	281	190
Independent	Peter Carlin (Incumbent)	12.0	177	214	232
Labour	Ronald Mackinnon (Incumbent)	11.0	162	199	211
SNP	Gerry MacLeod	8.5	125	278	289
Independent	Angus Macdonald (Incumbent)	3.9	57	69	

=== Beinn na Foghla agus Uibhist a Tuath ===
Beinn na Foghla agus Uibhist a Tuath - 3 seats
Party	Candidate	FPv%	Count			
Party	Candidate	FPv%	1	2	3	4
Labour	Archie Campbell (Incumbent)	34.9	459			
Independent	Uisdean Robertson	26.1	343			
Independent	Martin Taylor	19.1	251	296	302	333
Independent	Angus Macaulay	15.4	203	230	232	255
Independent	John Huson	4.4	58	78	80	

=== Na Hearadh agus Ceann a Deas nan Loch ===
Na Hearadh agus Ceann a Deas nan Loch - 3 seats
Party	Candidate	FPv%	Count				
Party	Candidate	FPv%	1	2	3	4	5
Independent	Morag Munro (Incumbent)	49.0	583				
Independent	Catherine Macdonald	20.1	239	387			
SNP	Philip McLean	11.4	136	171	186	209	240
Independent	Donald MacLeod	7.1	84	107	131	151	188
Independent	Morris Black	6.4	76	89	98	112	
Liberal Democrats	Paul Blake	6.0	71	85	92		

=== Sgir' Uige agus Ceann a Tuath nan Loch ===
Sgir' Uige agus Ceann a Tuath nan Loch - 3 seats
Party	Candidate	FPv%	Count				
Party	Candidate	FPv%	1	2	3	4	5
SNP	Annie Macdonald (Incumbent)	26.9	442				
Independent	Alex Macdonald (Incumbent)	24.7	406	414			
Labour	Norman Macdonald (Incumbent)	18.0	295	300	302	316	358
Independent	Gordon Anderson	15.0	246	250	251	299	346
Independent	Alex Mackintosh (Incumbent)	7.9	130	132	132	149	
Independent	John Macdonald	7.5	124	127	127		

=== Sgire an Rubha ===
Sgire an Rubha - 3 seats
Party	Candidate	FPv%	Count	
Party	Candidate	FPv%	1	2
Independent	Donald MacSween (Incumbent)	38.4	497	
Independent	Norman MacLeod (Incumbent)	34.8	450	
Independent	Donald Nicholson (Incumbent)	18.9	245	345
Liberal Democrats	Stanley Bennie	7.8	246	127

=== Steòrnabhagh a Deas ===
Steòrnabhagh a Deas - 4 seats
Party	Candidate	FPv%	Count				
Party	Candidate	FPv%	1	2	3	4	5
Independent	Charlie Nicolson	36.2	683				
Independent	Angus McCormack (Incumbent)	28.0	529				
Independent	Keith Dodson (Incumbent)	15.5	292	361	404		
Independent	Angus Campbell (Incumbent)	10.0	188	263	310	317	336
Independent	David Morrison	7.3	137	221	249	257	279
Liberal Democrats	Jean Davis	3.2	60	76	83	85	

=== Steòrnabhagh a Deas ===
Steòrnabhagh a Tuath - 4 seats
Party	Candidate	FPv%	Count					
Party	Candidate	FPv%	1	2	3	4	5	6
Independent	Murdo MacLeod (Incumbent)	50.3	920					
Independent	Roddie Mackay	16.7	305	423				
Independent	Iain Mackenzie	11.6	212	352	368			
Independent	Neil Campbell (Incumbent)	9.2	168	222	228	229	237	274
Liberal Democrats	John Cole	5.9	108	136	140	140	146	
Independent	Angus Macmillan	5.2	95	152	166	166	173	200
Independent	Colin Scott	1.1	20	35	35	35		

=== Loch a Tuath ===
Loch a Tuath - 3 seats
Party	Candidate	FPv%	Count		
Party	Candidate	FPv%	1	2	3
Independent	Catriona Stewart	36.0	486		
Independent	Kenneth MacIver	18.4	249	289	346
SNP	Iain Macdonald	17.4	235	261	297
Independent	John MacIver†	17.3	233	273	308
Independent	Alasdair Nicholson	10.9	147	168	

=== An Taobh Siar agus Nis ===
An Taobh Siar agus Nis - 4 seats
Party	Candidate	FPv%	Count				
Party	Candidate	FPv%	1	2	3	4	5
Independent	Iain Morrison (Incumbent)	25.9	463				
Independent	John Mackay (Incumbent)	18.7	335	354	355	395	
Independent	Kenneth Murray	17.5	313	334	335	355	358
Independent	Annie MacSween	15.5	277	291	294	306	323
Independent	Agnes Rennie	14.9	267	288	292	327	338
Independent	Iain MacLeod (Incumbent)	6.6	118	124	126		
Independent	Malcolm McTaggart	0.8	14	15			

== Changes since 2007 Election ==
- †On 25 November 2011 John A. MacIver joined the Scottish National Party and ceased to be an Independent.
