= Comhairle nan Eilean Siar =

Local council for Outer Hebrides, Scotland

- Coat of arms

- Council logo

Type
- Type: Unitary authority

History
- Founded: 16 May 1975

Leadership
- Convener: Kenneth Macleod, Scottish National Party since 17 May 2022
- Leader: Paul Steele, Independent since 17 May 2022
- Chief Executive: Martin Joyce since April 2026

Structure
- Seats: 29 councillors
- Graph of the party split among 29 seats.
- Political groups: All parties (29) Independent (21) SNP (6) Conservative (1) Liberal Democrats (1)
- Length of term: 5 years

Elections
- Voting system: Single transferable vote
- Last election: 5 May 2022
- Next election: 6 May 2027

Motto
- Ardaichidh Fireantachd Cinneach (Scottish Gaelic: "Righteousness exalteth a nation")

Meeting place
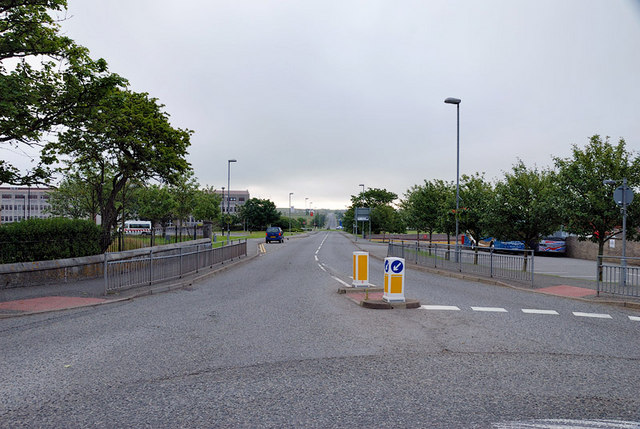
- Council Offices, Sandwick Road, Stornoway, HS1 2BW

Website
- www.cne-siar.gov.uk

Comhairle nan Eilean Siar (Scottish Gaelic for 'Council of the Western Isles'; Scottish Gaelic pronunciation: [ˈkʰõ.ərˠʎə nə ˈɲelan ˈʃiəɾ]) is the local authority for Na h-Eileanan an Iar (the Western Isles, also known as the Outer Hebrides), one of the 32 council areas of Scotland. It is based in Stornoway on the Isle of Lewis.

== Name ==
Pronunciation
- Scots Gaelic: Comhairle nan Eilean Siar
- Pronunciation: [ˈkʰõ.ərˠʎə nə ˈɲelan ˈʃiəɾ]
- Scots Gaelic: Na h-Eileanan an Iar
- Pronunciation: [nə ˈhelanən ə ˈɲiəɾ]
- Scots Gaelic: Na h-Eileanan Siar
- Pronunciation: [nə ˈhelanən ˈʃiəɾ]

Comhairle nan Eilean Siar is the only local council in Scotland to have a Gaelic-only name. When first created in 1975 the council's English language name was 'Western Isles Islands Council', which was changed to 'Western Isles Council' in 1996. In 1998, following the Local Government (Gaelic Names) (Scotland) Act 1997, the Western Isles Council changed the English language version of the area's name from Western Isles to Na h-Eileanan an Iar (Gaelic for 'the Western Isles'), and the name of the council to Comhairle nan Eilean Siar ('Council of the Western Isles'), to be used in both English and Gaelic contexts.

== History ==
In 1975, the council was created as the Western Isles Islands Council under the Local Government (Scotland) Act 1973. The area covered six former districts from two counties: the burgh of Stornoway and the landward district of Lewis from Ross and Cromarty, and the landward districts of Harris, North Uist, South Uist and Barra from Inverness-shire.

The same area had been made a constituency called Western Isles for elections to the House of Commons of the Parliament of the United Kingdom 57 years earlier in 1918. The Westminster constituency was also renamed in English contexts to the Gaelic form of the name, Na h-Eileanan an Iar, in 2005. Since 1999, the area has also been represented by the Na h-Eileanan an Iar constituency of the Scottish Parliament, with the same boundaries.

When the Bank of Credit and Commerce International collapsed in 1991, the then Western Isles Council lost £35m invested there, compelling a large increase in its council tax rate and leading to the resignation of the council's convener, Donald Macaulay. Despite its initial losses, by 2012 the Council had gained a net profit of £1.5 million from dividend repayments due to favourable exchange rates.

Representing Scotland's only majority Gaelic-speaking local authority area, the council pioneered the use of Gaelic-medium education in the 1980s. In 2020, Gaelic became the default language of instruction for all primary school pupils.

At the 2017 election the elected council was entirely male, leading to efforts to encourage more women to stand for election. Two women were elected to the 29-seat council at the subsequent 2022 election.

The council has been a member of the Islands Forum since 2022.

== Political control ==
The first election was held in 1974, with the council initially operating as a shadow authority alongside the outgoing authorities until the new system came into force on 16 May 1975. A majority of the seats on the council have been held by independent councillors since 1975.

Party in control	Years
Independent	1975–present

=== Leadership ===
The council appoints a convener, who chairs full council meetings and acts as the civic figurehead. In 2008 the position of leader of the comhairle was created to provide political leadership, replacing the former position of vice-convener.

The leaders since 2008 have been:

Councillor	Party	From	To
Angus Campbell	Independent	30 Oct 2008	May 2017
Roddie Mackay	Independent	May 2017	May 2022
Paul Steele	Independent	17 May 2022	

The conveners since the council formally came into being in 1975 have been:

Councillor	Party	From	To
Donald Macaulay	Independent	16 May 1975	18 May 1982
Sandy Matheson	Independent	18 May 1982	May 1990
Donald Macaulay	Independent	22 May 1990	10 Sep 1991
Donald Macleod	Independent	17 Sep 1991	16 May 1994
Donald Mackay	Independent	16 May 1994	1999
Alex MacDonald	Independent	1999	May 2012
Norman Macdonald	Independent	May 2012	May 2022
Kenneth Macleod	SNP	17 May 2022	

=== Composition ===
Following the 2022 election, and subsequent by-elections and changes of allegiance up to September 2024, the composition of the council was:

Party	Seats
Independent	21
SNP	6
Conservative	1
Liberal Democrats	1
Total	29

The next election is due in 2027.

== Elections ==
Since the last boundary changes in 2022, the council has comprised 29 councillors representing 11 wards, with each ward electing between two and four councillors. Elections are held every five years.

From 1975 until 2007, council elections used the first past the post system of election; the last elections of this type elected 31 councillors, elected by 31 single-member wards.

In 2007, under the Local Governance (Scotland) Act 2004, the single transferable vote system, together with multi-member wards, was used for the first time, each ward electing three or four councillors. This system is designed to produce a degree of proportional representation.

=== Wards ===
- Barraigh agus Bhatarsaigh
- Uibhist a Deas, Èirisgeigh agus Beinn na Faoghla
- Uibhist a Tuath
- Na Hearadh
- Sgìre nan Loch
- Sgìr' Ùige agus Carlabhagh
- An Taobh Siar agus Nis
- Loch a Tuath
- Steòrnabhagh a Tuath
- Steòrnabhagh a Deas
- Sgire an Rubha

== Premises ==
The council is based at the Council Offices on Sandwick Road in Stornoway. The building was purpose-built for the council in 1979.

== See also ==
- Constitutional status of Orkney, Shetland and the Western Isles
- Lerwick Declaration
