= 2012 Comhairle nan Eilean Siar election =

- 3 May 2012

All 31 seats to Comhairle nan Eilean Siar 16 seats needed for a majority
	First party	Second party	Third party
Leader	Angus Campbell	Donald Manford	Archie K. Campbell
Party	Independent	SNP	Labour
Leader's seat	Steòrnabhagh a Deas	Barraigh, Bhatarsaigh, Eirisgeigh agus Uibhist a Deas	Beinn Na Foghla agus Uibhist a Tuath
Last election	25 seats, 80.6%	4 seats, 12.9%	2 seats, 6.5%
Seats before	25	5	1
Seats won	21	7	3
Seat change	▼4	▲3	▲1
Popular vote	8,211	2,733	523
Percentage	71.6%	23.8%	4.6%
Swing	▼7.2%	▲11.7%	▼2.1%
- Map of council wards
Council Leader before election
Angus Campbell
Independent
Council Leader after election
Angus Campbell
Independent

Elections to Comhairle nan Eilean Siar (Western Isles Council) were held on 3 May 2012, the same day as the other Scottish local government elections. The election was the second one using the nine wards created as a result of the Local Governance (Scotland) Act 2004. Each ward elected three or four councillors using the single transferable vote system: a form of proportional representation. A total of 31 councillors were elected.

Independent councillors retained the large majority of seats on the council and retained control of the administration. The Scottish National Party increased their representation, gaining four seats on the Isle of Lewis while losing one seat on Barra. The Scottish Labour Party also gained an additional seat.

== Election result ==
Comhairle nan Eilean Siar local election result 2012
Party	Seats	Gains	Losses	Net gain/loss	Seats %	Votes %	Votes	+/−
Independent	21	1	5	▼4	67.7	71.6	8,211	▼7.2
SNP	7	4	1	▲3	22.6	23.8	2,733	▲11.7
Labour	3	2	1	▲1	9.7	4.6	523	▼2.1

Note: "Votes" are the first preference votes. The net gain/loss and percentage changes relate to the result of the previous Scottish local elections on 3 May 2007. This may differ from other published sources showing gain/loss relative to seats held at dissolution of Scotland's councils.

== Ward results ==
=== Barraigh, Bhatarsaigh, Eirisgeigh agus Uibhist a Deas ===
- 2007: 2xSNP; 2xIndependent
- 2012: 2xIndependent; 1xSNP; 1xLab
- 2007–2012 change: Lab gain one seat from SNP

Barraigh, Bhatarsaigh, Eirisgeigh agus Uibhist a Deas – 4 seats
Party	Candidate	FPv%	Count									
Party	Candidate	FPv%	1	2	3	4	5	6	7	8	9	10
SNP	Donald Manford (incumbent)	37.43%	521									
Labour	Ronald Joseph MacKinnon	15.09%	210	226.3	228.7	234.7	242.8	263.8	292.6			
Independent	Donnie Steele	9.41%	131	142.6	144.6	150.6	155.9	179.4	200.8	204.1	222.2	263.6
Independent	Calum MacMillan	8.84%	123	144.4	147.8	150.3	152.2	156.2	165.2	166.5	192.9	
Independent	David Blaney (incumbent)	8.48%	118	135.2	139.2	142.2	147.7	157.6	183.8	185.9	201.3	247.9
Independent	Peter Carlin (incumbent)	6.47%	90	103	105	106	108.4	114.4				
Independent	Calum MacAulay	5.17%	72	76.2	76.2	77.2	81.1					
SNP	Gerry MacLeod (incumbent)	3.95%	55	135.8	135.8	135.8	143.5	146.5	154.3	155.1		
Independent	Allan MacLeod	2.01%	28	51.7	52.7	53.2						
Independent	Angus MacDonald	1.94%	27	27.9	27.9							
Independent	Eric Wallis	1.22%	17	17.9								
Electorate: 2,510 Valid: 1,392 Spoilt: 30 Quota: 279 Turnout: 1,424 (55.46)%

=== Beinn Na Foghla agus Uibhist a Tuath ===
- 2007: 2xIndependent; 1xLab
- 2012: 2xIndependent; 1xLab
- 2007: No change

Beinn Na Foghla agus Uibhist a Tuath – 3 seats
Party	Candidate	FPv%	Count					
Party	Candidate	FPv%	1	2	3	4	5	6
Independent	Uisdean Robertson (incumbent)	29.34%	316					
Independent	Neil MacDonald Beaton	19.67%	212	222.6	241.1	263.5	264.0	359.7
Labour	Archie K. Campbell (incumbent)†††	18.94%	204	224.4	241.5	271.5		
SNP	Andrew Walker	16.43%	177	181.2	186.5	219.7	219.9	
Independent	Martin Taylor (incumbent)	8.64%	93	97.2	111.5			
Independent	Michael MacLean	6.96%	75	76.3				
Electorate: 2,329 Valid: 1,077 Spoilt: 25 Quota: 270 Turnout: 1,102 (46.24)%

=== Na Hearadh agus Ceann a Deas Nan Loch ===
- 2007: 2xIndependent; 1xSNP
- 2012: 1xIndependent; 1xSNP; 1xLab
- 2007–2012 change: Lab gain one seat from Independent

Na Hearadh agus Ceann a Deas Nan Loch – 3 seats
Party	Candidate	FPv%	Count			
Party	Candidate	FPv%	1	2	3	4
Independent	Catherine MacDonald (incumbent)	62.09%	498			
SNP	Philip Robert MacLean (incumbent)	25.19%	202			
Labour	D.J. MacRae	8.6%	69	163.8	163.9	193.5
SNP	David Cameron Wilson	4.11%	33	105.2	105.8	
Electorate: 1,922 Valid: 802 Spoilt: 18 Quota: 201 Turnout: 830 (41.73)%

=== Sgir' Uige agus Ceann a Tuath Nan Loch ===
- 2007: 1xSNP; 1xIndependent; 1xLab
- 2012: 2xIndependent; 1xSNP
- 2007–2012 change: Independent gain one seat from Lab

Sgir' Uige agus Ceann a Tuath Nan Loch - 3 seats
Party	Candidate	FPv%	Count						
Party	Candidate	FPv%	1	2	3	4	5	6	7
Independent	Norman Alexander MacDonald (incumbent)	21.62%	315	321	340	355	364.0		
SNP	Bill Houston†	20.37%	292	297	313	401			
Independent	Cudig MacLeod	16.25%	233	240	307	339	348.9	350.3	521.8
Independent	Catherine MacIver	15.97%	229	238	253	278	284.2	285.5	
SNP	Annie MacDonald (incumbent)	11.99%	172	176	185				
Independent	Norman A. P. MacDonald	10.25%	147	152					
Independent	Barry Shelby	3.21%	46						
Electorate: 2,424 Valid: 1,434 Spoilt: 23 Quota: 359 Turnout: 1,457 (60.11)%

=== Sgire an Rubha ===
- 2007: 3xIndependent
- 2012: 3xIndependent
- 2007–2012 change: No change

Sgire an Rubha – 3 seats
Party	Candidate	FPv%	Count						
Party	Candidate	FPv%	1	2	3	4	5	6	7
Independent	Zena Stewart	17.52%	205	238	276	316			
Independent	Alasdair MacLeod	17.52%	205	219	242	291	297.8		
Independent	Donald John MacSween (incumbent)	15.13%	177	187	200	227	230.3	231.7	
Independent	Norman MacLeod (incumbent)	15.04%	176	186	202	252	256.2	257.6	349.0
Independent	Donald Nicholson (incumbent)	14.44%	169	183	197				
SNP	John Norman MacDonald	12.05%	141	149					
Independent	Iain Don MacIver	8.29%	97						
Electorate: 1,921 Valid: 1,170 Spoilt: 19 Quota: 293 Turnout: 1,189 (60.91)%

=== Steòrnabhagh a Deas ===
- 2007: 4xIndependent
- 2012: 3xIndependent; 1xSNP
- 2007–2012 change: SNP gain one seat from Independent

Steòrnabhagh a Deas – 4 seats
Party	Candidate	FPv%	Count						
Party	Candidate	FPv%	1	2	3	4	5	6	7
Independent	Charlie Nicolson (incumbent)	45.67%	685						
Independent	Angus Campbell (incumbent)	13.73%	206	287.8	288.8	290.5	311.5		
Independent	Angus McCormack (incumbent)	12.6%	189	298.9	306.2				
Independent	Keith Dodson (incumbent)	11.4%	171	230.9	233.1	234.0	247.3	251.7	
SNP	Rae MacKenzie	9.67%	145	203.9	253.1	254.1	268.9	270.5	365.9
SNP	Bob Duncan	3.8%	57	63.7					
Independent	Uilleam Macleod	3.13%	47	66.1	67.1	67.5			
Electorate: 2,962 Valid: 1,500 Spoilt: 26 Quota: 301 Turnout: 1,526 (50.65)%

=== Steòrnabhagh a Tuath ===
- 2007: 4xIndependent
- 2012: 3xIndependent; 1xSNP
- 2007–2012 change: SNP gain one seat from Independent

Steòrnabhagh a Tuath – 4 seats
Party	Candidate	FPv%	Count								
Party	Candidate	FPv%	1	2	3	4	5	6	7	8	9
Independent	Iain MacKenzie (incumbent)	20.68%	299								
Independent	Roddie MacKay (incumbent)	18.12%	262	264.1	272.1	294.1					
SNP	Mohammed Ahmed	12.17%	176	176.4	179.5	182.5	182.8	194.9	207.1	218.2	
SNP	Gordon Murray	12.03%	174	174.7	180.7	192.7	193.2	208.4	228.7	251.1	358.4
Independent	Murdo Murray	8.30%	120	121.8	123.8	128.4	129.4	142.6	160.9		
Independent	Iain MacLean MacAulay	7.12%	103	103.5	109.6	117.7	118.4	145.7	177.3	221.9	249.0
Independent	David Morrison	6.36%	92	93.1	97.1	104.1	104.8				
Independent	Neil Campbell (incumbent)	6.29%	91	91.5	92.5						
Independent	Jackie MacKay (incumbent)	6.15%	89	89.8	95.8	108.1	108.8	123.2			
Labour	Kevin Paterson	2.77%	40	40.2							
Electorate: 2,986 Valid: 1,446 Spoilt: 25 Quota: 290 Turnout: 1,471 (48.42)%

=== Loch a Tuath ===
- 2007: 3xIndependent
- 2012: 2xIndependent; 1xSNP
- 2007–2012 change: SNP gain one seat from Independent

Loch a Tuath – 3 seats
Party	Candidate	FPv%	Count			
Party	Candidate	FPv%	1	2	3	4
Independent	Donald Finlayson Crichton	28.0%	331			
SNP	John A. MacIver (incumbent)	24.53%	290	298.4		
Independent	Catriona Stewart (incumbent)	23.88%	273	282.5	283.1	333.1
Independent	Kenneth MacIver (incumbent)	14.47%	171	177.9	178.5	201.8
Independent	Alasdair Nicholson	9.9%	117	122.1	122.7	
Electorate: 2,166 Valid: 1,182 Spoilt: 17 Quota: 296 Turnout: 1,199 (54.57%)

=== An Taobh Siar agus Nis ===
- 2007: 4xIndependent
- 2012: 3xIndependent; 1xSNP
- 2007–2012 change: SNP gain one seat from Independent

An Taobh Siar agus Nis – 4 seats
Party	Candidate	FPv%	Count	
Party	Candidate	FPv%	1	2
Independent	Iain Morrison (incumbent)††††	24.18%	354	
Independent	John MacKay (incumbent)	21.17%	310	
SNP	Kenneth MacLeod	20.36%	298	
Independent	Kenneth MacLeod Murray (incumbent) ††	19.74%	289	316.4
Independent	Alastair MacLennan	8.13%	119	128.3
Independent	Alastair Dunlop	6.42%	94	103.3
Electorate: 2,599 Valid: 1,464 Spoilt: 21 Quota: 293 Turnout: 1,485 (56.34%)

== Changes since election ==
- † Sgir' Uige Agus Ceann A Tuath Nan Loch SNP Cllr Bill Houston died on 15 September 2012. A by-election was held on 29 November 2012 and was won by the Independent Angus MacDonald Morrison.
- †† Sgir' An Taobh Siar agus Nis Independent Cllr Kenneth MacLeod Murray died on 23 December 2014. A by-election was to be held to fill the vacancy on 12 March 2015. Only Independent Alistair MacLennan was nominated and was deemed elected.
- ††† Beinn Na Foghla Agus Uibhist A Tuath Labour Cllr Archie K. McDonald resigned for health reasons on 25 January 2015. A by-election was held to fill the vacancy on 26 March 2015 and the seat was won by the Independent Andrew Walker.
- †††† Sgir' An Taobh Siar agus Nis Independent Cllr Iain Morrison died on 31 July 2015 after a battle with cancer. A by-election was held to fill the vacancy on 7 October 2015 and was won by the Independent John MacLeod.

== By-elections since 2012 ==
Sgir’ Uige Agus Ceann A Tuath Nan Loch By-election (29 November 2012) – 1 Seat
Party	Candidate	FPv%	Count
Party	Candidate	FPv%	1
Independent	Angus MacDonald Morrison	73.47	745
SNP	John Norman MacDonald	19.23	195
Independent	Les Mac An Ultaigh	7.2	73
Valid: 1,014 Spoilt: 14 Quota: 508 Turnout: 1,028

Beinn Na Faoghla Agus Uibhist A Tuath (26 March 2015) – 1 Seat
Party	Candidate	FPv%	Count
Party	Candidate	FPv%	1
Independent	Andrew Walker	59.1	437
SNP	Roslyn Macpherson	40.9	302
Valid: 739

An Taobh Siar agus Nis By-election (7 October 2015) – 1 Seat
Party	Candidate	FPv%	Count
Party	Candidate	FPv%	1
Independent	John Norman MacLeod	86.9%	886
Independent	Richard Froggatt	7.4%	75
Green	Gavin MacLeod Humphreys	5.8%	59
Valid: 1,020 Quota: 511 Turnout: (39.8%)

== Ward areas in English ==
- Barraigh, Bhatarsaigh, Eirisgeigh agus Uibhist a Deas: Barra, Vatersay, Eriskay and South Uist
- Beinn Na Foghla agus Uibhist a Tuath: Benbecula and North Uist
- Na Hearadh agus Ceann a Deas Nan Loch: Harris and South Lewis
- Sgir' Uige agus Ceann a Tuath Nan Loch: Mid Lewis
- Sgire an Rubha: Eye Peninsula
- Steòrnabhagh a Deas: Stornoway South
- Steòrnabhagh a Tuath: Stornoway North
- Loch a Tuath: Broad Bay
- An Taobh Siar agus Nis: North West Lewis
