= 2025 Hamilton, Larkhall and Stonehouse by-election =

Scottish Parliament by-election

- 5 June 2025

Hamilton, Larkhall and Stonehouse constituency
- Turnout: 44.2% (▼16.5 pp)
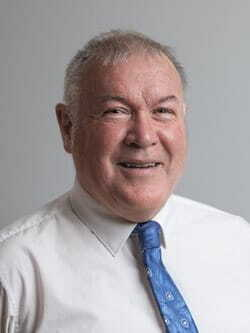
	First party	Second party
Candidate	Davy Russell	Katy Loudon
Party	Labour	SNP
Popular vote	8,559	7,957
Percentage	31.6%	29.4%
Swing	▼2.0 pp	▼16.8 pp
	Third party	Fourth party
Candidate	Ross Lambie	Richard Nelson
Party	Reform	Conservative
Popular vote	7,088	1,621
Percentage	26.1%	6.0%
Swing	New	▼11.5 pp
MSP before election
Christina McKelvie
SNP
Elected MSP
Davy Russell
Labour

The 2025 Hamilton, Larkhall and Stonehouse by-election was held on 5 June 2025 to elect a member of the Scottish Parliament (MSP) for Hamilton, Larkhall and Stonehouse, one of nine constituencies in the Central Scotland electoral region. It was triggered by the death of the incumbent, Christina McKelvie of the Scottish National Party (SNP), on 27 March 2025.

The Scottish Labour candidate, Davy Russell, won with 8,559 votes (31.6%). In second-place was the SNP candidate, Katy Loudon, with 7,957 votes (29.4%). This gave Scottish Labour a majority of 602 votes over the SNP. 27,155 votes were verified out of a total electorate in the constituency of 61,485, resulting in a turnout of 44.2%, down from 60.7% in the constituency in the last election there in 2021.

== Background ==
The seat was first contested in the 2011 Scottish Parliament election, when it was won by McKelvie, who was returned at the 2016 and 2021 elections. On 10 March 2025 she announced she intended to stand down at the upcoming 2026 election due to her ongoing treatment for cancer. Her death on 27 March 2025 triggered the by-election.

== Candidates ==
Ten candidates stood. The Alba Party said that, out of respect for McKelvie's contribution to the Scottish independence movement and her work as an MSP, they would not field a candidate.

Nominations closed on 1 May.

=== Scottish National Party ===
On 14 April a South Lanarkshire councillor, Katy Loudon, was announced as the SNP candidate. She had previously unsuccessfully stood in the 2023 Rutherglen and Hamilton West by-election and in Rutherglen at the 2024 general election.

=== Scottish Labour ===
It was initially reported that the MSP Monica Lennon and Gavin Keatt, a councillor for Hamilton South, were considered for Scottish Labour's candidacy for the by-election. On 16 April Labour announced the businessman Davy Russell as their candidate. He beat the former MSP Alasdair Morrison and a local government manager named Suzanne Macleod in a selection contest.

=== Scottish Conservatives ===
Richard Nelson, a South Lanarkshire councillor and comedian, was announced as the Scottish Conservatives' candidate. He represents Larkhall ward on South Lanarkshire Council. He stood for them in Hamilton and Clyde Valley at the 2024 general election.

=== Reform UK ===
Reform UK announced that Ross Lambie, a councillor in South Lanarkshire for Clydesdale South who recently joined the party in March after defecting from the Scottish Conservatives, would be their candidate. He stood for the Conservatives in East Kilbride and Strathaven at the 2024 general election.

=== Scottish Liberal Democrats ===
The Scottish Liberal Democrats candidate was Aisha Mir, a businesswoman. She had previously stood for them in a number of locations, including Mid Scotland and Fife at the 2021 Scottish Parliament election and East Kilbride and Strathaven at the 2024 general election.

=== UK Independence Party ===
The UK Independence Party (UKIP) candidate was Janice Mackay. She was a candidate for Rutherglen and Hamilton West at the 2015 and 2019 general elections. She was also a candidate in the Stone, Great Wyrley and Penkridge constituency at the 2024 general election.

=== Scottish Greens ===
On 29 April the Scottish Greens announced that their candidate would be Ann McGuinness, a board of directors member for Scottish Rural Action. She stood for them in East Kilbride and Strathaven at the 2024 general election.

=== Scottish Socialist Party ===
The Scottish Socialist Party's candidate was Collette Bradley, a trade union activist and member of the support staff for further education colleges in Lanarkshire. Bradley campaigned on the subjects of improved pay, equality and job security. She promised to take only an average worker's wage if elected, rejecting the MSP salary of £74,507.

=== Other candidates ===
Andy Brady stood for the Scottish Family Party, while a pizza shop owner named Marc Wilkinson stood as an independent candidate. Wilkinson also stated his intention to create the "South of Scotland People Party" for the 2026 Scottish Parliament election.

== Campaign ==
On 22 May 2025 Reform UK were accused of "blatant racism" by Labour over an online political advertisement which said that Anas Sarwar, the leader of the Scottish Labour Party, would "prioritise the Pakistani community". Both Labour and the SNP asked Meta Platforms to remove it from their social media platforms. Nigel Farage, the leader of Reform UK, rejected the accusation and accused Sarwar of introducing "sectarianism" into Scottish politics. Senior figures from Reform UK and the SNP suggested that Reform could overtake Labour and achieve second place behind the SNP. Reform UK hoped to achieve a "tartan bounce" in Scottish support after coming first at the 2025 United Kingdom local elections, having previously polled weaker results in Scottish elections.

John Swinney, the leader of the SNP, referred to it as both a "three-way contest" and a "straight contest" between Reform and the SNP while Reform UK's deputy leader, Richard Tice, also claimed it would be a race between the SNP and Reform. Journalists, public-opinion researchers and campaigners from the contesting parties suggested that Reform UK may benefit from "scunnered" voters who were disappointed with the record of Conservative, Labour and SNP governments both nationally and in the Scottish Parliament.

== Results ==
2025 Scottish Parliament by-election: Hamilton, Larkhall and Stonehouse
Party	Candidate	Votes	%	±%
Labour	Davy Russell	8,559	31.6	▼2.0
SNP	Katy Loudon	7,957	29.4	▼16.8
Reform	Ross Lambie	7,088	26.1	New
Conservative	Richard Nelson	1,621	6.0	▼11.5
Green	Ann McGuinness	695	2.6	New
Liberal Democrats	Aisha Jawaid Mir	533	2.0	▼0.8
Scottish Socialist	Collette Bradley	278	1.0	New
Scottish Family	Andy Brady	219	0.8	New
Independent	Marc Wilkinson	109	0.4	New
UKIP	Janice Elizabeth Mackay	50	0.2	New
Rejected ballots		46	0.2	
Majority		602	2.2	N/A
Registered electors		61,485		N/A
Turnout		27,155	44.2	▼16.5
Labour gain from SNP		Swing	▲7.4	

== Aftermath and analysis ==
Media outlets such as the BBC, Sky News and Reuters described the result as a "shock defeat" for the SNP and a "surprise victory" and "confounded expectations" for Labour since the SNP were widely predicted to retain the seat with Reform UK finishing second. Reform UK saw their strongest result to date in a Scottish election and argued that Scottish politics was now a "three-horse race" due to polling a close third place behind the SNP, while journalists Glenn Campbell and Iain Macwhirter and political scientist John Curtice wrote that Reform had now established itself as a presence in Scottish politics. The following year at the 2026 Scottish Parliament election, Russell was unseated by Alex Kerr, who regained the constituency for the SNP.

== Previous result ==
2021 Scottish Parliament election: Hamilton, Larkhall and Stonehouse
Party	Candidate	Votes	%	±%
SNP	Christina McKelvie	16,761	46.2	−2.1
Labour	Monica Lennon	12,179	33.6	+4.1
Conservative	Meghan Gallacher	6,332	17.5	−1.9
Liberal Democrats	Mark McGeever	1,012	2.8	−0.1
Majority		4,582	12.6	−6.1
Turnout		36,420	60.9	+10.6
SNP hold		Swing	–6.2	

== See also ==
- List of by-elections to the Scottish Parliament
