= Motherwell College =

Academic institution in North Lanarkshire, Scotland

Coordinates: 55.783584°N 3.967545°W

New College Lanarkshire Motherwell Campus
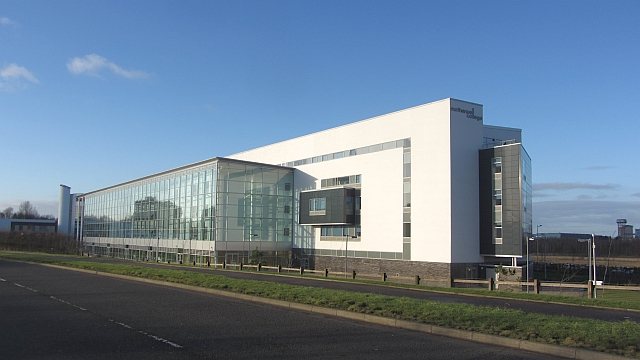
- The main building of the modern College
- Type: Further education
- Established: 1967, Renamed 1 November 2013
- Principal: Professor Christopher M Moore
- Administrative staff: Unknown
- Students: 20,000
- Location: Ravenscraig, Scotland
- Website: http://www.nclanarkshire.ac.uk/

New College Lanarkshire Motherwell Campus is a further education college located in the Ravenscraig area of Motherwell, North Lanarkshire, Scotland. An independent institution from 1967, in 2013 it merged with Cumbernauld College to form New College Lanarkshire.

== History ==
Originally sited next to Our Lady's High School and Fir Park Stadium in Motherwell, the original building has since been demolished for redevelopment as a housing estate.

The college moved into a new campus in August 2009, which is located 1 kilometre (0.62 mi) from the old site. It was officially opened in January 2010 by the Princess Royal.

The campus is fully equipped, and has an on-site nursery. There are two librarys/learning centres which members of the public can use on a drop in basis.

== Courses at the College ==
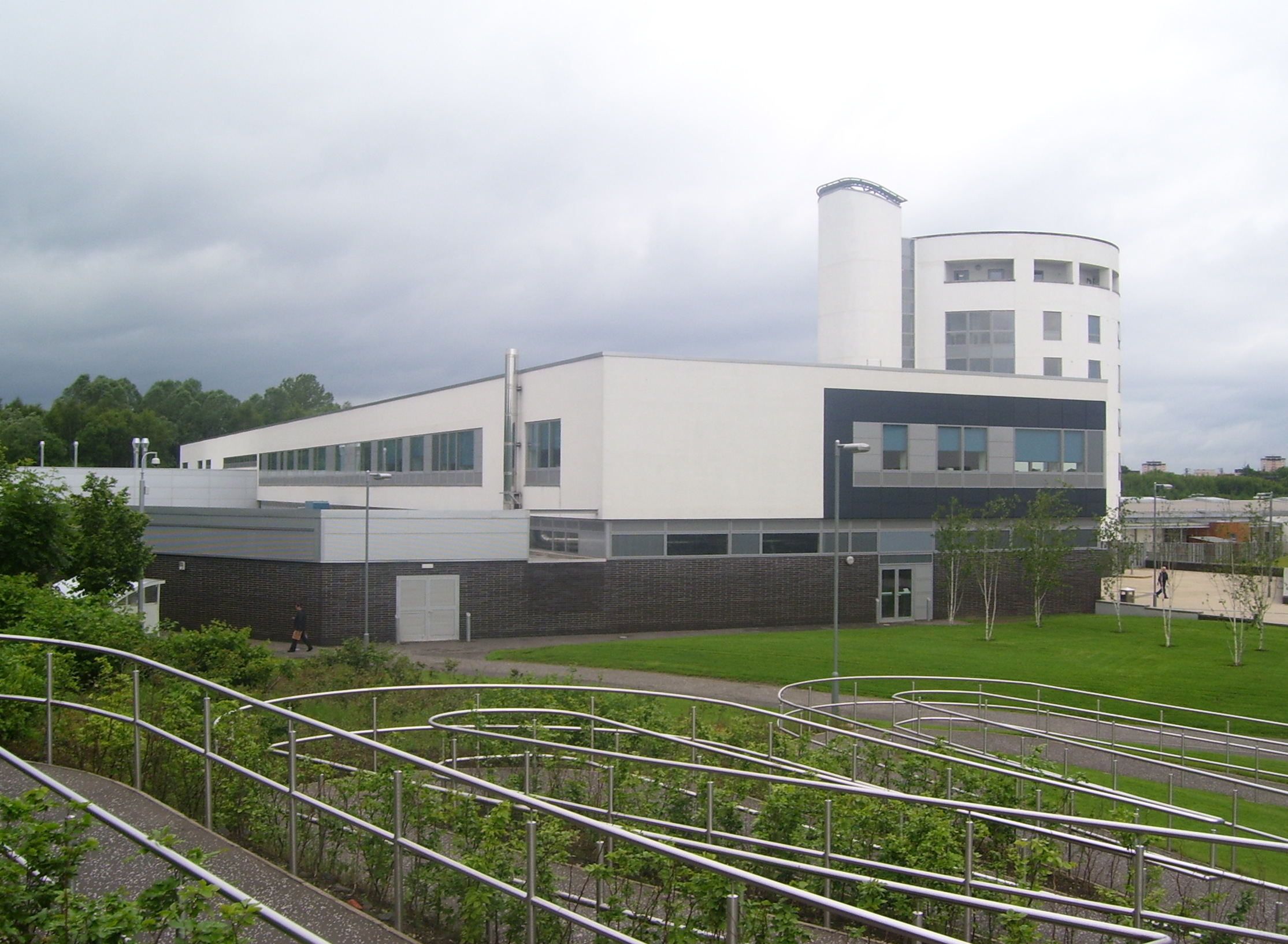
The engineering and student accommodation buildings

A number of courses are available in the following subject areas, on both a full and part-time basis:

- Animation, Design and Media
- Automotive Studies
- Beauty & Complementary Therapies
- Business and Management
- Computing & Information Technology
- Construction
- Education
- Engineering
- Hairdressing & Make-up Artistry
- Health
- Health & Safety
- Highers/Intermediates
- Hospitality
- International Baccalaureate Diploma Programme
- Languages
- Performing Arts
- Photography
- Professional Cookery
- Social Care
- Social Sciences
- Sport and Fitness
- Supported Learning Programmes
- Travel and Tourism

== Notable alumni ==
- Kate Bracken
- Frank Roy
- Midge Ure
- Karen Fishwick
- Lewis Capaldi
- Davy Russell, politician
