= Quarter, South Lanarkshire =

Coordinates: 55°44′18″N 4°01′52″W

Quarter: Scottish Gaelic: An Ceathramh
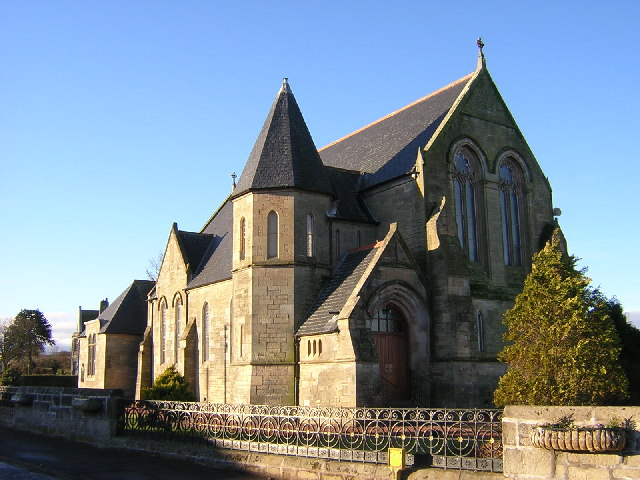

- Location within South Lanarkshire
- Population: 750 (2020)
- OS grid reference: NS724513
- Council area: South Lanarkshire
- Lieutenancy area: Lanarkshire
- Country: Scotland
- Sovereign state: United Kingdom
- Post town: HAMILTON
- Postcode district: ML3
- Police: Scotland
- Fire: Scottish
- Ambulance: Scottish
- UK Parliament: Lanark and Hamilton East
- Scottish Parliament: Hamilton, Larkhall and Stonehouse

Quarter is a village in South Lanarkshire, Scotland, on the hill above the Clyde Valley. The village is south of Eddlewood, Hamilton connected by carscallan road. To the west is the town Larkhall.

== History ==
Francis Groome described the village in 1884 thus:

"Quarter Ironworks and Darngaber, a conjoint village in Hamilton parish, Lanarkshire, 3 miles [5 km] S of Hamilton town and 1/2 mile [1 km] ENE of Quarter Road station on the Strathaven branch of the Caledonian railway. It has a post office (Quarter) under Hamilton, an Established chapel of ease, a public school, and iron-works with five blast furnaces. The chapel of ease is an Early Decorated edifice of 1884, containing 430 sittings. Pop. (1871) 544, (1881) 886.—Ord. Sur., sh. 23, 1865."

=== Coal Mine ===
The coal mine at Quarter belonged to the Duke of Hamilton. On 16 March 1841 there was a fatal accident arising because of an underground explosion. The seven workers (one a boy) underground at the time died instantaneously. Four other workers died while trying to rescue them. In his teens the labour activist Keir Hardie worked as a pony driver and then as a hewer here.

=== Ironworks ===
The Quarter Ironworks were established in 1865 and remained open until 1885. In 1880 they had five blast furnaces.

== Church ==
The parish church was built in 1884. From 30 September 1956, the church was linked with Hamilton: West. Later it was linked with Hamilton: South. During the autumn of 2025, the congregations of Quarter, Hamilton: South, Hamilton: Trinity and Hamilton: Cadzow were united into one parish. The Quarter Church building (and Hamilton: Cadzow) were closed as part of the Union.

== Notable residents ==
- Davy Russell, politician
