= Uibhist a Tuath (ward) =

Electoral ward in the Outer Hebrides, Scotland

- Na h-Eileanan Siar
- Boundary of Uibhist a Tuath in .
- Population: 1,616 (2021)
- Electorate: 1,360 (2022)
- Major settlements: Lochmaddy
- Scottish Parliament constituency: Na h-Eileanan an Iar
- Scottish Parliament region: Highlands and Islands
- UK Parliament constituency: Na h-Eileanan an Iar

Current ward
- Created: 2022
- Number of councillors: 2
- Councillor: Mustapha Hocine (Independent)
- Councillor: Uisdean Robertson (Independent)
- Created from: Beinn na Foghla agus Uibhist a Tuath

Uibhist a Tuath (Scottish Gaelic for 'North Uist') [ˈɯː.ɪʃtʲ ə ˈt̪ʰuə] is one of the 11 wards of Comhairle nan Eilean Siar (Scottish Gaelic for 'Council of the Western Isles'). Created in 2022, the ward elects two councillors using the single transferable vote electoral system and covers an area with a population of 1,616 people.

== Boundaries ==
The ward was created following the 2019 Reviews of Electoral Arrangements which were instigated following the implementation of the Islands (Scotland) Act 2018. The act allowed for the creation of single- and dual-member wards to allow for better representation of island areas. Uibhist a Tuath was formed from the previous Beinn na Foghla agus Uibhist a Tuath ward. The ward is centred around the island of North Uist in the middle of the Outer Hebrides archipelago and includes the isle of Berneray and a number of uninhabited islands including Boreray and Tahay in the Sound of Harris and the remote, uninhabited island of St Kilda in the Atlantic Ocean.

== Councillors ==
Election	Councillors	
2022	Mustapha Hocine (Independent)	Uisdean Robertson (Independent)

== Election results ==
=== 2022 election ===
Uibhist a Tuath – 2 seats
Party	Candidate	FPv%	Count
Party	Candidate	FPv%	1
Independent	Mustapha Hocine	41.8	276
Independent	Uisdean Robertson (Note: Sitting councillor for Beinn na Faoghla agus Uibhist a Tuath.)	38.4	254
Conservative	Kenny Barker	19.8	131
Electorate: 1,360 Valid: 661 Spoilt: 8 Quota: 221 Turnout: 49.2%
