= Barraigh, Bhatarsaigh, Eirisgeigh agus Uibhist a Deas (ward) =

Electoral ward in Outer Hebrides, Scotland

- Na h-Eileanan Siar
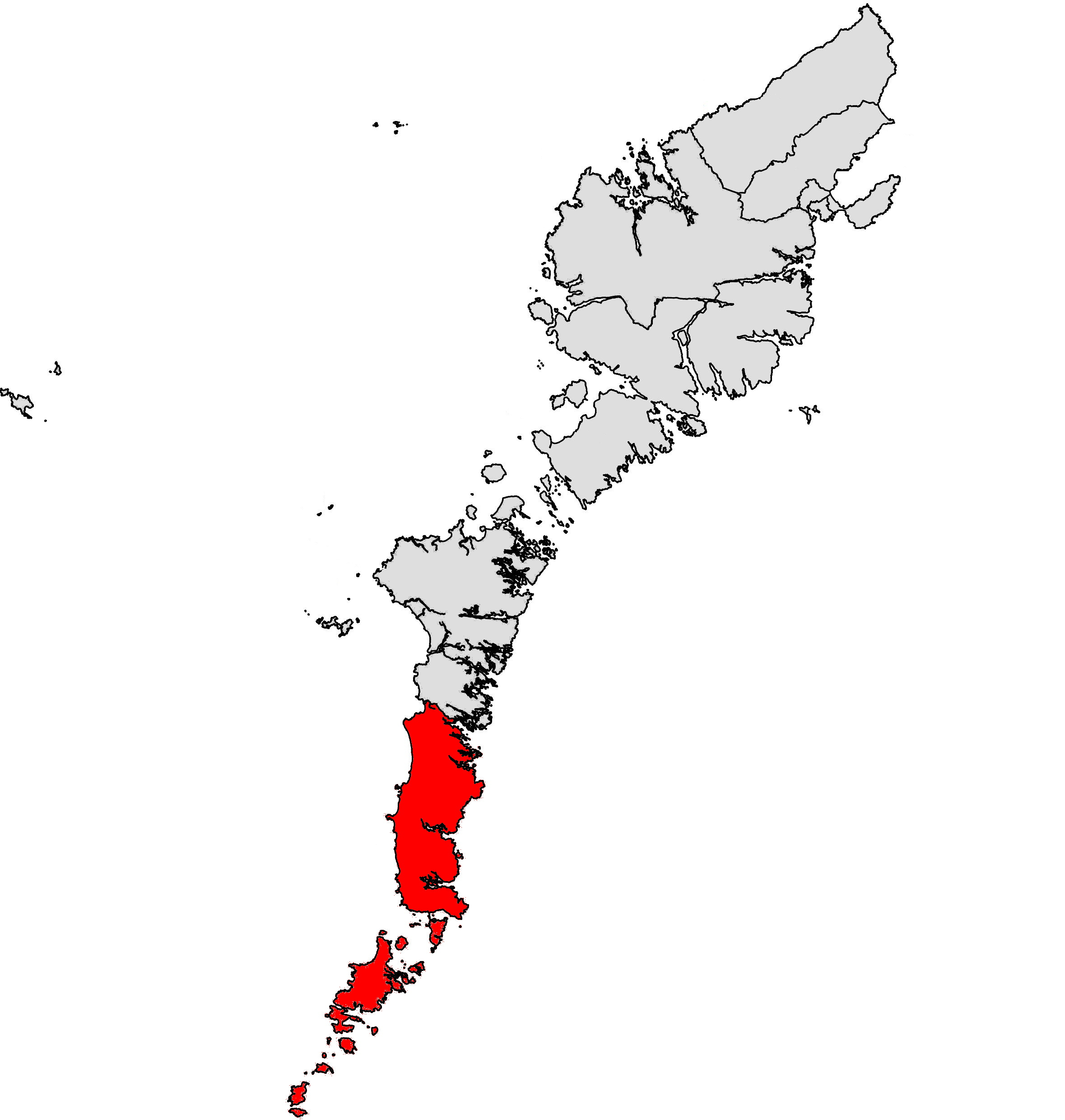
- Boundary of Barraigh, Bhatarsaigh, Eirisgeigh agus Uibhist a Deas in Na h-Eileanan Siar from 2007–2022.
- Electorate: 2,506 (2017)
- Major settlements: Castlebay; Lochboisdale
- Scottish Parliament constituency: Na h-Eileanan an Iar
- Scottish Parliament region: Highlands and Islands
- UK Parliament constituency: Na h-Eileanan an Iar

2007–2022
- Number of councillors: 4
- Replaced by: Barraigh agus Bhatarsaigh; Uibhist a Deas, Èirisgeigh agus Beinn na Faoghla
- Created from: Barra and Vatersay; Daliburgh and Eriskay; Eochar; Loch Eynort

Barraigh, Bhatarsaigh, Eirisgeigh agus Uibhist a Deas (Scottish Gaelic for 'Barra, Vatersay, Eriskay and South Uist') was one of the nine wards of Comhairle nan Eilean Siar (Scottish Gaelic for 'Council of the Western Isles'). Created in 2007, the ward elected four councillors using the single transferable vote electoral system. As a result of the Islands (Scotland) Act 2018, the ward was abolished in 2022.

Independents have dominated elections in the Western Isles and half of the councillors elected in the area had no party affiliation. However, the Scottish National Party (SNP) also held half the seats at the 2007 and 2017 elections.

== Boundaries ==
The ward was created following the Fourth Statutory Reviews of Electoral Arrangements ahead of the 2007 Scottish local elections. As a result of the Local Governance (Scotland) Act 2004, local elections in Scotland would use the single transferable vote electoral system from 2007 onwards so Barraigh, Bhatarsaigh, Eirisgeigh agus Uibhist a Deas was formed from an amalgamation of several previous first-past-the-post wards. It contained all of the former Barra and Vatersay, Daliburgh and Eriskay and Loch Eynort wards as well as the southern half of the former Eochar ward. The ward centred around the islands in the south of the Outer Hebrides and included Barra, Vatersay, South Uist and Eriskay as well as a number of uninhabited surrounding islands. Proposals in the Fifth Statutory Reviews of Electoral Arrangements ahead of the 2017 Scottish local elections would have seen the ward's boundaries unchanged but reduced from a four-member ward to a three-member ward. However, these were not adopted by Scottish ministers as plans for the Islands (Scotland) Act 2018 would bring forward an interim review following the 2017 elections.

The Islands (Scotland) Act 2018 allowed for the creation of single- and dual-member wards to allow for better representation of island areas. As a result, the ward was abolished and replaced by the smaller Barraigh agus Bhatarsaigh and Uibhist a Deas, Èirisgeigh agus Beinn na Faoghla wards.

== Councillors ==
Election	Councillors			
2007	David Blaney (Independent)	Peter Carlin (Independent)	Donald Manford (SNP)	Gerry MacLeod (SNP)
2012	David Blaney (Independent)	Donnie Steele (Independent)	Donald Manford (SNP)	Ronald Joseph MacKinnon (Labour)
2017	Paul Steele (Independent)	Iain MacNeil (Independent)	Donald Manford (SNP)	Calum MacMillan (SNP/ Alba)
2021	Paul Steele (Independent)	Iain MacNeil (Independent)	Donald Manford (SNP)	Calum MacMillan (SNP/ Alba)

== Election results ==
=== 2017 election ===
Barraigh, Bhatarsaigh, Eirisgeigh agus Uibhist a Deas – 4 seats
Party	Candidate	FPv%	Count							
Party	Candidate	FPv%	1	2	3	4	5	6	7	8
SNP	Donald Manford (incumbent)	38.3	531							
SNP	Calum MacMillan	10.0	138	278						
Independent	Iain MacNeil	15.7	217	240	240	246	264	290		
Independent	Paul Steele	11.6	161	170	170	172	192	253	258	324
Independent	David Blaney (incumbent)	8.1	112	121	121	129	155	175	177	
Independent	Donnie Steele (incumbent)	7.9	110	129	129	132	155			
Independent	Ronald MacKinnon (incumbent)	6.4	89	101	101	109				
Independent	Gerry MacLeod	2.09	29	30	30					
Electorate: 2,506 Valid: 1,387 Spoilt: 44 Quota: 278 Turnout: 57.1%

=== 2012 election ===
2012 Comhairle nan Eilean Siar election

Barraigh, Bhatarsaigh, Eirisgeigh agus Uibhist a Deas - 4 seats
Party	Candidate	FPv%	Count									
Party	Candidate	FPv%	1	2	3	4	5	6	7	8	9	10
SNP	Donald Manford (incumbent)	37.43%	521									
Labour	Ronald Joseph MacKinnon	15.09%	210	226.3	228.7	234.7	242.8	263.8	292.6			
Independent	Donnie Steele	9.41%	131	142.6	144.6	150.6	155.9	179.4	200.8	204.1	222.2	263.6
Independent	Calum MacMillan	8.84%	123	144.4	147.8	150.3	152.2	156.2	165.2	166.5	192.9	
Independent	David Blaney (incumbent)	8.48%	118	135.2	139.2	142.2	147.7	157.6	183.8	185.9	201.3	247.9
Independent	Peter Carlin (incumbent)	6.47%	90	103	105	106	108.4	114.4				
Independent	Calum MacAulay	5.17%	72	76.2	76.2	77.2	81.1					
SNP	Gerry MacLeod (incumbent)	3.95%	55	135.8	135.8	135.8	143.5	146.5	154.3	155.1		
Independent	Allan MacLeod	2.01%	28	51.7	52.7	53.2						
Independent	Angus MacDonald	1.94%	27	27.9	27.9							
Independent	Eric Wallis	1.22%	17	17.9								
Electorate: 2,510 Valid: 1,392 Spoilt: 30 Quota: 279 Turnout: 1,424 (55.46)%

=== 2007 election ===
2007 Comhairle nan Eilean Siar election

Comhairle nan Eilean Siar election, 2007: Barraigh, Bhatarsaigh Eirisgeigh Agus Uibhist A Deas
Party	Candidate	FPv%	%	Seat	Count
SNP	Donald Manford	723	49.0	1	1
Independent	David Blaney	233	15.8	4	4
Independent	Peter Carlin	177	12.0	3	4
Labour	Ronald Joseph MacKinnon	162	11.0		
SNP	Gerry MacLeod	125	8.5	2	4
Independent	Angus MacDonald	57	3.9		
