= Davy Russell (politician) =

Scottish politician

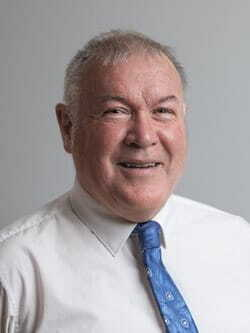
- Official portrait, 2025

Member of the Scottish Parliament for Hamilton, Larkhall and Stonehouse
- In office 5 June 2025 – 9 April 2026
- Preceded by: Christina McKelvie
- Succeeded by: Alex Kerr

Deputy Lieutenant of Lanarkshire
- In office 2 November 2018 – 5 June 2025
- Lord Lieutenant: Susan Haughey
- Preceded by: Gavin Whitefield
- Succeeded by: Laura-Ann Currie

Personal details
- Born: 1962 (age 63–64) Quarter, South Lanarkshire, Scotland
- Party: Scottish Labour
- Education: Hamilton Grammar School
- Alma mater: Motherwell Technical College

David Russell (born 1962) (Note: Sources differ on Russell's age and there are no known sources for his date of birth. The Times reported that he was 67 years old as of 6 June 2025, while BBC News and The Herald reported that he was 63.) is a Scottish Labour politician and former engineer who served as the member of the Scottish Parliament (MSP) for Hamilton, Larkhall and Stonehouse from 2025 to 2026. He previously served as the deputy lieutenant of Lanarkshire from 2018 to 2025.

Born in the former mining village of Quarter, South Lanarkshire, Russell had a working class upbringing and attended Hamilton Grammar School and Motherwell Technical College, where he qualified in civil engineering. He spent over 40 years as a roads engineer at Glasgow City Council and from 2018 to 2025 served as Deputy Lieutenant of Lanarkshire under Susan Haughey. After the death of Christina McKelvie, he stood for Scottish Labour in the 2025 Hamilton, Larkhall and Stonehouse by-election, winning the seat from the Scottish National Party. The SNP regained the seat in the 2026 Scottish Parliament election.

== Early life and career ==
David Russell was born in 1962 in the mining village of Quarter, South Lanarkshire, where he grew up working class. He attended Quarter Primary School and Hamilton Grammar School, also spending time working a weekend job at his local farm, before attending Motherwell Technical College where he attained a certificate in civil engineering.

After receiving his certificate in civil engineering, Russell undertook an apprenticeship in civil engineering and roadworks at Strathclyde Regional Council's roads department. He was later transferred to Glasgow City Council, where he served in different positions as a senior manager and roads engineer for over 40 years. At the time of his retirement, he served as the council's director of operational services, managing roads, transport, parks and waste services. In the same period, Russell served as a director at Clyde Valley Developments Limited, a hotel operator which was liquidated in 2015, and Ptarmigan Estates, which was acquired as a shelf company from an Edinburgh-based corporate services provider.

From November 2018 until his election to the Scottish Parliament in June 2025, Russell served as the deputy lieutenant of Lanarkshire under Susan Haughey. At this time, he was a member of the Chartered Institution of Wastes Management. In early 2025, he became a part-time consultant to a subsidiary of Mears Group in North Lanarkshire.

== Political career ==
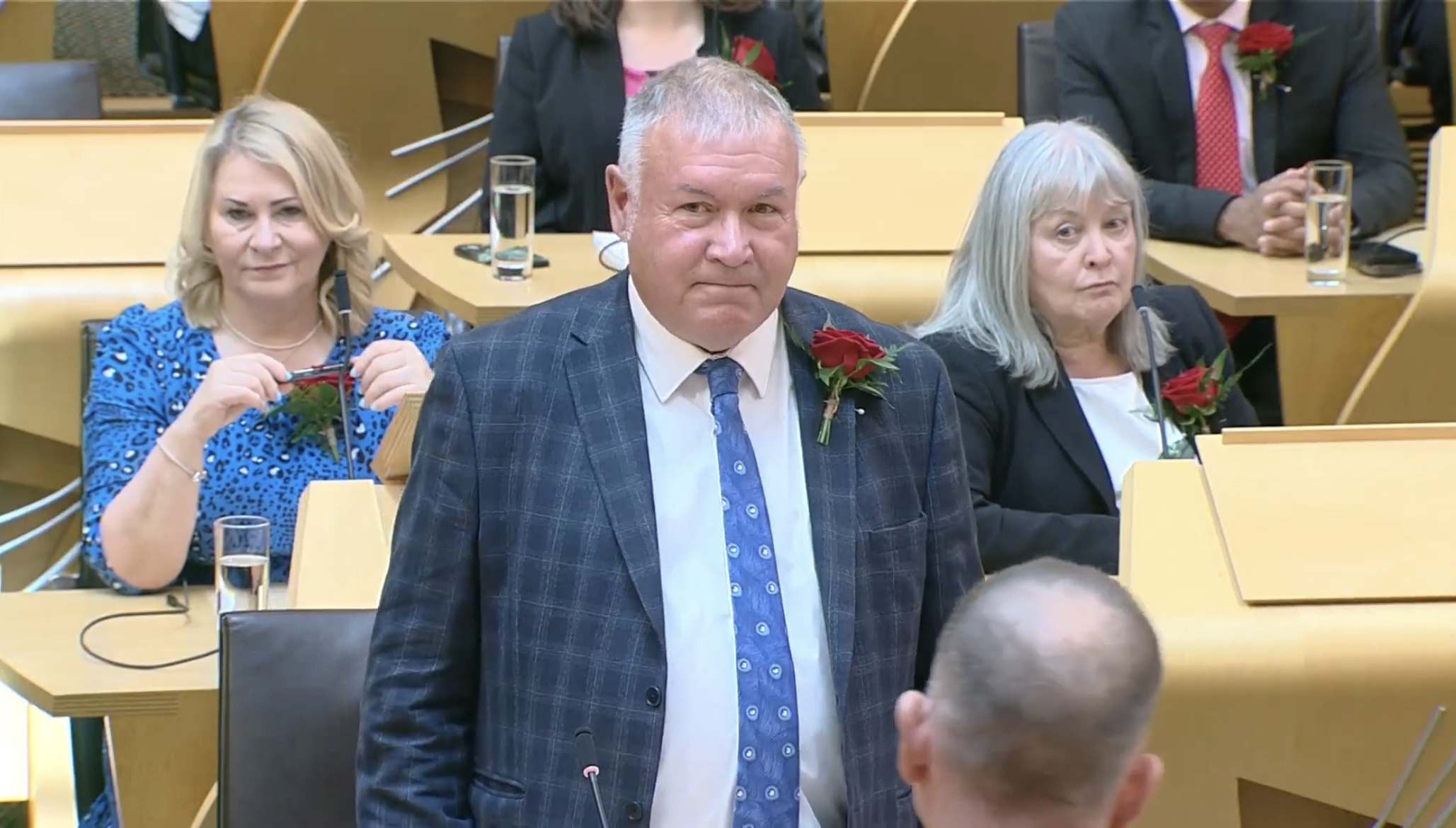
Russell in the Scottish Parliament in 2025

In April 2025, Russell became Scottish Labour's candidate for the 2025 Hamilton, Larkhall and Stonehouse by-election. Local Labour sources said that Russell was narrowly selected as their candidate for the election by just two votes ahead of Suzanne Macleod, a member of Labour's Scottish Executive Committee. The outcome was attributed to former MSP Alasdair Morrison encouraging members at the final selection meeting to support Russell instead of himself.

Russell avoided live broadcast interviews during the campaign and did not appear on BBC Radio Scotland, unlike other candidates. He faced criticism for his low profile from his opponents and political commentators, particularly after skipping the STV by-election debate. He was branded the "invisible man" by Reform UK candidate Ross Lambie in a video parodying his absence where he pretended to search for him to the soundtrack of "The Invisible Man" by Queen. Russell said that he "would rather spend [his] time chapping doors" with Anas Sarwar stating that he was a victim of "elitism and classism".

In the 2026 Scottish Parliament election, Russell was unseated by Alex Kerr from the Scottish National Party.

== Personal life ==
Russell is a father and also has a grandson, Adam, to whom he dedicated his victory. He is a member of Eddlewood Bowling Club and plays there regularly. He is also a supporter of Rangers F.C. and a personal friend of former Rangers manager Barry Ferguson.

Russell is a volunteer member of the board of trustees for Sense Scotland, a charity for disabled people, and has also been involved in managing a local hospice.

== Notes ==
Scottish Parliament
Preceded by Christina McKelvie	Member of the Scottish Parliament for Hamilton, Larkhall and Stonehouse; 2025–2026	Succeeded by Alex Kerr
