= Frank Roy =

British politician

Frank Roy CBE

Lord Commissioner of the Treasury
- In office 5 May 2006 – 6 May 2010
- Prime Minister: Tony Blair; Gordon Brown
- Chancellor: Gordon Brown; Alistair Darling
- Preceded by: Tom Watson
- Succeeded by: Brooks Newmark

Member of Parliament for Motherwell and Wishaw
- In office 1 May 1997 – 30 March 2015
- Preceded by: Constituency Created
- Succeeded by: Marion Fellows

Personal details
- Born: 29 August 1958 (age 67) Motherwell, Lanarkshire, Scotland
- Party: Labour
- Spouse: Ellen Roy
- Children: 2
- Website: frankroy.org.uk

Francis Roy CBE (born 29 August 1958) is a former British Labour Party politician, who was the Member of Parliament (MP) for Motherwell and Wishaw from 1997 to 2015. He was a Government Whip and Lord Commissioner of HM Treasury from 2006 to 2010, after having served as an Assistant Whip from 2005.

== Early life ==
Roy was educated at Our Lady's High School, Motherwell, and later at Motherwell College (1992) and Glasgow Caledonian University in Consumer and Management Studies (1994).

Roy was, like many others in the area, a steelworker until he was made redundant in 1991 when Ravenscraig Steelworks closed. He describes the strikes of the 1980s as ensuring his "politicisation was cemented for life"

== Political career ==
Roy worked as a parliamentary assistant to Helen Liddell MP before becoming MP for Motherwell and Wishaw. He is the first MP born locally to represent Motherwell and Wishaw.

In 2001 Roy resigned as parliamentary private secretary to Helen Liddell in the wake of the cancellation of a visit to Carfin Grotto by Irish Taoiseach Bertie Ahern. Ahern was due to visit the grotto to open a memorial to victims of the Great Famine but the visit was cancelled due to Roy's advice of risk of possible sectarian violence, despite statements from Strathclyde Police that they did not consider the visit to be a security risk.

In 2015, Roy worked on Liz Kendall's unsuccessful bid for the Labour leadership.

He is the father of Brian Francis Roy, former general secretary of Scottish Labour.

Roy was appointed Commander of the Order of the British Empire (CBE) in the 2023 New Year Honours for political and public service.

Parliament of the United Kingdom
New constituency	Member of Parliament for Motherwell and Wishaw; 1997–2015	Succeeded by Marion Fellows
