= Scottish Family Party =

Conservative political party in Scotland

- Abbreviation: SFP
- Founder: Richard Lucas
- Leader: Richard Lucas
- Chairman: Leo Lanahan
- Founded: July 2017; 9 years ago
- Registered: 11 September 2017; 9 years ago
- Headquarters: 272 Bath Street; Glasgow; Scotland; G2 4JR
- Ideology: Christian right; Social conservatism; Anti-abortion; Anti-LGBT
- Political position: Right-wing
- Colours: Blue
- Scottish Parliament: 0 / 129
- Local government in Scotland: 0 / 1,227

Website
- scottishfamily.org

The Scottish Family Party (SFP) is a minor socially conservative political party in Scotland. It was formed in 2017 and is led by former UKIP member and registered teacher Richard Lucas.

When launched in 2017, the SFP said its "central goal" was to gain election to the Scottish Parliament and "to fill the void" left behind by the current parties and their abandoning of "Judeo-Christian-inspired values of traditional Western civilisation". According to party leader Richard Lucas, they intend to be the party "to confront the cosy Holyrood consensus, interrupting the monochrome virtue-signalling that currently passes for debate in many areas". It also aims to be "pro-family, pro-marriage, pro-life, pro-freedom of speech, anti-identity politics, that values the complementary contributions of men and women and recommends schools refocus on education instead of social engineering, radical gender ideology and political moulding".

The SFP contested their first seats in the 2019 UK general election, and also fielded candidates at the 2021 Scottish Parliament election and the 2022 Scottish local elections, but has never won any seats.

In 2026, the party introduced a chatbot to summarise its political views and measures it seeks to implement. The SFP ran candidates in the 2026 Scottish Parliament election, with "stable marriage" being the party's stated priority.

== Party ideology and policy ==
=== Family policy ===
The SFP believes that 'Strong families make for a strong nation' and has proposals to help families with their finances such as giving cash in lieu of free nursery provision to those families who chose to have one parent not work and look after their children. The party thinks that married couples should be assessed for income tax as a family rather than as individuals, with tax allowances fully transferable between each spouse.

The SFP argues in favour of more autonomy for families and demands "an end to the ignoring of underage sex". The party would seek to have illegal underage sexual relations acted against rather than ignored by the police. The SFP is against "vaguely defined" domestic abuse laws and believes people should be treated equally in this regardless of whether they are male or female. SFP recognises marriage as a "a solemn, lifelong commitment", and claims that "civil partnerships for heterosexual couples will further undermine the culture of marriage". The SFP does not support the use of NHS resources for any fertility-related treatment apart from for a man and woman in a long-term stable relationship.

The party opposes same-sex marriage and advocates heterosexual marriage as being necessary for stable family life.

In August 2017, Lucas was criticised for suggesting that the arguments used to justify same-sex marriage could equally be used to justify incest. Additionally, he denied allegations that he had posted a joke about the murder of Jo Cox shortly after her death, saying he had instead been criticising others who were seeking to use her murder as a reason to vote Remain.

In February 2021, having previously criticised Ruth Davidson in a YouTube broadcast for seeking to have a "fatherless child", the General Teaching Council for Scotland cleared Lucas of misconduct and allowed him to remain a registered teacher.

=== Opposition to abortion and assisted suicide ===
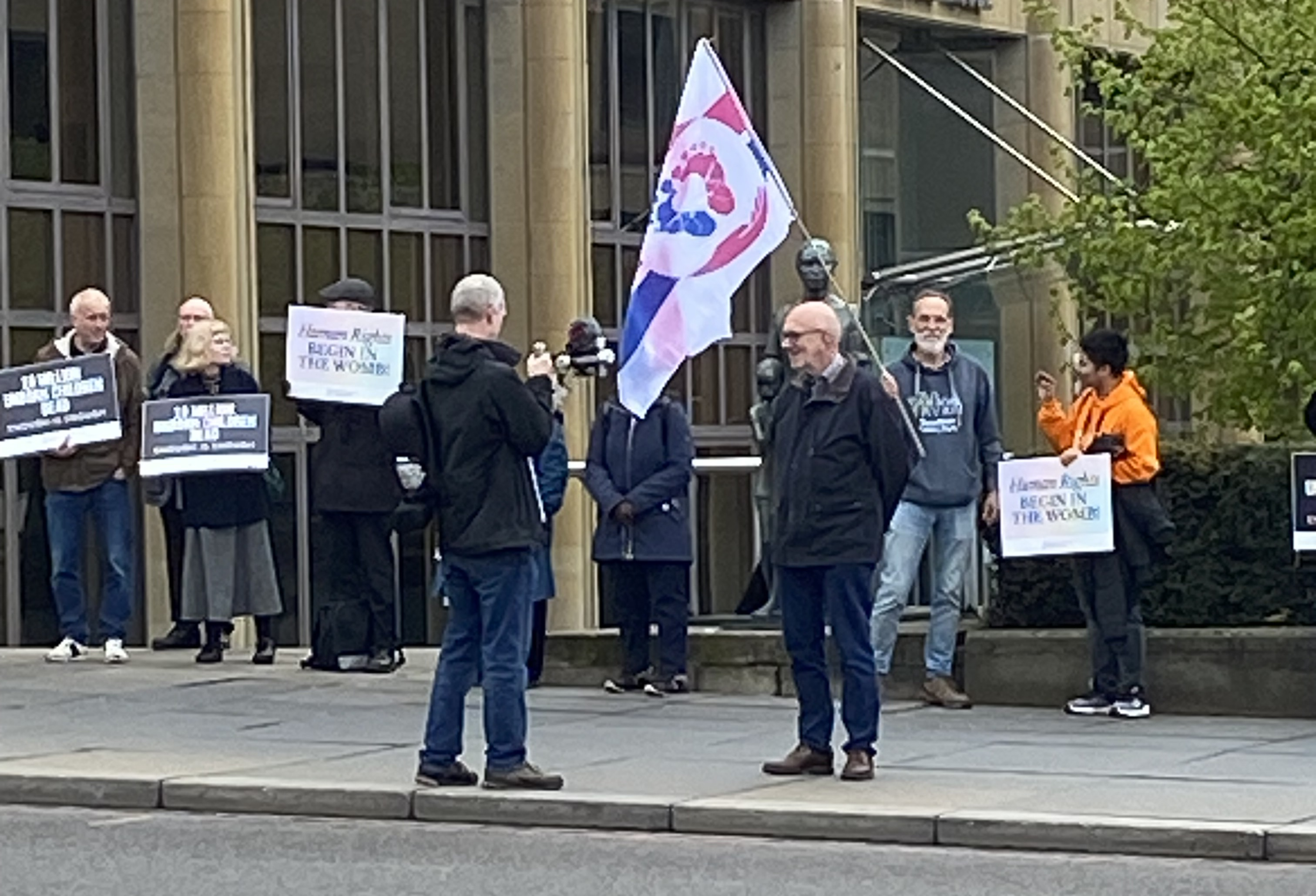
Richard Lucas (right) and deputy leader Phil Holden filming at a "pro-life chain" in April 2025

The SFP describes itself as pro-life, opposing both abortion and assisted suicide. The party wants to ban abortion except when the woman's life is in danger. During a protest at a sexual health clinic in Sandyford, Glasgow in March 2023, Lucas branded abortion providers at the clinic "killers". The party has also spread misinformation on the issue of abortion, such as in April 2026 by distributing flyers making an inaccurate claim about foetuses.

On 29 August 2022, the SFP tweeted a picture of Scottish First Minister Nicola Sturgeon outside Auschwitz, with a cartoon thought bubble reading: "There should have been a buffer zone around this place". Green MSP Gillian Mackay, responsible for the Act that created buffer zones around abortion clinics targeted by anti-abortion protesters, described the meme as "crass, insensitive and shameful" and that "even by [the SFP's] standards, this is appalling".

=== Education ===
The SFP believes that education should increase its focus on "traditional focuses" of "discipline, knowledge, formal teaching, and objective testing." They argue against the Curriculum for Excellence as it, "elevates subjective learner experience over teaching, undermining the intellectual authority of teachers, and uses student motivation and enjoyment as the measure of what is worth knowing".

Lucas has spoken out against rainbow flags being displayed in schools. The party is opposed to the inclusion of certain content in sex education such as LGBTQ-inclusive and pornographic topics. It supports education that includes the promotion of family planning and abstinence from alcohol use.

Lucas has also spoken about his opposition to LGBT+ teachers in schools and their presence around children, especially in regards to sexual health curriculum in schools. One teacher spoke to The National newspaper, linking SFP rhetoric to abuse of LGBT+ teachers and to incidents of teachers being called perverts or groomers in the street, abused as "paedophiles" over the phone, or in the case of some LGBT+ teachers, "forced out of the profession altogether".

In February 2020, the SFP submitted a complaint concerning a HappyFest event that celebrated LGBT+ arts (including drag, theatre, poetry, dance, and music) at Dunbar Grammar School in East Lothian, as part of LGBT History Month. The party claimed that the event promoted "a philosophy of gender fluidity that is confusing and dangerous to young people" and that "the drag scene is often associated with less than positive values". A spokesperson rejected the complaints, stating that the event was run "to raise awareness and challenge prejudice."

=== Other social issues ===
The SFP believes the gender pay gap is by and large a reflection of personal choices and the natural differences between men and women, and no government action is required to address it.

In October and December 2022, the party held protests at the Scottish Parliament opposing reform to the Gender Recognition Act.

SFP argued on its social media that "transgender ideology is damaging and confusing children". The party went further saying they would seek to repeal the new smacking ban legislation, since it believes that the previous legislation was adequate to protect children; and it opposes the UN Convention on the Rights of the Child, saying that it undermines the rights of parents. The SFP also opposes hate crime legislation.

=== Energy ===
The party calls targeting net-zero emissions "unrealistic" and "unhelpful". It says that "Scottish oil and gas industries can meet energy needs and contribute to our prosperity for many years to come".

=== Alliances with right-wing groups ===
In January 2023, The Ferret reported that SFP leader Richard Lucas was interviewed by Simon Crane, a prominent member of the far-right hate group Patriotic Alternative (PA) in Scotland. PA had been targeted by the UK government counter-terrorism strategy. Crane also interviewed SFP member and activist Niall Fraser. Lucas said Crane used to be a member of the Scottish Family Party (SFP), but left "after discussions with myself led him to the conclusion that PA reflected his ethno-nationalist political stance while the SFP did not". Lucas added that he takes "any opportunity to present the SFP to a new audience" and would "probably" speak to PA again.

In March 2023, PinkNews described the group as "far-right" due to plans to "brick up" the Sandyford Clinic in Glasgow in a protest against gender affirming care.

Fraser announced in late August 2023 that he would be contesting Margaret Ferrier's MP seat in Rutherglen and Hamilton West. According to the Daily Record, "Fraser appeared on a podcast by neo-Nazi group Homeland on which he described COVID-19 as "bogus" and said: "I didn't follow any lockdowns."

=== Foreign policy ===
The party says that it is neutral on the EU but respects the result of the 2016 United Kingdom European Union membership referendum.

The party wants Scotland to leave the European Court of Human Rights.

== Electoral history ==
=== 2019 general election ===
The SFP fielded two candidates in the 2019 United Kingdom general election: Liam McKechnie won 0.4% of the vote in Dunbartonshire East, and Richard Lucas won 0.7% of the vote in Ross, Skye & Lochaber.

==== Alleged breach of electoral law ====
According to The Ferret, Lucas was revealed on 27 July 2020 to have breached electoral law by failing to submit a record before the deadline of his personal campaign spending after running in the 2019 general election. While he had provided the necessary information to the Electoral Commission but not the local returning officer for the constituency he contested.

=== 2021 Scottish Parliament and 2022 local elections ===
The party contested the 2021 Scottish Parliament election. They then received 2,734 constituency votes and 16,085 list votes, but won no seats. It also contested the 2022 Scottish local elections, fielding 84 candidates and gaining 6,857 first-preference votes (0.4% of the total vote) but again winning no seats.

=== 2023 Rutherglen by-election and 2024 general election ===
Niall Fraser, who had previously stood as an All for Unity candidate at the 2021 Scottish Parliament election, ran as the SFP candidate in the 2023 Rutherglen and Hamilton West by-election. He polled 319 votes (1%), finishing seventh. According to Hope not Hate, Fraser "previously claimed he would “brick up” the entrance of a sexual health facility in Glasgow" and "was filmed abusing the then-First Minister Humza Yousaf at a Fringe event, shouting: “F*ck you. You are a pestilence on the land.”"

At the 2024 United Kingdom general election, the party fielded candidates in sixteen constituencies. Their best result was in Na h-Eileanan an Iar, finishing seventh with 2.9% of votes cast and beating the Liberal Democrats into eighth place. They received 5,425 votes in total, finishing 9th overall in vote share in Scotland.

=== 2025 Hamilton, Larkhall and Stonehouse by-election ===
Andy Brady was the Family Party candidate for the 2025 Hamilton, Larkhall and Stonehouse by-election, held due to the death of Christina McKelvie, an MSP for the SNP. He finished eighth with 0.8% of the vote.

=== United Kingdom House of Commons ===
| Election | Candidates | General | | Rank | Notes |
| Election | Candidates | Votes | % | Rank | Notes |
|---|---|---|---|---|---|
| 2019 | 2 | 465 | 0.001 | <48th in UK | Contested East Dunbartonshire and Ross, Skye and Lochaber. |
| 2024 | 16 | 5,425 | 0.018 | ▲34th in UK; 9th in Scotland | |

| Election | By-election | | Rank | Notes |
| Election | Votes | % | Rank | Notes |
|---|---|---|---|---|
| 2023 Rutherglen and Hamilton West by-election | 319 | 1.0 | 7th | 7th out of 14 candidates |

=== Scottish Parliament ===
| Election | Regional | | | Total seats | +/– | Rank | Government |
| Election | Votes | % | Seats | Total seats | +/– | Rank | Government |
|---|---|---|---|---|---|---|---|
| 2021 | 16,085 | 0.59 | 0 / 56 | 0 / 129 | | 9th | Not in parliament |
| 2026 | 17,136 | 0.74 | 0 / 56 | 0 / 129 | | 9th | Not in parliament |

| Election | By-election | | Rank | Notes |
| Election | Votes | % | Rank | Notes |
|---|---|---|---|---|
| 2025 Hamilton, Larkhall and Stonehouse by-election | 219 | 0.8 | 8th | 8th out of 10 candidates |

=== Local elections ===
| Election | Local | | Seats | Rank | Notes |
| Election | Votes | % | Seats | Rank | Notes |
|---|---|---|---|---|---|
| 2022 | 6,857 | 0.4 | 0 / 1,227 | 10th | |
