= Alex Kerr (politician) =

Scottish politician

Councillor Alex Kerr MSP
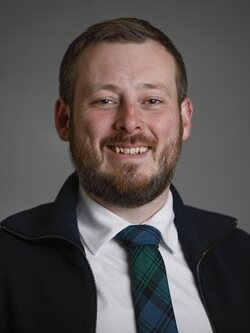
- Official Portrait 2026

National Secretary of the Scottish National Party
- Incumbent
- Assumed office 2024
- Preceded by: Lorna Finn

Member of the Scottish Parliament for Hamilton, Larkhall and Stonehouse
- Incumbent
- Assumed office 7 May 2026
- Preceded by: Davy Russell
- Majority: 2,705 (8.6%)

Personal details
- Born: Alexander John Kerr
- Party: Scottish National Party
- Education: St Aloysius' College, Glasgow
- Alma mater: University of Strathclyde

Alex Kerr is a Member of the Scottish Parliament from the Scottish National Party. He was elected at the 2026 Scottish Parliament election, succeeding Davy Russell.

== Biography ==
Kerr was a candidate for Scotland in the 2019 European Parliament election, as well as in the 2022 Glasgow City Council election for the Baillieston ward, the latter of which he was elected. He is the national secretary of the SNP.

In the 2022 Glasgow City Council election, Kerr was elected to represent Baillieston (ward) on Glasgow City Council. His term began on 5 May 2022 and is scheduled to run until 6 May 2027.

Kerr has worked for a number of Members of the Scottish Parliament including John Mason former MSP for Shettleston, as a Communications Officer for Christina McKelvie former MSP for Hamilton, Larkhall and Stonehouse, and as a Caseworker for Ivan McKee during his time as MSP for Glasgow Provan
