= Alasdair Morrison (politician) =

British politician (born 1968)

Member of the Scottish Parliament for Western Isles
- In office 6 May 1999 – 2 April 2007
- Preceded by: New Parliament
- Succeeded by: Alasdair Allan

Personal details
- Born: 18 November 1968 (age 57) Stornoway, Isle of Lewis, Scotland
- Party: Scottish Labour

Alasdair Morrison (Gaelic: Alasdair Moireasdan) (born 18 November 1968 in Stornoway) is a Scottish Labour politician. He was the Member of the Scottish Parliament (MSP) for the Western Isles constituency from 1999 to 2007.

Morrison was educated at Paible School, North Uist, and the Nicolson Institute, Isle of Lewis.

== News career ==
He worked for the BBC in Inverness, Glasgow and Stornoway. He was employed as a news reporter and contributed to television and radio news programmes in both Gaelic and English. Until 1999, he was the Editor of the Gaelic newspaper, An Gàidheal Ùr. In 2008 he was appointed as the chairman of MG Alba.

== Political career ==
At the May 1999 election to the 1st Scottish Parliament, Morrison was elected as the MSP for the Western Isles. He served as Deputy Minister for Highlands and Islands and Gaelic and as Deputy Minister for Enterprise & Lifelong Learning and Gaelic in the Scottish Executive until November 2001. He was a member of the Environment and Rural Development Committee. He was re-elected at the 2003.

He lost his seat in the 2007 election to Alasdair Allan of the Scottish National Party where he was one of only two candidates in the entire election to win over 40% of the votes cast in their constituency and not win the seat, the other being Jamie Hepburn in Cumbernauld and Kilsyth.

At the 2015 UK general election he contested the Na h-Eileanan an Iar Westminster seat, coming second behind the sitting SNP MP Angus MacNeil, with 4,560 votes (28.6%).

In May 2006, he was accused of a conflict of interest after raising questions in Holyrood to help the Scottish Golf Union, who at the time were represented by a firm run by Morrison's brother.

In May 2025, Morrison stood for selection as Labour's candidate for the Hamilton, Larkhall and Stonehouse by-election. Davy Russell was narrowly selected by just two votes ahead of Suzanne Macleod, a member of Labour's Scottish Executive Committee. The outcome was attributed to Morrison encouraging members at the final selection meeting to support Russell instead of himself.

== See also ==
- List of Scottish Governments

Scottish Parliament
| New parliament Scotland Act 1998 | Member of the Scottish Parliament for Western Isles; 1999–2007 | Succeeded by Alasdair Allan |
