= Beinn na Foghla agus Uibhist a Tuath (ward) =

Former electoral ward in the Outer Hebrides, Scotland

- Na h-Eileanan Siar
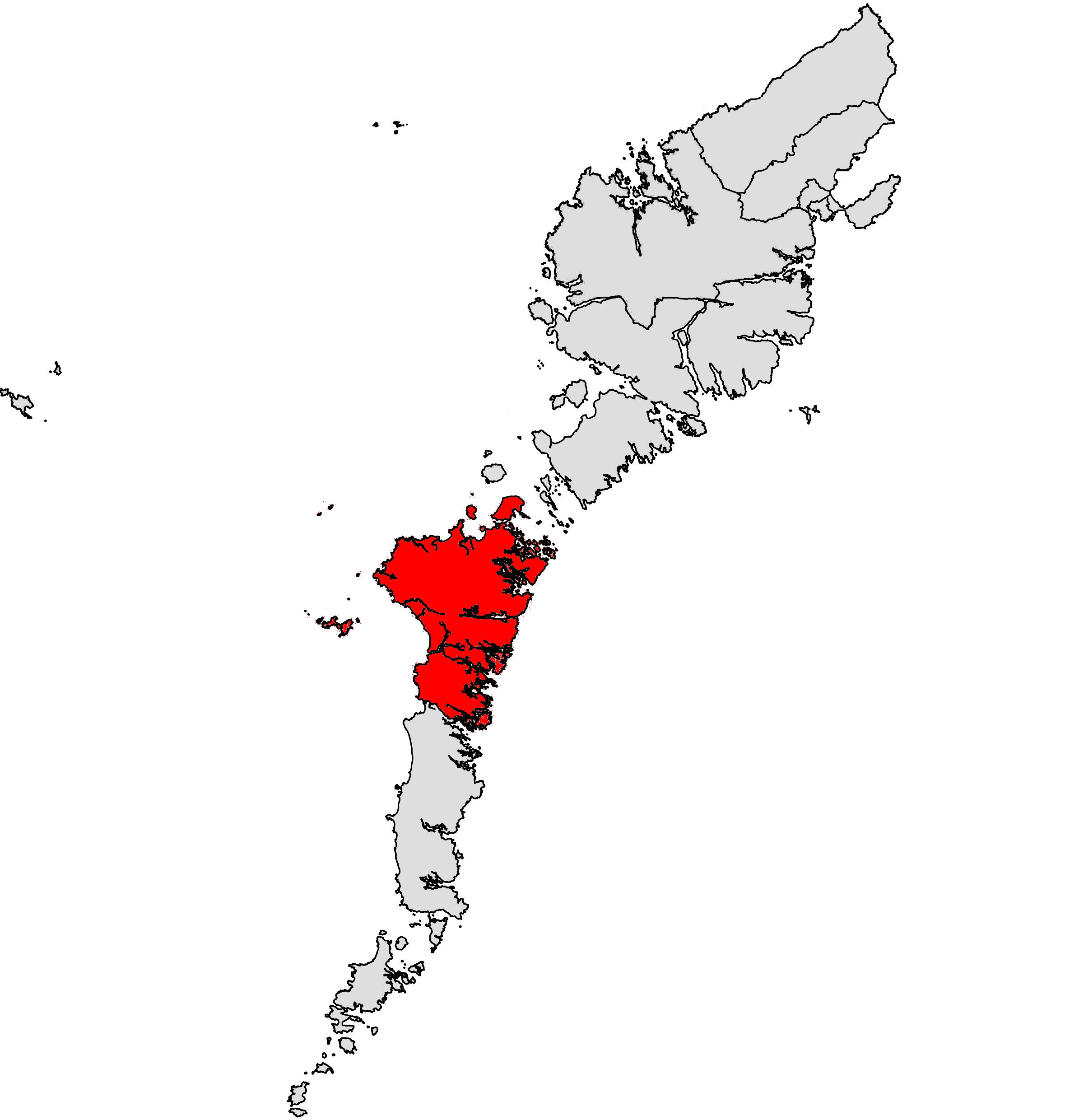
- Boundary of Beinn na Foghla agus Uibhist a Tuath in Na h-Eileanan Siar from 2007–2022.
- Electorate: 2,342 (2017)
- Major settlements: Balivanich; Lochmaddy
- Scottish Parliament constituency: Na h-Eileanan an Iar
- Scottish Parliament region: Highlands and Islands
- UK Parliament constituency: Na h-Eileanan an Iar

2007–2022
- Number of councillors: 3
- Replaced by: Uibhist a Deas, Èirisgeigh agus Beinn na Faoghla; Uibhist a Tuath
- Created from: Eochar; Harris West; Lochmaddy; North Benbecula; Paible

Beinn na Foghla agus Uibhist a Tuath (Scottish Gaelic for 'Benbecula and North Uist') was one of the nine wards of Comhairle nan Eilean Siar (Scottish Gaelic for 'Council of the Western Isles'). Created in 2007, the ward elected three councillors using the single transferable vote electoral system. As a result of the Islands (Scotland) Act 2018, the ward was abolished in 2022.

Independents have dominated elections in the Western Isles and all but one of the councillors elected in the area had no party affiliation.

== Boundaries ==
The ward was created following the Fourth Statutory Reviews of Electoral Arrangements ahead of the 2007 Scottish local elections. As a result of the Local Governance (Scotland) Act 2004, local elections in Scotland would use the single transferable vote electoral system from 2007 onwards so Beinn na Foghla agus Uibhist a Tuath was formed from an amalgamation of several previous first-past-the-post wards. It contained all of the former Lochmaddy, North Benbecula and Paible wards as well as the northern half of the former Eochar ward and a few islands in the south of the former Harris West ward. The ward centred around the islands in the middle of the Outer Hebrides island chain and included Benbecula and North Uist as well as a number of uninhabited surrounding islands and the remote, uninhabited island of St Kilda in the Atlantic Ocean. Proposals in the Fifth Statutory Reviews of Electoral Arrangements ahead of the 2017 Scottish local elections would have seen the ward's boundaries unchanged. However, these were not adopted by Scottish ministers as plans for the Islands (Scotland) Act 2018 would bring forward an interim review following the 2017 elections.

The Islands (Scotland) Act 2018 allowed for the creation of single- and dual-member wards to allow for better representation of island areas. As a result, the ward was abolished and replaced by the Uibhist a Deas, Èirisgeigh agus Beinn na Faoghla and Uibhist a Tuath wards.

== Councillors ==
Year	Councillors		
2007	Martin Taylor (Independent)	Uisdain Robertson (Independent)	Archie K. Campbell (Labour)
2012	Neil M. Beaton (Independent)	Uisdain Robertson (Independent)	Archie K. Campbell (Labour)
2015	Neil M. Beaton (Independent)	Uisdain Robertson (Independent)	Andrew Walker (Independent)
2017	Iain MacLeod (Independent)	Uisdain Robertson (Independent)	Roddy McKay (Independent)

== Election results ==
=== 2017 election ===
Beinn na Foghla agus Uibhist a Tuath – 3 seats
Party	Candidate	FPv%	Count							
Party	Candidate	FPv%	1	2	3	4	5	6	7	8
Independent	Uisdean Robertson (incumbent)	28.8	355							
Independent	Iain MacLeod	19.2	237	242	247	261	275	318		
Independent	Roddy MacKay	16.0	197	202	209	215	236	261	264	342
SNP	Roslyn MacPherson	12.6	156	159	162	170	180	201	202	
Independent	Andrew Walker (incumbent)	8.3	102	115	126	139	161			
Independent	Neil Beaton (incumbent)	5.8	71	79	89	97				
Independent	John MacLeod	5.3	65	67	74					
Conservative	Ken MacBrayne	4.1	51	51						
Electorate: 2,342 Valid: 1,234 Spoilt: 26 Quota: 309 Turnout: 53.8%

=== 2012 Election ===
2012 Comhairle nan Eilean Siar election

Beinn na Foghla agus Uibhist a Tuath - 3 seats
Party	Candidate	FPv%	Count					
Party	Candidate	FPv%	1	2	3	4	5	6
Independent	Uisdean Robertson (incumbent)	29.34%	316					
Independent	Neil MacDonald Beaton	19.67%	212	222.6	241.1	263.5	264.0	359.7
Labour	Archie K. Campbell (incumbent)†††	18.94%	204	224.4	241.5	271.5		
SNP	Andrew Walker	16.43%	177	181.2	186.5	219.7	219.9	
Independent	Martin Taylor (incumbent)	8.64%	93	97.2	111.5			
Independent	Michael MacLean	6.96%	75	76.3				
Electorate: 2,329 Valid: 1,077 Spoilt: 25 Quota: 270 Turnout: 1,102 (46.24)%

=== 2007 Election ===
2007 Comhairle nan Eilean Siar election

Comhairle nan Eilean Siar election, 2007: Beinn na Foghla Agus Uibhist A Tuath
Party	Candidate	FPv%	%	Seat	Count
Labour	Archie K Campbell	459	35.0	1	1
Independent	Uisdain Robertson	343	26.1	2	1
Independent	Martin Taylor	251	19.1	3	4
Independent	Angus MacAulay	203	15.4		
Independent	John Huson	58	4.4		
