= Na h-Eileanan an Iar (Scottish Parliament constituency) =

Scottish Parliament constituency

- County constituency for the Scottish Parliament
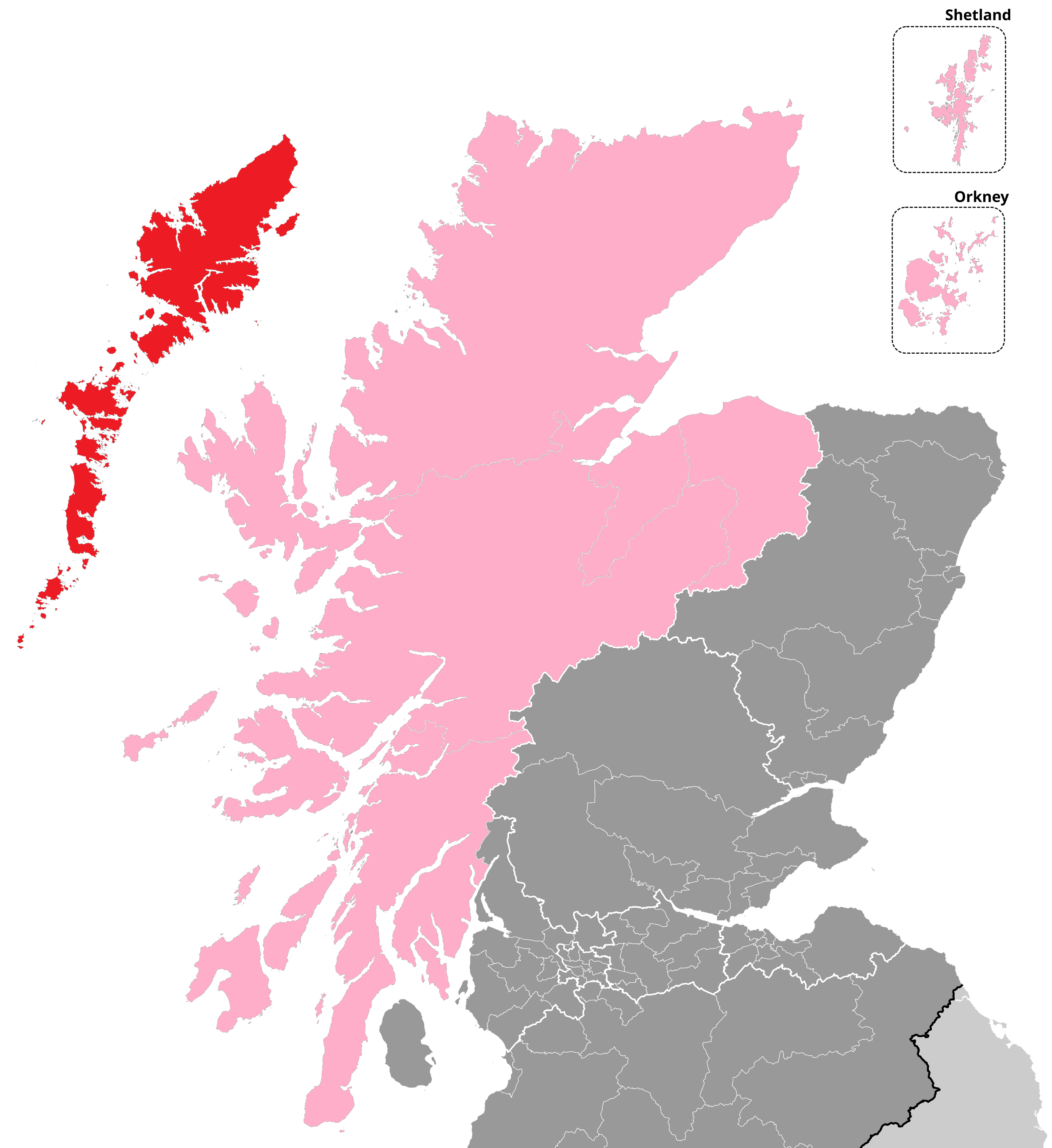

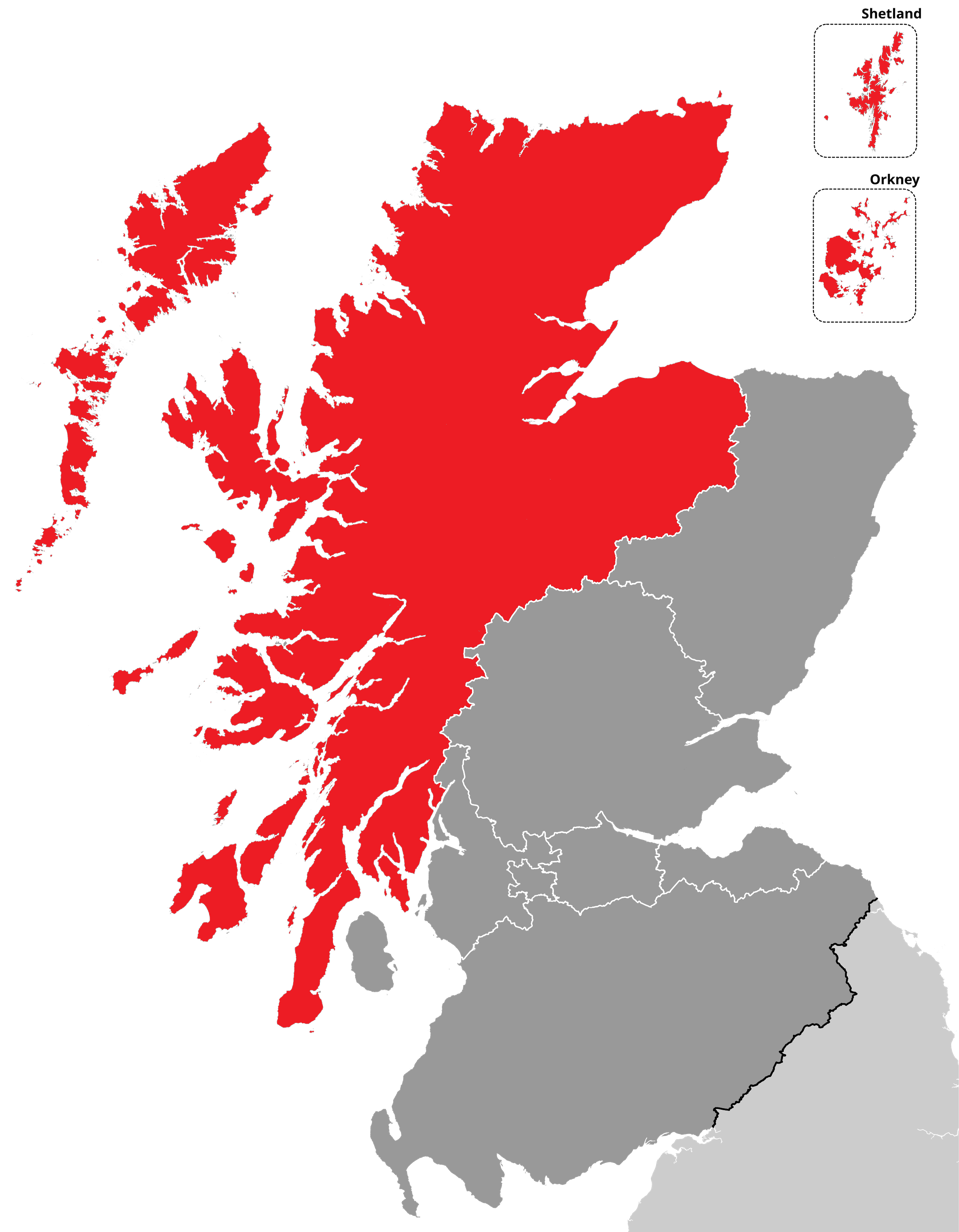
- Na h-Eileanan an Iar shown within the Highlands and Islands electoral region, and the region shown within Scotland
- Electoral region: Highlands and Islands
- Population: 26,020 (2024)
- Electorate: 21,808 (2026)

Current constituency
- Created: 1999
- Party: Scottish Labour
- MSP: Donald MacKinnon
- Council area: Na h-Eileanan Siar

Na h-Eileanan an Iar (/nə ˈhɪlənən ənˈjɪər/; Scottish Gaelic pronunciation: [nəˈhelanən əˈɲiəɾ]), formerly the Western Isles, is a county constituency of the Scottish Parliament covering the council area of Na h-Eileanan Siar. It elects one Member of the Scottish Parliament (MSP) by the first past the post method of election. Under the additional-member electoral system used for elections to the Scottish Parliament, it is also one of eight constituencies in the Highlands and Islands electoral region, which elects seven additional members, in addition to the eight constituency MSPs, to produce a form of proportional representation for the region as a whole.

The seat has been held by Donald MacKinnon of Scottish Labour since 2026.

== Electoral region ==
The Na h-Eileanan an Iar constituency is part of the Highlands and Islands electoral region; the other seven constituencies are Argyll and Bute, Caithness, Sutherland and Ross, Inverness and Nairn, Moray, Orkney Islands, Shetland Islands and Skye, Lochaber and Badenoch.

The region covers most of Argyll and Bute council area, all of the Highland council area, most of the Moray council area, all of the Orkney Islands council area, all of the Shetland Islands council area and all of Na h-Eileanan Siar.

== Constituency boundaries and council area ==
The Western Isles constituency was created at the same time as the Scottish Parliament, with the name and boundaries of the existing Western Isles constituency of the UK Parliament. It voted for the first time in the 1999 Scottish Parliament election. From the 2005 United Kingdom general election, however, the name of the Westminster (House of Commons) constituency was changed to Na h-Eileanan an Iar.

The Holyrood constituency covers Na h-Eileanan Siar (the Western Isles council area), comprising its nine wards: Barraigh, Bhatarsaigh, Eirisgeigh agus Uibhist a Deas; Beinn Na Foghla agus Uibhist a Tuath; Na Hearadh agus Ceann a Deas Nan Loch; Sgir’ Uige agus Ceann a Tuath Nan Loch; Sgire an Rubha; Steòrnabhagh a Deas; Steòrnabhagh a Tuath; Loch a Tuath; An Taobh Siar agus Nis.

Geographically, the constituency consists of the Outer Hebridean islands. The major islands are Barra, Benbecula, Lewis and Harris, North Uist and South Uist. On the grounds of the remoteness of the constituency from the rest of Scotland, and the difficulties involved in getting from island to island, there is a significantly smaller electorate than in the mainland Scottish Parliament constituencies.

== Politics ==
The seat had been a two-way marginal between the Scottish Labour and the Scottish National Party for many years. In recent years it had become increasingly safe for the Scottish National Party, but returned to Labour in the 2026 election. In the 2014 Scottish independence referendum the constituency voted against independence by a margin of 53.42% (10,544) to 46.58% (9,195) in favour on a turnout of 86.2%

== Member of the Scottish Parliament ==
Election	Member	Party
1999	Alasdair Morrison	Labour
2007	Alasdair Allan	SNP
2026	Donald MacKinnon	Labour

== Election results ==
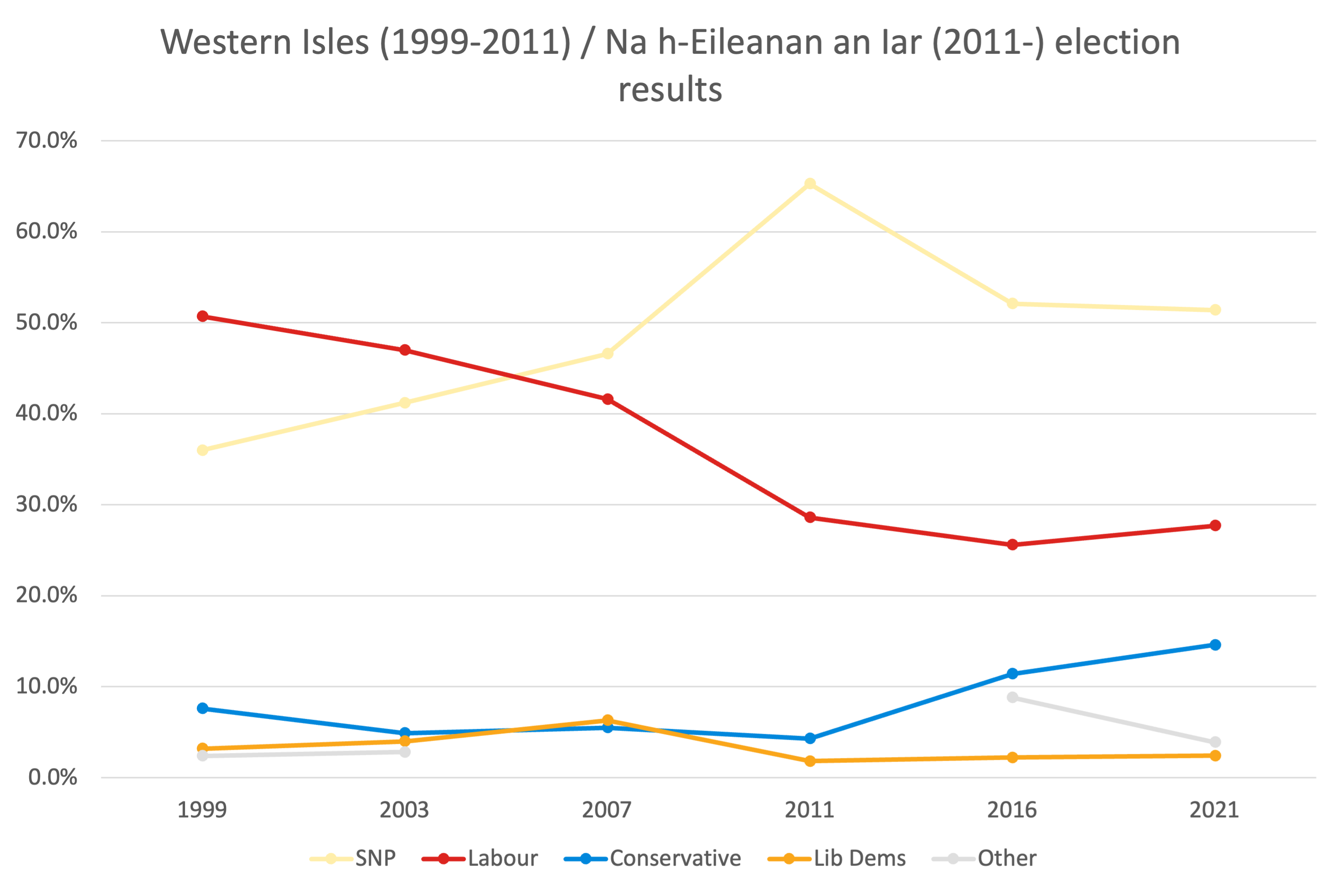
Na h-Eileanan an Iar election results 1999–2021

=== 2020s ===
2026 Scottish Parliament election: Na h-Eileanan an Iar
Party	Candidate	Constituency			Regional		
Party	Candidate	Votes	%	±%	Votes	%	±%
Labour	Donald MacKinnon	4,665	37.7	▲10.0	3,242	26.2	▲4.9
SNP	Alasdair Allan (Note: Incumbent member for this constituency)	4,511	36.5	▼14.9	3,618	29.2	▼13.9
Reform	Malcolm McTaggart	1,625	13.1	New	1,654	13.4	▲13.4
Green					929	7.5	▲1.8
Conservative	George MacPherson	594	4.8	▼9.8	909	7.3	▼10.5
Liberal Democrats	Jamie Dobson	812	6.6	▲4.2	733	5.9	▲3.7
Scottish Christian					342	2.8	▲2.8
Scottish Family					275	2.2	▼1.2
AtLS					174	1.4	▲1.4
Independent	Duncan MacPherson				139	1.1	▲1.1
ISP					113	0.9	▲0.9
Independent Green Voice					78	0.6	▲0.6
Workers Party					46	0.4	▲0.4
Scottish Socialist					43	0.3	▲0.3
Advance UK					37	0.3	▲0.3
Scottish Rural Party					20	0.2	▲0.2
Scottish Libertarian					13	0.1	▼0.1
Independent	Mick Rice				12	0.1	▲0.1
Sovereignty	Kenny MacKenzie (Note: MacKenzie is standing on a joint ticket on behalf of Sovereignty and the Alliance to Liberate Scotland.)	159	1.3	▲1.3			
Majority		154	1.2	▼22.5			
Valid votes		12,366			12,377		
Invalid votes		67			41		
Turnout		12,366	56.7	▼9.3	12,418	56.9	▼9.4
Labour gain from SNP		Swing		▲12.5			
Notes

2021 Scottish Parliament election: Na h-Eileanan an Iar
Party	Candidate	Constituency			Regional		
Party	Candidate	Votes	%	±%	Votes	%	±%
SNP	Alasdair Allan (Note: Incumbent member for this constituency)	7,454	51.4	▼0.7	6,266	43.11	▼2.4
Labour	Shaun Fraser	4,013	27.7	▲2.1	3,095	21.29	▼1.8
Conservative	Gavin Berkenheger	2,116	14.6	▲3.2	2,591	17.83	▲6.3
Green					850	5.85	▲1.1
Independent	Callum MacMillan	571	3.9	New			
Scottish Family					501	3.45	New
Liberal Democrats	Neil Mitchison	353	2.4	▲0.2	324	2.23	▲0.1
Alba					316	2.17	New
Independent	Andy Wightman (Note: Incumbent member on the list for Lothian region, having been elected as a member of the Scottish Greens in 2016)				262	1.80	New
All for Unity					102	0.70	New
Abolish the Scottish Parliament					39	0.27	New
Reform					32	0.22	New
Freedom Alliance (UK)					31	0.21	New
Scottish Libertarian					27	0.19	New
Independent	Hazel Mansfield				27	0.19	New
TUSC					24	0.17	New
UKIP					24	0.17	▼1.8
Restore Scotland					23	0.16	New
Majority		3,441	23.7	▼2.8			
Valid votes		14,507			14,534		
Invalid votes		86			55		
Turnout		14,593	66.4	▲5.3	14,589	66.3	▲5.1
SNP hold		Swing		▼1.5			

=== 2010s ===
2016 Scottish Parliament election: Na h-Eileanan an Iar
Party	Candidate	Constituency			Regional		
Party	Candidate	Votes	%	±%	Votes	%	±%
SNP	Alasdair Allan (Note: Incumbent member for this constituency)	6,874	52.1	▼13.2	6,024	45.5	▼11.0
Labour	Rhoda Grant (Note: Incumbent member on the party list, or for another constituency)	3,378	25.6	▼3.0	3,061	23.1	▼0.3
Conservative	Ranald Fraser	1,499	11.4	▲7.1	1,522	11.5	▲6.8
Scottish Christian	John Cormack	1,162	8.8	New	1,238	9.4	▲2.9
Green					624	4.7	▲2.0
Liberal Democrats	Ken MacLeod	293	2.2	▲0.4	280	2.1	▲0.5
UKIP					260	2.0	▲1.2
Independent	James Stockan				113	0.9	New
Solidarity					57	0.4	▲0.3
RISE					54	0.4	New
Majority		3,496	26.5	▼10.2			
Valid votes		13,206			13,233		
Invalid votes		59			39		
Turnout		13,265	61.1	▲1.2	13,272	61.2	▲1.2
SNP hold		Swing		▼8.1			
Notes

2011 Scottish Parliament election: Na h-Eileanan an Iar
Party	Candidate	Constituency			Regional		
Party	Candidate	Votes	%	±%	Votes	%	±%
SNP	Alasdair Allan (Note: Incumbent member for this constituency)	8,496	65.3	▲18.7	7,366	56.5	
Labour	Donald Crichton	3,724	28.6	▼13.0	3,049	23.4	
Scottish Christian					842	6.5	
Conservative	Charlie McGrigor	563	4.3	▼1.2	616	4.7	
Green					349	2.7	
Liberal Democrats	Peter Morrison	228	1.8	▼4.5	214	1.6	
All-Scotland Pensioners Party					158	1.2	
Socialist Labour					120	0.9	
UKIP					98	0.8	
BNP					77	0.6	
Scottish Socialist					37	0.3	
Solidarity					16	0.1	
Others					92	0.7	
Majority		4,772	36.7	▲31.7			
Valid votes		13,011			13,034		
Invalid votes		68			59		
Turnout		13,079	59.9	▼1.9	13,093	60.0	
SNP hold		Swing		▲15.9			

=== 2000s ===
2007 Scottish Parliament election: Western Isles
Party	Candidate	Votes	%	±%
SNP	Alasdair Allan	6,354	46.6	+5.4
Labour	Alasdair Morrison	5,667	41.6	−5.4
Liberal Democrats	Ruaraidh Ferguson	852	6.3	+2.3
Conservative	Dave Petrie	752	5.5	+0.6
Majority		687	5.0	N/A
Turnout		13,625	61.8	+3.4
SNP gain from Labour		Swing	+5.4	

Scottish Parliament Election 2003: Western Isles
Party	Candidate	Votes	%	±%
Labour	Alasdair Morrison	5,825	47.0	−3.7
SNP	Alasdair Nicholson	5,105	41.2	+5.2
Conservative	Frank Warren	612	4.9	−2.7
Liberal Democrats	Conor Snowden	498	4.0	+0.8
Scottish Socialist	Joanne Telfer	347	2.8	+0.4
Majority		720	5.8	−8.9
Turnout		12,387	58.4	−3.3
Labour hold		Swing		

=== 1990s ===
Scottish Parliament Election 1999: Western Isles
Party	Candidate	Votes	%
Labour	Alasdair Morrison	7,248	50.7
SNP	Alasdair Nicholson	5,155	36.0
Conservative	Jamie McGrigor	1,095	7.6
Liberal Democrats	John Horne	456	3.2
Scottish Socialist	Joanne Telfer	347	2.4
Majority		2,093	14.7
Turnout		14,301	61.7
Labour win (new seat)			

== See also ==
- Na h-Eileanan an Iar (UK Parliament constituency)
