= Marion Fellows =

Scottish National Party politician

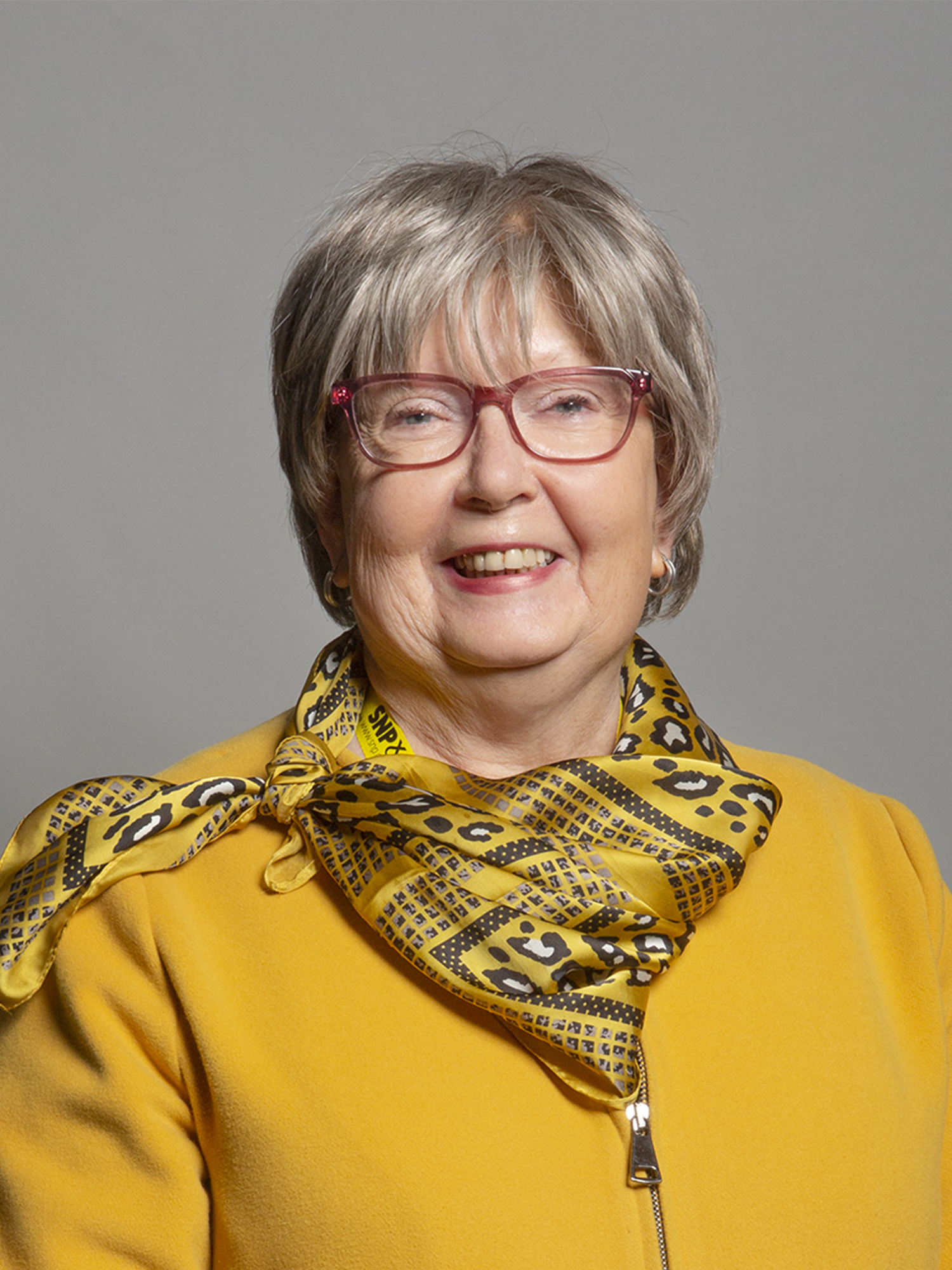
- Official portrait, 2019

SNP Spokesperson for Disabilities
- In office 7 January 2020 – 10 December 2022
- Leader: Ian Blackford
- Preceded by: Natalie McGarry
- Succeeded by: Office abolished

SNP Spokesperson for Small Business, Enterprise and Innovation
- In office 20 June 2017 – 7 January 2020
- Leader: Ian Blackford
- Preceded by: Office established
- Succeeded by: Douglas Chapman

SNP Whip
- In office 20 May 2015 – 30 May 2024
- Leader: Angus Robertson; Ian Blackford; Stephen Flynn

Member of Parliament for Motherwell and Wishaw
- In office 7 May 2015 – 30 May 2024
- Preceded by: Frank Roy
- Succeeded by: Pamela Nash (Motherwell, Wishaw and Carluke

Personal details
- Born: Marion Fullarton; 5 May 1949 (age 77) Irvine, Scotland
- Party: Scottish National Party
- Education: Heriot-Watt University

Marion Fellows (née Fullarton, born 5 May 1949) is a Scottish National Party (SNP) politician. From 2015 until 2024, she was the Member of Parliament for Motherwell and Wishaw. Between June 2017 and January 2020 she was the SNP spokesperson for Small Business, Enterprise and Innovations.

== Early life and career ==
Fellows studied Accountancy and Finance at Heriot Watt University. For nineteen years, she taught business studies at West Lothian College, where she was an active member of the Educational Institute of Scotland (EIS) trade union.

== Political career ==
Fellows was elected in 2012 as a North Lanarkshire Councillor for Wishaw, and was active in the "Yes Motherwell and Wishaw" campaign during the 2014 Scottish independence referendum, which managed to achieve a majority in North Lanarkshire for leaving the United Kingdom, which made North Lanarkshire one of only 4 (out of 32) Scottish council districts to vote for independence, despite a national majority voting to stay in the UK.

In 2007, Fellows unsuccessfully contested the Motherwell and Wishaw Scottish Parliament constituency against the incumbent, then-First Minister of Scotland Jack McConnell, and then in 2010 unsuccessfully contested the Motherwell and Wishaw United Kingdom Parliament constituency, losing to the incumbent Frank Roy.

At the 2015 UK general election, Fellows was elected as the MP for Motherwell and Wishaw, with a majority of 11,898 votes. After being elected, she was appointed as an SNP whip in May 2015 and was a member of the Education Committee between July 2015 and May 2017 and then again between September 2017 and November 2019. She was also a member of the Education, Skills and the Economy Sub-Committee between October 2016 and May 2017.

Fellows was re-elected as MP for the seat at the 2017 UK General Election, with a significantly decreased majority of 318 votes. Between October 2018 and November 2019 she was a member of the Administration Committee. In June 2017, she was appointed the SNP spokesperson for Small Business, Enterprise and Innovation, a post she held until January 2020.

Fellows was again re-elected at the 2019 UK general election as the MP for Motherwell and Wishaw, with an increased majority of 6,268 votes. In January 2020, she was appointed the SNP spokesperson for disabilities.

In January 2020, Fellows became a member of the Speaker's Committee for the Independent Parliamentary Standards Authority, and in March 2020 she became a member of the Administration Committee.

In the 2024 UK general election, she contested the new seat of Motherwell, Wishaw and Carluke but was unseated by Pamela Nash.

== Personal life ==
Marion has lived with her family in Wishaw and Bellshill since the 1970s. Marion was married to her husband George, until his death in 2018 from Sarcoma.

She was a supporter of the launch of Scottish Postmasters for Justice and Redress (SPJR) campaign.

Parliament of the United Kingdom
Preceded by Frank Roy	Member of Parliament for Motherwell and Wishaw; 2015–2024	Constituency abolished
