= Karen Fishwick =

Scottish actor and musician (born 1990)

- Born: 12 May 1990 (age 36); Clarkston, Scotland
- Occupation: Actor
- Years active: 2013 - present
- Known for: Badults

Karen Fishwick (born 12 May 1990) is a Scottish actor and musician.

Fishwick was born in Clarkston, East Renfrewshire. She trained at Motherwell College.

She has appeared in a number of productions in Glasgow at the Citizens Theatre and other venues, starring in productions of Our Lady of Perpetual Succour and Hansel and Gretel.

She has a husband and a daughter.

== Theatre ==
Year	Title	Role	Company	Director |	Notes
2015	The Caucasian Chalk Circle	Young Woman, Lawyer	Lyceum Theatre, Edinburgh	Mark Thomson	adaptation by Alistair Beaton
2018	Romeo and Juliet	Juliet	Royal Shakespeare Company	William Shakespeare	directed by Erica Whyman

== Filmography ==
Year	Title	Role	Notes
2013	Badults	Helen	"Food"
2015	The Hum	Ellie	Short Film
2016	Scot Squad	Caroline Reid	

== Stage productions ==
- Present Laughter (2013, as Daphne)
- Lady Windermere's Fan (2013, as Lady Agatha)
- Mr Bolfry (2014, as Jean)
- The Yellow on the Broom (2014, as Bessie)
- Beauty and the Beast (2014 - 2015, as Bonnie)
- The Caucasian Chalk Circle (2015, as Young Woman/Lawyer and others)
- Mother Goose (2015 - 2016, as Ginny Goose)
- Our Ladies of Perpetual Succour (2015 - 2016, as Kay)
- Hansel and Gretel (2016, as Gretel)
- Romeo and Juliet (2018 - 2019, as Juliet)
- KELI (2025, as Jayne/ Lady Snaresbrook/ Musician)
