= Na Hearadh agus Ceann a Deas nan Loch (ward) =

Electoral ward in Outer Hebrides, Scotland

- Na h-Eileanan Siar
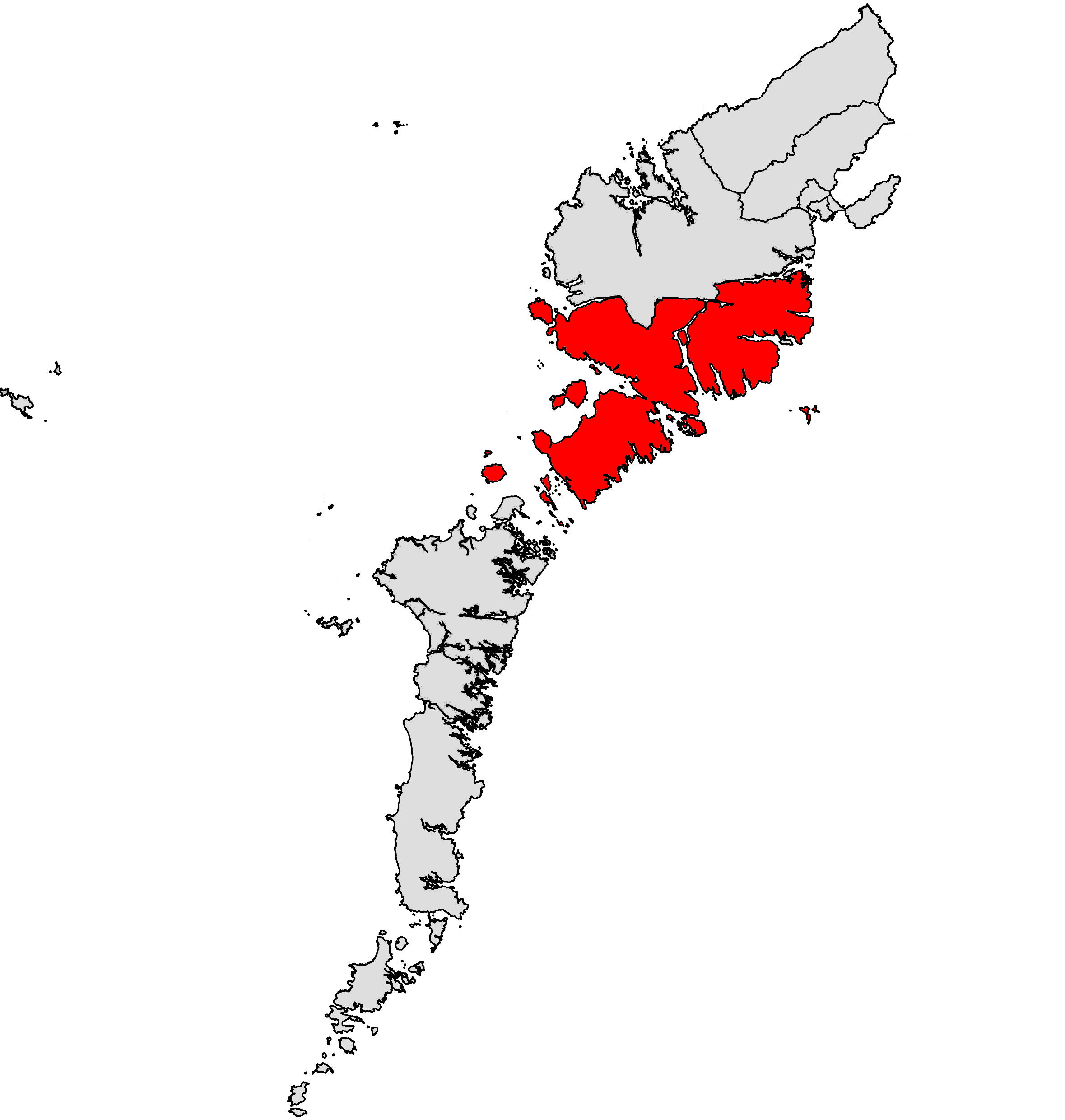
- Boundary of Na Hearadh agus Ceann a Deas nan Loch in Na h-Eileanan Siar from 2007–2022.
- Electorate: 2,342 (2017)
- Major settlements: Crossbost; Tarbert
- Scottish Parliament constituency: Na h-Eileanan an Iar
- Scottish Parliament region: Highlands and Islands
- UK Parliament constituency: Na h-Eileanan an Iar

2007–2022
- Number of councillors: 3
- Replaced by: Na Hearadh; Sgìre nan Loch

Na Hearadh agus Ceann a Deas nan Loch (Scottish Gaelic for 'Harris and South of The Lochs') was one of the nine wards of Comhairle nan Eilean Siar (Scottish Gaelic for 'Council of the Western Isles'). Created in 2007, the ward elected three councillors using the single transferable vote electoral system. As a result of the Islands (Scotland) Act 2018, the ward was abolished in 2022.

Independents have dominated elections in the Western Isles and the majority of the councillors elected in the area had no party affiliation. However, the Scottish National Party (SNP) also held one seat at each election.

== Councillors ==
Election	Councillors		
2007	Philip Robert MacLean (SNP)	Morag Munro (Independent)	Catherine MacDonald (Independent)
2012	Philip Robert MacLean (SNP)	D.J. McKay (Labour)	Catherine MacDonald (Independent)
2017	John Mitchell (SNP)	Finlay Cunningham (Independent)	Paul Finnegan (Independent)

== Election results ==
=== 2017 election ===
Na Hearadh agus Ceann a Deas nan Loch – 3 seats
Party	Candidate	FPv%	Count							
Party	Candidate	FPv%	1	2	3	4	5	6	7	8
Independent	Finlay Cunningham	33.2	381							
Independent	Paul Finnegan	16.5	189	214	215	219	224	239	261	359
SNP	John Mitchell	15.0	172	179	179	181	220	228	236	278
Independent	Catherine McDonald (incumbent)	14.5	166	187	187	191	195	199	218	
Independent	Sheena MacLeod	7.0	80	91	91	95	98	126		
Independent	Denise Wilson	5.6	64	66	70	72	73			
SNP	Fiona MacLeod	4.1	47	50	51	55				
Independent	D. J. MacRae (incumbent)	3.7	42	43	45					
Independent	Alex Smith	0.6	7	7						
Electorate: 1,860 Valid: 1,148 Spoilt: 28 Quota: 288 Turnout: 63.2%

=== 2012 Election ===
2012 Comhairle nan Eilean Siar election

Na Hearadh agus Ceann a Deas Nan Loch - 3 seats
Party	Candidate	FPv%	Count			
Party	Candidate	FPv%	1	2	3	4
Independent	Catherine MacDonald (incumbent)	62.09%	498			
SNP	Philip Robert MacLean (incumbent)	25.19%	202			
Labour	D.J. MacRae	8.6%	69	163.8	163.9	193.5
SNP	David Cameron Wilson	4.11%	33	105.2	105.8	
Electorate: 1,922 Valid: 802 Spoilt: 18 Quota: 201 Turnout: 830 (41.73)%

=== 2007 Election ===
2007 Comhairle nan Eilean Siar election

Comhairle nan Eilean Siar election, 2007: Na Hearadh Agus Ceann A Deas Nan Loch
Party	Candidate	FPv%	%	Seat	Count
Independent	Morag Munro	583	49.0	1	1
Independent	Catherine MacDonald	239	20.1	2	2
SNP	Philip Robert MacLean	136	11.4	3	6
Independent	Donald MacLeod	84	7.1		
Independent	Morris Black	76	6.4		
Liberal Democrats	Paul Blake	71	6.0		
