= Hamilton Grammar School =

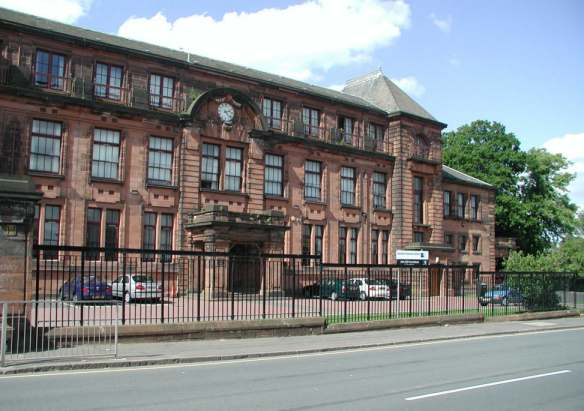
- Front of the school

Location
- Auchincampbell Road; Hamilton, South Lanarkshire, ML3 6PS; Scotland; 55.77408°N 4.04625°W

Information
- Type: Secondary School
- Motto: Sola Nobilitat Virtus (Latin: 'Virtue Alone Ennobles')
- Established: 1972
- Local authority: South Lanarkshire Council
- Head teacher: Graeme Sives
- Staff: 103.8 (on an FTE basis)
- Years: S1-S6
- Gender: Co-educational
- Age: 11 to 18
- Enrolment: 1248
- Houses: Avon, Brandon, Cadzow, Douglas, Forsyth, Wilson
- Colours: Green, Blue
- Accreditation: Scottish Qualifications Authority
- Website: www.hamilton.s-lanark.sch.uk

Hamilton Grammar School is a secondary school serving Hamilton, South Lanarkshire, Scotland.

Its predecessors can trace their history back to 1452. With the introduction of comprehensive schools and the abolition of selective schools such as Hamilton Academy in the early-1970s, Hamilton Grammar School was formed as a new school, using the buildings of the former Hamilton Academy and the nearby St. John's Grammar School.

The current Hamilton Grammar building was built in 1913 as the Hamilton Academy building. The building underwent an £8,000,000 improvement in 1995, when the original building was retained and fully renovated, with an additional building extension attached to the rear. The new building contains science and technical facilities, In 2004, a communication development unit was added to the school.

A new Physical Education centre was built at the rear of the school. Building work started in June 2008 and was completed for August 2009. This replaced the old Physical Education department which was at the back of St John's Primary School.

The current head teacher is Graeme Sives who joined the school on 3 May 2016, replacing the retired Head Teacher, Colin Stewart.

== Notable alumni ==
Notable former pupils include The Reverend Scott J Brown, formerly Chaplain of the Fleet, Royal Navy who was a pupil from 1980 to 1985 and is currently the National Chaplain of the Royal British Legion, and Scottish international footballer Davie Cooper.

- Davy Russell, politician
