= Hamilton, Larkhall and Stonehouse =

Region or constituency of the Scottish Parliament

- Burgh constituency for the Scottish Parliament
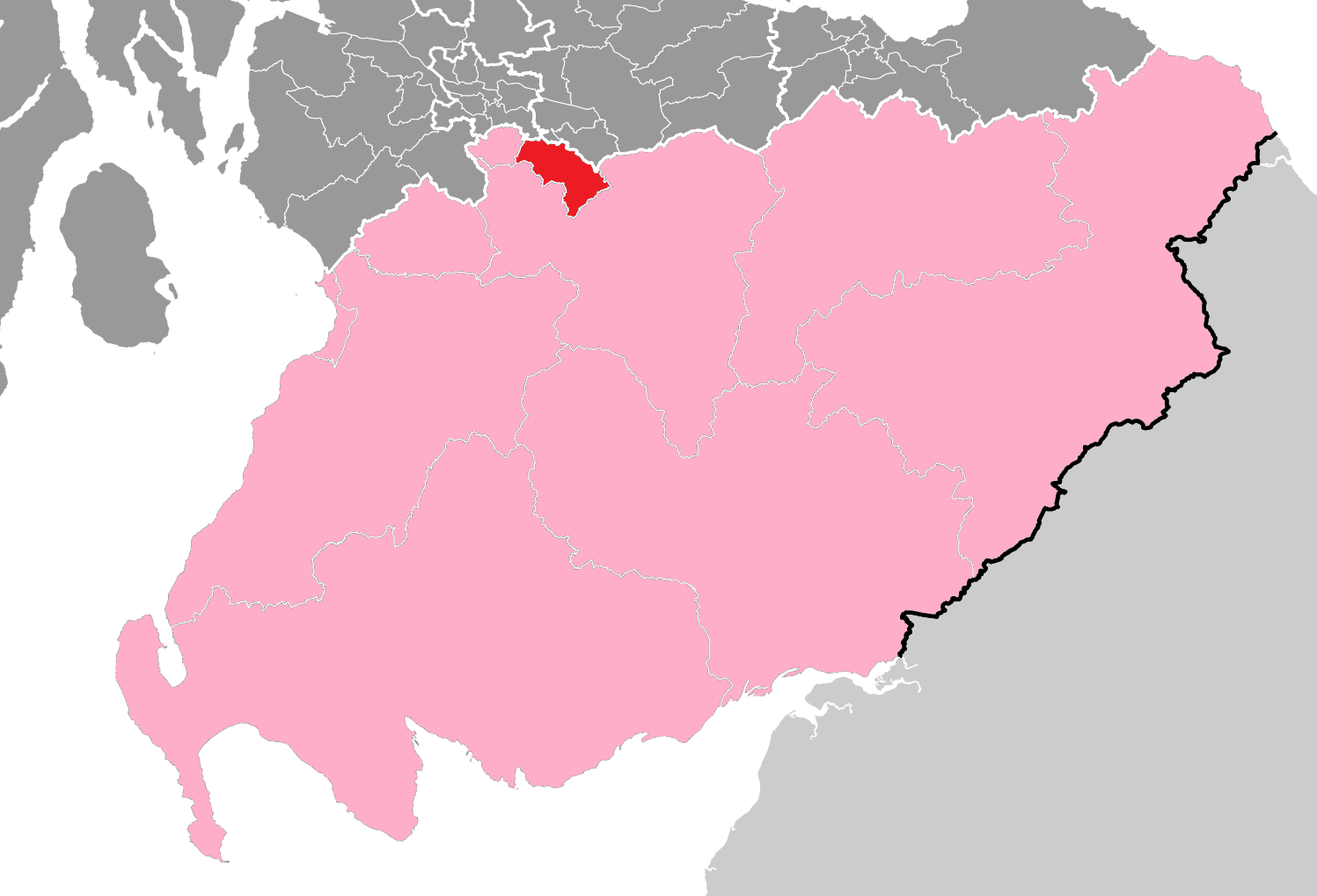

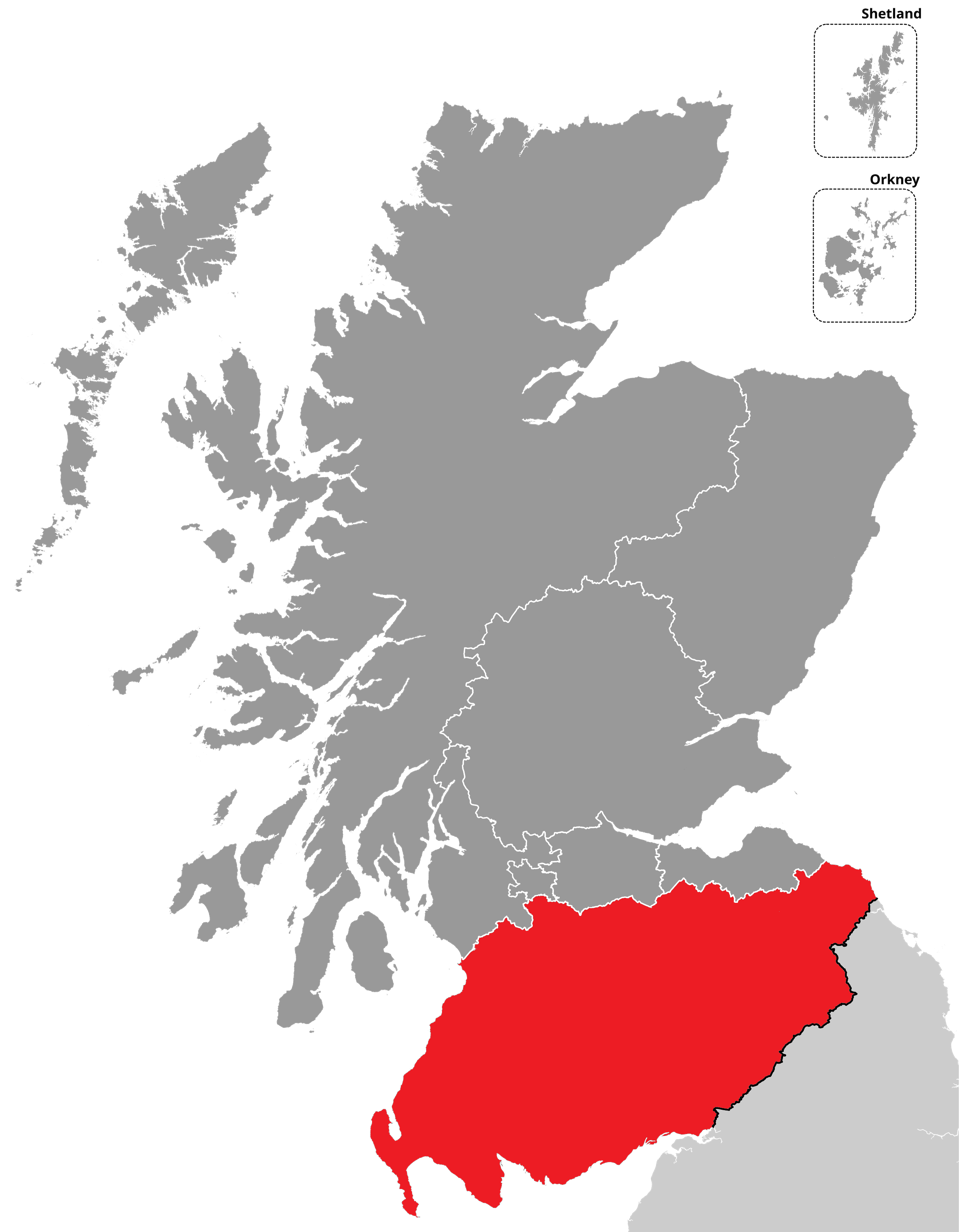
- Hamilton, Larkhall and Stonehouse shown within the South Scotland electoral region, and the region shown within Scotland
- Electoral region: South Scotland
- Electorate: 62,297 (2026)

Current constituency
- Created: 2011
- Party: SNP
- MSP: Alex Kerr
- Council area: South Lanarkshire

Hamilton, Larkhall and Stonehouse is a burgh constituency of the Scottish Parliament covering part of the council area of South Lanarkshire. Under the additional-member electoral system used for elections to the Scottish Parliament, it elects one Member of the Scottish Parliament (MSP) by the first past the post method of election. It is also one of ten constituencies in the South Scotland electoral region, which elects seven additional members, in addition to the ten constituency MSPs, to produce a form of proportional representation for the region as a whole. The seat was first formed ahead of the 2011 Scottish Parliament election.

The seat is held by Alex Kerr of the Scottish National Party, who regained the constituency at the 2026 Scottish Parliament election after Scottish Labour had won it in the 2025 Hamilton, Larkhall and Stonehouse by-election. The seat was previously held by Christina McKelvie of the Scottish National Party from its creation in 2011 until her death in March 2025.

== Electoral region ==
Following the second periodic review of Scottish Parliament boundaries in 2025, Hamilton, Larkhall and Stonehouse was moved from the Central Scotland electoral region into the South Scotland Region. The other nine constituencies of this region are: Ayr; Carrick, Cumnock and Doon Valley; Clydesdale; Dumfriesshire; Ettrick, Roxburgh and Berwickshire; Galloway and West Dumfries; East Kilbride; Kilmarnock and Irvine Valley; and Midlothian South, Tweeddale and Lauderdale. The region covers the whole of the council areas of Dumfries and Galloway, Scottish Borders, and South Ayrshire; and parts of the council areas of East Ayrshire, Midlothian, and South Lanarkshire. By population it is now the largest of Scotland's eight electoral regions.

Prior to the 2025 review, Hamilton, Larkhall and Stonehouse formed part of the Central Scotland region; the review saw this replaced by a region entitled Central Scotland and Lothians West. The other eight constituencies of the Central Scotland region were: Airdrie and Shotts, Coatbridge and Chryston, Cumbernauld and Kilsyth, Falkirk East, Falkirk West, East Kilbride, Motherwell and Wishaw and Uddingston and Bellshill. The region covered all of the Falkirk council area, all of the North Lanarkshire council area and part of the South Lanarkshire council area.

== Constituency boundaries and council areas ==
Map of boundaries from 2005

Hamilton, Larkhall and Stonehouse is one of five covering the South Lanarkshire council area. Of the five, Clydesdale, and East Kilbride are also now within the South Scotland region; Rutherglen is within the Glasgow region; Uddingston and Bellshill is part of the Central Scotland and Lothians West region.

The constituency was created for the 2011 Scottish Parliament election from parts of the former constituencies of Hamilton South and Hamilton North and Bellshill, along with some areas that were formerly in the Clydesdale constituency. Its boundaries remained unchanged following the Second Periodic Review of Scottish Parliament Boundaries undertaken by Boundaries Scotland ahead of the 2026 Scottish Parliament election.

The Hamilton, Larkhall and Stonehouse constituency consists of the following electoral wards of South Lanarkshire Council:

- Hamilton West and Earnock (entire ward)
- Hamilton South (entire ward)
- Larkhall (entire ward)
- Avondale and Stonehouse (shared with Clydesdale)
- Hamilton North and East (shared with Uddingston and Bellshill)

== Member of the Scottish Parliament ==
Election	Member	Party
2011	Christina McKelvie	SNP
2025 by-election	Davy Russell	Labour
2026	Alex Kerr	SNP

== Election results ==
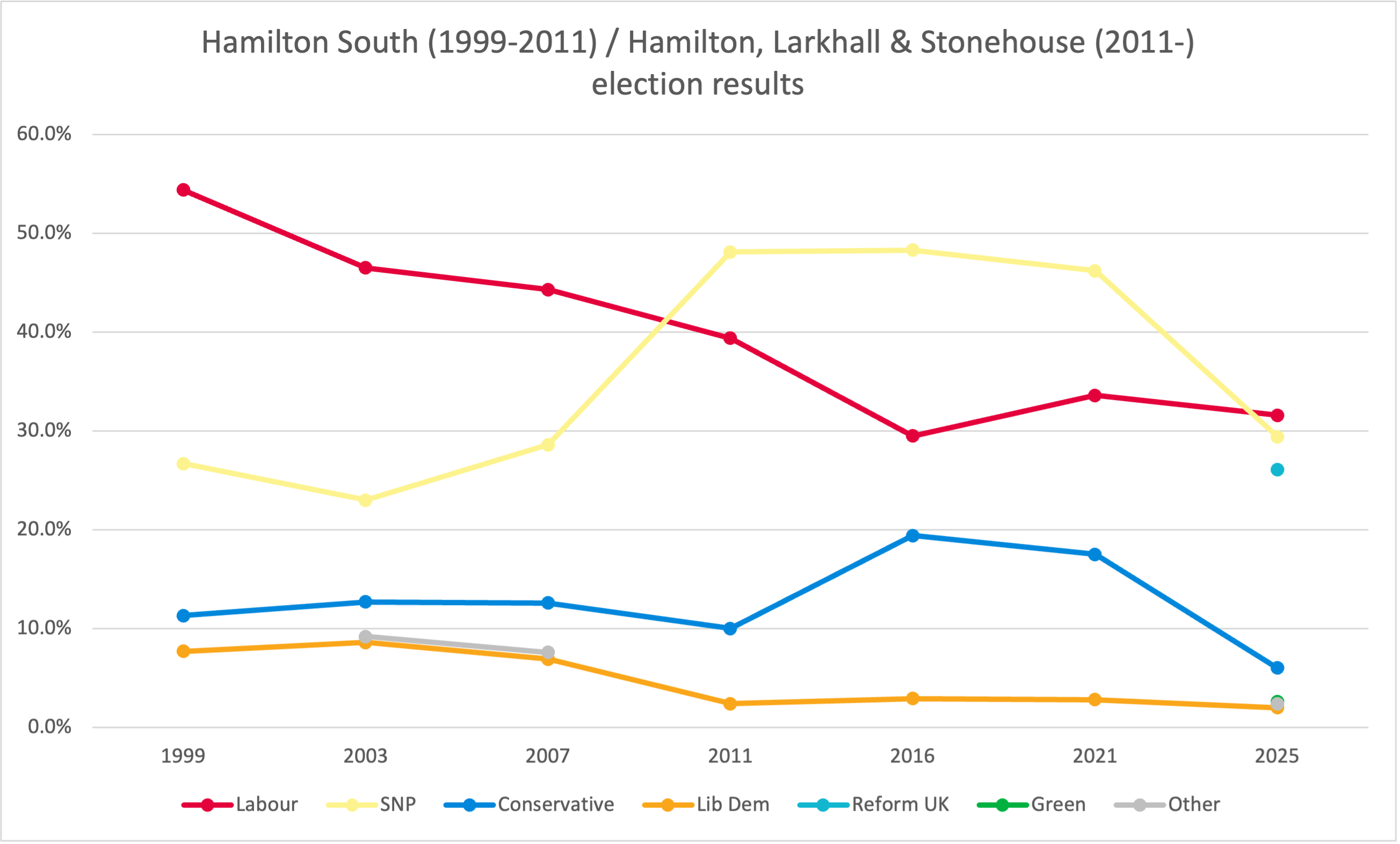
Hamilton, Larkhall & Stonehouse election results 1999-2025

=== 2020s ===
2026 Scottish Parliament election: Hamilton, Larkhall and Stonehouse
Party	Candidate	Constituency			Regional		
Party	Candidate	Votes	%	±%	Votes	%	±%
SNP	Alex Kerr	11,825	37.8	▼8.4	8,921	28.5	▼12.5
Labour	Davy Russell (Note: Incumbent member for this constituency)	9,120	29.2	▼4.4	7,326	23.4	▼1.8
Reform	John McNamee	7,193	23.0	New	7,532	24.0	▲23.8
Green					3,143	10.0	▲4.8
Conservative	Alexandra Herdman	1,617	5.2	▼12.3	2,070	6.6	▼15.2
Liberal Democrats	Michael Weatherhead	1,156	3.7	▲0.9	1,123	3.6	▲1.4
Independent Green Voice					293	0.9	▲0.4
AtLS					281	0.9	New
Scottish Family					261	0.8	▲0.2
Scottish Socialist					131	0.4	New
ADF	David Ballantine	348	1.1	New	99	0.3	New
Heritage					39	0.1	New
Independent	Denise Sommerville				38	0.1	New
Independent	Sean Davies				34	0.1	New
UKIP					27	0.1	0.0
Scottish Libertarian					24	0.1	▼0.1
Scottish Common Party					9	0.0	New
Majority		2,705	8.6	▼12.6			
Valid votes		31,259			31,351		
Invalid votes		132			88		
Turnout		31,391	50.4	▼10.5	31,439	50.5	▼10.5
SNP gain from Labour		Swing					
Notes

2025 Hamilton, Larkhall and Stonehouse by-election
Party	Candidate	Votes	%	±%
Labour	Davy Russell	8,559	31.6	▼2.0
SNP	Katy Loudon	7,957	29.4	▼16.8
Reform	Ross Alexander Lambie	7,088	26.1	New
Conservative	Richard Nelson	1,621	6.0	▼11.5
Green	Ann McGuinness	695	2.6	New
Liberal Democrats	Aisha Jawaid Mir	533	2.0	▼0.8
Scottish Socialist	Collette Bradley	278	1.0	New
Scottish Family	Andy Brady	219	0.8	New
Independent	Marc Wilkinson	109	0.4	New
UKIP	Janice Elizabeth Mackay	50	0.2	New
Majority		602	2.2	N/A
Turnout		27,155	44.2	▼16.7
Labour gain from SNP		Swing	▲7.4	

2021 Scottish Parliament election: Hamilton, Larkhall and Stonehouse
Party	Candidate	Constituency			Regional		
Party	Candidate	Votes	%	±%	Votes	%	±%
SNP	Christina McKelvie (Note: Incumbent member for this constituency)	16,761	46.2	▼2.1	14,924	41.0	▼2.0
Labour	Monica Lennon (Note: Incumbent member on the party list, or for another constituency)	12,179	33.6	▲4.1	9,187	25.2	▼1.4
Conservative	Meghan Gallacher	6,332	17.5	▼1.9	7,925	21.8	▲2.7
Green					1,897	5.2	▲0.6
Liberal Democrats	Mark McGeever	1,012	2.8	▼0.1	809	2.2	▲0.2
Alba					489	1.3	New
All for Unity					345	0.9	New
Scottish Family					215	0.6	New
Independent Green Voice					186	0.5	New
Abolish the Scottish Parliament					117	0.3	New
Scottish Libertarian					78	0.2	New
Freedom Alliance (UK)					60	0.2	New
Reform					58	0.2	New
UKIP					53	0.1	▼2.2
Independent	Paddy Hogg				51	0.1	New
Majority		4,582	12.6	▼6.2			
Valid votes		36,284			36,394		
Invalid votes		136			62		
Turnout		36,420	60.9	▲10.6	36,456	61.0	▲10.7
SNP hold		Swing		▼3.1			

=== 2010s ===
2016 Scottish Parliament election: Hamilton, Larkhall and Stonehouse
Party	Candidate	Constituency			Regional		
Party	Candidate	Votes	%	±%	Votes	%	±%
SNP	Christina McKelvie (Note: Incumbent member for this constituency)	13,945	48.3	▲0.2	12,468	43.0	▼2.8
Labour	Margaret McCulloch (Note: Incumbent member on the party list, or for another constituency)	8,508	29.5	▼9.9	7,707	26.6	▼7.0
Conservative	Margaret Mitchell	5,596	19.4	▲9.4	5,519	19.1	▲11.3
Green					1,322	4.6	▲1.8
UKIP					673	2.3	▲1.6
Liberal Democrats	Eileen Baxendale	836	2.9	▲0.5	575	2.0	▲0.4
Scottish Christian					270	0.9	▼0.4
Solidarity					256	0.9	▲0.7
RISE					133	0.5	New
Independent	Deryck Beaumont				42	0.1	New
Majority		5,437	18.8	▲10.1			
Valid votes		28,885			28,965		
Invalid votes		110			58		
Turnout		28,995	50.3	▲5.0	29,023	50.3	▲4.9
SNP hold		Swing		▲5.1			
Notes

2011 Scottish Parliament election: Hamilton, Larkhall and Stonehouse
Party	Candidate	Constituency			Regional		
Party	Candidate	Votes	%	±%	Votes	%	±%
SNP	Christina McKelvie (Note: Incumbent member on the party list, or for another constituency)	12,202	48.1	N/A	11,666	45.8	N/A
Labour	Tom McCabe	9,989	39.4	N/A	8,571	33.6	N/A
Conservative	Margaret Mitchell	2,547	10.0	N/A	1,984	7.8	N/A
Green					720	2.8	N/A
All-Scotland Pensioners Party					657	2.6	N/A
Liberal Democrats	Ewan Hoyle	616	2.4	N/A	419	1.6	N/A
Scottish Christian					332	1.3	N/A
BNP					228	0.9	N/A
Socialist Labour					220	0.9	N/A
Scottish Unionist					206	0.8	N/A
UKIP					170	0.7	N/A
Independent	Hugh O'Donnell				88	0.4	N/A
Scottish Socialist					65	0.3	N/A
Solidarity					50	0.2	N/A
Scottish Homeland Party					31	0.1	N/A
Majority		2,113	8.7	N/A			
Valid votes		25,354			25,407		
Invalid votes		92			84		
Turnout		25,446	45.3	N/A	25,491	45.4	N/A
SNP win (new seat)							

=== Bibliography ===
- "Second Review of Scottish Parliament Boundaries: Report to Scottish Ministers" (PDF). Boundaries Scotland. April 2025.
