= Our Lady's High School, Motherwell =

Coordinates: 55.776777°N 3.976109°W

Our Lady's High School
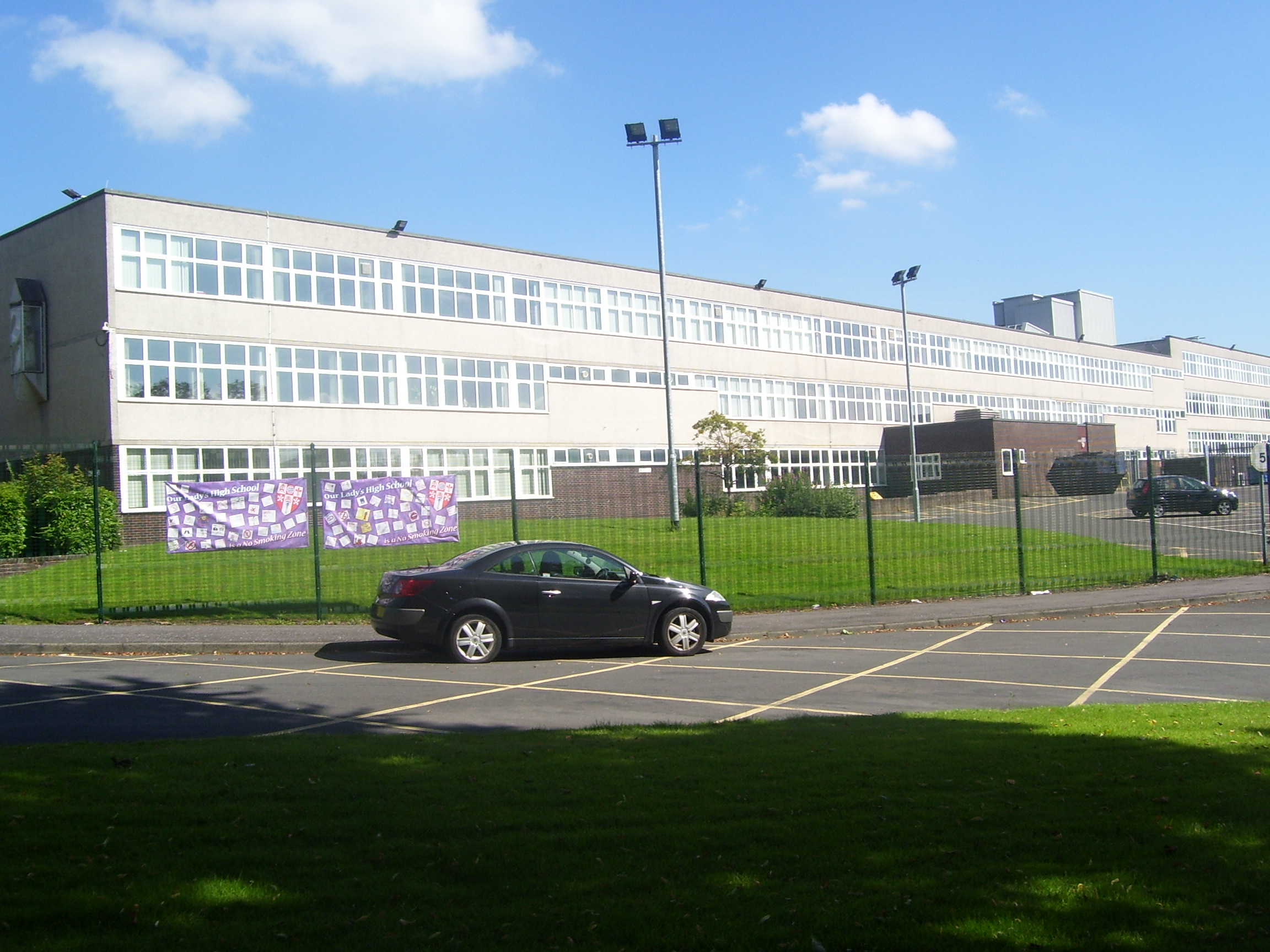

Location
- Dalzell Drive; Motherwell, North Lanarkshire, ML1 2DG; Scotland

Information
- Type: Roman Catholic high school
- Motto: Mary seat of wisdom pray for us
- Local authority: North Lanarkshire Council
- Head teacher: Louisa McGraw
- Gender: Catholic Comprehensive
- Age: 11 to 18
- Website: https://blogs.glowscotland.org.uk/nl/olhsmotherwell/

Our Lady's High School is a Roman Catholic secondary school for 11- to 18-year-olds in Motherwell, North Lanarkshire, that is close to Fir Park stadium. Our Lady’s High School educates around 850 pupils with the headteacher being Louisa McGraw.

== History ==
The school was established in 1888, making it one of the oldest Roman Catholic secondary schools in Scotland. It was originally an all-boys school and the first class of girls was not enrolled until 1945. In the same year, the school's War Memorial Chapel, built with funds raised by the school community, was opened. The current building on Dalzell Drive was built in 1974.

== Performing arts and physical education ==
Performing Arts is strong in the school with both Music and Drama (Drama being set up in 2005 to successful acclaim). The school wind band achieved a gold at the National Concert Band Festival in 2005-06. On 30 March 2007 the band attained a gold award at the Festival and then won the Lanarkshire Youth Musical Award for 2007.

Their senior football team achieved national success in 2000 when they won the Under-18 Scottish Schools Football Shield. This was the eighth time the school has won this trophy.

== Notable former pupils ==
- Sir Matt Busby (1909-1994) - former manager of Manchester United
- Thomas Winning (1925-2001) - Archbishop of Glasgow
- Billy McNeill (1940-2019) - footballer, Celtic and Scotland national football team
- Bobby Murdoch (1944-2001) - footballer for Celtic and Scotland
- Sir Tom Devine (b. 1945) - historian
- Patrick Doyle (b. 1953) - composer
- Chic McSherry (b. 1958) - businessman, writer and musician
- Colin Fox (b. 1959) - former MSP
- Martin Ledwith, actor
- Brian McCardie (b. 1965) - actor
- Stephen Pearson (b. 1982) - footballer, Motherwell and Celtic
- Frank Roy (b. 1958) - former MP (1997-2015)
- Kieran Tierney (b. 1997) - footballer Celtic and Scotland national football team
