= The Ferret (website) =

Media cooperative in Scotland

The Ferret is an independent non-profit media cooperative in Scotland set up to investigate stories in the public interest which launched in May 2015.

== History ==
The Ferret was launched in May 2015. With the support of members, it aims to produce independent investigations that can be sold to outlets in the mainstream media. The cooperative structure was chosen to allow readers to be more than passive recipients of their stories.

The Ferret was the first publication in Scotland to join press regulator Impress, and adopt an editorial policy compliant with the recommendations of the Leveson Inquiry.

A crowdfunding appeal was chosen to launch their first investigation into aspects of the fracking industry and unconventional gas. They hit their target within a week. By the close of the appeal, they had raised more than double their target and so they decided to look at the treatment of asylum seekers too.

They organised a conference with Strathclyde University held in April 2016.

In November 2016 The Ferret was shortlisted in the "Digital Innovation" category of the 2016 British Journalism Awards.

In April 2017, the co-operative launched a fact checking service. It remains the only fact checking project in Scotland to be independently assessed as meeting the International Fact Checking Network Code of Principles.

In 2018, Ferret co-founding director Billy Briggs and photographer Angela Catlin were awarded Outstanding Digital Journalist of the Year at the Scottish Press Awards. The award recognised Briggs and Catlin's reporting from Iraq the previous year, which was published by The Ferret.

The organisation also won the Online/Digital Award at the 2018 Scottish Refugee Media Awards for a story by Ferret director Karin Goodwin and Angela Catlin highlighting the increasing numbers of children being made destitute in Scotland.
