= Christina McKelvie =

Scottish politician (1968–2025)

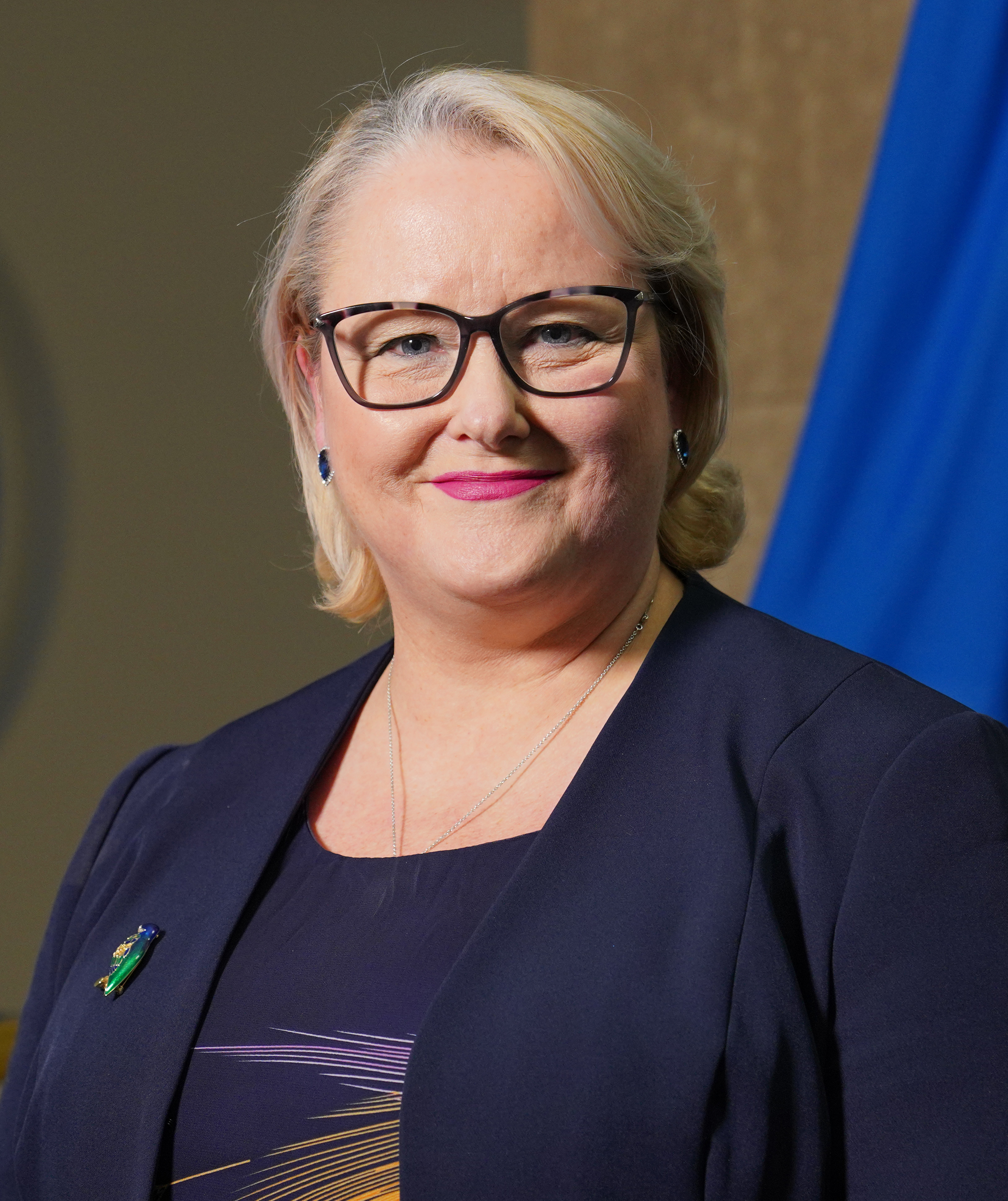
- Official portrait, 2023

Minister for Drugs and Alcohol Policy
- In office 8 February 2024 – 27 March 2025
- First Minister: Humza Yousaf; John Swinney
- Preceded by: Elena Whitham
- Succeeded by: Maree Todd

Minister for Culture, Europe and International Development
- In office 29 March 2023 – 8 February 2024
- First Minister: Humza Yousaf
- Preceded by: Neil Gray
- Succeeded by: Kaukab Stewart

Minister for Equalities and Older People
- In office 28 June 2018 – 29 March 2023
- First Minister: Nicola Sturgeon
- Preceded by: Jeane Freeman
- Succeeded by: Emma Roddick

Convener of the Equalities & Human Rights Committee
- In office 29 September 2016 – 28 June 2018
- Preceded by: Margaret McCulloch
- Succeeded by: Ruth Maguire

Member of the Scottish Parliament for Hamilton, Larkhall and Stonehouse
- In office 5 May 2011 – 27 March 2025
- Preceded by: Constituency established
- Succeeded by: Davy Russell

Member of the Scottish Parliament for Central Scotland
- In office 3 May 2007 – 22 March 2011

Personal details
- Born: 4 March 1968 Glasgow, Scotland
- Died: 27 March 2025 (aged 57) Glasgow, Scotland
- Party: Scottish National Party
- Children: 2
- Education: University of St Andrews
- Occupation: Politician
- Profession: Politician, social worker

Christina McKelvie (4 March 1968 – 27 March 2025) was a Scottish politician and social worker who served as the Member of the Scottish Parliament (MSP) for Hamilton, Larkhall and Stonehouse from 2011 until her death in 2025. A member of the Scottish National Party, she previously represented the Central Scotland region from 2007 to 2011.

McKelvie served as Minister for Equalities and Older People from 2018 to 2023, before being promoted to Minister for Culture, Europe and International Development by Humza Yousaf. In February 2024, she was appointed Minister for Drugs and Alcohol Policy, serving in this position until her death.

== Early life ==
McKelvie was born in Glasgow on 4 March 1968. She grew up in Easterhouse, in the East End of the city, and was educated at St Leonard's Secondary School. McKelvie then went on to gain qualifications from Anniesland College, Cardonald College, and the University of St Andrews. She worked in the social work services department of Glasgow City Council as a learning and development officer. She was an active trade unionist with Unison.

== Political career ==
In 2007, McKelvie was selected as the SNP candidate for the Hamilton South constituency where she was unsuccessful, however she was elected through the regional list to represent the Central Scotland region. At the 2011 Scottish Parliament election, McKelvie contested the Hamilton, Larkhall and Stonehouse seat and was elected. She served as convener of the European and External Relations Committee from 14 June 2011 until 23 March 2016.

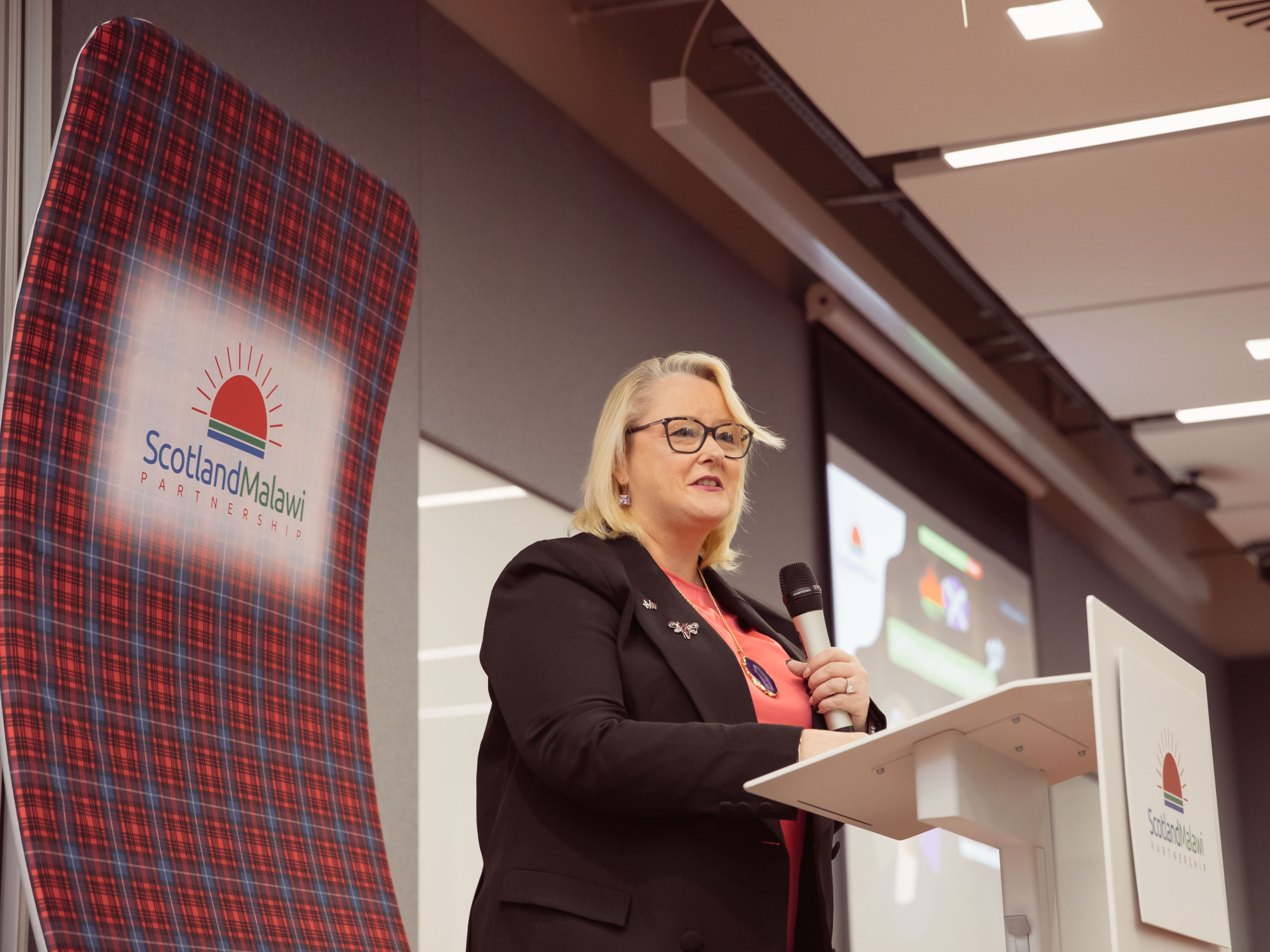
Christina McKelvie MSP addressing the Scotland Malawi Partnership in September 2023

In 2016, she was re-elected to the Hamilton, Larkhall and Stonehouse constituency. Within Parliament she became the Convener of the Equal Opportunities Committee from 16 June 2016 until 29 September 2016, then Convener of the Equalities and Human Rights Committee from 29 September 2016 until 28 June 2018.

On 28 June 2018, she became Minister for Older People and Equalities. In February 2021, she announced a short medical leave. Her ministerial role was covered by Shirley-Anne Somerville who would fill in as minister for equalities and older people. Following the Cabinet reshuffle in May 2021, she remained in that junior ministerial role, with the title changed to Minister for Equalities and Older People. A further short period of leave followed in September, after which she gave details that she had completed treatment for breast cancer. When the breast cancer charity MoonWalk event was held in Edinburgh in June 2022 for the first time in three years, she participated as part of a cross-party team of women.

In 2023, she was appointed to the Yousaf government as Minister for Culture, Europe and International Development. She visited Malawi and supported the Scotland Malawi Partnership taking SDG 5: Gender Equality as a priority.

On 8 February 2024, as part of a wider cabinet reshuffle triggered by the resignation of Michael Matheson as Health Secretary, she was appointed Minister for Drugs and Alcohol Policy.

== Illness and death ==
McKelvie attended a screening mammogram in December 2020 and was diagnosed with breast cancer on 3 February 2021, although did not make details of her illness public until after she was re-elected as an MSP in May 2021. She completed her course of treatment in 2021 and was deemed to be in remission.

In June 2024, McKelvie was diagnosed with metastatic breast cancer. She went on leave from her post as Minister for Drugs and Alcohol Policy in August 2024 to focus on her treatment.

On 12 March 2025, she announced she would stand down at the next Scottish Parliament election. Her intention was to continue with her treatment.

McKelvie died from her illness at the Glasgow Royal Infirmary, on 27 March 2025, at the age of 57. Her funeral was held on 11 April 2025 at Daldowie Crematorium near Uddingston.

== Honours ==
In February 2026, the Christina McKelvie Equality in Action Award was established by the Christina McKelvie Celebration Committee to commemorate her life and values.
