= Portvoller =

Coordinates: 58.251°N 6.157°W

Portvoller: Scottish Gaelic: Port Mholair
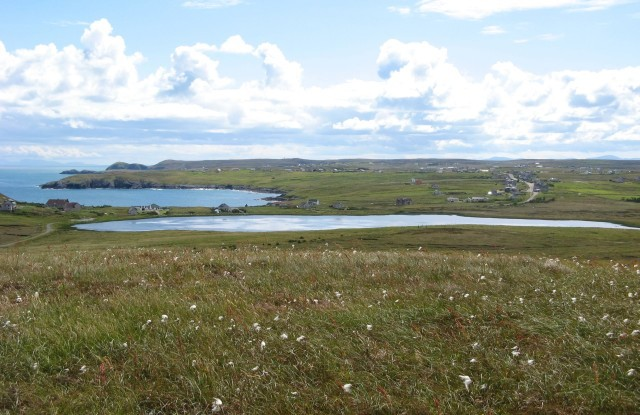
- Loch an t-Siumpain is in the centre of the picture, with the houses of Portvoller beyond

- Location within the Outer Hebrides
- Language: Scottish Gaelic; English
- OS grid reference: NB561366
- Civil parish: Stornoway
- Council area: Na h-Eileanan Siar
- Lieutenancy area: Western Isles
- Country: Scotland
- Sovereign state: United Kingdom
- Post town: ISLE OF LEWIS
- Postcode district: HS2
- Dialling code: 01851
- Police: Scotland
- Fire: Scottish
- Ambulance: Scottish
- UK Parliament: Na h-Eileanan an Iar
- Scottish Parliament: Na h-Eileanan an Iar

Portvoller (Scottish Gaelic: Port Mholair) is a small village on the north tip of the Eye Peninsula (which along with Melbost and Parkend makes up Point), on the Isle of Lewis in northwestern Scotland. It is 9 miles (14 kilometres) on the A866 from the Outer Hebrides' only town, Stornoway. Portvoller is within the parish of Stornoway.

== About the village ==
Portvoller's most prominent feature is the Tiumpan Head Lighthouse, which is located at the northernmost tip of the village.

Portvoller is also near some of the Western Isles' best fishing waters, especially rock fishing or beach casting. The headlands that are most popular for these pursuits are known locally as Billy Mor (Bilidh Mhor) and Foitelair (Foitealar). These two fishing hotspots are found about five minutes' walk from the ruined Portvoller slipway—a walk that can be a treacherous clamber after a squall or downpour. The Portvoller slipway is also near to small and secluded Shinega (Sinigeadh) beach.

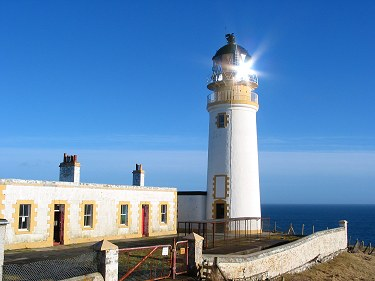
Tiumpan Head lighthouse

== Etymology ==
The village name probably originates from the Old Norse word voller (the plural of vollen, still used in some dialects of Norwegian, which denotes a hill that slants upwards gradually). Indeed, this is a quite appropriate description of the village of Portvoller.

In the period from the ninth to the twelfth century, Viking raids on the island would have been commonplace. When Norway occupied Lewis before the Treaty of Perth and the Battle of Largs, Portvoller would have been a principal landing place for arrivals from Norway.

== Surrounding villages ==
The village has several others surrounding it, including Portnaguran, Aird, Broker and Flesherin, all of which are served by the one post office, off-licence and shop. All the aforenamed villages are served by the Western Isles Council in terms of public transport and other services.
