= Aird, Lewis =

Coordinates: 58.243°N 6.159°W

Aird: Scottish Gaelic: Àird an Rubha
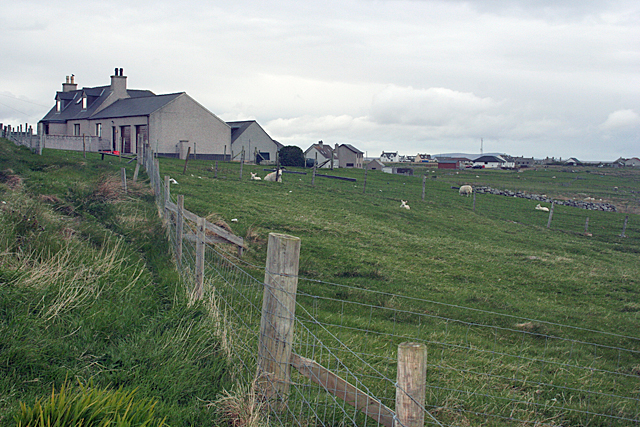
- Houses and farmland at Aird

- Location within the Outer Hebrides
- Language: Scottish Gaelic; English
- OS grid reference: NB559357
- Civil parish: Stornoway
- Council area: Na h-Eileanan Siar
- Lieutenancy area: Western Isles
- Country: Scotland
- Sovereign state: United Kingdom
- Post town: ISLE OF LEWIS
- Postcode district: HS2
- Dialling code: 01851
- Police: Scotland
- Fire: Scottish
- Ambulance: Scottish
- UK Parliament: Na h-Eileanan an Iar
- Scottish Parliament: Na h-Eileanan an Iar

Aird (Scottish Gaelic: Àird an Rubha) is a village in the Scottish council area of Eileanan Siar (Western Isles). It is located on the Eye Peninsula on the east coast of the Isle of Lewis. Aird is within the parish of Stornoway, and is situated on the A866 near the northern end of the road.

There is a shop/post office. Aird Primary School served the local area including the villages of Portvoller, Portnaguran, Broker and Flesherin. It closed in 2011 and was superseded by Point primary school,

Aird is the location of the annual Point Show, held in July each year.
