= Shulishader =

Coordinates: 58.236°N 6.199°W

Shulishader: Scottish Gaelic: Siadar an Rubha
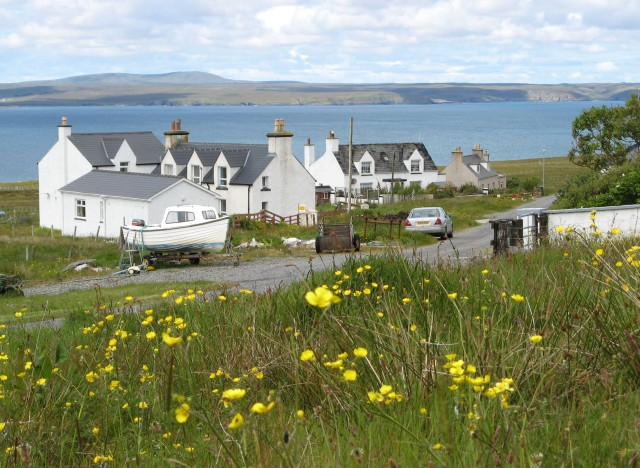
- A view of Shulishader, looking north-west over Broad Bay towards another part of Lewis

- Location within the Outer Hebrides
- Language: Scottish Gaelic; English
- OS grid reference: NB535351
- Civil parish: Stornoway
- Council area: Na h-Eileanan Siar
- Lieutenancy area: Western Isles
- Country: Scotland
- Sovereign state: United Kingdom
- Post town: ISLE OF LEWIS
- Postcode district: HS2
- Dialling code: 01851
- Police: Scotland
- Fire: Scottish
- Ambulance: Scottish
- UK Parliament: Na h-Eileanan an Iar
- Scottish Parliament: Na h-Eileanan an Iar

Shulishader (Scottish Gaelic: Siadar an Rubha) is a small village with a population of around 120 people in Point, Outer Hebrides on the Isle of Lewis, Scotland. Located on the north-western side of the Eye Peninsula, it overlooks Broad Bay. Most of the village is over 60m above sea level, affording excellent views across the bay and northern Lewis, though the land falls gently towards the sea before ending in small cliffs. There are several small, difficult to access, sandy beaches, and a small cove on the coastline. The cove is accessible via 88 dilapidated steps, and contains a pebble peach, some natural caves and a concrete structure once used for boat moorings above the high tide line.

The village is essentially a dormitory village, and there are no amenities within the village, not even a church, which is unusual for a Lewis village. An hourly bus service passes through from Portnaguran to Stornoway and in the opposite direction, though services are less frequent in the evening.

The village is surrounded by common grazing land and moorland which is worked to provide peat as fuel, but this is a declining activity. Vodafone erected a mobile phone mast on the moor, a short distance east of the centre of the village.

A Stone Age axe was discovered in Shulishader in 1982, which was radiocarbon dated to 3495–2910BC and is virtually complete with the axehead and original wooden haft.
