= Tiumpan Head Lighthouse =

Tiumpan Head Lighthouse Rubha Tiompan
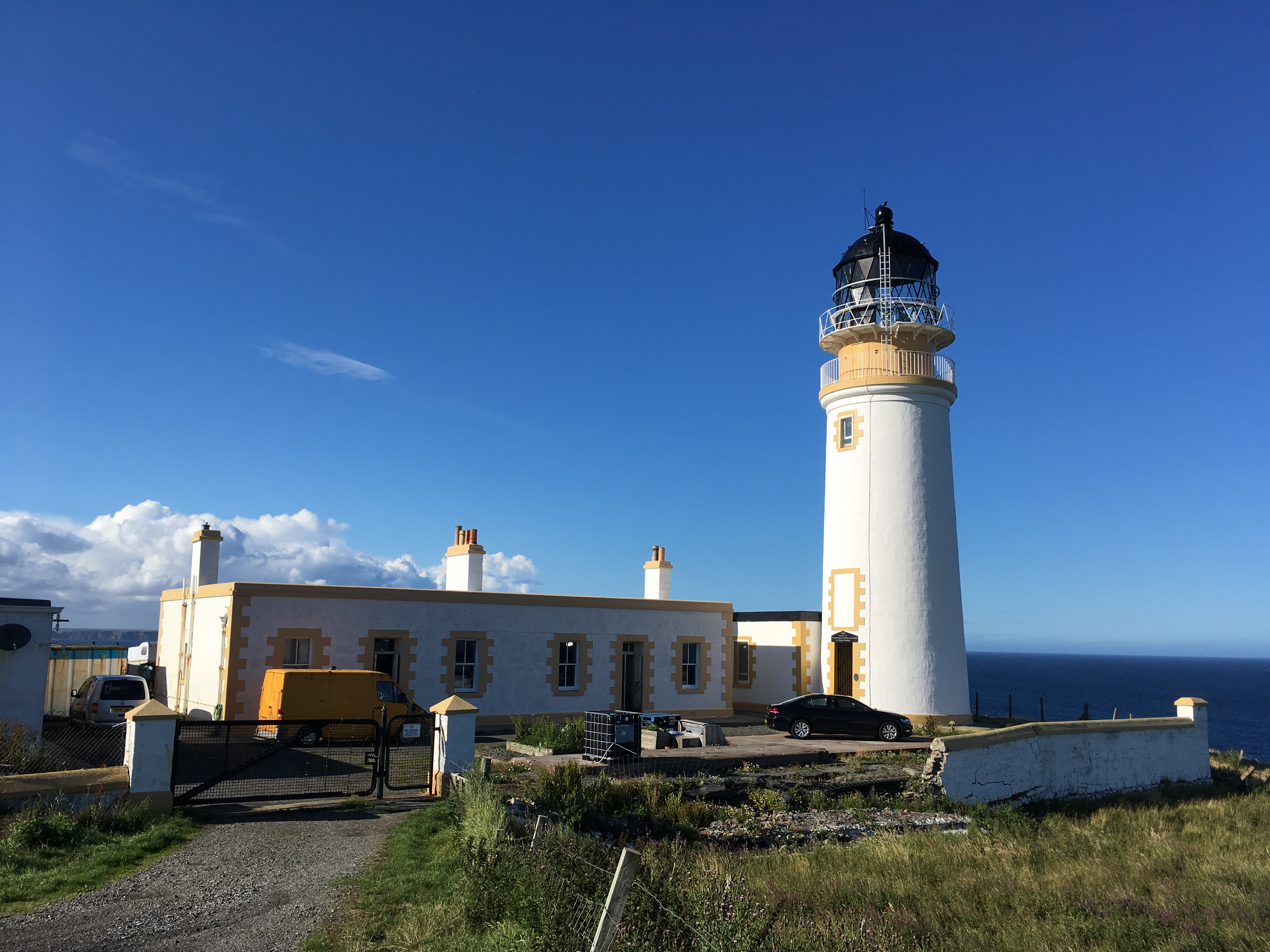
- Tiumpan Head Lighthouse
- Location: Tiumpan Head; Isle of Lewis; Outer Hebrides; Scotland
- OS grid: NB5732637719
- Coordinates: 58°15′39.33″N 6°8′20.09″W

Tower
- Constructed: 1900
- Built by: David Alan Stevenson, Charles Alexander Stevenson
- Construction: masonry tower
- Automated: 1985
- Height: 21 metres (69 ft)
- Shape: cylindrical tower with balcony and lantern
- Markings: white tower, black lantern, ochre trim
- Power source: mains electricity
- Operator: Tiumpan Head Kennels & Cattery
- Heritage: category C listed building
- Fog signal: discontinued

Light
- First lit: 1 December 1900
- Focal height: 55 metres (180 ft)
- Range: 25 nautical miles (46 km; 29 mi)
- Characteristic: Fl (2) W 15s.

The Tiumpan Head Lighthouse is an active lighthouse located in Tiumpan Head, Isle of Lewis, Outer Hebrides, Scotland.

== History ==
The idea for the Tiumpan Head Lighthouse in the village of Portvoller in Point, Isle of Lewis was long promoted, but refused for many years by the Board of Trade. After a recommendation by the Western Highlands and Islands Commission to additionally keep a watch on illegal trawlers, it was approved in May 1879.

The lighthouse and building were designed by David and Charles Stevenson and built by John Aitken, at an estimated cost of £9000. William Frew was appointed as inspector of works. Chance Brothers made the optics and Dove and Co. the revolving machine. The light was first exhibited on 1 December 1900.

Six lightkeepers were attached to the station, three lightkeepers and their families at the station, with a local assistant and two occasional lightkeepers coming in from Portnaguran village nearby.

Elizabeth II visited the lighthouse in 1956, with the young Duke of Cornwall and the Princess Anne. The seven-year-old heir to the throne sounded the first blast on a new fog siren. The fog signal was operated by compressed air supplied from a compressor, driven by a Kelvin Diesel engine. There were three Kelvin engines and compressors, and when the fog signal was in operation, two of them were in service to maintain the required air pressure with one standby, in rotation. In 1984, the fog signal was discontinued and the fog horn building was demolished.

The lighthouse was automated in 1985 and is monitored from Edinburgh. The former keepers' accommodation is no longer needed and is now home to kennels and a cattery.

== See also ==
- List of lighthouses in Scotland
- List of Northern Lighthouse Board lighthouses
