= Aignish =

Coordinates: 58.209°N 6.279°W

Aignish: Scottish Gaelic: Aiginis
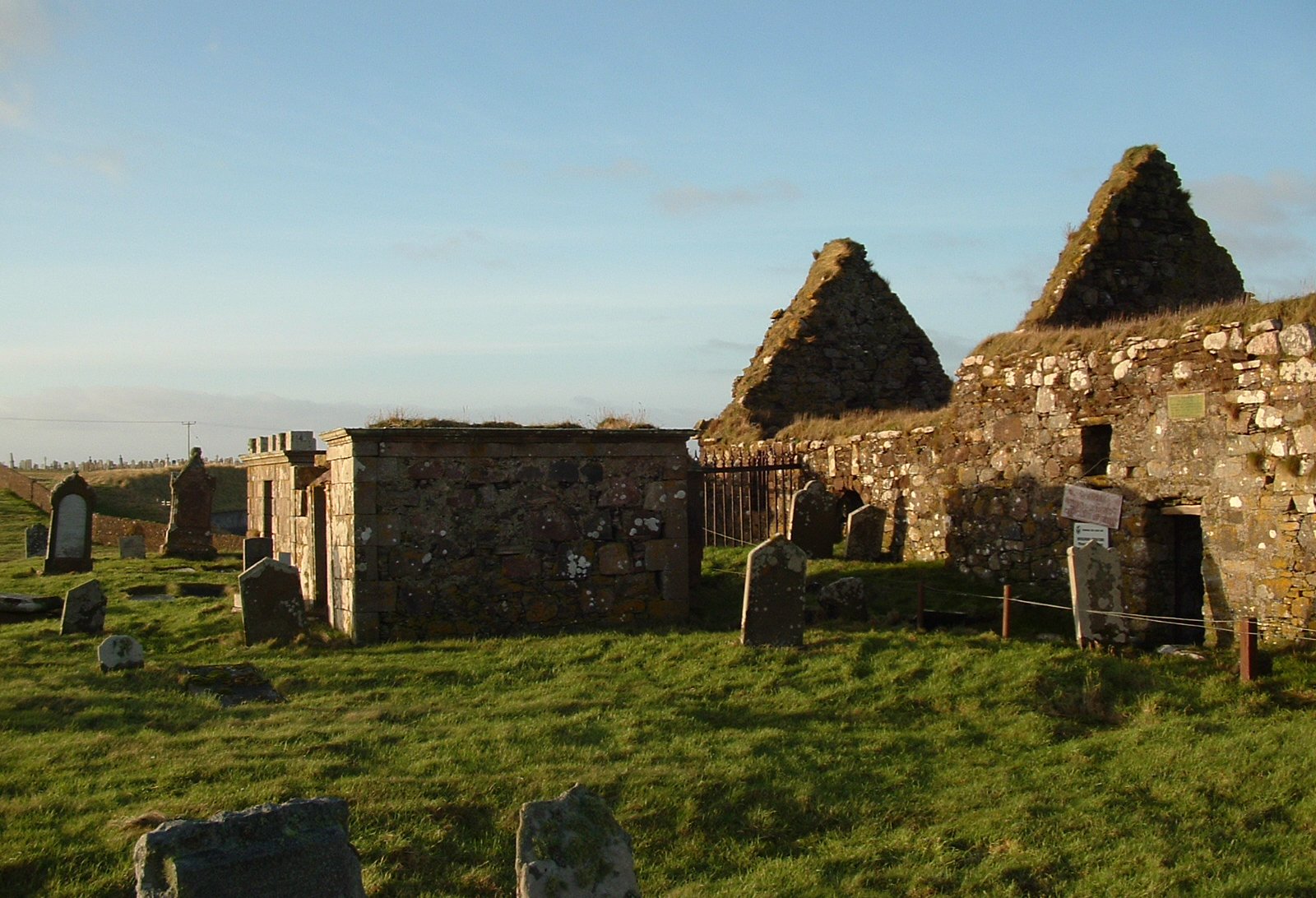
- St Columba's Church, Aignish

- Location within the Outer Hebrides
- Language: Scottish Gaelic; English
- OS grid reference: NB486324
- Civil parish: Stornoway
- Council area: Na h-Eileanan Siar
- Lieutenancy area: Western Isles
- Country: Scotland
- Sovereign state: United Kingdom
- Post town: ISLE OF LEWIS
- Postcode district: HS2
- Dialling code: 01851
- Police: Scotland
- Fire: Scottish
- Ambulance: Scottish
- UK Parliament: Na h-Eileanan an Iar
- Scottish Parliament: Na h-Eileanan an Iar

Aignish (Scottish Gaelic: Aiginis) is located northwest of Knock and east of Stornoway on the east coast of the Isle of Lewis, in the Outer Hebrides, Scotland. The township is at the island side of the isthmus connecting to the Eye peninsula. Aignish is within the parish of Stornoway, and is situated on the A866 between Stornoway and Portnaguran.

== History ==
=== Church ===
The crofting village contains the historic Ui Church (Scottish Gaelic: Eaglais na h-Aoidhe), a large pre-Reformation Church. The present church buildings are believed to be medieval, built during two separate construction phases. They were constructed on the site believed to be the cell of St Catan, a contemporary of St Columba. The church was the burial ground of the MacLeods of Lewis.

=== Land Raiders ===
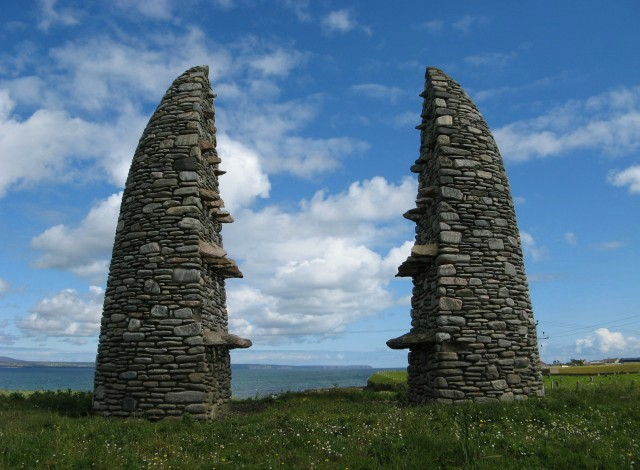
Memorial cairn

Aignish is important in the context of the history of Scottish land reform following the Aignish Riot of January 1888. This took place in the aftermath of land agitation following the groundbreaking legal victory of the Bernera Riot of 1874 and the Park deer raid of 1887. It was part of the Crofters War and involved a standoff between the local landless peasantry and the heavily armed marines that were drafted in. The courage of the people is now marked by a memorial cairn.

== Community ==
Aignish consists of a large number of houses. It is the first village entered in Point. Aignish falls into the catchment of the new Point primary school, Sgoil an Rubha, in Bayble. Bus services are available daily (except Sundays) to and from Stornoway bus station.
