= Energy Security and Net Zero Select Committee =

UK House of Commons select committee

The Energy Security and Net Zero Select Committee is a select committee of the House of Commons in the Parliament of the United Kingdom that came into existence in April 2023. It is the successor to the previous Energy and Climate Change Select Committee, which existed from 2009 to 2016. The current chair is Bill Esterson.

== Formation ==
The House of Commons agreed to the establishment of the Energy and Climate Change Select Committee on 28 October 2008, following the establishment of the Department of Energy and Climate Change on 3 October 2008. The remit of the committee is to examine the expenditure, administration and policy of the department, and any departmental bodies.

== Reformation ==
As the department was disbanded and merged with the Department for Business, Innovation and Skills, to form the Department for Business, Energy and Industrial Strategy in July 2016, the committee was also abolished. The committee was revitalised with the formation of the Department for Energy Security and Net Zero. Candidates for chair were Kirsty Blackman, Stewart Malcolm McDonald and Angus MacNeil.

== Chairs ==
Committee chairs include those listed below.

Name	Start	End	Party	Constituency
Elliot Morley	21 January 2009	6 May 2010	Labour	Scunthorpe
Tim Yeo	10 June 2010	11 June 2013	Conservative	South Suffolk
Robert Smith; Acting	11 June 2013	26 November 2013	Liberal Democrats	West Aberdeenshire and Kincardine
Tim Yeo	26 November 2013	30 March 2015	Conservative	South Suffolk
Angus MacNeil	18 June 2015	17 October 2016	Scottish National Party	Na h-Eileanan an Iar
Angus MacNeil	26 April 2023	30 May 2024	Scottish National Party (2023)	Na h-Eileanan an Iar
Angus MacNeil	26 April 2023	30 May 2024	Independent (2023–2024)	Na h-Eileanan an Iar
Bill Esterson	11 September 2024	present	Labour	Sefton Central

== Membership ==
Membership of the committee is as follows:

Member	Party	Constituency
Bill Esterson MP (chair)	Labour	Sefton Central
Christopher Chope MP	Conservative	Christchurch
Lizzi Collinge MP	Labour	Morecambe and Lunesdale
Torcuil Crichton MP	Labour	Na h-Eileanan an Iar
Graeme Downie MP	Labour	Dunfermline and Dollar
Catherine Fookes MP	Labour	Monmouthshire
Wera Hobhouse MP	Liberal Democrats	Bath
Melanie Onn MP	Labour	Great Grimsby and Cleethorpes
Mike Reader MP	Labour	Northampton South
Bradley Thomas MP	Conservative	Bromsgrove
Claire Young MP	Liberal Democrats	Thornbury and Yate

=== Changes since 2024 ===
Date	Outgoing Member & Party	Constituency	→	New Member & Party	Constituency	Source
13 January 2025	Julie Minns MP (Labour)	Carlisle	→	Mike Reader MP (Labour)	Northampton South	Hansard
17 March 2025	Josh MacAlister MP (Labour)	Whitehaven and Workington	→	Melanie Onn MP (Labour)	Great Grimsby and Cleethorpes	Hansard
3 November 2025	Anneliese Midgley MP (Labour)	Knowsley	→	Lizzi Collinge MP (Labour)	Morecambe and Lunesdale	Hansard
3 November 2025	Luke Murphy MP (Labour)	Basingstoke	→	Graeme Downie MP (Labour)	Dunfermline and Dollar	Hansard
26 October 2026	Polly Billington MP (Labour)	East Thanet	→	Catherine Fookes MP (Labour)	Monmouthshire	Hansard

== 2019-2024 Parliament ==
Angus MacNeil was elected chair on 26 April 2023. The other members of the committee were formally appointed on 12 June 2023.

Member	Party	Constituency
Angus MacNeil MP (chair)	Independent (elected as SNP)	Na h-Eileanan an Iar
Hilary Benn MP	Labour	Leeds Central
Vicky Ford MP	Conservative	Chelmsford
Barry Gardiner MP	Labour	Brent North
Mark Garnier MP	Conservative	Wyre Forest
Mark Hendrick MP	Labour	Preston
Mark Jenkinson MP	Conservative	Workington
Dan Poulter MP	Conservative	Central Suffolk and North Ipswich
Lloyd Russell-Moyle MP	Labour	Brighton Kemptown
Alexander Stafford MP	Conservative	Rother Valley

=== Changes 2019-2024 ===
Date	Outgoing Member & Party	Constituency	→	New Member & Party	Constituency	Source
19 June 2023	New seat		→	Mark Pawsey MP (Conservative)	Rugby	Hansard
20 November 2023	Hilary Benn MP (Labour)	Leeds Central	→	Mick Whitley MP (Labour)	Birkenhead	Hansard
11 December 2023	Mark Jenkinson MP (Conservative)	Workington	→	Derek Thomas MP (Conservative)	St Ives	Hansard
7 May 2024	Dan Poulter MP (Labour) (Note: Appointed as a Conservative.)	Central Suffolk and North Ipswich	→	Thérèse Coffey MP (Conservative)	Suffolk Coastal	Hansard

== Former membership ==
The membership of the committee, appointed in July 2015, was as follows:

Member	Party	Constituency
Angus MacNeil MP (chair)	Scottish National Party	Na h-Eileanan an Iar
Alistair Carmichael MP	Liberal Democrat	Orkney and Shetland
Glyn Davies MP	Conservative	Montgomeryshire
James Heappey MP	Conservative	Wells
Ian Lavery MP	Labour	Wansbeck
Melanie Onn MP	Labour	Great Grimsby
Matthew Pennycook MP	Labour	Greenwich and Woolwich
Dan Poulter MP	Conservative	Central Suffolk & North Ipswich
Antoinette Sandbach MP	Conservative	Eddisbury
Julian Sturdy MP	Conservative	York Outer
Dr Alan Whitehead MP	Labour	Southampton Test

Source: Energy and Climate Change Committee

=== Changes ===
Occasionally, the House of Commons orders changes to be made in terms of membership of select committees, as proposed by the Committee of Selection. Such changes are shown below.

Date	Outgoing Member & Party	Constituency	→	New Member & Party	Constituency	Source
2 November 2010	Gemma Doyle MP (Labour Co-op)	West Dunbartonshire	→	Barry Gardiner MP (Labour)	Brent North	Hansard
2 November 2010	Tom Greatrex MP (Labour Co-op)	Rutherglen and Hamilton West	→	Ian Lavery MP (Labour)	Wansbeck	Hansard
5 November 2012	Laura Sandys MP (Conservative)	South Thanet	→	Peter Lilley MP (Conservative)	Hitchin and Harpenden	Hansard
