= Garrabost =

Coordinates: 58.217°N 6.217°W

Garrabost: Scottish Gaelic: Garrabost
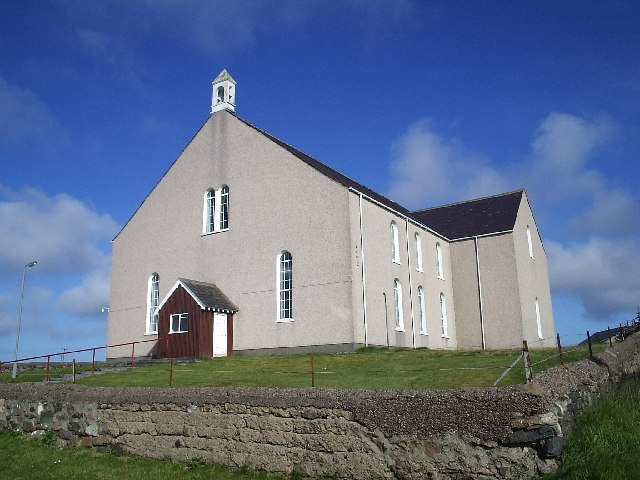
- Knock Free Church (situated in Garrabost)

- Location within the Outer Hebrides
- Language: Scottish Gaelic; English
- OS grid reference: NB523330
- Civil parish: Stornoway
- Council area: Na h-Eileanan Siar
- Lieutenancy area: Western Isles
- Country: Scotland
- Sovereign state: United Kingdom
- Post town: ISLE OF LEWIS
- Postcode district: HS2
- Dialling code: 01851
- Police: Scotland
- Fire: Scottish
- Ambulance: Scottish
- UK Parliament: Na h-Eileanan an Iar
- Scottish Parliament: Na h-Eileanan an Iar

Garrabost (Scottish Gaelic: Garrabost) is a village in the Point (An Rubha) peninsula isthmus on the east coast of the Isle of Lewis, in the Outer Hebrides, Scotland. The village is one of the largest in Point, comprising Upper and Lower Garrabost, and Claypark. Garrabost is within the civil parish of Stornoway. The church parish for Point is called Knock, and both Knock Church of Scotland and Knock Free Church of Scotland are located in Garrabost. Garrabost is situated on the A866, between Stornoway and Portnaguran.
