= Cotts baronets =

Baronetage in the United Kingdom

The Cotts Baronetcy, of Coldharbour Wood in the parish of Rogate in the County of Sussex, is a title in the Baronetage of the United Kingdom. It was created on 15 June 1921 for Sir William Cotts, KBE. He was head of Mitchell Cotts and Co, of London, and of allied companies, merchants, colliery proprietors and steamship owners, and also briefly represented Western Isles in the House of Commons as a National Liberal. The second Baronet assumed by deed poll the additional surname of Mitchell in 1932. He was an actor, writer, journalist, and publisher.

== Cotts baronets, of Coldharbour Wood (1921) ==
- Sir William Dingwall Mitchell Cotts, KBE, 1st Baronet (1871–1932)
- Sir (William) Campbell Mitchell-Cotts, 2nd Baronet (1902–1964)
- Sir Robert Crichton Mitchell Cotts, 3rd Baronet (1903–1995)
- Sir Richard Crichton Mitchell Cotts, 4th Baronet (born 1946)

The heir presumptive is the present holder's brother Hamish William Anthony Mitchell Cotts (born 1951). The heir presumptive's heir apparent is his son Campion Louis Gerard Mitchell Cotts (born 2000).
