= Broker, Lewis =

Coordinates: 58.251°N 6.163°W

Broker: Scottish Gaelic: Brocair
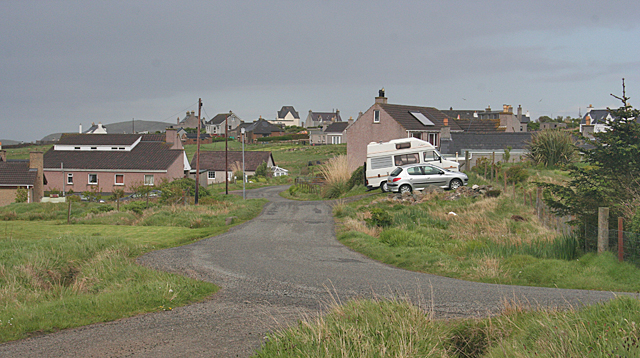
- Fleisirin, with Cnoc Amhlaigh and Brocair in the background

- Location within the Outer Hebrides
- Language: Scottish Gaelic; English
- OS grid reference: NB557366
- Civil parish: Stornoway
- Council area: Na h-Eileanan Siar
- Lieutenancy area: Western Isles
- Country: Scotland
- Sovereign state: United Kingdom
- Post town: ISLE OF LEWIS
- Postcode district: HS2
- Dialling code: 01851
- Police: Scotland
- Fire: Scottish
- Ambulance: Scottish
- UK Parliament: Na h-Eileanan an Iar
- Scottish Parliament: Na h-Eileanan an Iar

Broker (Scottish Gaelic: Brocair) is a small hamlet next to the village of Portvoller and Portnaguran on the Eye Peninsula located on the east side of the Isle of Lewis, in the Outer Hebrides, Scotland. Brocair is situated on the A866, between Stornoway and Portnaguran, and is within the parish of Stornoway.
