= Knockewart Loch =

Coordinates: 55°41′25.5″N 4°48′5.4″W

Knockewart or Loch Jargon
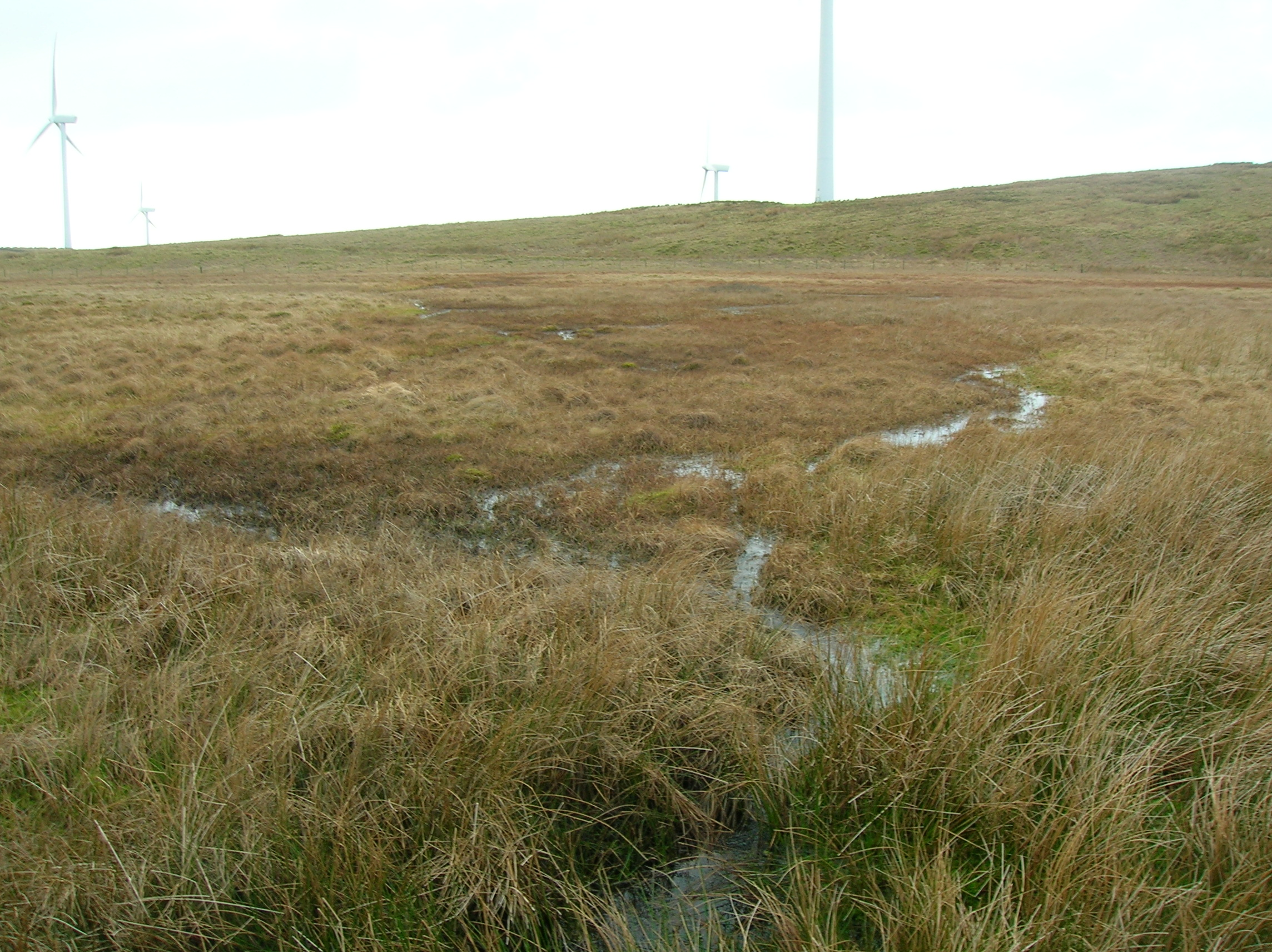
- Knockewart Loch site

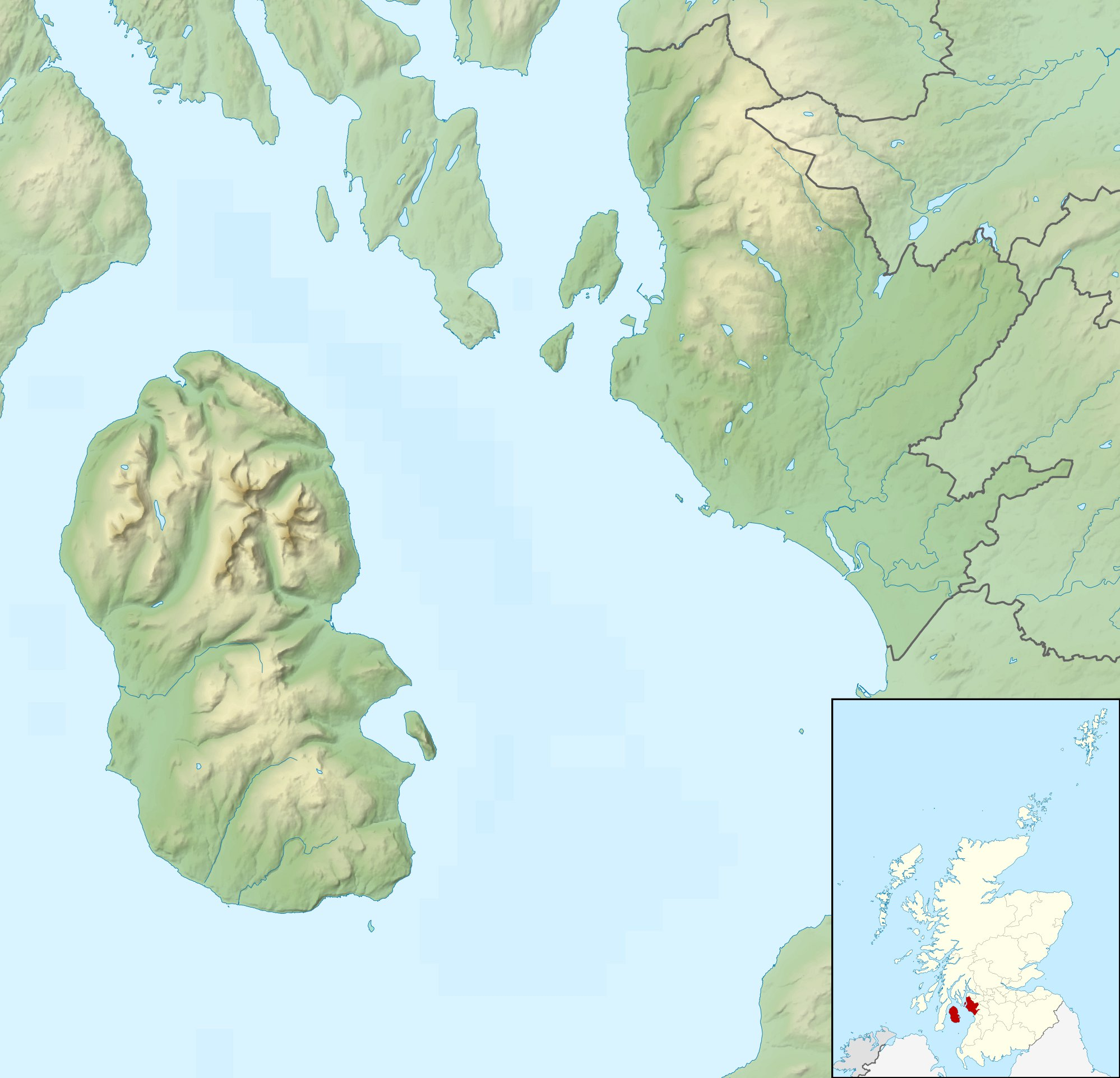
- Location within North Ayrshire
- Location: Knockewart, North Ayrshire, Scotland
- Lake type: Drained freshwater loch
- Primary inflows: Rainfall and runoff
- Primary outflows: Rowanside Burn
- Basin countries: Scotland
- Max. length: 500 m (1,600 ft)
- Max. width: 140 m (460 ft)
- Surface elevation: 188 m (617 ft)
- Islands: None
- Settlements: Ardrossan

Knockewart Loch or Loch Jargon was situated in a hollow lying area beneath Knockewart Hill in the Parish of Ardrossan, North Ayrshire, Scotland. The old loch has become largely drained and overgrown since the late 19th century.

== History ==
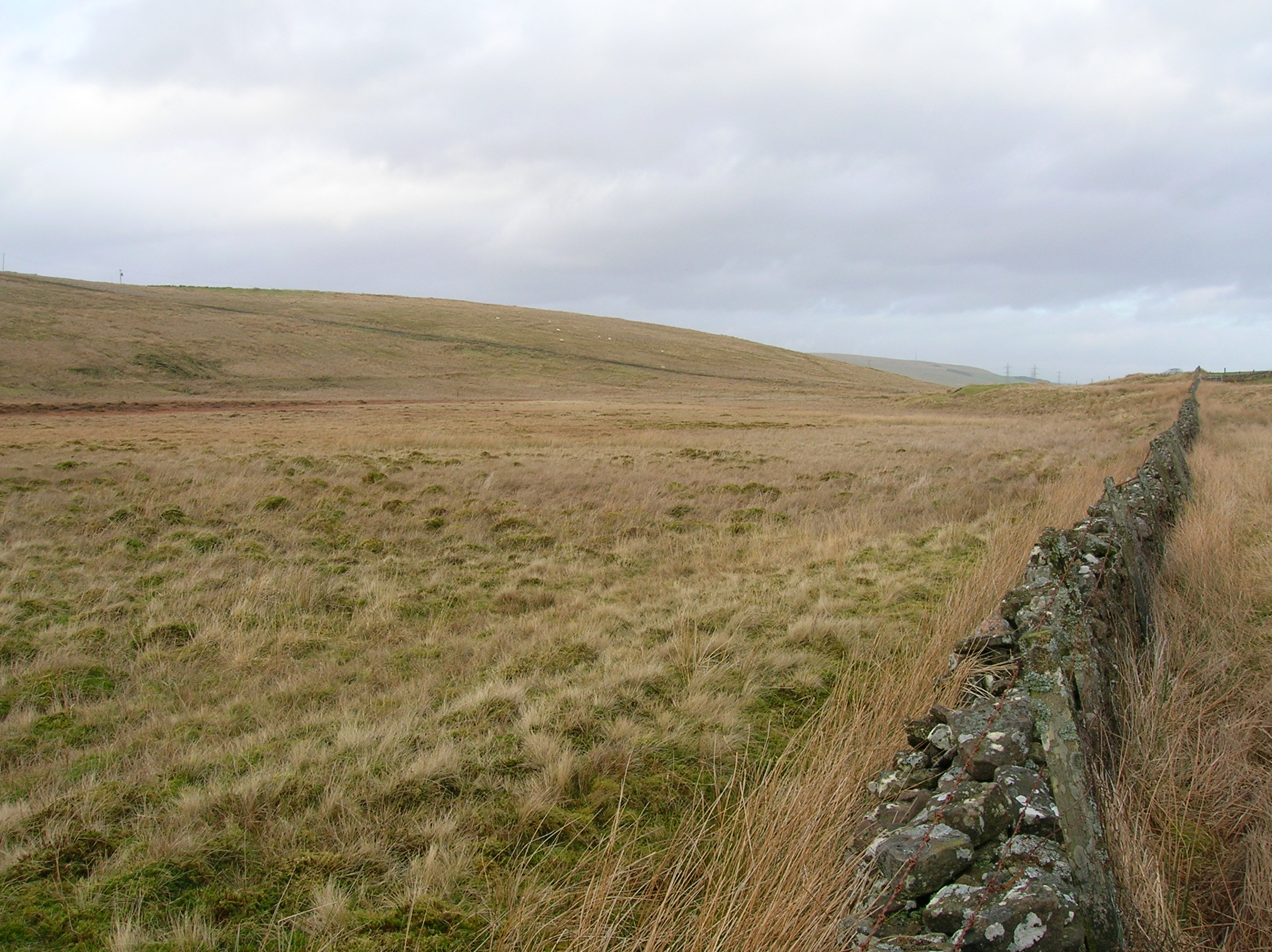
The eastern bank of the old loch.

The loch is recorded as Loch Jargon on the earlier maps after the prominent fort situated nearby. Once Knockewart Farm was established the maps use this name for it.

The Ordnance Survey Map of 1897 shows the loch as having been drained through a breaching of the natural dam bank and a significant deepening of the outflow for a distance of a hundred metres or so.

In 1858 Fullarton records that it was once a haunt of pike, however, the accumulation of vegetable matter in the bed of their domain made it unlikely that pike could survive and that it was now an excellent site for the breeding of wild ducks. By 1876 Dobie records that the loch has nearly dried up and is little more than a swamp. In 1887 the Natural History Society of Glasgow had an excursion to West Kilbride and observed in their transactions that 'the party reached Knockewart Loch, a small sheet of water which is now almost wholly covered with a growth of surface vegetation.

The loch's drainage may have begun in the 18th century when Alexander Montgomerie, 10th Earl of Eglinton, was pursuing a number of agricultural improvements on his extensive estates and other landowners followed his example. Intensive drainage work may have taken place as part of the improvements undertaken to provide employment for Irish estate workers during the Irish potato famines of the mid-19th century. Many drainage schemes also date to the end of World War I when many soldiers returned en masse to civilian life.

Busbie Muir Reservoir was constructed in the glen beneath the loch, opening in 1903. The loch's outfall water still drain into it before continuing as the Rowanside Burn, joining the Stanley Burn, flowing over the aqueduct at the Parkhouse Cutting and running into the sea at Ardrossan South Beach. The reservoir is now used by the Ardrossan Eglinton Angling Club.

=== Prehistory ===
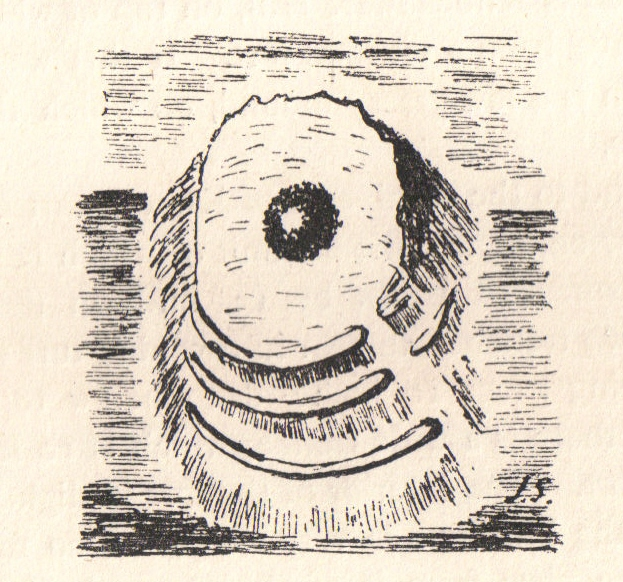
Knock Jargon Fort.

A cairn and possible vitrified fort are located at North Hill in the Knockewart Hill (NS 2387 4806). An enclosure (NS 2356 4812) is located near rising ground that has the appearance of having once been cleared of stone and cultivated. No field plots or clearance heaps are identifiable. A well-preserved fort is present at Knock Jargon, upon a rock outcrop with steep sides. Surrounding the summit are the remains of two ramparts and ditches constructed upon the slopes, best preserved on the south side where each is broken by an entrance. Campbell records that Knockjargon is built upon a Neolithic hilltop burial cairn. Cup-and-ring marked stones are to be found at nearby Blackshaw Hill. Smith records the name 'Knock-Georgan'. A fort with a double ditch cut from rock is located near Coalhill.

=== Lairds ===
Knook-Ewart (sic) belonged after the Battle of Largs, to the Crawfurds of Auchnames; subsequently it came into the possession of the Mures of Caldwell. In 1713 John Simson of Kirkton-hall, parish of Kilbride, purchased the property; he was the father of Dr Robert Simson, professor of mathematics in the University of Glasgow. The professor never married, and the estate was purchased from his representative, in 1787, by James Montgomerie, Esq., a magistrates of Irvine, a descendant of Adam Montgomerie of Broadstane near Beith. On his death, it was inherited by his eldest daughter, Mary, who married Captain John Brooks, of the 20th regiment, who became proprietor in right of his wife.

=== Cartographic evidence ===
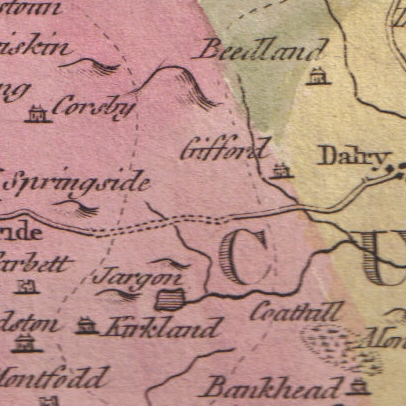
Aiton's map of 1811.

Blaeu's map of 1654, dating from Timothy Pont's survey of circa 1604, clearly shows the loch and erroneously indicates that its outflow entered the sea near Montfode. A dwelling named 'Iargan' is recorded and a 'Knokawart'. Herman Moll's map of 1745 marks, but does not name the loch. Roy's map of 1747 shows and names 'Loch Jargen', situated without an inflow burn. Armstrong's map of 1775 does not show the loch, but Knock Jargon fort is clearly marked. William Aiton's map of 1811 shows a loch at Jargon, however, the outflow runs in entirely the wrong direction. Thomson's map of 1832 marks and records Loch Jargon.

The 1854-9 Ordnance Survey map show the loch as open water with small areas of woodland above and below. In 2011 the drainage here remains inadequate and the area is dominated by marsh plants.

=== Etymology ===
Knockjargon is a distinctive and ancient name as indicated by evidence from old maps. The word 'Jargoun' in Scots, dating from as early as 1340–70, refers to the twittering or chattering of birds. Knock is from the Gaelic, An Cnoc, refers to a small hill, and as such often fortified.

== Natural history ==
The old loch is a designated wildlife site, surveyed by the Scottish Wildlife Trust in 1982, with the following observations - "The loch, which is now completely vegetated being covered in a sphagnum carpet, is extremely interesting. It supports a number of plant communities and a diversity of plant species including cotton grass, bottle sedge and various mosses, especially Polytrichum commune. The margins are dominated by sharp-flowered rush and the wetland area grades out to dry land where soft rush and grasses dominate."

The site is well suited to birds of prey, snipe and curlew. Willow warbler, tawny owl, chaffinch have been recorded and roe deer are present, together with common lizard and frog. Botanically the site is dominated by sphagnum mosses and heathers with the carnivorous sundew commonly encountered. The roe deer have prevented regeneration of the areas of woodland.

Previous location of Knockewart Loch, North Ayrshire

== Micro-history ==
The fishing rights on the Rowanside and Stanley Burns were held by the Earls of Eglinton and at one time reservoirs were also present at Whitlees, Parkhouse and Millglen.

Coalhill is named from the coal that was once mined on its eastern edge.
