= Donald Stewart (Scottish politician) =

Scottish politician

The Right Honourable Donald Stewart

President of the Scottish National Party
- In office 1982–1987
- Preceded by: William Wolfe
- Succeeded by: Winnie Ewing

Member of Parliament for Western Isles
- In office 18 June 1970 – 18 May 1987
- Preceded by: Malcolm Macmillan
- Succeeded by: Calum MacDonald

Personal details
- Born: 17 October 1920 Stornoway, Western Isles, Scotland
- Died: 23 August 1992 (aged 71) Stornoway, Western Isles, Scotland
- Party: Scottish National Party
- Other political affiliations: Labour (1937–39)
- Spouse: Christina Macaulay (m. 1955)

Donald James Stewart (17 October 1920 – 23 August 1992) was Scottish National Party (SNP) Member of Parliament (MP) from 1970-87 for the Western Isles. He also served as President of the Scottish National Party from 1982-87. He was a councillor in Stornoway for many years and twice served as the town's provost.

== Early life ==
Stewart was born on 17 October 1920 in Stornoway, Western Isles, Scotland. He was educated at the Nicolson Institute. Stewart left school at sixteen years of age to work as a junior clerk in a local solicitor's office, before going on to work in the office of Kenneth Mackenzie Ltd, a Stornoway Harris Tweed firm. He saw active service during the Second World War with the Royal Navy, serving on the corvette HMS Celandine for the duration of the war. Following the war, he returned to Kenneth Mackenzie Ltd, eventually becoming a director. He remained with the firm until his election to Parliament in 1970.

== Political career ==
A lifelong socialist, Stewart became convinced of the case for Scottish independence at the 1935 United Kingdom general election, and joined the Scottish National Party the following year. He also joined the Labour Party in 1937, but became disillusioned with the party and left in 1939. He was first elected to Stornoway Town Council in 1951, and remained a councillor until his election to Parliament nineteen years later in 1970. He stood at the 1952 Dundee East by-election. Stewart was the provost of Stornoway from 1959–65, and again from 1968-70. At the 1970 general election, he was the SNP's first ever MP returned at a general election, and the last declared result in 1970, which caused great attention in the media.

Stewart was the SNP's sole Westminster representative from 1970 until he was joined by Margo MacDonald who won Glasgow Govan at the by-election of 1973. At the February 1974 general election he was joined by six other SNP MPs, and at the October general election later that year, the SNP returned a record eleven MPs. Stewart became the SNP parliamentary group leader, with William Wolfe as the Scottish National Party leader. In 1977, Donald Stewart was appointed as a Privy Counsellor.

When Robin Cook MP moved an amendment to legalise homosexual acts to the Bill which became the Criminal Justice (Scotland) Act 1980, he stated "The clause bears the names of hon. Members from all three major parties. I regret that the only party represented among Scottish Members of Parliament from which there has been no support for the clause is the Scottish National Party. I am pleased to see both representatives of that party in their place, and I hope to convert them in the remainder of my remarks." When the amendment came to a vote, Stewart and the SNP's other MP Gordon Wilson both voted against the decriminalisation of homosexual acts.

In 1981, Stewart attempted to introduce some provisions for Gaelic through a private members bill, but it was met with hostility from the Conservatives and talked out by Bill Walker. It was only with the introduction of the Gaelic Language (Scotland) Act 2005 by the devolved Scottish Parliament, that the language was afforded some official recognition.

In March 1985, Stewart announced he would retire from frontline politics at the next election, although he continued to represent the Western Isles until 1987. At the 1987 general election, his successor as SNP candidate, Ian Smith, then the party's Spokesman on Transport; was defeated by Calum MacDonald of the Labour Party. The SNP vote dropped by 26% and the constituency saw an SNP to Labour swing of 19.6% in what was included by election analysts David Butler and Robert Waller as among the "exceptional results" seen in "individual constituencies" in that election. Labour held it until the 2005 general election when it was regained by Angus MacNeil of the SNP.

Upon his retirement from Parliament, Stewart was offered a Life Peerage, but declined. Stewart was working on an autobiography at the time of his death in 1992. It was edited and completed by his sister, and published in 1994 as A Scot in Westminster.

It was Stewart who famously described the SNP as a "radical party, with a revolutionary aim".

== Personal life ==
He married Christina MacAulay.

In August 1992 he suffered a heart attack. He died a week later, aged 71, at Lewis hospital, Stornoway.

Parliament of the United Kingdom
Preceded by Malcolm Macmillan	Member of Parliament for the Western Isles; 1970–1987	Succeeded by Calum MacDonald
Party political offices
Preceded by William Wolfe	President of the Scottish National Party; 1982–1987	Succeeded by Winnie Ewing
