= Torcuil Crichton =

Scottish politician

Torcuil Crichton MP
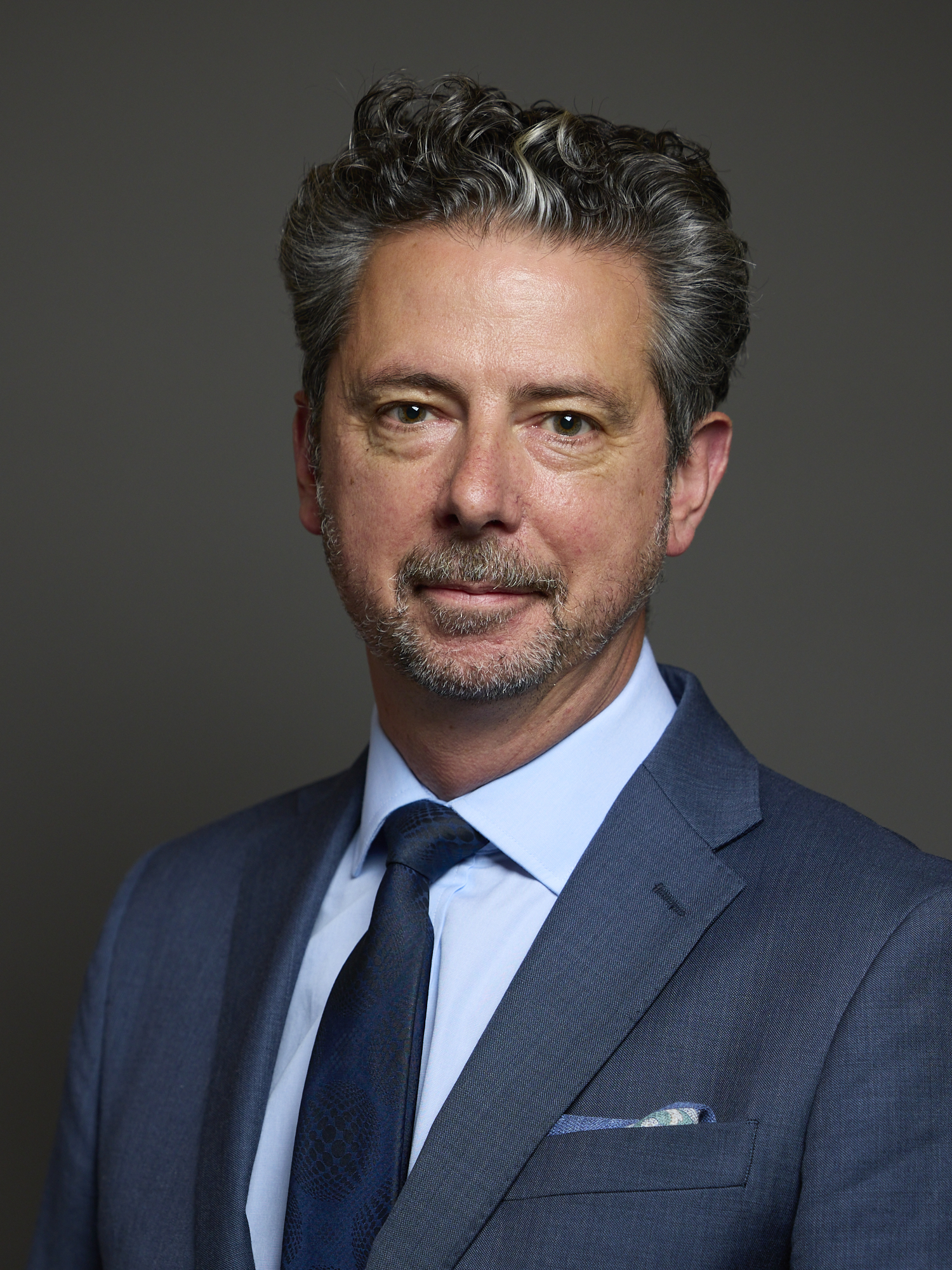
- Official portrait, 2024

Member of Parliament for Na h-Eileanan an Iar
- Incumbent
- Assumed office 4 July 2024
- Preceded by: Angus MacNeil
- Majority: 3,836 (28.4%)

Personal details
- Born: December 1964 (age 61) Isle of Lewis, Scotland
- Party: Labour
- Website: www.torcuilmp.com

Torcuil Crichton (born December 1964) is a Scottish Labour Party politician who has served as the Member of Parliament (MP) for Na h-Eileanan an Iar since 2024. He previously worked as a journalist and Gaelic broadcaster.

== Journalism career ==
Crichton was born in December 1964. He is from Swordale in Point, Isle of Lewis, where he grew up. He attended Knock primary school.

He worked as a journalist with the West Highland Free Press, and subsequently for the Daily Record for 12 years, leaving his role as Westminster editor in 2022. He has also worked for the Herald and Sunday Herald, as well as the BBC, for whom he made a Gaelic TV documentary, broadcast on BBC Alba, on Donald Trump's mother Mary Anne MacLeod's journey from the Isle of Lewis to America, Mathair a' Chinn-Suidhe – Trump's Mother.

He co-wrote the Gaelic TV drama Eilbheas which first aired on BBC Alba in 2008 and received a Bafta Scotland nomination. He has also written a teenage novel, Fo Bhruid, a modern Gaelic retelling of Kidnapped by Robert Louis Stevenson.

Along with Malcolm Maclean he devised a temporary art installation, Sheòl an Iolaire, as a memorial marking the 100th anniversary of the sinking of HMY Iolaire, with the loss of 201 men, on 1 January 1919. As of 2024 the memorial remains in place in Stornoway harbour.

== Political career ==
He was selected as a Labour parliamentary candidate in January 2023, and elected in the 2024 general election.

On entering parliament, he took the Oath of Allegiance in Gaelic using a Gaelic Bible.

At the 2026 State Opening of Parliament by King Charles III, Crichton resumed former MP for Bolsover Dennis Skinner's tradition of a topical comment during the entrance of Black Rod into the House of Commons. Crichton remarked "Not now Andy." when Gentleman Usher of the Black Rod Lieutenant General Ed Davis struck the door, in reference to then-speculation of Greater Manchester Mayor Andy Burnham re-running for Parliament and challenging Prime Minister Keir Starmer in a leadership contest.

== Family ==
He has a brother, Donald, who stood as the Labour candidate for Na h-Eileanan an Iar in the 2011 Scottish Parliament election, coming second to Alasdair Allan.

== Bibliography ==
- Fo Bhruid (Stòrlann, 2010) ISBN 9781907054396

Parliament of the United Kingdom
Preceded by Angus MacNeil	Member of Parliament for Na h-Eileanan an Iar; 2024–present	Incumbent
