= Campbell Cotts =

British actor (1902–1964)

Sir Campbell Cotts Bt
- 1957 portrait
- Born: William Campbell Cotts; 21 April 1902; Fondebosch, Cape Colony
- Died: 19 February 1964 (aged 61); London, England
- Other names: Sir William Campbell Mitchell-Cotts, 2nd Baronet
- Occupations: Actor, writer, barrister
- Years active: 1947–1962

Campbell Cotts (21 April 1902 – 19 February 1964) was a Cape Colony-born actor of British stage, film and television. A former barrister and a published poet, Cotts studied at Cambridge and fought in Second World War, attaining the rank of 1st Lieutenant in the Black Watch (Royal Highland Regiment). His acting roles included a Broadway appearance opposite Katharine Hepburn in a revival of Shaw's The Millionairess at the Shubert Theatre in 1952.

== Selected filmography ==
- Fame Is the Spur (1947)
- The Brass Monkey (1948)
- The Idol of Paris (1948)
- Trottie True (1949)
- Stop Press Girl (1949)
- Dear Mr. Prohack (1949)
- Last Holiday (1950)
- The Angel with the Trumpet (1950)
- My Seal and Them (1951)
- The Hour of 13 (1952)
- Barbados Quest (1955)
- Three Men in a Boat (1956)
- Just My Luck (1957)
- The Good Companions (1957)

== Bibliography ==
- Steve Chibnall. J. Lee Thompson. Manchester University Press, 2000.

Baronetage of the United Kingdom
| Preceded by William Cotts | Baronet (of Coldharbour Wood); 1932–1964 | Succeeded by Robert Cotts |
