= Murdo Macfarlane =

- Murchadh MacPhàrlain, Bàrd Mhealboist
- Born: 15 February 1901; Melbost, Lewis, Outer Hebrides, Scotland
- Died: 7 November 1982 (aged 81); Tong, Lewis, Lewis, Outer Hebrides, Scotland
- Citizenship: United Kingdom
- Occupation: Crofting
- Writing career
- Language: Scottish Gaelic
- Genre: Poetry
- Notable work: Cànan nan Gàidheal

Murdo Macfarlane (15 February 1901—7 November 1982; Scottish Gaelic: Murchadh MacPhàrlain) known as Bàrd Mhealboist ("the Melbost Bard") was a published poet, songwriter and campaigner for Scottish Gaelic, especially during the 1970s, when the Ceartas movement was gaining strength.

== Life ==
Born and brought up in Melbost, Isle of Lewis, he was taught Latin, English and French but received no education in Gaelic, his mother tongue. He spent some time working for Lord Leverhulme on various schemes but eventually left to travel to North America in the 1920s and spent many years in Manitoba but did not like the place. In 1932 he returned to Scotland and went on to national service in World War II during the years 1942–1945. Following the end of the war he spent the rest of his life in Lewis and never married. He was also a strong campaigner against the enlargement of Stornoway Airport into a NATO base in the 1970s. In 1979 he was made an honorary vice-president of An Comunn Gàidhealach, an organisation that promotes the teaching and use of Gaelic.

Macfarlane died on 7 November 1982 at age 81 at Tong on Lewis.

He is the subject of a BBC documentary 'Murchadh MacPharlain; Bard Mhealaboist' which won the Celtic Film and Television Festival Award for best Arts documentary in 2001.

== Works ==
In the 1970s, with the Gaelic Resurgence, Murchadh wrote many poems, songs and pipe tunes for the cause, such as Cànan nan Gàidheal, Òran Cogaidh, Màl na Mara, and Mi le m' Uillin air Mo Ghlùin. Allan MacDonald, in his pipe book A' Cheud Ceud, refers to Murchadh as the Crann Tara of the Gaelic Movement.

His poetry was taken up by a young band Na h-Òganaich in the 1970s. This exposure led to bands such as Runrig and Capercaillie being inspired by his work.

In 1974, Macfarlane wrote the song "Cànan nan Gàidheal" ("Language of the Gaels") which criticized the tendency of Gaels to switch to English. The song has been recorded by Dick Gaughan, Catherine-Ann MacPhee, Karen Matheson, Tannas, Dan ar Braz and Tide Lines. An Irish-language version, "Teangaidh na nGael" or "Teanga na nGael", has been recorded by the Irish group Cór Thaobh a' Leithid and by the singer/songwriter Gráinne Holland. An instrumental version was recorded by Scottish fiddler Duncan Chisholm.
