= Knock, Isle of Lewis =

Coordinates: 58.205°N 06.27°W

Knock: Scottish Gaelic: An Cnoc
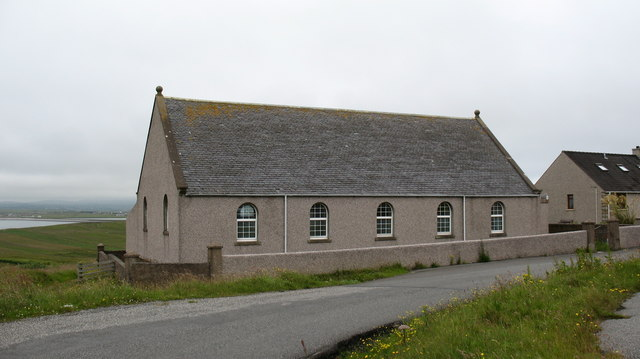
- Church at Knock

- Location within the Outer Hebrides
- OS grid reference: NB4931
- Council area: Na h-Eileanan Siar
- Lieutenancy area: Western Isles
- Country: Scotland
- Sovereign state: United Kingdom
- Post town: ISLE OF LEWIS
- Postcode district: HS2
- Dialling code: 01851
- Police: Scotland
- Fire: Scottish
- Ambulance: Scottish
- UK Parliament: Na h-Eileanan an Iar
- Scottish Parliament: Na h-Eileanan an Iar

Knock, from the Gaelic, An Cnoc (a small hill), is a village in Point peninsula on the Isle of Lewis in the Outer Hebrides of Scotland. Point (an Rubha in Gaelic) is connected by road across a narrow isthmus (barely 100 metres wide) to Stornoway, the main administrative centre of the Western Isles.

The village of Knock consists of between fifty and one hundred houses and is bordered to the south with Swordale and to the north with Aignish.

Knock used to have a primary school and post office. The post office closed in 2008 along with many other post offices in the north west of Scotland.

Knock Primary school opened on 29 October 1878 and closed for the last time on 30 June 2011 when the pupils were moved to a new school in Bayble. The old school is now a locally run shop and café "Buth an Rubha & Cafe Roo" selling a wide range of everyday essentials and local produce. It opened on 7 March 2014.

There is another village called Knock, in the district of Carloway, in the Uig Parish of Lewis.

== Church ==
A church was established here in 1829 by Act of Parliament and served as a quoad sacra church, supplementing existing churches and reducing the distance people needed to walk to get to the former church. In the Disruption of 1843 a high proportion left the established church to create Knock Free church (which is actually located in Garrabost).

== Notable people ==
Rev Roderick Macleod, minister of Knock, Moderator of the General Assembly of the Free Church of Scotland in 1921.
