= Thomas Ramsay =

Thomas Bridgehill Wilson Ramsay (2 July 1877 – 20 October 1956) was a Scottish Liberal Party, and National Liberal Party politician and Member of Parliament (MP).

== Family and education ==
Ramsay was the son of A. W. Ramsay of Ayr. He was studied law at the University of Edinburgh graduating with an MA and LLB. He does not seem to have ever married.

== Career ==
Ramsay practiced law in London and was called to the Bar by Gray's Inn in 1910. He was sometime president of the Debating Society and as his practice developed he specialised in appeals to the Judicial Committee of the Privy Council.

== Scottish heritage ==
According to reports Ramsay was always a keen proponent of his native country Scotland, its institutions and traditions. He was sometime President and Chief of the Scottish Clans Association of London; a trustee and Elder and Session Clerk of St Columba's Church, in Pont Street, Knightsbridge and was Treasurer and Convener of the Maintenance of the Ministry Fund of the Church of Scotland in England. He was also a life member of many Scottish societies.

== Politics ==
Ramsay's first attempt to enter Parliament came at the 1922 general election when he stood as a Lloyd George National Liberal candidate in the Glasgow Shettleston constituency.

Ramsay did not stand for election at the general elections of 1923 or 1924 but was adopted as candidate for the Liberal seat of Western Isles at the 1929 general election when the sitting MP Alexander Livingstone announced he was standing down. At the election Ramsay faced a three-cornered contest against Labour's John Macdiarmid, a retired railway auditor and Unionist candidate Captain Ian Moffat-Pender, a former Scottish Rugby international. Ramsay held the seat for the Liberals with a majority of 1,288 votes over Labour, with the Tories in third place.

Ramsay seems to have been an assiduous member of the House of Commons. It was reported in The Times newspaper that he put in the most attendances at divisions for the Liberal Party in 1930 with 441 attendances out of a possible 484.

== National Liberal ==
In 1931 an economic crisis led to the formation of a National Government led by Labour prime minister Ramsay MacDonald and initially supported by the Conservative and Liberal parties. However the Liberals were increasingly divided over the issue of the National Government, particularly over the issue Free Trade. The official party led by Sir Herbert Samuel became more and more worried about the government's stance on Free Trade and worried about the predominance of the Conservatives in the coalition. However a group of Liberal MPs led by Sir John Simon who were concerned to ensure the National Government had a wide cross-party base formed the Liberal National Party to more openly support MacDonald's administration. Ramsay became one of the founder members of this group and thereafter sat in the House of Commons as a Liberal National.

He held his seat at the 1931 general election in a straight fight with Moffat-Pender for the Conservatives. At the 1935 general election, Ramsay was not opposed by an official Liberal candidate or his Unionist coalition partners, but he was faced by Labour's Malcolm Macmillan and an Independent candidate representing the Scottish National Party, Sir Alexander MacEwen. Macmillan won the seat with a majority of 1,345 votes and at 22 years of age became the youngest member of the House of Commons.

Ramsay was one of the possible National candidates for the by-election which occurred in Ross and Cromarty when Sir Ian Macpherson announced he was to stand down on medical advice. In the event the constituency chose Malcolm MacDonald the son of the Prime Minister to contest the by-election. Ramsay did not stand for election again.

== Death ==
Ramsay died in London on 20 October 1956, aged 79 years. A memorial service was held for him at St Columba's Church in Pont Street on 13 November 1956 at which his sister was the chief mourner. The service was officiated by the Moderator of the Church of Scotland the Right Reverend Dr R. F. V. Scott.

== Sources ==
- Leigh Rayment's Historical List of MPs – Constituencies beginning with "W" (part 2)
- Craig, F. W. S. (1983) [1969]. British parliamentary election results 1918–1949 (3rd ed.). Chichester: Parliamentary Research Services. ISBN 978-0-900178-06-1.

Parliament of the United Kingdom
Preceded by Alexander Livingstone	Member of Parliament for Western Isles; 1929–1935	Succeeded by Malcolm Macmillan
