= Alexander Livingstone (British politician) =

Sir Alexander McKenzie Livingstone MP
- McKenzie Livingstone, circa 1922

Member of Parliament for Western Isles
- In office 6 December 1923 – 10 May 1929
- Preceded by: Sir William Cotts
- Succeeded by: Thomas Ramsey

Personal details
- Born: 18 October 1880
- Died: 14 September 1950 (aged 69)
- Party: Liberal

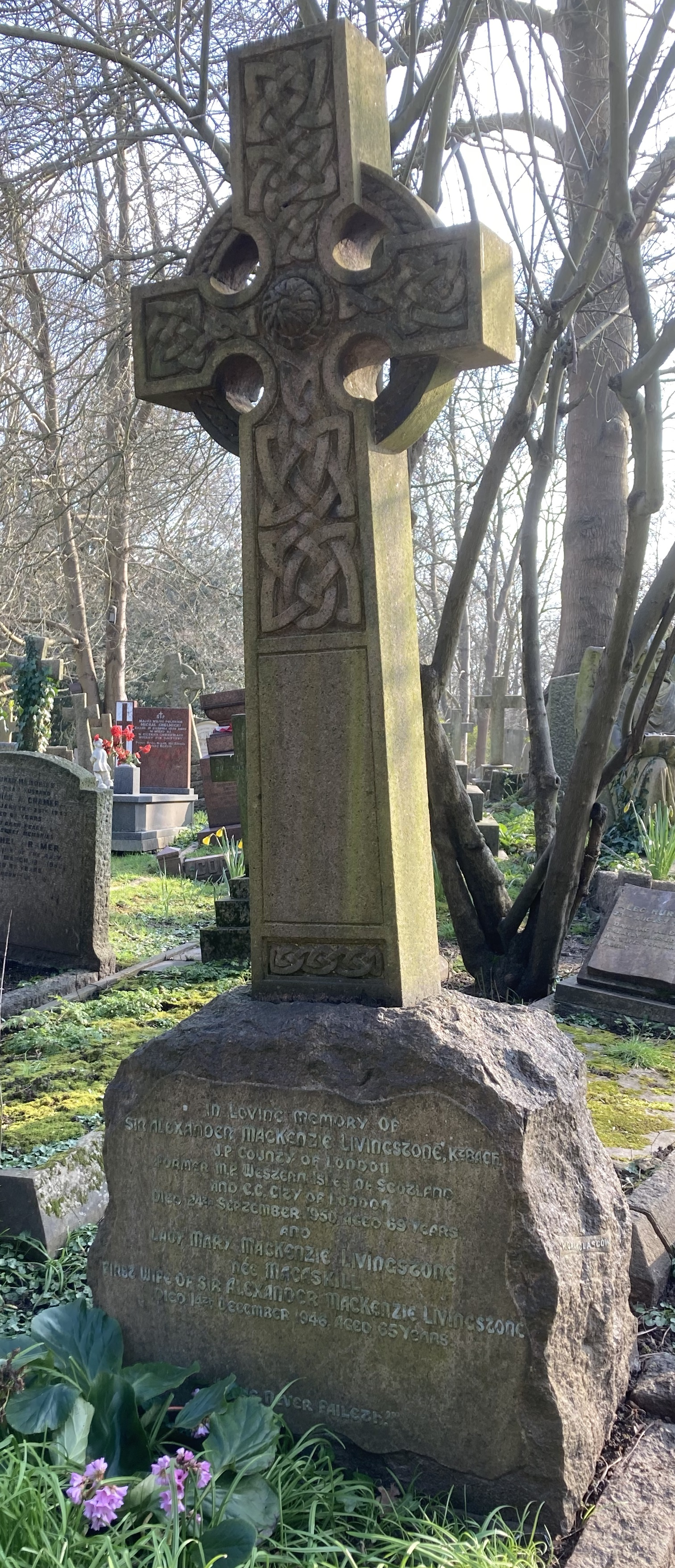
Grave of Sir Alexander MacKenzie Livingstone in Highgate Cemetery (east side)

Sir Alexander McKenzie Livingstone (18 October 1880 – 14 September 1950) was a Scottish Liberal Party politician.

== Early years ==
Livingstone was born in Kelvin, Glasgow in October 1880 to Duncan Livingstone and Catherine McKenzie.

== Political career ==
At the 1918 general election, he was an unsuccessful candidate in the Dover constituency. He was again unsuccessful at the 1922 general election, when he stood in Inverness.

Livingstone was elected to Parliament on his third attempt, at the 1923 general election, when he was returned as member of parliament for the Western Isles. He held the seat at the 1924 election, and stood down from Parliament at the 1929 general election.

He was the Whip of the 'Radical' Parliamentary Group, formed in opposition to the leadership of David Lloyd George. He declared himself unable to endorse the Liberal Unemployment Pledge, and consequently withdrew in 1929 as Liberal candidate for the Western Isles. He joined the Labour Party in 1930.

== Death ==
Livingstone died in Islington, London in September 1950 at the age of 69 and is buried in a family grave at Highgate Cemetery.

Parliament of the United Kingdom
Preceded by Sir William Cotts	Member of Parliament for Western Isles; 1923–1929	Succeeded by Thomas Ramsay
