= Melbost =

Coordinates: 58.211°N 6.319°W

Melbost: Scottish Gaelic: Mealabost
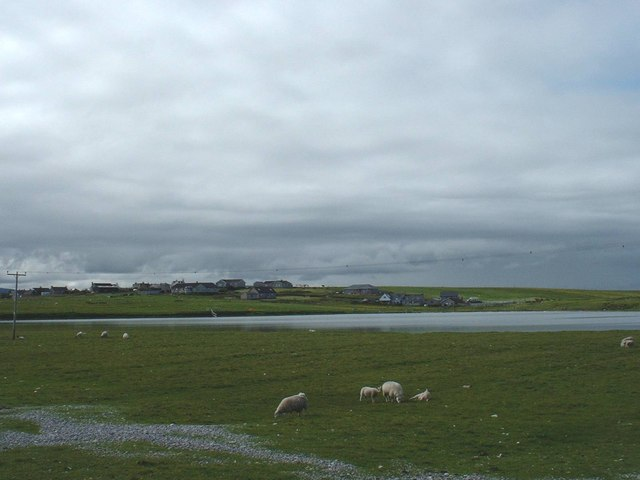
- Loch Bràigh na h-Aoidhe, with Melbost and Stornoway Airport beyond

- Location within the Outer Hebrides
- Language: Scottish Gaelic; English
- OS grid reference: NB463327
- Civil parish: Stornoway
- Council area: Na h-Eileanan Siar
- Country: Scotland
- Sovereign state: United Kingdom
- Post town: ISLE OF LEWIS
- Postcode district: HS2
- Dialling code: 01851
- Police: Scotland
- Fire: Scottish
- Ambulance: Scottish
- UK Parliament: Na h-Eileanan an Iar
- Scottish Parliament: Na h-Eileanan an Iar

Melbost (Scottish Gaelic: Mealabost) is a traditionally Gaelic-speaking village in Point on the east coast of the Isle of Lewis, in Scotland's north-west. It is largely a crofting township and is about 2 1/2 miles (4 kilometres) east of Stornoway at the head of an isthmus connecting with the Eye Peninsula. Melbost is technically in the district of Point; however, it is not located on the Eye Peninsula itself. The RAF Stornoway war memorial is located in the village.

== Culture ==
The Gaelic poet Murdo Macfarlane (Scottish Gaelic: Murchadh MacPhàrlain) known as 'Bàrd Mhealaboist' (the Melbost Bard) was a published poet and campaigner for Scottish Gaelic who was born and brought up in Melbost. He is famous for the song Cànan nan Gàidheal.

== See also ==
- Lewis and Harris
- History of the Outer Hebrides
