= Iain Moffat-Pender =

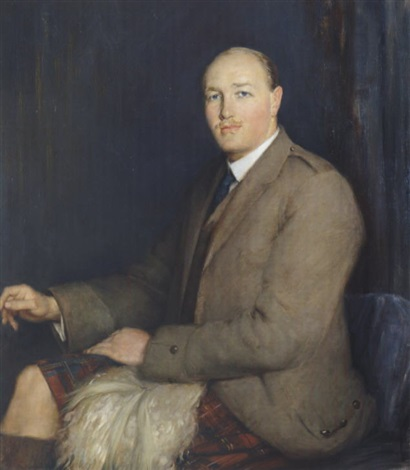
- Full name: John MacAlister Moffat-Pender
- Born: 18 August 1894 Ockham, Surrey, England
- Died: 13 October 1961 (aged 67) Glasgow, Scotland
- University: University of Edinburgh
- Occupation: Writer / Poet

Rugby union career
- Position: Forward
International career
Years	Team	Apps	(Points)
1914	Scotland	1	(0)

John MacAlister "Iain" Moffat-Pender (18 August 1894 — 13 October 1961) was a Scottish writer, poet, Gaelic revivalist and international rugby union player. He wrote Gaelic-language poems on Jacobite themes.

== Biography ==
Born to Scottish parents in Ockham, Surrey, Moffat-Pender grew up in Scotland and was a rugby union forward during his youth, culminating in him being capped for the national team against England in a 1914 Calcutta Cup match at Inverleith.

Moffat-Pender served in France as a Captain with the Seaforth Highlanders in World War I, over the course of which he was wounded three times. It was during this time that he developed his interest in the Gaelic language. He learned Gaelic through interacting with soldiers from the Isle of Lewis, where he moved after being decommissioned to immerse himself in the language, while also studying at the University of Edinburgh under the tutelage of William J. Watson.

As a Unionist Party candidate, Moffat-Pender attempted to enter British parliament on three occasions. He contested the 1929 and 1931 general elections for the Western Isles constituency, as well as the 1929 Wansbeck by-election. The closest he came to being elected was in 1931 when he fell 1,000 votes short of incumbent MP Thomas Ramsay of the National Liberal Party.

Moffat-Pender lived in Australia from 1931 until World War II and was a successful sheep farmer.

In 1956, Moffat-Pender won the Bardic Crown at the Largs Mòd for his epic poem "The Eve of the Battle of Largs".

== See also ==
- List of Scotland national rugby union players
