= William Cotts =

Scottish businessman and Liberal politician (1871 – 1932)

- William Cotts
- Born: 15 July 1871
- Died: 20 January 1932 (aged 60)
- Occupations: Businessman and Politician

Sir William Dingwall Mitchell Cotts, 1st Baronet, KBE (15 July 1871 – 20 January 1932) was a Scottish businessman and Liberal politician.

== Personal life and career ==
Cotts was born at Sanquhar in Scotland, the son of William Cotts. He was educated privately and at Wallace Hall. On 18 March 1901, he married Agnes Sloane who was also from Sanquhar and they had two sons and a daughter. Cotts obtained his early business training in Dumfries and London and went in 1895 to South Africa, where he developed important business interests, realising the potential of the Natal coalfields and the transport and other infrastructure that was needed to support the coal and gold mining industries. He also had business interests in Britain and was sometime head of Mitchell, Cotts & Co. of London. The company traded as general merchants, owned collieries and steamships.

== Political and public life ==
Cotts contested the Western Isles constituency at the 1918 general election as a Coalition Liberal but narrowly failed to take the seat which was won by an Independent Liberal, Dr Donald Murray with a majority of 390 votes. Cotts fought Murray for the seat again in 1922 standing as a National Liberal, i.e. a supporter of the David Lloyd George. This time he won, with a majority of 939. He served as MP until 1923 but did contest any further Parliamentary elections.

Cotts was a Justice of the Peace for the County of London and was appointed a Knight Commander of the Order of the British Empire (KBE) in 1919 for services to recruiting. He served on the Council of Westfield College, University of London Homes for Little Boys. He was created a baronet on 15 June 1921.

== Death and heir ==
Cotts died suddenly at the age of 60 while travelling to Wales for medical treatment. He was succeeded in the Cotts baronetcy by his son William. Sir William Campbell Mitchell-Cotts (1902–1964), a barrister contested the Forest of Dean constituency at the 1929 general election as a Conservative. Mitchell-Cotts was in 1928 unpaid private secretary to Tory politician Duff Cooper.

Parliament of the United Kingdom
Preceded by Donald Murray	Member of Parliament for Western Isles; 1922 – 1923	Succeeded by Alexander Livingstone
Baronetage of the United Kingdom
New title	Baronet (of Coldharbour Wood); 1921–1932	Succeeded by Campbell Cotts
