= Calum MacDonald (politician) =

British politician (born 1956)

Parliamentary Under-Secretary of State for Scotland
- In office 11 December 1997 – 29 July 1999
- Prime Minister: Tony Blair
- Preceded by: Malcolm Chisholm
- Succeeded by: Office abolished

Member of Parliament for Western Isles
- In office 11 June 1987 – 11 April 2005
- Preceded by: Donald Stewart
- Succeeded by: Angus MacNeil

Personal details
- Born: Calum Alistair MacDonald; 7 May 1956 (age 70) Stornoway, Scotland
- Party: Labour
- Education: University of Edinburgh, University of California, Los Angeles

Calum Alistair MacDonald (Scottish Gaelic: Calum Alasdair Dòmhnallach; born 7 May 1956) is a Scottish former politician who served as Member of Parliament (MP) for Western Isles from 1987 to 2005. A member of the Labour Party, he was a Parliamentary Under-Secretary of State for Scotland from 1997 to 1999.

== Early life ==
MacDonald was born on 7 May 1956 and grew up on the Isle of Lewis, Scotland. Educated at the Bayble School in Point, Outer Hebrides and Nicolson Institute, Stornoway, he went on to graduate from the University of Edinburgh with MA Honours in History and Politics.

During the 1980s, MacDonald was a Teaching Fellow at the University of California, Los Angeles (UCLA) for three years where he also gained his PhD in Political Philosophy. He returned to the UK to help out with the family kitchen and bathroom fittings business.

His political interests are wide-ranging. MacDonald's published journalism (The Independent, The Daily Telegraph, the Glasgow Herald and the New Statesman) include articles on: Northern Ireland; the Balkans; Russia; links between Labour and the Liberal Democrats; Voting Reform; the Debate on Clause IV, etc. He was an early advocate of European defence co-operation, in "A New Model Army" (Fabian Discussion Paper, 1991) and "European Security at the Crossroads" (in B Crawford and P Schulze, Ed, European Dilemmas after Maastricht, Centre for German and European Studies UC Berkeley, 1993).

In 1990, he co-founded the Future of Europe Trust, which acted as a forum for young politicians across Eastern and Western Europe to progress their views on Europe. Between 1988 and 1992 he served on the Commons Select Committee on Agriculture. In 1991, he piloted his own Private Members Bill through the House of Commons, the Crofter Forestry Act, which has since led to the planting of mixed woodland by crofter communities in the Highlands and Islands.

Between 1991 and 1995, he was a leading campaigner for Western military intervention in the former Yugoslavia and a persistent critic of the-then Government's policy.

Between 1992 and 1997, he was Chair of Labour Initiative on Co-operation (LINC), a Labour Party pressure group promoting co-operation with the Liberal Democrats.

== Parliamentary career ==
MacDonald was first elected as MP for Western Isles at the 1987 general election.

A Europhile, he was one of only five Labour MPs to vote for the Third Reading of the Maastricht Treaty in 1993, defying his party Whip to abstain.

In May 1997, he was appointed as Parliamentary Private Secretary to the Secretary of State for Scotland.

Between December 1997 and July 1999, he was Minister for Housing, Planning and European Affairs at the Scottish Office. Between July 1998 and July 1999, he had additional responsibilities for Transport, Highlands and Islands and Gaelic. In his capacity as Minister for Gaelic, he gave the 1998 Sabhal Mòr Lecture.

MacDonald is a former Chair of the Fabian Society, the Labour Party's senior think-tank. He is an Honorary Fellow of the European Economics and Financial Centre.

MacDonald was defeated by Angus MacNeil of the Scottish National Party at the 2005 general election.

== After Parliament ==
On 1 April 2006 he was appointed as a non-executive Commissioner for Scotland for the Forestry Commission for a three-year term.

Parliament of the United Kingdom
| Preceded by Donald Stewart | Member of Parliament for Western Isles; 1987–2005 | Succeeded by Angus MacNeil (constituency renamed as Na h-Eileanan an Iar) |
Party political offices
| Preceded by Tony Wright | Chair of the Fabian Society; 1999 – 2000 | Succeeded by Gordon Marsden |
