= Malcolm Macmillan =

Scottish politician

Malcolm Kenneth Macmillan (21 August 1913 – 17 November 1978) was a Scottish Labour Party politician and journalist.

At the 1935 general election, at the age of 22, he was elected as the Member of Parliament for the Western Isles. He joined the British Army in 1939 to fight against Hitler's forces in the Second World War; but joined in campaigning against nuclear weapons after the war ended. He was re-elected at the next seven general elections, serving as the MP for the constituency for 35 years before losing his seat at the 1970 general election to Donald Stewart of the Scottish National Party.

In 1972, Macmillan was expelled from the Labour Party after disagreement over the selection of his replacement as Labour candidate, Andrew Wilson. Macmillan stood as a United Labour Party candidate at the February 1974 general election, but finished in fourth place, polling only 6.8% of the vote while the SNP substantially increased their majority.

Parliament of the United Kingdom
| Preceded by Thomas Ramsay | Member of Parliament for Western Isles; 1935–1970 | Succeeded by Donald Stewart |
| Preceded by Charles Taylor | Baby of the House; 1935–1940 | Succeeded by John Profumo |
