= Donald Murray (politician) =

Donald Murray (21 October 1862 – 6 July 1923) was a Liberal Party politician in Scotland who served in the House of Commons as the member of parliament (MP) for the Western Isles from 1918 to 1922.

Murray won the newly created Western Isles seat at the 1918 general election, but was defeated at the 1922 general election by Sir William Cotts, a National Liberal who had stood against him in 1918 as a Coalition Liberal. After his defeat, Murray did not stand again.

Parliament of the United Kingdom
New constituency	Member of Parliament for the Western Isles; 1918 – 1922	Succeeded by William Cotts
