= Angus MacNeil =

Scottish politician

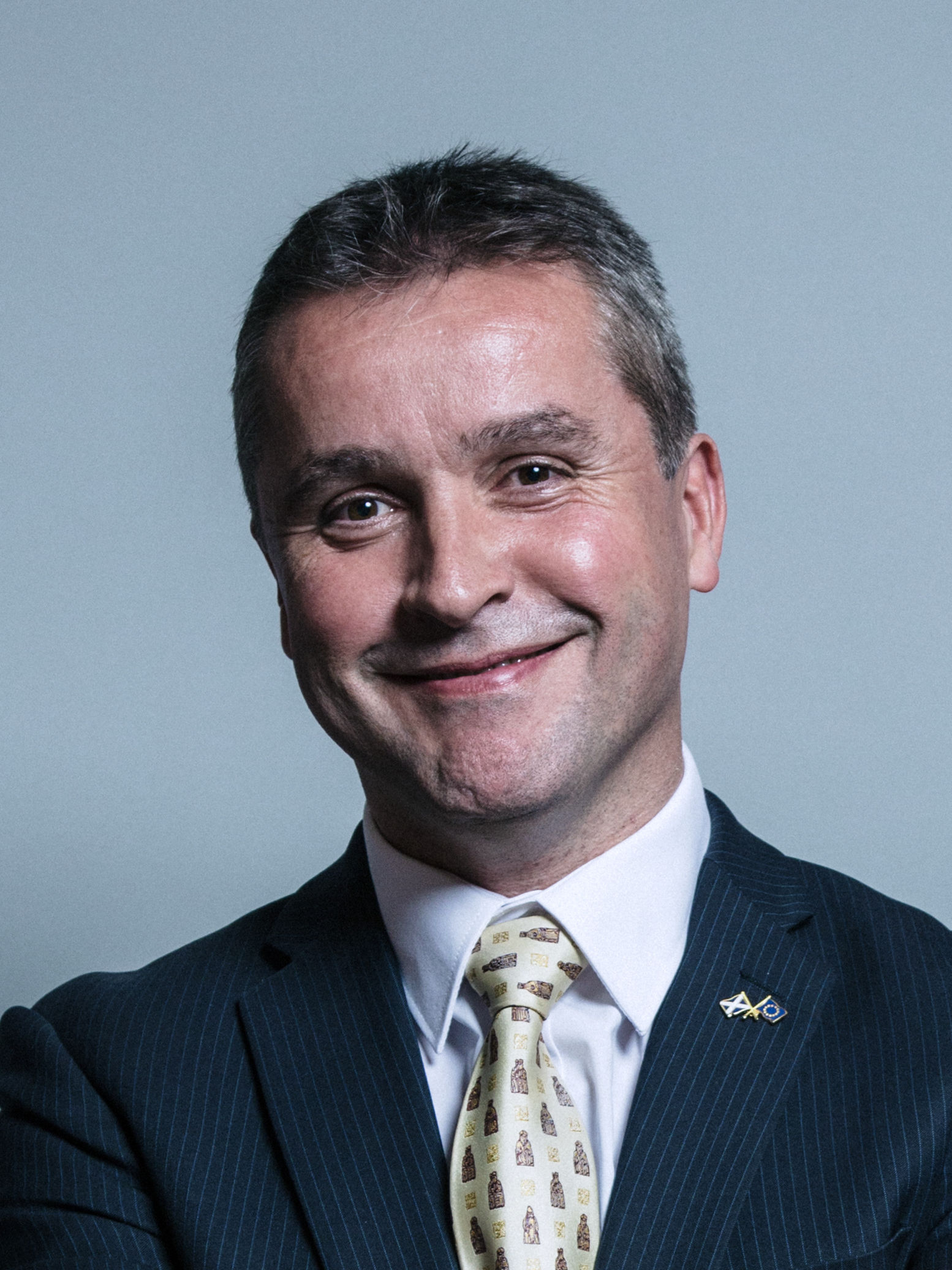
- Official portrait, 2017

Chair of the Energy Security and Net Zero Select Committee (Note: As Chair of the Energy and Climate Change Select Committee from 2015 to 2016.)
- In office 26 April 2023 – 30 May 2024
- Preceded by: Committee re-established
- Succeeded by: Bill Esterson
- In office 18 June 2015 – 13 July 2016
- Preceded by: Tim Yeo
- Succeeded by: Committee abolished

Chair of the International Trade Select Committee
- In office 13 July 2016 – 26 April 2023
- Preceded by: Committee established
- Succeeded by: Committee abolished

Member of Parliament for Na h-Eileanan an Iar
- In office 5 May 2005 – 30 May 2024
- Preceded by: Calum MacDonald
- Succeeded by: Torcuil Crichton

Personal details
- Born: Angus Brendan MacNeil; 21 July 1970 (age 56) Barra, Scotland
- Citizenship: United Kingdom; Republic of Ireland
- Party: Independent (2023–2024; 2026–present)
- Other political affiliations: Alba (2024–2026); Scotland United (from 2023); Scottish National Party (until 2023, expelled)
- Spouse: Jane MacNeil (m. 1998; sep. 2016)
- Education: University of Strathclyde
- Profession: Civil engineer, reporter, teacher
- Website: angusmacneilsnp.com

Angus Brendan MacNeil (Scottish Gaelic: Aonghas Brianan MacNèill; born 21 July 1970) is a Scottish politician who served as Member of Parliament (MP) for Na h-Eileanan an Iar from 2005 to 2024.

== Early life and education ==
Angus MacNeil was born on 21 July 1970 in Barra. He was educated at Castlebay Secondary School on the island of Barra and the Nicolson Institute in Stornoway on the Isle of Lewis before attending Strathclyde University where he played shinty and in 1992 gained a degree in civil engineering.

After graduation he worked as a civil engineer for Morrison Construction and as a reporter for the Gaelic section of BBC Radio Scotland. After qualifying as a teacher at Jordanhill College in 1996, he then taught the first Gaelic Medium Class at Salen and Acharacle Primary Schools in Argyll on the Scottish mainland.

== Parliamentary career ==
At the 2001 general election, MacNeil stood as the SNP candidate in Inverness East, Nairn and Lochaber, coming second with 25.6% of the vote behind the incumbent Labour MP David Stewart.

MacNeil was elected to Parliament at the 2005 general election as MP for Na h-Eileanan an Iar with 44.9% of the vote and a majority of 1,441.

In March 2006, MacNeil came to attention when he lodged a complaint with the Metropolitan Police regarding the Cash for Peerages scandal. In April 2006, he and former MP Martin Bell wrote to the Prime Minister Tony Blair calling for all appointments to the House of Lords to be suspended in the wake of the scandal.

In November 2006 he won the Best Scot at Westminster section of the Scottish Politician of the Year awards for instigating the inquiry into possible abuse of the honours system.

On 17 November 2006 MacNeil had the highest bill for travel in 2006–07. This is mainly due to the distance of his constituency from London as well as the dispersed geographical nature of the constituency.

At the 2010 general election, MacNeil was re-elected as MP for Na h-Eileanan an Iar with an increased vote share of 45.7% and an increased majority of 1,885. He was again re-elected at the 2015 general election with an increased vote share of 54.3% and an increased majority of 4,102.

In June 2015 he was appointed chair of the Energy and Climate Change Select Committee; in July 2016, chair of the International Trade Select Committee; in October 2017, a member of the Joint Committee on the National Security Strategy; and in April 2023, chair of the Energy Security and Net Zero Select Committee.

MacNeil was again re-elected at the snap 2017 general election, with a decreased vote share of 40.6% and a decreased majority of 1,007.

In July 2019 MacNeil criticised the then Conservative leadership candidate, Boris Johnson for stating that learning English is essential for immigrants. MacNeil called English a "Germanic import" in contrast to indigenous Celtic languages.

MacNeil was again re-elected at the 2019 general election, with an increased vote share of 45.1% and an increased majority of 2,438.

=== Suspensions from the SNP ===
On 5 July 2023, he was suspended from the SNP Westminster group for one week, following an argument with SNP Chief Whip Brendan O'Hara allegedly over MacNeil's missing key votes. A week later, on 12 July MacNeil tweeted that he would sit as an independent until deciding whether to rejoin after the SNP conference in October 2023, and that he would stand in the 2024 United Kingdom general election, though not necessarily for the SNP. As a result, he was informed that day by the SNP National Secretary his refusal to take the whip was in breach of the rules, and the following day his party membership was suspended.

=== Expulsion from the SNP ===
The SNP selection process for all MP candidates, including in seats the party holds, was scheduled to take place before the October conference MacNeil had chosen as a time he would consider re-joining the group. MacNeil said of his suspension to The Times: "It's a bit Stalinist and I'm going to fight this. They can't just resign me from the party. I've been a member since the 1990s at least". MacNeil was subsequently expelled from the SNP on 11 August 2023. He was a member of the "Scotland United" group in Parliament along with the Alba Party.

=== 2024 general election ===
In August 2023, MacNeil announced that he would stand as an independent in Na h-Eileanan an Iar at the 2024 general election. He subsequently lost to Labour's Torcuil Crichton who won with almost 50% of the votes. MacNeil finished third and the SNP's candidate Susan Thomson was second.

=== Alba Party ===
MacNeil officially joined the Alba Party in December 2024, whilst reportedly considering standing for the party at the 2026 Scottish Parliament election.

== Personal life ==
In 1998, MacNeil married Jane Douglas who worked as his parliamentary secretary.

In 2007, the Sunday Mail reported MacNeil had "kissed and fondled" two girls aged 17 and 18 in an Orkney hotel room while his wife was in hospital pregnant with their third child. MacNeil said he bitterly regretted the incident and said he was angry it had diverted attention from the "substantial political issues" he had been pursuing. In a statement, MacNeil, then 36, apologised for the "embarrassment and hurt" caused to his family by his actions.

In May 2016, MacNeil and his wife announced that they had separated; this followed reports that MacNeil and his colleague Stewart Hosie had both had affairs with Westminster-based journalist Serena Cowdy.

In October 2020, he was involved in a collision with a 17 year old motorcyclist and charged with causing serious injury, to which he pleaded not guilty. His trial was delayed until May 2022 where he was found guilty of dangerous driving and fined £1,500.

MacNeil is a dual British and Irish citizen. He is a Catholic.

== Notes ==
Parliament of the United Kingdom
Preceded by Calum MacDonald	Member of Parliament for Na h-Eileanan an Iar; 2005–2024	Succeeded by Torcuil Crichton
