= Flesherin =

Coordinates: 58.249°N 6.175°W

Flesherin: Scottish Gaelic: Na Fleisirean
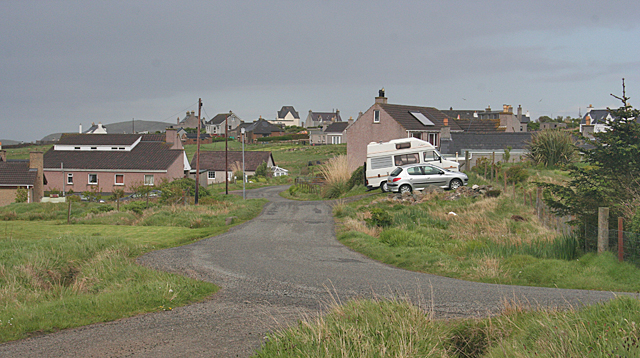
- The road through Flesherin

- Location within the Outer Hebrides
- Language: Scottish Gaelic; English
- OS grid reference: NB550364
- Civil parish: Stornoway
- Council area: Na h-Eileanan Siar
- Lieutenancy area: Western Isles
- Country: Scotland
- Sovereign state: United Kingdom
- Post town: ISLE OF LEWIS
- Postcode district: HS2
- Dialling code: 01851
- Police: Scotland
- Fire: Scottish
- Ambulance: Scottish
- UK Parliament: Na h-Eileanan an Iar
- Scottish Parliament: Na h-Eileanan an Iar

Flesherin (Scottish Gaelic: Na Fleisirean) is a small village on the Point peninsula of the Isle of Lewis in the Outer Hebrides. Located near Portnaguran, the village has a population of around 100. Flesherin is within the parish of Stornoway. Flesherin is home to the famous accordionists Tommy Darky and John 'Tonkan' Macdonald. Flesherin is also home to the mother of Stuart Braithwaite, from the Glasgow rock band Mogwai and Ronnie McKinnon the famous Scotland football player.

== Places of Interest ==
The 1915 built steam trawler Wyre Law made by Livingstone & Cooper ran aground near on the Flesherin cliffs in October 1952. Remains of the iron wreck can still be seen, although only the bow section remains visible above the sealine.

Caisteal Mhic Creacail, a Neolithic Chambered Cairn is located near the shoreline between Flesherin and Shulishader.
