= Portnaguran =

Coordinates: 58.257°N 6.163°W

Portnaguran: Scottish Gaelic: Port nan Giùran
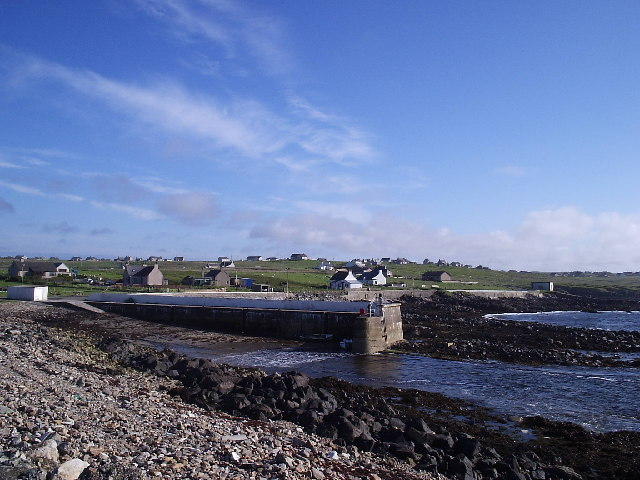
- The pier at Portnaguran

- Location within the Outer Hebrides
- Language: Scottish Gaelic; English
- OS grid reference: NB558373
- Civil parish: Stornoway
- Council area: Na h-Eileanan Siar
- Lieutenancy area: Western Isles
- Country: Scotland
- Sovereign state: United Kingdom
- Post town: ISLE OF LEWIS
- Postcode district: HS2
- Dialling code: 01851
- Police: Scotland
- Fire: Scottish
- Ambulance: Scottish
- UK Parliament: Na h-Eileanan an Iar
- Scottish Parliament: Na h-Eileanan an Iar

Portnaguran (Scottish Gaelic: Port nan Giùran) is a settlement situated within Point, on the Isle of Lewis, in the Outer Hebrides, Scotland. Portnaguran is the township at the north-easternmost point of the peninsula. It lies 1 mile (1.6 km) southwest of Tiumpan Head and just south of the headland called Geòdha 'ic Sheòrais or sometimes Small Head amongst locals. Portnaguran is situated at the north-eastern end of the A866, within the parish of Stornoway.

There is a small pier in the harbour, and the surrounding villages are Portvoller, Broker, Aird and Flesherin. The village itself is about 12 miles (20 km) from the town of Stornoway.
