= Tiumpan Head =

Cape in the Outer Hebrides, Scotland

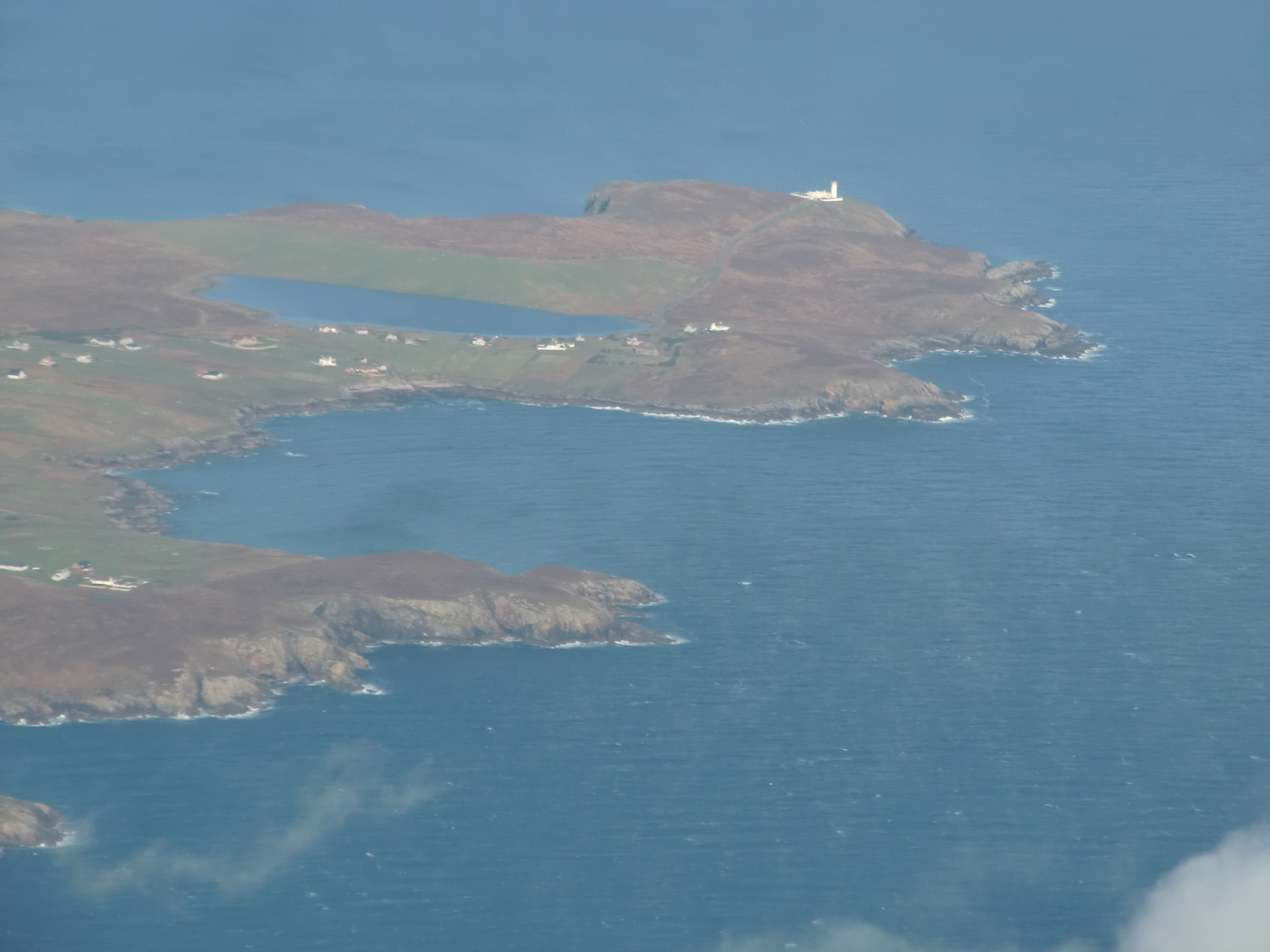
Tiumpan Head from the air

Tiumpan Head (Scottish Gaelic: Rubha an Tiompain or Rubha an Tiùmpain [ˈrˠu.ə ən ˈtʲʰũːmpaɲ], meaning 'promontory of the hill') is the northeastern end of the Point peninsula on the Isle of Lewis in the Outer Hebrides of Scotland. Tiumpan Head Lighthouse has marked the western limit of The Minch since 1900.
