= Point, Lewis =

Peninsula of the Isle of Lewis, Outer Hebrides, Scotland

Coordinates: 58°13′N 6°12′W

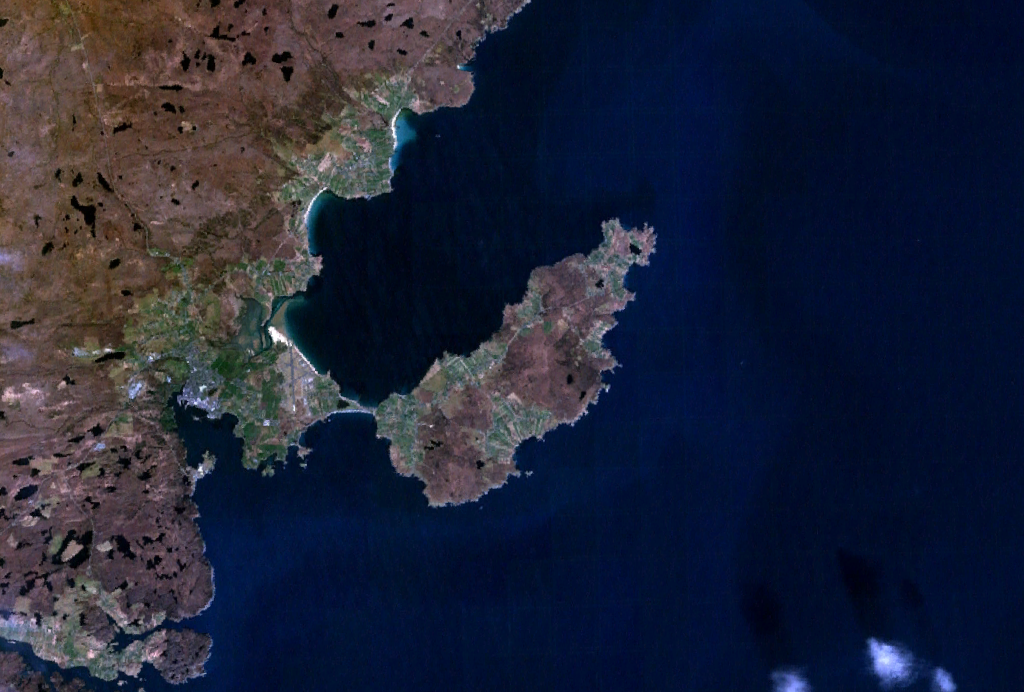
Satellite image of Point

Point (Scottish Gaelic: An Rubha), also known as the Eye Peninsula, (Note: A partial translation of Rubha na h-Aoidhe, meaning "promontory of the isthmus".) is a peninsula some 11 km long in the Outer Hebrides, Scotland. The majority of Point is connected to the rest of the Isle of Lewis by a narrow isthmus, one mile in length and at one point barely 100 metres wide. The peninsula is just 6 km east of the regional capital of Stornoway, however the district of Point actually starts at the Parkend estate on Stornoway's outskirts. Point is home to around 2,600 people and is one of the few districts of the Western Isles where the population is increasing. There are about 17 villages and hamlets in Point: (listed west to east) Melbost (Mealabost) (Including Stornoway Airport), Branahuie (Bràigh na h-Aoidhe), Aignish (Aiginis), Knock (An Cnoc), Swordale (Suardail), Garrabost, Lower Bayble (Pabail Iarach), Eagleton (Baile na h-Iolaire), Upper Bayble (Pabail Uarach), Shulishader (Sulaisiader, usually referred to as Shader), Sheshader (Seisiader), Flesherin (Fleisirin), Cnoc Amhlaigh, Portnaguran (Port nan Giuran), Aird, Broker (Brocair), and Portvoller (Port Mholair).

== Education ==
Point is served by Sgoil an Rubha (Point School), a primary school which opened in 2011 in Bayble, built on the site of Bayble primary and junior secondary school. There was a long debate about the new school, leading to a gap of over 10 years between the first plans and the building of the school. The school took a year to build, and was the first of a number of new schools built in the Western Isles. There were three primary schools in Point: Bayble, Knock and Aird. These fed into Bayble junior secondary school, which closed when the new school opened, reflecting the decline in the school-age population. There is now no junior secondary school in Point; Sgoil an Rubha feeds into the Nicolson Institute in Stornoway for secondary education.

== Heritage Sites ==
At the eastern end of the isthmus (Am Bràighe in Gaelic) are the ruins of the Eye Church, which are all that remain of a building dedicated to St Columba. This was among the largest pre-Reformation Churches in the Western Isles. Although the present buildings are probably medieval, the Church is reputedly on the site of the cell of St Catan, a contemporary of St Columba. This is the burial ground of 19 of the Chiefs of the MacLeods of Lewis. There are two old carved commemorative slabs, one depicts a warrior, believed to be Roderick, 7th Chief; while the other is Margaret, daughter of Roderick MacLeod of Lewis, who died in 1503.

In recent years, the land reform struggle of the 19th century in the Highlands and Islands of Scotland is being recognised, and the Aignish Riots of 1888 are commemorated by a memorial adjacent to the Eye Church.

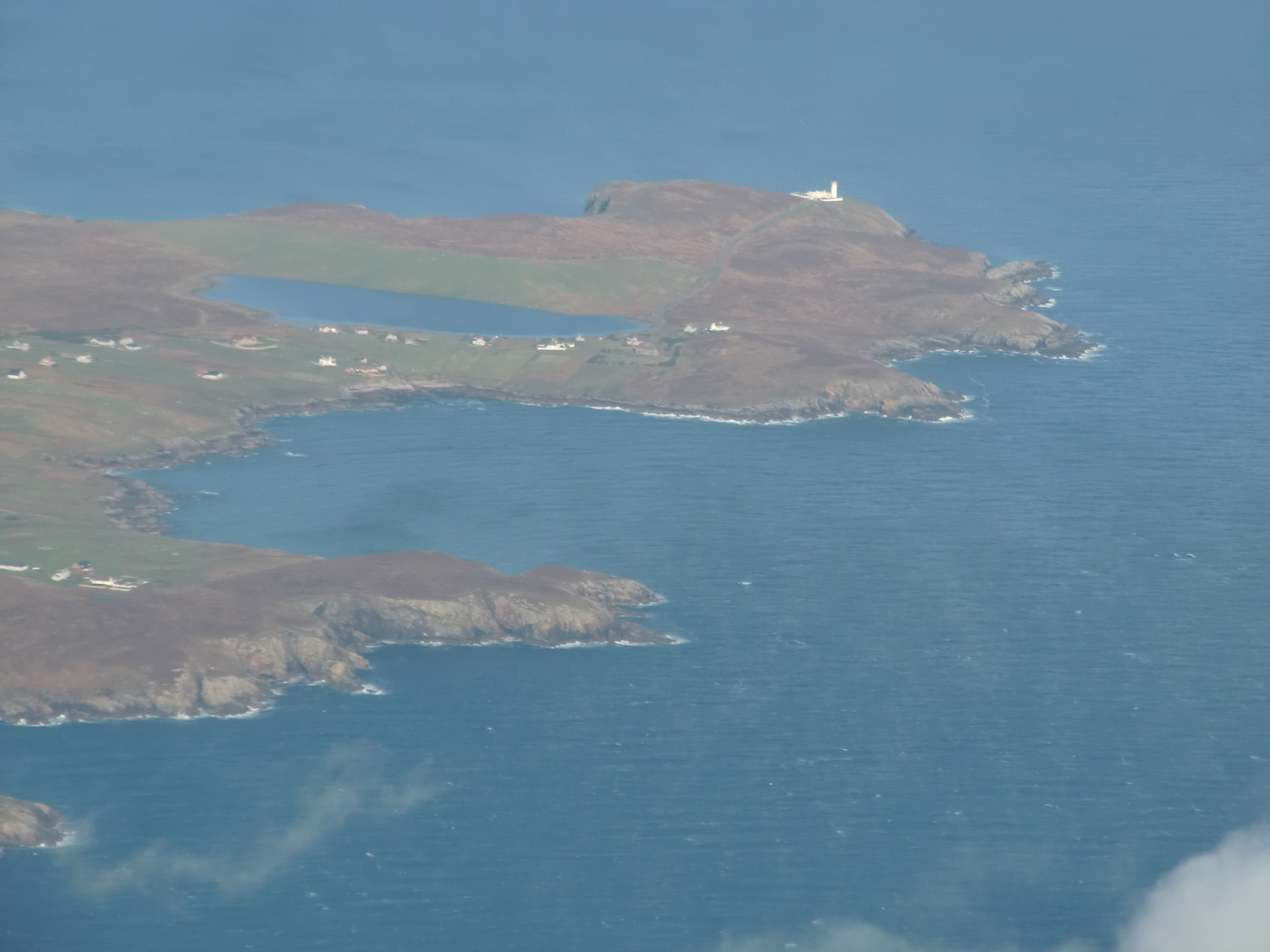
Tiumpan Head at the east end of Point and Portvoller from the air

On the north-west side of the peninsula and 30m offshore is Stac Mor Garrabost. Investigated by archaeologists in 1990s as part of the Coastal Erosion Assessment project and then again in the 2000s for The Severe Terrain Archaeological Campaign (STAC) little is known about the site except that there are the remains of structures on the sea stack.

== Notable people from Point ==
- Iain Crichton Smith: Poet and author from Bayble
- Ishbel MacAskill: Scottish Gaelic singer from Broker
- Stuart Braithwaite: Lead singer of the band Mogwai, mother is from Flesherin.
- Calum MacDonald: Retired MP for the Western Isles
- Anne MacKenzie: Journalist from Point
- Ronnie McKinnon: Rangers FC football player, Capped for Scotland 28 times, Lives in Flesherin. His connection with the island lies in Carloway, on the other side of the island, where his mother came from.
- Donald Morrison: Footballer for Dumbarton, and formerly for Point F.C. and Inverness Caledonian Thistle.
