= Na h-Eileanan an Iar (UK Parliament constituency) =

Parliamentary constituency in the United Kingdom, 1918 onwards

Coordinates: 57.671°N 6.953°W

- County constituency for the House of Commons
- Boundary of Na h-Eileanan an Iar in Scotland
- Subdivision: Na h-Eileanan Siar
- Electorate: 21,177 (March 2020)
- Major settlements: Stornoway

Current constituency
- Created: 1918 (as Western Isles)
- Member of Parliament: Torcuil Crichton (Labour)
- Created from: Ross and Cromarty; Inverness-shire

Na h-Eileanan an Iar (/nə ˈhɪlənən ən jɪər/; Scottish Gaelic pronunciation: [nəˈhelanən əˈɲiəɾ]), formerly Western Isles, is a constituency of the House of Commons of the Parliament of the United Kingdom, created in 1918. It elects one Member of Parliament (MP) by the first past the post system of election. It has been represented since 2024 by Torcuil Crichton of Scottish Labour.

The constituency was formed by merging areas which were formerly within the Ross and Cromarty constituency and the Inverness-shire constituency.

Na h-Eileanan an Iar is Scottish Gaelic for the Western Isles, which was the constituency's name prior to the 2005 general election. An identical constituency with the same name is used by the Scottish Parliament.

With around 21,000 registered voters, it has the smallest electorate of any constituency in the United Kingdom. It is expressly protected from being combined with other constituencies by the Parliamentary Voting System and Constituencies Act 2011.

== History and boundaries ==
The constituency area is that of the Outer Hebrides, known also as Na h-Eileanan Siar, and has remained unchanged since its creation under the Representation of the People Act 1918 for the general election of that year. It is currently defined as being coterminous with the area of Comhairle nan Eilean Siar, previously known as the Western Isles Islands Area before 1996. Prior to the creation of the unitary authority, the constituency was divided between the two historic counties of Ross and Cromarty and Inverness-shire and was defined as comprising:

- the burgh of Stornoway;
- the district of Lewis in Ross and Cromarty; and
- the districts of Barra, Harris, North Uist and South Uist in Inverness-shire.

== Status ==
The constituency has the smallest electorate in the United Kingdom, just over one quarter of the size of the electoral quota under the 2023 review of Westminster constituencies. It has been suggested that Na h-Eileanan an Iar could be combined with the Orkney and Shetland constituency; the resulting combined electorate would still be well below the average constituency quota.

The Scottish Boundary Commission in 1980 proposed that the seat should be extended to include the Skye and Lochalsh areas; this was overturned at a public enquiry. Generally, considerations of geographical size, a disparate population and convenience for the MPs concerned, as well as tradition and identity, have tended to override the arguments about numerical imbalance. Furthermore, a change in the Boundary Commission's rules in 2000 added a rule which forbade Orkney or Shetland being combined with another council area.

The Parliamentary Voting System and Constituencies Act 2011, as amended by the Parliamentary Constituencies Act 2020, prevented Na h-Eileanan an Iar being combined with any other constituency by designating it as a protected constituency, alongside Isle of Wight (two seats), Orkney and Shetland, and Ynys Môn.

== Electoral history ==
From its creation in 1918 until the 1935 general election, the seat was held by Liberal MPs of varying descriptions. In 1935, the seat was captured by Malcolm Macmillan of the Labour Party, who went on to retain the seat for the following 35 years. Macmillan was defeated at the 1970 general election by the Scottish National Party candidate Donald Stewart – who thus became the first SNP member of the Westminster parliament elected at a general election. Since 1970, the seat has alternated between SNP and Labour. Stewart held the seat until he stood down for the 1987 general election, when the seat was regained for Labour by Calum MacDonald.

In 2005, it became a safe seat for the Scottish National Party, with the election of Angus MacNeil. This trend was reversed in the 2017 general election, when the SNP suffered a swing against them for the first time since 1997, but at the 2019 general election the constituency became a safe seat for the SNP again. In August 2023, MacNeil was expelled from the SNP, having earlier lost the parliamentary whip. At the 2024 general election, he stood as an independent gaining 10% of the vote; losing to Torcuil Crichton of the Labour Party.

For the Conservatives, their vote had increased in recent years, since losing their deposit at the 2005 and 2010 general elections, but they lost their deposit once again at the 2024 general election.

At the 2014 Scottish independence referendum, the constituency voted against independence by a margin of 53.42% (10,544) to 46.58% (9,195) in favour on a turnout of 86.2%

The constituency is notable for having the highest percentage of Scottish Gaelic speakers of any constituency in the world.

== Members of Parliament ==
Election	Member	Party
1918	Donald Murray	Liberal
1922	Sir William Cotts	National Liberal
1923	Alexander Livingstone	Liberal
1929	Thomas Ramsay	Liberal
1931	Thomas Ramsay	National Liberal
1935	Malcolm Macmillan	Labour
1970	Donald Stewart	SNP
1987	Calum MacDonald	Labour
2005	Angus MacNeil	SNP
2023	Angus MacNeil	Independent
2024	Torcuil Crichton	Labour

== Election results ==
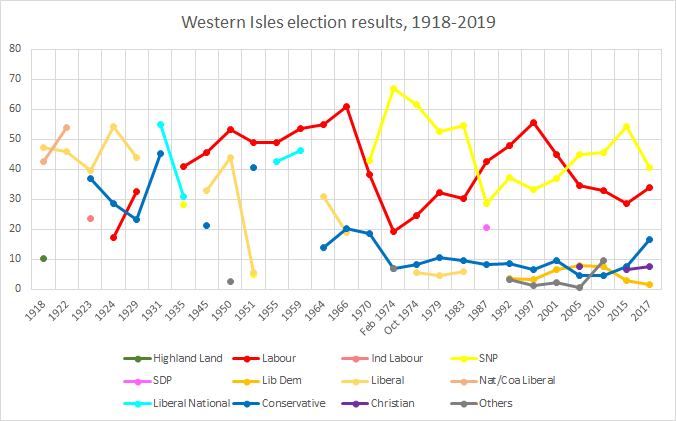
Electoral results since 1918

=== Elections in the 2020s ===
General election 2024: Na h-Eileanan an Iar
Party	Candidate	Votes	%	±%
Labour	Torcuil Crichton	6,692	49.5	+21.2
SNP	Susan Thomson	2,856	21.1	−24.0
Independent	Angus MacNeil	1,370	10.1	N/A
Reform	Tony Ridden	697	5.2	N/A
Conservative	Kenny Barker	647	4.8	−17.4
Scottish Christian	Donald Boyd	496	3.7	N/A
Scottish Family	Steven Welsh	388	2.9	N/A
Liberal Democrats	Jamie Dobson	382	2.8	−1.6
Majority		3,836	28.4	N/A
Turnout		13,528	63.7	−4.9
Labour gain from SNP		Swing	+22.6	

=== Elections in the 2010s ===
General election 2019: Na h-Eileanan an Iar
Party	Candidate	Votes	%	±%
SNP	Angus MacNeil	6,531	45.1	+4.5
Labour	Alison McCorquodale	4,093	28.3	−5.5
Conservative	Jennifer Ross	3,216	22.2	+5.7
Liberal Democrats	Neil Mitchison	637	4.4	+2.7
Majority		2,438	16.8	+10.0
Turnout		14,447	68.6	−0.9
SNP hold		Swing	+5.0	

MacNeil was suspended from the SNP in July 2023. He had decided to sit as an independent MP after having an argument with the SNP Chief Whip.

General election 2017: Na h-Eileanan an Iar
Party	Candidate	Votes	%	±%
SNP	Angus MacNeil	6,013	40.6	−13.7
Labour	Ealasaid MacDonald	5,006	33.8	+5.2
Conservative	Daniel McCroskrie	2,441	16.5	+8.9
Scottish Christian	John Cormack	1,108	7.5	+0.9
Liberal Democrats	James Paterson	250	1.7	−1.2
Majority		1,007	6.8	−18.9
Turnout		14,818	69.7	−3.5
SNP hold		Swing	−9.5	

General election 2015: Na h-Eileanan an Iar
Party	Candidate	Votes	%	±%
SNP	Angus MacNeil	8,662	54.3	+8.6
Labour	Alasdair Morrison	4,560	28.6	−4.3
Conservative	Mark Brown	1,215	7.6	+3.2
Scottish Christian	John Cormack	1,045	6.6	N/A
Liberal Democrats	Ruaraidh Ferguson	456	2.9	−4.6
Majority		4,102	25.7	+12.9
Turnout		15,938	73.2	+7.1
SNP hold		Swing	+6.5	

General election 2010: Na h-Eileanan an Iar
Party	Candidate	Votes	%	±%
SNP	Angus MacNeil	6,723	45.7	+0.8
Labour	Donald MacSween	4,838	32.9	−1.6
Independent	Murdo Murray	1,412	9.6	N/A
Liberal Democrats	Jean Davis	1,097	7.5	−0.4
Conservative	Sheena Norquay	647	4.4	0.0
Majority		1,885	12.8	+2.4
Turnout		14,717	66.1	+2.0
SNP hold		Swing	+1.2	

=== Elections in the 2000s ===
General election 2005: Na h-Eileanan an Iar
Party	Candidate	Votes	%	±%
SNP	Angus MacNeil	6,213	44.9	+8.0
Labour	Calum MacDonald	4,772	34.5	−10.5
Liberal Democrats	Jean Davis	1,096	7.9	+1.4
Christian Vote	George Hargreaves	1,048	7.6	N/A
Conservative	Andy Maciver	610	4.4	−5.1
Scottish Socialist	Joanne Telfer	97	0.7	−1.5
Majority		1,441	10.4	N/A
Turnout		13,836	64.1	+3.5
SNP gain from Labour		Swing	+9.3	

General election 2001: Western Isles
Party	Candidate	Votes	%	±%
Labour	Calum MacDonald	5,924	45.0	−10.6
SNP	Alasdair Nicholson	4,850	36.9	+3.5
Conservative	Douglas Taylor	1,250	9.5	+2.9
Liberal Democrats	John Horne	849	6.5	+3.4
Scottish Socialist	Joanne Telfer	286	2.2	N/A
Majority		1,074	8.1	−14.1
Turnout		13,159	60.6	−9.5
Labour hold		Swing	−7.1	

=== Elections in the 1990s ===
General election 1997: Western Isles
Party	Candidate	Votes	%	±%
Labour	Calum MacDonald	8,955	55.6	+7.8
SNP	Anne Lorne Gillies	5,379	33.4	−3.8
Conservative	Jamie McGrigor	1,071	6.6	−1.9
Liberal Democrats	Neil Mitchison	495	3.1	−0.3
Referendum	Ralph Lionel	206	1.3	N/A
Majority		3,576	22.2	+11.6
Turnout		16,106	70.1	−0.3
Labour hold		Swing	+5.8	

General election 1992: Western Isles
Party	Candidate	Votes	%	±%
Labour	Calum MacDonald	7,664	47.8	+5.1
SNP	Frances M. MacFarlane	5,961	37.2	+8.7
Conservative	Robert J. Heany	1,362	8.5	+0.4
Liberal Democrats	Neil Mitchison	552	3.4	−16.7
Independent	Andrew R. Price	491	3.1	N/A
Majority		1,703	10.6	−3.6
Turnout		16,030	70.4	+0.2
Labour hold		Swing	−1.8	

=== Elections in the 1980s ===
General election 1987: Western Isles
Party	Candidate	Votes	%	±%
Labour	Calum MacDonald	7,041	42.7	+12.6
SNP	Ian Smith	4,701	28.5	−26.0
SDP	Kenneth MacIver	3,419	20.7	+14.9
Conservative	Murdo Morrison	1,336	8.1	−1.5
Majority		2,340	14.2	N/A
Turnout		16,497	70.2	+3.7
Labour gain from SNP		Swing	+19.3	

General election 1983: Western Isles
Party	Candidate	Votes	%	±%
SNP	Donald Stewart	8,272	54.5	+2.0
Labour	Brian Wilson	4,560	30.1	−2.2
Conservative	Murdo Morrison	1,460	9.6	−1.0
Liberal	Neil M. MacLeod	876	5.8	+1.2
Majority		3,712	24.4	+4.2
Turnout		15,168	66.5	−1.0
SNP hold		Swing	+2.1	

=== Elections in the 1970s ===
General election 1979: Western Isles
Party	Candidate	Votes	%	±%
SNP	Donald Stewart	7,941	52.5	−9.0
Labour	Alexander Matheson	4,878	32.3	+7.6
Conservative	Murdo Morrison	1,600	10.6	+2.3
Liberal	Neil Munro MacLeod	700	4.6	−0.9
Majority		3,063	20.2	−16.6
Turnout		15,119	67.5	+4.1
SNP hold		Swing	−8.3	

General election October 1974: Western Isles
Party	Candidate	Votes	%	±%
SNP	Donald Stewart	8,758	61.5	−5.6
Labour	Mary Doig	3,526	24.7	+5.5
Conservative	Norman K. Wilson	1,180	8.3	+1.4
Liberal	Neil Macmillan	789	5.5	N/A
Majority		5,232	36.8	−11.1
Turnout		14,253	63.4	−2.9
SNP hold		Swing	−5.6	

General election February 1974: Western Isles
Party	Candidate	Votes	%	±%
SNP	Donald Stewart	10,079	67.1	+24.0
Labour	Andrew W. Wilson	2,879	19.2	−19.2
Conservative	John Mackay	1,042	6.9	−11.6
United Labour Party	Malcolm Macmillan	1,031	6.9	N/A
Majority		7,200	47.9	+43.2
Turnout		15,031	66.3	−1.4
SNP hold		Swing	+21.6	

General election 1970: Western Isles
Party	Candidate	Votes	%	±%
SNP	Donald Stewart	6,568	43.1	N/A
Labour	Malcolm Macmillan	5,842	38.4	−22.6
Conservative	Roderick Murray MacLeod	2,812	18.5	−1.7
Majority		726	4.7	N/A
Turnout		15,222	64.7	+3.2
SNP gain from Labour		Swing	+32.9	

=== Elections in the 1960s ===
General election 1966: Western Isles
Party	Candidate	Votes	%	±%
Labour	Malcolm Macmillan	8,565	61.0	+5.9
Conservative	Charles Alexander Cameron	2,832	20.2	+6.2
Liberal	John Francis Matheson Macleod	2,638	18.8	−12.1
Majority		5,733	40.8	+16.6
Turnout		14,035	61.5	−5.4
Labour hold		Swing		

General election 1964: Western Isles
Party	Candidate	Votes	%	±%
Labour	Malcolm Macmillan	8,740	55.1	+1.5
Liberal	Donny MacLeod	4,894	30.9	N/A
Unionist	Charles Alexander Cameron	2,217	14.0	−32.4
Majority		3,846	24.2	+17.0
Turnout		15,851	66.9	+2.7
Labour hold		Swing		

=== Elections in the 1950s ===
General election 1959: Western Isles
Party	Candidate	Votes	%	±%
Labour	Malcolm Macmillan	8,663	53.6	−3.7
National Liberal	Donny MacLeod	7,496	46.4	+3.7
Majority		1,167	7.2	+1.1
Turnout		16,159	64.2	+4.7
Labour hold		Swing		

General election 1955: Western Isles
Party	Candidate	Votes	%	±%
Labour	Malcolm Macmillan	8,487	57.3	+8.5
National Liberal	John C Frame	6,315	42.7	+2.0
Majority		2,172	6.1	−2.0
Turnout		14,802	59.5	−1.0
Labour hold		Swing		

General election 1951: Western Isles
Party	Candidate	Votes	%	±%
Labour	Malcolm Macmillan	8,039	48.8	−4.4
National Liberal	John Mitchell	6,709	40.7	N/A
Liberal	David Murray	916	5.6	−38.5
SNP	Calum Maclean	820	5.0	N/A
Majority		1,330	8.1	−1.0
Turnout		15,664	60.5	+4.8
Labour hold		Swing		

General election 1950: Western Isles
Party	Candidate	Votes	%	±%
Labour	Malcolm Macmillan	8,387	53.2	+7.5
Liberal	Huntley McDonald Sinclair	6,950	44.1	+11.1
Scottish Home Rule	David Murray	425	2.7	N/A
Majority		1,437	9.1	−3.6
Turnout		15,762	55.7	+2.4
Labour hold		Swing		

=== Elections in the 1940s ===
General election 1945: Western Isles
Party	Candidate	Votes	%	±%
Labour	Malcolm Macmillan	5,914	45.7	+4.7
Liberal	Huntly McDonald Sinclair	4,277	33.0	N/A
Unionist	Iain Macleod	2,756	21.3	N/A
Majority		1,637	12.7	+2.6
Turnout		12,947	53.3	+6.5
Labour hold		Swing		

=== Elections in the 1930s ===
General election 1935: Western Isles
Party	Candidate	Votes	%	±%
Labour	Malcolm Macmillan	5,421	41.0	N/A
National Liberal	Thomas Ramsay	4,076	30.9	−23.9
SNP	Alexander MacEwen	3,704	28.1	N/A
Majority		1,345	10.1	N/A
Turnout		12,947	46.8	+10.0
Labour gain from National Liberal		Swing		

General election 1931: Western Isles
Party	Candidate	Votes	%	±%
National Liberal	Thomas Ramsay	5,793	54.8	+10.7
Unionist	Iain Moffat-Pender	4,785	45.2	+21.8
Majority		1,008	9.6	−12.0
Turnout		10,578	36.8	−3.7
National Liberal hold		Swing		

=== Elections in the 1920s ===
General election 1929: Western Isles
Party	Candidate	Votes	%	±%
Liberal	Thomas Ramsay	4,877	44.1	−10.1
Labour	John M MacDiarmid	3,589	32.5	+15.3
Unionist	Iain Moffat-Pender	2,593	23.4	−5.2
Majority		1,288	21.6	−4.0
Turnout		11,059	40.5	+1.4
Liberal hold		Swing	−12.7	

General election 1924: Western Isles
Party	Candidate	Votes	%	±%
Liberal	Alexander Livingstone	4,579	54.2	+14.6
Unionist	William Morrison	2,318	28.6	−8.3
Labour	A. G. Burns	1,454	17.2	N/A
Majority		2,161	25.6	+22.9
Turnout		8,451	39.1	−1.0
Liberal hold		Swing	+11.5	

General election 1923: Western Isles
Party	Candidate	Votes	%	±%
Liberal	Alexander Livingstone	3,391	39.6	−6.3
Unionist	William Morrison	3,158	36.9	N/A
Independent Labour	Hugh McCowan	2,011	23.5	N/A
Majority		233	2.7	−5.5
Turnout		6,549	40.1	−14.0
Liberal gain from National Liberal		Swing		

General election 1922: Western Isles
Party	Candidate	Votes	%	±%
National Liberal	William Cotts	6,177	54.1	+11.6
Liberal	Donald Murray	5,238	45.9	−1.4
Majority		939	8.2	N/A
Turnout		11,415	54.1	+10.5
National Liberal gain from Liberal		Swing	+6.5	

=== Elections in the 1910s ===
General election 1918: Western Isles
Party	Candidate	Votes	%	±%
Liberal	Donald Murray	3,765	47.3	
National Liberal	William Cotts	3,375	42.5	
Highland Land League	Hugh MacGowan	809	10.2	
Majority		390	4.8	
Turnout		7,949	43.6	
Liberal win (new seat)				

Parliament of the United Kingdom
First	Constituency represented by the Leader of the Scottish National Party in Westminster; 1974-1987	Succeeded by Moray
