= Warden =

Custodian, defender, or guardian

A warden is a custodian, defender, or guardian. Warden is often used in the sense of a watchman or guardian, as in a prison warden. It can also refer to a chief or head official, as in the Warden of the Mint.

Warden is etymologically identical to guardian, both terms deriving from the Old French garder which in turn is of Germanic origin, wartēn meaning to watch or protect. It is also related to the native Anglo Saxon derived word ward

Types of wardens include:

- Prison warden, the chief administrative official of a prison
- Warden (college), head of some university colleges in the United Kingdom and Australia
- Warden of the Mint, historical highest-ranking officer of the Royal Mint
- Warden, rank of seniority within a City of London livery company
- Churchwarden, a lay officer in an Anglican or Episcopal church
- Fire warden, a person designated to aid firefighters
- Game warden, an officer who enforces hunting and trapping laws
- Mining warden, presiding officer in a warden's court
- ARP Warden, responsible for enforcing Air Raid Precautions during World War II
- Warden, the chief royal official of a royal forest
- Street warden, an officer aiding police
- Warden, an officer in a Knights of Columbus council
- Warden, a rank of Masonic lodge officer
- County warden, the head of county governments in Ontario and Nova Scotia, Canada
- Resident assistant, referred to as a warden at some institutions
- Park ranger, also called a park warden or forest ranger, a person entrusted with protecting and preserving parklands
- Parking enforcement officer, also called a traffic warden or parking inspector, an officer who issues tickets for parking violations
- Sheltered housing officers, formerly referred to as "wardens"
- Wardens of the Coast
  - Lord Warden of the Cinque Ports, a ceremonial office of the Confederation of Cinque Ports
  - Lord Warden of the Marches, a historical office in Scotland and England
- Lord Warden of the Stannaries, a historical office in Cornwall
- Warden of the Swans, an office in the Royal Household, created in 1993

== In popular culture ==
The name has also been adopted for fictional characters, among them Warden, a playable hero in the Valve multiplayer online battle arena game Deadlock. In 2022, a mob named the Warden was added to popular video game Minecraft.

== See also ==
- Block warden (disambiguation)
- Lord Warden (disambiguation)
