= List of peerages held by prime ministers of the United Kingdom =

This article lists all peerages held by prime ministers of the United Kingdom, whether created or inherited before or after their premiership. Extant titles are in bold.

== Peerages created for prime ministers by reign ==
Created after their respective Premierships

Peerage	Title(s)	Created	Prime Minister	Current status	Notes
=== King George I, 1714–1727 ===
(Kingdom of Great Britain)	Earl of Clare; Viscount Haughton	19 October 1714	Thomas Pelham-Holles 2nd Baron Pelham	Extinct 17 November 1768	Created before Premiership; Created with a special remainder
(Kingdom of Great Britain)	Duke of Newcastle-upon-Tyne; Marquess of Clare	11 August 1715	Thomas Pelham-Holles, 1st Earl of Clare	Extinct 17 November 1768	Created before Premiership; Created with a special remainder
=== King George II, 1727–1760 ===
(Kingdom of Great Britain)	Baron Wilmington	8 January 1728	Sir Spencer Compton	Extinct 2 July 1743	Created before Premiership
(Kingdom of Great Britain)	Earl of Wilmington; Viscount Pevensey	14 May 1730	Spencer Compton, 1st Baron Wilmington	Extinct 2 July 1743	Created before Premiership
(Kingdom of Great Britain)	Earl of Orford; Viscount Walpole; Baron Walpole of Houghton	6 February 1742	Sir Robert Walpole	Extinct 2 March 1797	Created during Premiership
(Kingdom of Great Britain)	Duke of Newcastle-under-Lyne	17 November 1756	Thomas Pelham-Holles, 1st Duke of Newcastle-upon-Tyne	Extinct 25 December 1988	Created with a special remainder
=== King George III, 1760–1820 ===
(Kingdom of Great Britain)	Baron Pelham of Stanmer	4 May 1762	Thomas Pelham-Holles, 1st Duke of Newcastle	Extant	Created during Premiership; Created with a special remainder
(Kingdom of Great Britain)	Earl of Chatham; Viscount Pitt	4 August 1766	William Pitt the Elder	Extinct 24 September 1835	Created during Premiership
(Kingdom of Great Britain)	**Marquess of Lansdowne**; **Earl of Wycombe**; **Viscount Calne and Calston**	6 December 1784	William Petty, 2nd Earl of Shelburne	Extant	
(Kingdom of Great Britain)	Baron Grenville	25 November 1790	William Grenville	Extinct 12 January 1834	Created before Premiership
(United Kingdom)	**Viscount Sidmouth**	12 January 1805	Henry Addington	Extant	
(United Kingdom)	**Viscount Wellington**; **Baron Douro**	4 September 1809	Sir Arthur Wellesley	Extant	Created before Premiership
On 5 February 1811, George Prince of Wales became the Prince Regent
(United Kingdom)	**Earl of Wellington**	28 February 1812	Arthur Wellesley, 1st Viscount Wellington	Extant	Created before Premiership
(United Kingdom)	**Marquess of Wellington**	3 October 1812	Arthur Wellesley, 1st Earl of Wellington	Extant	Created before Premiership
(United Kingdom)	**Duke of Wellington**; **Marquess Douro**	11 May 1814	Arthur Wellesley, 1st Marquess of Wellington	Extant	Created before Premiership
(United Kingdom)	**Viscount Gordon**	16 July 1814	George Hamilton-Gordon, 4th Earl of Aberdeen	Extant	Created before Premiership
=== King George IV, 1820–1830 ===
(United Kingdom)	Viscount Goderich	28 April 1827	F. J. Robinson	Extinct 22 September 1923	Created before Premiership
=== King William IV, 1830–1837 ===
(United Kingdom)	Earl of Ripon	13 April 1833	F. J. Robinson, 1st Viscount Goderich	Extinct 22 September 1923	
=== Queen Victoria, 1837–1901 ===
(United Kingdom)	**Earl Russell**; **Viscount Amberley**	30 July 1861	Lord John Russell	Extant	
(United Kingdom)	Earl of Beaconsfield; Viscount Hughenden	21 August 1876	Benjamin Disraeli	Extinct 19 April 1881	Created during Premiership
=== King Edward VII, 1901–1910 ===
no peerage creations for prime ministers
=== King George V, 1910–1936 ===
(United Kingdom)	**Earl of Midlothian**; **Viscount Mentmore**; **Baron Epsom**	3 July 1911	Archibald Primrose, 5th Earl of Rosebery	Extant	
(United Kingdom)	**Earl of Balfour**; **Viscount Traprain**	5 May 1922	Sir Arthur Balfour	Extant	Created with a special remainder
(United Kingdom)	**Earl of Oxford and Asquith**; **Viscount Asquith**	9 February 1925	H. H. Asquith	Extant	
=== King Edward VIII, 1936 ===
no peerage creations for prime ministers
=== King George VI, 1936–1952 ===
(United Kingdom)	**Earl Baldwin of Bewdley**; **Viscount Corvedale**	8 June 1937	Sir Stanley Baldwin	Extant	
(United Kingdom)	**Earl Lloyd-George of Dwyfor**; **Viscount Gwynedd**	12 February 1945	David Lloyd George	Extant	
=== Queen Elizabeth II, 1952–2022 ===
(United Kingdom)	**Earl Attlee**; **Viscount Prestwood**	16 December 1955	Clement Attlee	Extant	
(United Kingdom)	Earl of Avon; Viscount Eden	12 July 1961	Sir Anthony Eden	Extinct 17 August 1985	
(United Kingdom)	Baron Home of the Hirsel	19 December 1974	Sir Alec Douglas-Home	Extinct 9 October 1995	Life peerage Earl of Home before becoming prime minister
(United Kingdom)	Baron Wilson of Rievaulx	16 September 1983	Sir Harold Wilson	Extinct 24 May 1995	Life peerage Granted as part of the 1983 Dissolution Honours
(United Kingdom)	**Earl of Stockton**; **Viscount Macmillan of Ovenden**	24 April 1984	Harold Macmillan	Extant	
(United Kingdom)	Baron Callaghan of Cardiff	5 November 1987	Sir James Callaghan	Extinct 26 March 2005	Life peerage Granted as part of the 1987 Dissolution Honours
(United Kingdom)	Baroness Thatcher	26 June 1992	Margaret Thatcher	Extinct 8 April 2013	Life peerage Granted as part of the 1992 Dissolution Honours
=== King Charles III, 2022–present ===
(United Kingdom)	**Baron Cameron of Chipping Norton**	17 November 2023	David Cameron	Extant	Life peerage Granted for his tenure as Foreign Secretary
(United Kingdom)	**Baroness May of Maidenhead**	21 August 2024	Theresa May	Extant	Life peerage Granted as part of the 2024 Dissolution Honours

== Peerages inherited before, during or after premiership ==
Irish and Scottish Peers did not have an automatic seat in the House of Lords unlike their English and British counterparts, until the Peerage Act 1963 which granted all Scottish Peers (those without Imperial status) to have an automatic seat in the House of Lords until the passing of the House of Lords Act 1999, and Peers to disclaim their own peerage for the rest of their life, which Alec Douglas-Home did on the 23 October 1963.

Lord Palmerston never sat in the House of Lords as he was a holder of an Irish peerage, but sat as a member of Parliament for Tiverton during his two spells as prime minister.

Name	Courtesy title (before inheriting main title)	Writ of acceleration	Inherited title	When inherited (before premiership unless stated)	Sat in the House of Commons
Thomas Pelham(-Holles)			(Kingdom of England) 2nd Baron Pelham of Laughton	23 February 1712	No
John Stuart	Lord Mount Stuart		(Kingdom of Scotland) 3rd Earl of Bute (Note: Sat in the House of Lords as a Scottish Representative Peer.)	28 February 1723	No
Charles Watson-Wentworth	Earl of Malton		(Kingdom of Great Britain) 2nd Marquess of Rockingham	14 December 1750	No
William Cavendish	Marquess of Hartington	Baron Cavendish of Hardwick	(Kingdom of England) 4th Duke of Devonshire	5 December 1755	Yes
Augustus FitzRoy	Earl of Euston		(Kingdom of England) 3rd Duke of Grafton	6 May 1757	Yes
William Petty	Viscount FitzMaurice		(Kingdom of Ireland) 2nd Earl of Shelburne (Note: Sat in the House of Lords as Baron Wycombe in the Peerage of Great Britain.)	14 May 1761	Yes
William Cavendish-Bentinck	Marquess of Titchfield		(Kingdom of Great Britain) 3rd Duke of Portland	1 May 1762	Yes
Frederick North	Lord North		(Kingdom of Great Britain) 2nd Earl of Guilford	4 August 1790 (after premiership)	Yes
George Hamilton-Gordon	Lord Haddo		(Kingdom of Scotland) 3rd Earl of Aberdeen (Note: Sat in the House of Lords as Viscount Gordon in the Peerage of the United Kingdom.)	13 August 1801	No
Henry John Temple	Lord Temple		(Kingdom of Ireland) 3rd Viscount Palmerston	17 April 1802	Yes
Charles Grey	Viscount Howick		(United Kingdom) 2nd Earl Grey	14 November 1807	Yes
Robert Jenkinson	Baron Hawkesbury	Baron Hawkesbury	(Kingdom of Great Britain) 2nd Earl of Liverpool	17 December 1808	Yes
William Lamb			(Kingdom of Ireland) 2nd Viscount Melbourne (Note: Sat in the House of Lords as Baron Melbourne in the Peerage of the United Kingdom.)	22 July 1828	Yes
Edward Smith-Stanley	Lord Stanley	Baron Stanley of Bickerstaffe	(Kingdom of England) 14th Earl of Derby	30 June 1851	Yes
Archibald Primrose	Lord Dalmeny		(Kingdom of Scotland) 5th Earl of Rosebery (Note: Sat in the House of Lords as Baron Rosebery in the Peerage of the United Kingdom.)	4 March 1868	No
Robert Gascoyne-Cecil	Viscount Cranborne		(Kingdom of Great Britain) 3rd Marquess of Salisbury	12 April 1868	Yes
Alec Douglas-Home	Lord Dunglass		(Kingdom of Scotland) 14th Earl of Home (Note: Sat in the House of Lords as Baron Douglas of Douglas in the Peerage of the United Kingdom.)	11 July 1951 (disclaimed it in 1963)	Yes

== Prime ministers never raised to the peerage ==
Eligible for Peerage

Prime Minister	Notes	Constituency	Related peerage
Henry Pelham	Died in office	Seaford	He was in line to the Barony of Pelham of Laughton which title was extinct in 1768.
Henry Pelham	Died in office	Sussex	He was in line to the Barony of Pelham of Laughton which title was extinct in 1768.
George Grenville	Died as an MP	Buckingham	He and his male line descendants were in line to the Viscountcy of Cobham (title extant) and the Earldom Temple (title extinct). His son George became in 1784 the 1st Marquess of Buckingham and his grandson in 1822 the 1st Duke of Buckingham and Chandos (titles extinct in 1889). His other son William, also Prime Minister, became Baron Grenville
William Pitt the Younger	Died in office	Appleby	He was in line to the Earldom of Chatham which title was extinct in 1835.
William Pitt the Younger	Died in office	Cambridge University	He was in line to the Earldom of Chatham which title was extinct in 1835.
Spencer Perceval	Died in office	Northampton	He and his male line descendants were in line to the Earldom of Egmont (his great-grandson became the 10th Earl in 1929) which title was extinct in 2011.
George Canning	Died in office	Newtown	His widow was created Viscountess Canning in 1828, and his son Charles Canning, 2nd Viscount Canning was created Earl Canning in 1859. The titles were extinct in 1862.
George Canning	Died in office	Wendover	His widow was created Viscountess Canning in 1828, and his son Charles Canning, 2nd Viscount Canning was created Earl Canning in 1859. The titles were extinct in 1862.
George Canning	Died in office	Tralee	His widow was created Viscountess Canning in 1828, and his son Charles Canning, 2nd Viscount Canning was created Earl Canning in 1859. The titles were extinct in 1862.
George Canning	Died in office	Hastings	His widow was created Viscountess Canning in 1828, and his son Charles Canning, 2nd Viscount Canning was created Earl Canning in 1859. The titles were extinct in 1862.
George Canning	Died in office	Petersfield	His widow was created Viscountess Canning in 1828, and his son Charles Canning, 2nd Viscount Canning was created Earl Canning in 1859. The titles were extinct in 1862.
George Canning	Died in office	Liverpool	His widow was created Viscountess Canning in 1828, and his son Charles Canning, 2nd Viscount Canning was created Earl Canning in 1859. The titles were extinct in 1862.
George Canning	Died in office	Harwich	His widow was created Viscountess Canning in 1828, and his son Charles Canning, 2nd Viscount Canning was created Earl Canning in 1859. The titles were extinct in 1862.
George Canning	Died in office	Newport (Isle of Wight)	His widow was created Viscountess Canning in 1828, and his son Charles Canning, 2nd Viscount Canning was created Earl Canning in 1859. The titles were extinct in 1862.
George Canning	Died in office	Seaford	His widow was created Viscountess Canning in 1828, and his son Charles Canning, 2nd Viscount Canning was created Earl Canning in 1859. The titles were extinct in 1862.
Sir Robert Peel, Bt.	Died as an MP	Cashel	His baronetcy merged with the Earldom of Peel in 1942 (his younger son became Viscount Peel and his grandson Earl Peel).
Sir Robert Peel, Bt.	Died as an MP	Chippenham	His baronetcy merged with the Earldom of Peel in 1942 (his younger son became Viscount Peel and his grandson Earl Peel).
Sir Robert Peel, Bt.	Died as an MP	Oxford University	His baronetcy merged with the Earldom of Peel in 1942 (his younger son became Viscount Peel and his grandson Earl Peel).
Sir Robert Peel, Bt.	Died as an MP	Westbury	His baronetcy merged with the Earldom of Peel in 1942 (his younger son became Viscount Peel and his grandson Earl Peel).
Sir Robert Peel, Bt.	Died as an MP	Tamworth	His baronetcy merged with the Earldom of Peel in 1942 (his younger son became Viscount Peel and his grandson Earl Peel).
William Ewart Gladstone	Declined a peerage	Newark	He and his male line descendants are in the line of the Gladstone Baronetcy. Two of his sons became Peers (Viscount Gladstone and Baron Gladstone of Hawarden) but their titles are extinct.
William Ewart Gladstone	Declined a peerage	Oxford University	He and his male line descendants are in the line of the Gladstone Baronetcy. Two of his sons became Peers (Viscount Gladstone and Baron Gladstone of Hawarden) but their titles are extinct.
William Ewart Gladstone	Declined a peerage	South Lancashire	He and his male line descendants are in the line of the Gladstone Baronetcy. Two of his sons became Peers (Viscount Gladstone and Baron Gladstone of Hawarden) but their titles are extinct.
William Ewart Gladstone	Declined a peerage	Greenwich	He and his male line descendants are in the line of the Gladstone Baronetcy. Two of his sons became Peers (Viscount Gladstone and Baron Gladstone of Hawarden) but their titles are extinct.
William Ewart Gladstone	Declined a peerage	Midlothian	He and his male line descendants are in the line of the Gladstone Baronetcy. Two of his sons became Peers (Viscount Gladstone and Baron Gladstone of Hawarden) but their titles are extinct.
Sir Henry Campbell-Bannerman	Died as an MP	Stirling Burghs	
Bonar Law	Died as an MP	Glasgow Blackfriars and Hutchesontown	His third and last surviving son Richard Law was created Baron Coleraine in 1954, which title is extant.
Bonar Law	Died as an MP	Dulwich	His third and last surviving son Richard Law was created Baron Coleraine in 1954, which title is extant.
Bonar Law	Died as an MP	Bootle	His third and last surviving son Richard Law was created Baron Coleraine in 1954, which title is extant.
Bonar Law	Died as an MP	Glasgow Central	His third and last surviving son Richard Law was created Baron Coleraine in 1954, which title is extant.
Ramsay MacDonald	Died as an MP	Leicester	
Ramsay MacDonald	Died as an MP	Aberavon	
Ramsay MacDonald	Died as an MP	Seaham	
Ramsay MacDonald	Died as an MP	Combined Scottish Universities	
Neville Chamberlain	Died as an MP	Birmingham Ladywood	
Neville Chamberlain	Died as an MP	Birmingham Edgbaston	
Sir Winston Churchill	Declined a peerage	Oldham	He and his male line descendants are in the line of the Dukedom of Marlborough. Twice offered and declined a Dukedom. His widow was created Baroness Spencer-Churchill for life in 1965.
Sir Winston Churchill	Declined a peerage	Manchester North West	He and his male line descendants are in the line of the Dukedom of Marlborough. Twice offered and declined a Dukedom. His widow was created Baroness Spencer-Churchill for life in 1965.
Sir Winston Churchill	Declined a peerage	Dundee	He and his male line descendants are in the line of the Dukedom of Marlborough. Twice offered and declined a Dukedom. His widow was created Baroness Spencer-Churchill for life in 1965.
Sir Winston Churchill	Declined a peerage	Epping	He and his male line descendants are in the line of the Dukedom of Marlborough. Twice offered and declined a Dukedom. His widow was created Baroness Spencer-Churchill for life in 1965.
Sir Winston Churchill	Declined a peerage	Woodford	He and his male line descendants are in the line of the Dukedom of Marlborough. Twice offered and declined a Dukedom. His widow was created Baroness Spencer-Churchill for life in 1965.
Sir Edward Heath	Declined a peerage	Bexley	
Sir Edward Heath	Declined a peerage	Sidcup	
Sir Edward Heath	Declined a peerage	Old Bexley and Sidcup	
Sir John Major	Declined a peerage	Huntingdonshire	Accepted appointment as Member of the Order of the Companions of Honour (CH) in 1999 and as Knight of the Order of the Garter (KG) in 2005.
Sir John Major	Declined a peerage	Huntingdon	Accepted appointment as Member of the Order of the Companions of Honour (CH) in 1999 and as Knight of the Order of the Garter (KG) in 2005.
Sir Tony Blair	Currently living as a commoner	Sedgefield	Accepted appointment as Knight of the Order of the Garter (KG) in 2022.
Gordon Brown	Currently living as a commoner	Dunfermline East	
Gordon Brown	Currently living as a commoner	Kirkcaldy and Cowdenbeath	Accepted appointment as Member of the Order of the Companions of Honour (CH) in 2024.
Boris Johnson	Currently living as a commoner	Uxbridge and South Ruislip	
Liz Truss	Currently living as a commoner	South West Norfolk	
Rishi Sunak	Currently serving as an MP	Richmond (Yorks)	
Sir Keir Starmer	Currently living as a commoner	Holborn and St Pancras	Accepted appointment as Knight Commander of the Order of the Bath (KCB) in 2014, prior to becoming Prime Minister.
Andy Burnham	Currently serving as an MP	Makerfield	

== See also ==
- List of prime ministers of the United Kingdom
- List of peerages created for lord chancellors and lord keepers
- List of peerages created for speakers of the House of Commons
