= Governor Morrison =

Governor Morrison may refer to:

- Cameron A. Morrison (1869–1953), 55th Governor of North Carolina
- Frank B. Morrison (1905–2004), 31st Governor of Nebraska
- John Morrison, 2nd Viscount Dunrossil (1926–2000), 127th Governor of Bermuda from 1983 to 1988
- John T. Morrison (1860–1915), 6th Governor of Idaho
