= List of peerages created for speakers of the House of Commons =

This page lists all peerages created for retiring speakers of the House of Commons. Extant titles are in bold.

== Peerages created for the Speaker of the House of Commons ==
Title	Created	Speaker	Current status	Notes
=== Reign of Queen Anne, 1707–1714 ===
no peerage creations for Speakers
=== Reign of King George I, 1714–1727 ===
**Baron Onslow**	19 June 1716	Sir Richard Onslow, Bt.	Extant	Created with a special remainder
=== Reign of King George II, 1727–1760 ===
Baron Wilmington	8 January 1728	Sir Spencer Compton	Extinct 2 July 1743	
Earl of Wilmington	14 May 1730	The 1st Baron Wilmington	Extinct 2 July 1743	
=== Reign of King George III, 1760–1820 ===
**Baron Grantley**	9 April 1782	Sir Fletcher Norton	Extant	
Baron Grenville	25 November 1790	William Grenville	Extinct 12 January 1834	
Baron Redesdale	15 February 1802	Sir John Mitford	Extinct 2 May 1886	
**Viscount Sidmouth**	12 January 1805	Henry Addington	Extant	
On 5 February 1811, George Prince of Wales became the Prince Regent
Baron Colchester	3 June 1817	Charles Abbot	Extinct 26 February 1919	
=== Reign of King George IV, 1820–1830 ===
no peerage creations for Speakers
=== Reign of King William IV, 1830–1837 ===
Viscount Canterbury; Baron Bottesford	10 March 1835	Charles Manners-Sutton	Extinct 26 February 1941	
=== Reign of Queen Victoria, 1837–1901 ===
Baron Dunfermline	7 June 1839	James Abercromby	Extinct 2 July 1868	
Viscount Eversley	11 April 1857	Charles Shaw-Lefevre	Extinct 28 December 1888	
Viscount Ossington	13 February 1872	Evelyn Denison	Extinct 7 March 1873	
**Viscount Hampden**	4 March 1884	Henry Brand	Extant	Succeeded as 23rd Baron Dacre in 1890.
**Viscount Peel**	9 May 1895	Arthur Peel	Extant	2nd Viscount was created Earl Peel 10 July 1929
=== Reign of King Edward VII, 1901–1910 ===
**Viscount Selby**	6 July 1905	William Gully	Extant	
=== Reign of King George V, 1910–1936 ===
**Viscount Ullswater**	8 July 1921	James Lowther	Extant	
=== Reign of King Edward VIII, 1936 ===
no peerage creations for Speakers
=== Reign of King George VI, 1936–1952 ===
Viscount Ruffside	14 December 1951	Douglas Clifton Brown	Extinct 5 May 1958	
=== Reign of Queen Elizabeth II, 1952–2022 ===
**Viscount Dunrossil**	12 November 1959	William Morrison	Extant	
Baron Maybray-King	2 March 1971	Horace King	Extinct 3 September 1986	Life peerage
Baron Selwyn-Lloyd	8 March 1976	Selwyn Lloyd	Extinct 17 May 1978	Life peerage
Viscount Tonypandy	11 July 1983	George Thomas	Extinct 22 September 1997	
Baron Weatherill	15 July 1992	Bernard Weatherill	Extinct 6 May 2007	Life peerage
Baroness Boothroyd	15 January 2001	Betty Boothroyd	Extinct 26 February 2023	Life peerage
Baron Martin of Springburn	25 August 2009	Michael Martin	Extinct 29 April 2018	Life peerage
=== Reign of King Charles III, 2022–present ===
no peerage creations for Speakers

== Speakers never raised to the peerage ==
Eligible for Peerage

Speaker	Notes	Constituency	Related peerage
John Smith	Died as an MP	Andover as Speaker	
John Smith	Died as an MP	East Looe as MP	
Sir William Bromley	Died as an MP	Oxford University	
Sir Thomas Hanmer, Bt.	Died as a commoner	Suffolk	
Arthur Onslow	Died as a commoner	Surrey	
Sir John Cust, Bt.	Died as an MP	Grantham	
Charles Wolfran Cornwall	Died in Office	Rye	
John Henry Whitley	Turned down Peerage	Halifax	
Edward FitzRoy	Died in Office	Daventry	His widow was created Viscountess Daventry in 1943, which title is extant.
Sir Harry Hylton-Foster	Died in Office	Cities of London and Westminster	His widow was created Baroness Hylton-Foster for life in 1965.
John Bercow	Currently living as a commoner	Buckingham	

== See also ==
- List of speakers of the British House of Commons
- List of peerages held by prime ministers of the United Kingdom
- List of peerages created for lord chancellors and lord keepers
