= Lord Chancellor =

Great Officer of State in the United Kingdom

United Kingdom Lord High Chancellor of Great Britain
- Royal Arms used by His Majesty's Government

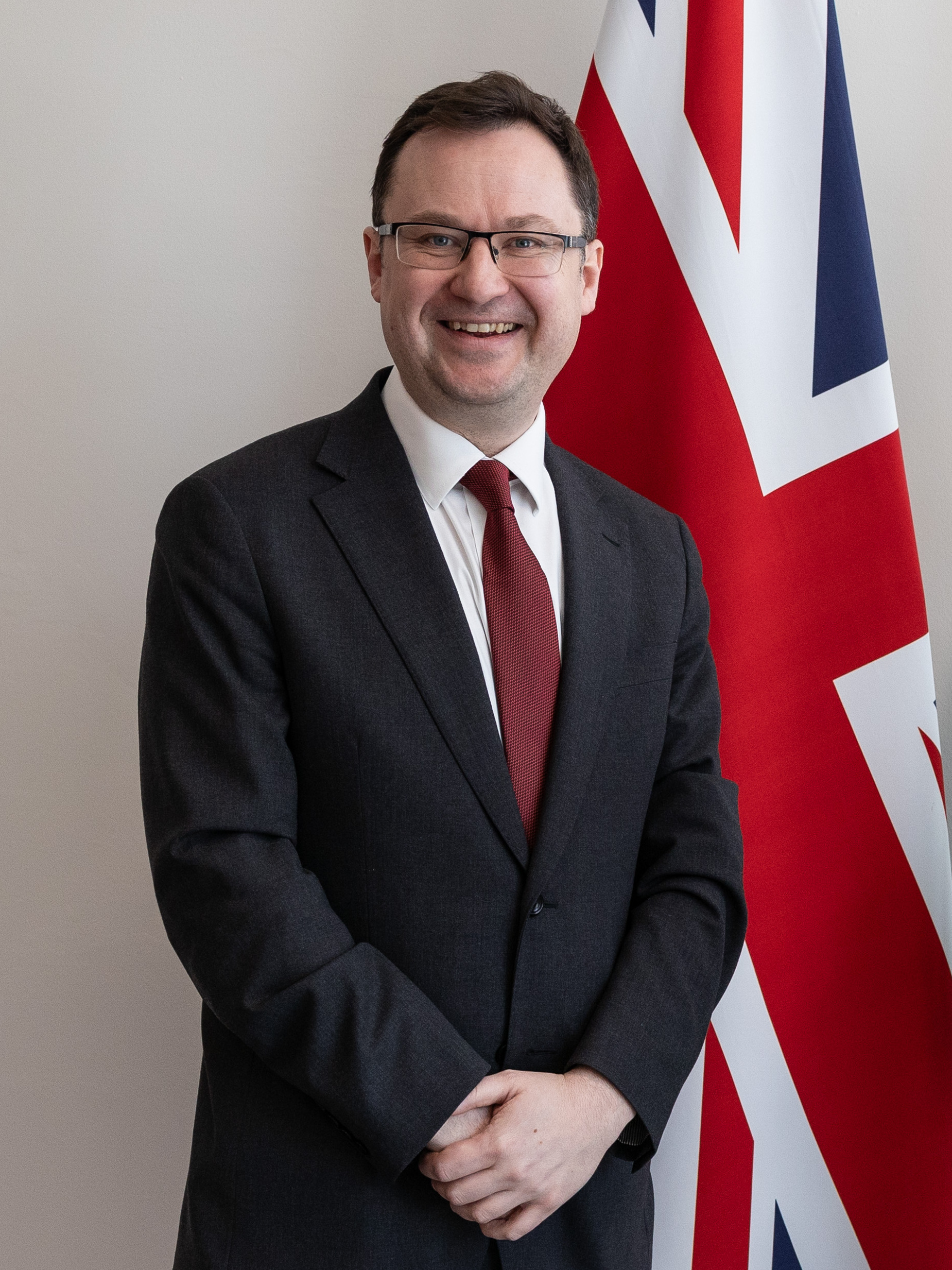
- Incumbent; Alex Norris since 20 July 2026
- Ministry of Justice
- Style: The Right Honourable (within the UK and Commonwealth)
- Type: Great Officer of State
- Member of: Cabinet; Privy Council
- Appointer: The Monarch; on the advice of the Prime Minister
- Precursor: Lord High Chancellor of England; Lord High Chancellor of Scotland
- Formation: 1707 (Great Britain); 1066 (England)
- First holder: The 1st Lord Cowper (as Lord High Chancellor of Great Britain)
- Salary: £159,038 per annum (2022) (including £86,584 MP salary)
- Website: www.gov.uk/government/organisations/ministry-of-justice

The lord chancellor, formally titled Lord High Chancellor of Great Britain, is a senior minister of the Crown within the Government of the United Kingdom. The lord chancellor is the minister of justice for England and Wales and the highest-ranking Great Officer of State in Scotland (Note: The Lord Chancellor is outranked only by the Prince and Great Steward of Scotland, another Great Officer of State, currently held by William, Prince of Wales.) and England, (Note: The Lord Chancellor would be outranked only by the Lord High Steward, another Great Officer of State, a currently dormant office only active during coronations.) formally although not substantively outranking the prime minister. The lord chancellor is appointed and dismissed by the sovereign on the advice of the prime minister. Before the union of England and Scotland into the Kingdom of Great Britain, there were separate lord chancellors (Note: The title can be pluralised 'lord chancellors' or 'lords chancellor'. The former is more common and is used for consistency throughout the article.) for the Kingdom of England (including Wales) and the Kingdom of Scotland. Likewise, the Lordship of Ireland and its successor states (the Kingdom of Ireland and United Kingdom of Great Britain and Ireland) maintained the office of lord chancellor of Ireland until the establishment of the Irish Free State in 1922, whereupon the office was abolished.

The lord chancellor is a member of the Cabinet and is, by law, the minister of the Crown responsible for the efficient functioning and independence of the courts. The lord chancellor thus leads the Ministry of Justice and is the judiciary's voice within Cabinet. In 2005, there were a number of changes to the legal system and to the office of the lord chancellor. Previously, the lord chancellor was also the presiding officer of the House of Lords, the head of the judiciary of England and Wales and the presiding judge of the Chancery Division of the High Court of Justice. The Constitutional Reform Act 2005 transferred these roles to the lord speaker, the lord chief justice and the chancellor of the High Court respectively.

One of the lord chancellor's responsibilities is to act as the custodian of the Great Seal of the Realm, kept historically in the Lord Chancellor's Purse. A lord keeper of the Great Seal may be appointed instead of a lord chancellor. The two offices entail exactly the same duties; the only distinction is in the mode of appointment. Furthermore, the office of lord chancellor may be exercised by a committee of individuals known as lords commissioners of the Great Seal, usually when there is a delay between an outgoing chancellor and their replacement. The office is then said to be in commission. Since the 19th century, however, only lord chancellors have been appointed, the other offices having fallen into disuse.

== History ==
The office of lord chancellor may trace its origins to the Carolingian monarchy, in which a chancellor acted as the keeper of the royal seal. In England, the office dates at least as far back as the Norman Conquest (1066), and possibly earlier. Some give the first chancellor of England as Angmendus, in 605. Other sources suggest that the first to appoint a chancellor was Edward the Confessor, who is said to have adopted the practice of sealing documents instead of personally signing them. One of Edward's clerks, Regenbald, was named "chancellor" in some documents from Edward's reign. The staff of the growing office became separate from the king's household under Henry III and in the 14th century located in Chancery Lane. The chancellor headed the chancery (writing office), which is a contraction of "chancellery", the office/staff of the Chancellor.

Formerly, the lord chancellor was almost always a member of the clergy, as during the Middle Ages the clergy were amongst the few literate men of the realm. The lord chancellor performed multiple functions—he was the Keeper of the Great Seal, the chief royal chaplain, and adviser in both spiritual and temporal matters. Thus, the position emerged as one of the most important ones in government. He was only outranked in government by the Justiciar (now obsolete).

Seal of William de Longchamp, chancellor in the late 12th century: the text includes ANGLI[A]E CANCELL[ARIUS], "Chancellor of England".

As one of the King's ministers, the lord chancellor attended the curia regis (royal court). If a bishop, the lord chancellor received a writ of summons; if an ecclesiastic of a lower degree or, if a layman, he attended without any summons. The curia regis would later evolve into Parliament, the lord chancellor becoming the prolocutor of its upper house, the House of Lords. As was confirmed by a statute passed during the reign of Henry VIII, a lord chancellor could preside over the House of Lords even if not a lord himself.

The lord chancellor's judicial duties also evolved through his role in the curia regis. Appeals from the law courts for justice in cases where the law would produce an unjust result (pleas for the exercise of equitable jurisdiction, in present parlance) were normally addressed to the king (in Parliament, after Magna Carta in 1215), but this very quickly bogged down because (1) Parliament was, at the time, a discontinuous affair with no fixed seat that met only for a few days a year and only when the king called it together wherever he happened to be holding court at the time and (2) the growing wealth of the kingdom ensured that an increasing number of people had the means to bring such petitions to what was, at the time, a travelling curia. To ease this backlog, in 1280, Parliament and Edward I instructed his high ministers to adjudicate such appeals themselves. Such appeals were addressed to the relevant high minister, often the Lord Chancellor. Cases that were particularly vexatious or of special importance were to be brought to the king's attention directly by the minister under whose purview they lay, but with the understanding that this would be an unusual phenomenon. Fairly quickly, the only other high minister exercising parallel jurisdiction was the Chancellor of the Exchequer (through the Exchequer of Pleas), and his jurisdiction was initially limited to matters concerning revenues and expenditures. There was no right of appeal from the Lord Chancellor; he could refer the matter to the king for judgment, but that was at the Lord Chancellor's sole discretion.

By the reign of Edward III, this judicial function developed into a separate tribunal for the Lord Chancellor as the case load continued to grow. Authority was first delegated to the Master of the Rolls, who remains the second-highest-ranking official in the English judiciary, and eventually to other members of his staff. In this body, which became known as the High Court of Chancery, the Lord Chancellor (or more often, his staff) would determine cases according to fairness (or "equity") instead of according to the strict principles of common law, though petitioners first had to show that they could not receive an appropriate remedy in the common law courts. As a result, the Lord Chancellor became known as the "keeper of the king's conscience".

Churchmen continued to dominate the chancellorship until the 16th century. In 1529, after Cardinal Thomas Wolsey, who was Lord Chancellor and Archbishop of York, was dismissed for failing to procure the annulment of Henry VIII's marriage to Catherine of Aragon, laymen tended to be more favoured for appointment to the office. Ecclesiastics made a brief return during the reign of Mary I, but thereafter, almost all lord chancellors have been laymen. Anthony Ashley Cooper, 1st Earl of Shaftesbury (1672–73) was the last lord chancellor who was not a lawyer, until the appointment of Chris Grayling in 2012. The three subsequent holders of the position, Michael Gove (2015–2016), Liz Truss (2016–2017) and David Lidington (2017–2018) are also not lawyers. However, the appointment of David Gauke in January 2018 meant that once again the lord chancellor was a lawyer.

At the Union of England and Scotland, the lord keeper of the Great Seal of England became the first lord high chancellor of Great Britain, but Lord Seafield continued as lord chancellor of Scotland until 1708; was re-appointed in 1713; and sat as an extraordinary lord of session in that capacity until his death in 1730, since which time the office of lord chancellor of Scotland has been in abeyance.

== The office ==
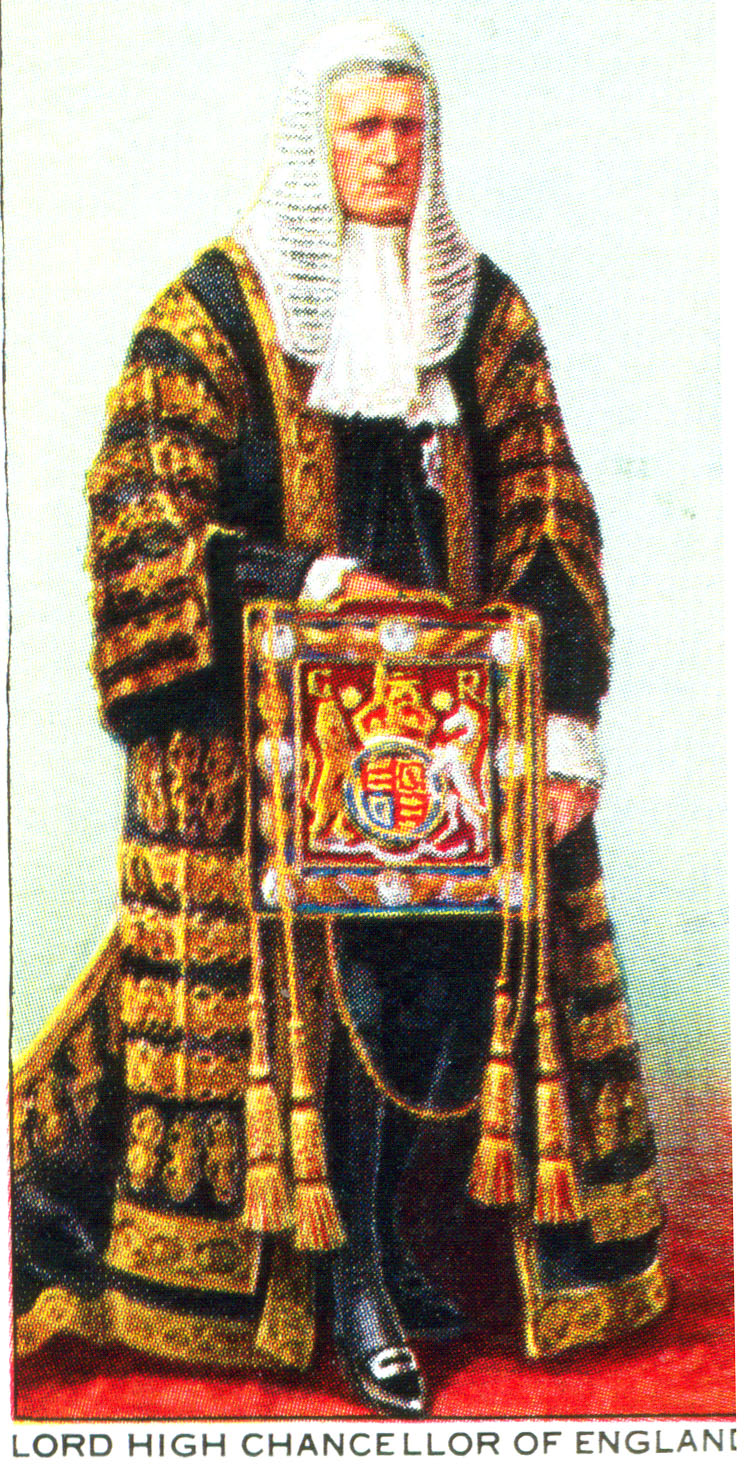
The Lord High Chancellor (Viscount Hailsham), as depicted on a cigarette card produced for the Coronation of King George VI and Queen Elizabeth in 1937. His ceremonial purse would once have contained the Great Seal of the Realm.

Formerly, when the office was held by ecclesiastics, a "Keeper of the Great Seal" acted in the lord chancellor's absence. Keepers were also appointed when the office of lord chancellor fell vacant, and discharged the duties of the office until an appropriate replacement could be found. When Elizabeth I became queen, Parliament passed an Act providing that a lord keeper of the Great Seal would be entitled to "like place, pre-eminence, jurisdiction, execution of laws, and all other customs, commodities, and advantages" as a lord chancellor. Like the lord keeper, the lord chancellor is formally appointed by receiving the Great Seal in the Privy Council, however the chancellor also takes an oath at the Royal Courts of Justice.

Formerly, it was customary to appoint commoners to the office of Lord Keeper, and peers to the office of lord chancellor. A Lord Keeper who acquired a peerage dignity would subsequently be appointed lord chancellor. The last Lord Keeper was Robert Henley, who was created a Baron in 1760 and was appointed lord chancellor in 1761. Since then, commoners as well as peers have been appointed to the post of lord chancellor; however, until the 21st-century changes to the office, a commoner would normally have been created a peer shortly after appointment.

It is also possible to put the office of lord chancellor into commission (that is to say, to entrust the office to a group of individuals rather than a single person). The individuals who exercise the office became known as Lords Commissioners of the Great Seal. Lords commissioners of the Great Seal have not been appointed since 1850.

Formerly, there were separate chancellors of England, Scotland and Ireland. When the Kingdom of England and the Kingdom of Scotland united to form the Kingdom of Great Britain under the Act of Union 1707 the offices of the chancellor of England and the lord chancellor of Scotland were combined to form a single office of lord chancellor for the new state. Similar provision was not made when Great Britain and Ireland merged into the United Kingdom under the Act of Union 1800. Thus, the separate office of lord chancellor of Ireland continued to exist until the formation of the Irish Free State in 1922. The office of lord chancellor of Ireland was abolished, and its duties transferred to the governor of Northern Ireland, and later the secretary of state for Northern Ireland. Thus, the lord chancellor remains "Lord High Chancellor of Great Britain" and not "Lord High Chancellor of the United Kingdom".

== Functions ==
=== Executive functions ===
The lord chancellor is a member of the Privy Council and of the Cabinet. The ministerial department the lord chancellor heads was known as the Lord Chancellor's Office between 1885 and 1971, and the Lord Chancellor's Department between 1971 and 2003. In 2003 the department was renamed the Department for Constitutional Affairs, and the lord chancellor was appointed Secretary of State for Constitutional Affairs. In 2007 this post was renamed Secretary of State for Justice, and the department became the Ministry of Justice.

By law, the lord chancellor is the minister of the Crown responsible for the administration of the courts and tribunals, legal aid, and matters of public guardianship and mental incapacity in England and Wales. Likewise, the lord chancellor appoints the Official Solicitor and Public Trustee, supervises the Judicial Appointment and Conduct Ombudsman, regulates legal services through the Legal Services Board and the Office for Legal Complaints, and undertakes continuous law reform with the assistance of the Law Commission. In their capacity as secretary of state for justice, the lord chancellor also administers the prison system and probation services in England and Wales. It is for the lord chancellor to recommend the appointment of judges to English, Welsh, and UK-wide courts of law and tribunals. Since 2005, senior judges – i.e. Justices of the Supreme Court of the United Kingdom, Lords Justices of Appeal and the heads of the divisions of the High Court – are appointed by the sovereign on the advice of the lord chancellor, who in turn consults an independent Judicial Appointments Commission. Since 2013, all other English and Welsh judges employed by His Majesty's Courts and Tribunals Service are also appointed by the sovereign on the advice of the lord chancellor after consultation with the Judicial Appointments Commission. The lord chancellor's discretion over these judicial appointments is limited by the Constitutional Reform Act 2005 and the Crime and Courts Act 2013. Nevertheless, when consulting the Judicial Appointments Commission, the lord chancellor may prescribe the scope for judicial nominations and choose to either accept or reject its recommendations.

As it concerns judges of local courts, the lord chancellor is required to consult the Advisory Committee on Justices of the Peace in the English and Welsh local authorities of competent jurisdiction before appointing justices of the peace, but is not otherwise circumscribed in terms of their discretion. By virtue of the Coroners and Justice Act 2009, which reaffirms local authorities' longstanding authority to appoint coroners, the lord chancellor must nevertheless approve the appointments; said approval extends to the lord chief justice's appointment of the Chief Coroner of England and Wales.

Judicial administration aside, the lord chancellor performs other executive functions. For example, the lord chancellor officiates a ceremony in Westminster Abbey at the beginning of the legal year in front of all the judges. The ceremony is followed by a reception known as the lord chancellor's breakfast which is held in Westminster Hall. Separately, the lord chancellor is involved in the appointment of senior counsel learned in the law known as "King's Counsel". Prior to 2005, the lord chancellor personally determined which barristers were to be raised to said rank. This is no longer the case. Instead, the responsibility of evaluating applicants and recommending nominees rests with an independent panel. The lord chancellor's role in this reformed selection process is now one of appointing the panel's members and assuring their recommendations comply with the principles of due process, fairness, and efficiency. The lord chancellor invariably advises the sovereign to appoint the resulting nominees so long as the appointments meet this benchmark.

Perhaps most notably, custody of the Great Seal of the Realm is entrusted to the lord chancellor, as has been the case for nearly a thousand years; this was confirmed by the Great Seal Act 1884 and reaffirmed by the Constitutional Reform Act 2005. Documents to which the Great Seal is affixed include letters patent, writs of summons, writs of election, royal warrants, royal charters and royal proclamations, among many other instruments. The actual sealing of documents is performed by order of the lord chancellor under the supervision of the permanent secretary of the Ministry of Justice, who holds the separate statutory post of Clerk of the Crown in Chancery and is thus head of the Crown Office. The lord chancellor is not keeper of the Great Seal of Scotland, the Great Seal of Northern Ireland, or the Welsh Seal. Rather, the First Minister of Scotland, the Secretary of State for Northern Ireland, and the First Minister of Wales are the lawful custodians.

=== Legislative functions ===
The lord chancellor facilitates the enactment of primary legislation, whereby bills duly passed by the House of Lords and the House of Commons (or exclusively by the House of Commons under the provisions of the Parliament Acts 1911 and 1949) receive royal assent and become acts of Parliament, that is statute law. When royal assent is requested by Parliament, the lord chancellor submits to the sovereign a list of those bills which are ready for enactment or which are likely to have passed by the time royal assent is to be signified. The list is prepared by the Clerk of the Parliaments, who transmits an advance copy to the Clerk of the Crown in Chancery for inclusion in the letters patent by which the sovereign signifies their assent. Bills for granting aids and supplies to the Crown are placed first, followed thereafter by other public bills, provisional order bills, private bills, personal bills and Church measures.

Whenever the sovereign appoints lords commissioners to perform certain actions on his or her behalf (for example, to formally declare in Parliament that royal assent has been granted, or to prorogue or dissolve Parliament), the lord chancellor usually serves as the principal or senior lord commissioner. The other lords commissioners, by convention, are members of the House of Lords who are privy counsellors (generally the leaders of the three main parties and the convenor of the crossbenches). In this role the lord chancellor wears parliamentary robes—a full-length scarlet wool gown decorated with miniver fur. The lord chancellor wears a tricorne hat, but the other lords commissioners wear bicorne hats. During the period that Jack Straw, an MP, was lord chancellor, he was officially named as one of the lords commissioners, but did not take part in the formal ceremonies of granting royal assent and proroguing Parliament. The Lord Speaker has been appointed a lord commissioner and does take part in the ceremonies. The role of principal lord commissioner during this period has been taken by the leader of the House of Lords. There is an exception: when John Bercow was presented for royal approbation for the office of speaker of the House of Commons in 2009, and again when Bercow's successor Sir Lindsay Hoyle was presented for approbation in 2019, the lord chancellor (Straw and Buckland, respectively) were the principal lord commissioner, and the lord speaker was not in the commission. This precedent has continued since then. It is unclear how these arrangements would change if a future lord chancellor were appointed from the House of Lords.

=== Ecclesiastical functions ===
The lord chancellor performs various functions relating to the established Church of England. By law, the lord chancellor must be consulted before appointments may be made to ecclesiastical courts. Indeed, judges of Consistory Courts, the Arches Court of Canterbury, the Chancery Court of York and the Court of Ecclesiastical Causes Reserved are appointed only after consultation with the lord chancellor. Additionally the lord chancellor is, ex officio, one of the thirty-three Church Commissioners, who manage the assets of the Church of England. Moreover, the lord chancellor appoints clergy in such of the ecclesiastical livings under the patronage of the Crown as are officially listed as being worth less than £20 per annum. Lord chancellors exercise the same prerogative in regard to the less valuable livings in the Duchy of Cornwall when there is no duke of Cornwall, or when the duke of Cornwall is a minor. (The heir-apparent to the Crown, if he is the sovereign's eldest son, is automatically duke of Cornwall.) Finally, the lord chancellor is in some cases the patron of an ecclesiastical living in his own right. In total, the lord chancellor appoints clergymen in over four hundred parishes and ten cathedral canonries.

Lord Chancellor (Tenure of Office and Discharge of Ecclesiastical Functions) Act 1974 (Note: Section 3.)
- Act of Parliament
- Parliament of the United Kingdom
- Long title: An Act to declare the law relating to the tenure of the office of Lord Chancellor by Roman Catholics and to make provision for the exercise of ecclesiastical functions during any tenure of the office of Lord Chancellor by Roman Catholics.
- Citation: 1974 c. 25
- Territorial extent: United Kingdom

Dates
- Royal assent: 9 July 1974
- Commencement: 9 July 1974 (Note: The Acts of Parliament (Commencement) Act 1793.)
Other legislation
Relates to	Roman Catholic Relief Act 1829

Status: Current legislation

Text of statute as originally enacted

Revised text of statute as amended

Text of the Lord Chancellor (Tenure of Office and Discharge of Ecclesiastical Functions) Act 1974 as in force today (including any amendments) within the United Kingdom, from legislation.gov.uk.

Historically, Catholics were thought to be ineligible for the office of lord chancellor, as the office entailed functions relating to the Church of England. Most legal restrictions on Catholics were lifted by the Roman Catholic Relief Act 1829, which, however, provides: "nothing herein contained shall [...] enable any Person, otherwise than as he is now by Law enabled, to hold or enjoy the Office of Lord High Chancellor, Lord Keeper or Lord Commissioner of the Great Seal". The words "as he is now by Law enabled", however, caused considerable doubt, as it was unclear if Catholics were disqualified from holding the office in the first place. For the removal of all doubt, Parliament passed the Lord Chancellor (Tenure of Office and Discharge of Ecclesiastical Functions) Act 1974 (c. 25), declaring that there was never any impediment to the appointment of a Catholic. The act nevertheless provides that, if a Catholic were to be appointed to the office, then the sovereign may temporarily transfer the lord chancellor's ecclesiastical functions to the prime minister or another minister of the Crown. No Catholic has served as Lord Chancellor since the passage of the Act, although several non-Anglican Protestants and one Muslim have done.

Since September 2026, responsibility to advise the Sovereign on Church appointments has been delegated from the Prime Minister to the Lord Chancellor. This took place as a result of the current Prime Minister Andy Burnham being ineligible as a Catholic from doing so under the Roman Catholic Relief Act 1829.

=== Other functions ===
Under the Regency Act 1937 (1 Edw. 8 & 1 Geo. 6. c. 16), the lord chancellor is one of the five persons who participate in determining the capacity of the sovereign to discharge his or her functions—the other individuals so empowered are the sovereign's spouse, the speaker of the House of Commons, the Lord Chief Justice of England and Wales and the master of the rolls. If any three or more of these individuals, based on evidence that, as required by statute, shall include evidence provided by physicians, determine and declare by an instrument in writing, lodged with the Privy Council, that the sovereign suffers from a mental or physical infirmity that prevents him or her from personally discharging the duties of head of state, the royal functions are transferred to a regent, who discharges them in the name and on behalf of the monarch.

The Lord Chancellor is responsible for making a speech and raising the toast to the Lord Mayor at the Lord Mayor's Dinner to His Majesty's Judges in July each year.

== Former functions ==
=== Head of the judiciary ===
The lord chancellor was initially considered Keeper of the King's Conscience. As such, the lord chancellor was once also the chief judge of the Court of Chancery in London, dispensing equity to soften the harshness of the common law. The growing workload of the Court of Chancery over ensuing centuries led the lord chancellor to become the recognised head of the English and Welsh judiciary. Immediately prior to the Constitutional Reform Act 2005, the lord chancellor performed several different roles as head of the English and Welsh courts. He sat as a judge in the Appellate Committee of the House of Lords (the highest domestic court in the United Kingdom), and was a member of the Judicial Committee of the Privy Council (the senior tribunal of the British Empire (except for the United Kingdom) and, latterly, parts of the Commonwealth of Nations). He was the president of the Supreme Court of England and Wales, and therefore supervised the Court of Appeal of England and Wales, the High Court of Justice of England and Wales and the Crown Court of England and Wales. He was also, ex officio, a judge in the Court of Appeal and the president of the Chancery Division. In modern times, these judicial functions were exercised very sparingly. The functions in relation to the House of Lords and the Judicial Committee of the Privy Council were usually delegated to the senior lord of appeal in ordinary. The task of presiding over the Chancery Division was delegated to the vice-chancellor, a senior judge (now known as the chancellor of the High Court). Most lord chancellors by the end of the twentieth century gave judgments only in cases reaching the House of Lords. The last lord chancellor to preside as a judge was Lord Irvine of Lairg (in office 1997–2003), who did so as a member of the Appellate Committee of the House of Lords. However, concerns were already being expressed, including by the judiciary, at the propriety of a cabinet minister sitting as a professional judge, and his successor, Lord Falconer, never performed such a role, even before his right to do so was abolished.

When peers had the right to be tried for felonies or for high treason by other peers in the House of Lords (instead of by commoners on juries), the lord high steward, instead of the lord chancellor, would preside. This also occurred in impeachment trials. The office of lord high steward has generally remained vacant since 1421. Whenever a peer was to be tried in the House of Lords, a lord high steward would be appointed pro hac vice [for this occasion]. In many cases, the lord chancellor would merely be elevated to the office of lord high steward temporarily. Trials of peers in the House of Lords were abolished in 1948, and impeachment is considered obsolete, so this is unlikely to occur again.

The judicial functions of the lord chancellor (as opposed to his role in the administration of the court system) were removed by the Constitutional Reform Act 2005.

=== Presiding officer in House of Lords ===
The lord chancellor used to be the presiding officer of the House of Lords by right of prescription. The Constitutional Reform Act 2005 removed this function, leaving the choice of a presiding officer to the House of Lords itself. Ultimately, the Lords chose to elect a Lord Speaker of the House of Lords, which title was already used in the Standing Orders.

=== Visitor of public institutions ===
The lord chancellor acted as the visitor of many universities, colleges, schools, hospitals and other charitable organisations throughout the United Kingdom. When the rules of the organisation do not designate a visitor or, when a vacancy in the office arises, the sovereign serves as visitor, but delegated the functions to the lord chancellor. Furthermore, some organisations explicitly provided that the lord chancellor was to act as visitor; these bodies included St. George's Chapel, Windsor, the Royal Institution, Newcastle University and three colleges of the University of Oxford (namely St Antony's College, Worcester College, and University College). Likewise, the statutes of Harrow School, Rugby School and Charterhouse School conferred on the lord chancellor the authority to make appointments to their governing bodies. All of the aforementioned visitorial functions were abolished, vested in the Crown or transferred to another suitable office (namely the lord chief justice) by The Lord Chancellor (Transfer of Functions and Supplementary Provisions) Order 2007 made under the Constitutional Reform Act 2005.

== Precedence and privileges ==
The lord high chancellor outranks all other great officers of state with the exception of the lord high steward, which has generally been vacant since the 15th century. Under modern conventions, the office of lord high steward is only filled on the day of a new monarch's coronation; thus, at all other times, the lord chancellor remains the highest ranking great officer. The importance of the office is reflected by the Treason Act 1351, which makes it high treason to slay the lord chancellor. A lord high treasurer would be entitled to the same protection—but the office is now held in commission—as would a judge whilst actually in court, determining a case.

The lord chancellor's position in the modern order of precedence is an extremely high one, generally being outranked only by the royal family and high ecclesiastics. In England, the lord chancellor precedes all non-royal individuals except the archbishop of Canterbury. In Scotland, they precede all non-royal individuals except the Lord High Commissioner to the General Assembly of the Church of Scotland. Although lord chancellor "of Great Britain", they maintain a position in the order of precedence in Northern Ireland; there, they outrank all non-royal individuals with the exception of the Anglican and Roman Catholic archbishops of Armagh, the Anglican and Roman Catholic archbishops of Dublin and the moderator of the Presbyterian Church in Ireland. Throughout the United Kingdom, the lord chancellor technically outranks the prime minister, although the latter generally possesses more power. The precedence of a lord keeper of the Great Seal is equivalent to that of a lord chancellor. The precedence of lords commissioners of the Great Seal is much lower (see United Kingdom order of precedence).

The lord chancellor is entitled to an annual emolument of £227,736 and was formerly entitled to an annual pension of £106,868; however, the immediate entitlement to this £106,868 pension was formally abolished for new officeholders by the Public Service Pensions Act 2013. The lord chancellor's salary is higher than that of any other public official, including even the prime minister, although sometimes the office holder may voluntarily decide to receive a reduced salary (recent holders have taken the salary of a secretary of state).

== Official dress ==
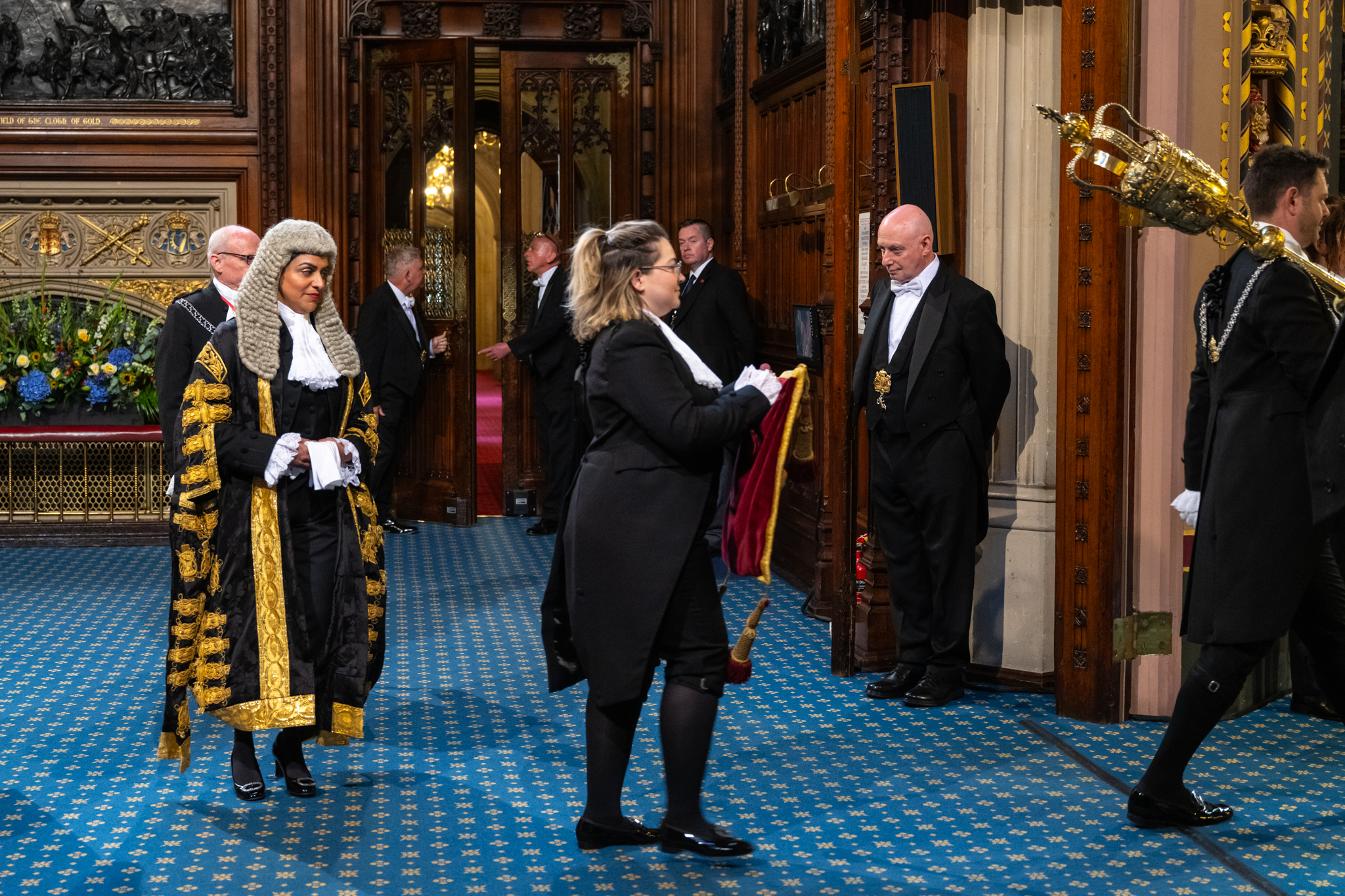
The Lord High Chancellor (Shabana Mahmood) wearing full ceremonial dress at the 2024 State Opening of Parliament, preceded by her purse-bearer and a serjeant-at-arms.

The lord chancellor, on formal state occasions such as the State Opening of Parliament, wears legal court dress consisting of a black silk velvet cutaway tailcoat with cloth covered buttons, waistcoat and breeches worn with white shirt, lace stock and cuffs, black silk stockings and cut-steel buckled patent court shoes. Over this is worn a black silk damask robe of state with a long train trimmed with gold lace and frogging, with a black silk 'wig bag' attached to the flap collar at the back. A full-bottomed wig is worn and, in the past, a black tricorne hat was carried (the hat is still worn by lord chancellors on rare occasions, such as when they appear robed as one of the Lords Commissioners).

When the lord chancellor sat in the Lords, they wore an undress version of court dress, consisting of the court dress but made of black superfine cloth rather than silk velvet, and over that a black silk robe with a train with the wig bag attached. The full-bottomed wig was also worn, and the tricorne carried.

Now that the lord chancellor is appointed from the Commons rather than the Lords, they normally wear a business suit and only wear full ceremonial dress for state occasions. There is an unofficial precedent that lord chancellors that do not have a legal background do not wear the wig. Jack Straw (a qualified barrister) initially did not wear one but did so afterwards, as did his immediate successor, Kenneth Clarke (a barrister and Queen's Counsel). Chris Grayling, Michael Gove, Liz Truss and David Lidington (none of whom had a legal background) did not do so, nor did David Gauke or Dominic Raab (who were solicitors); but Robert Buckland, Brandon Lewis, Alex Chalk, Shabana Mahmood and David Lammy (all of whom were barristers) did wear the customary wig when in full ceremonial dress.

In 2019, when serving as one of the Lords Commissioners at the Approbation of the new speaker of the Commons (Sir Lindsay Hoyle), the lord chancellor Robert Buckland wore the full court dress and robe of state, the full bottomed wig and a tricorne hat (hats are always worn in the chamber by the Lords Commissioners on these occasions).

=== Insignia ===
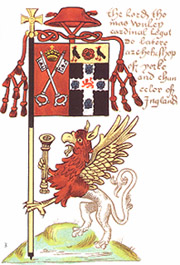
Heraldic banner of Cardinal Thomas Wolsey, who was the archbishop of York and lord chancellor, showing the arms of the See of York impaling his personal arms, with a cardinal's hat above. The griffin supporter holds the lord chancellor's mace.

The historic insignia of the lord chancellor is a purse containing the Great Seal and a mace. The Elizabethan play Sir Thomas More opens Scene II as follows: "Chelsea. A Room in More's House. A table being covered with a green carpet, a state cushion on it, and the Purse and Mace lying thereon, enter Sir Thomas More".

== Reform ==
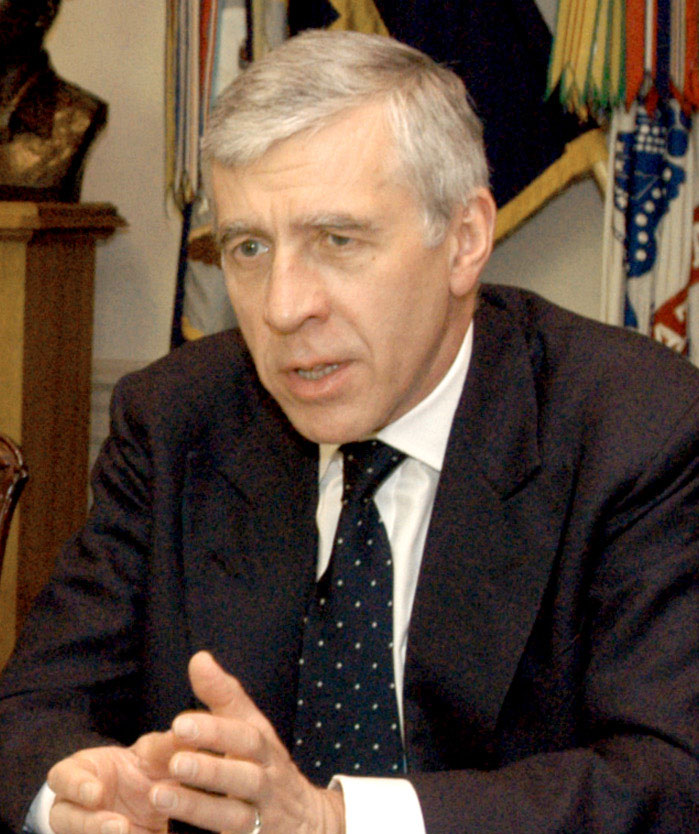
Jack Straw was the first commoner to be appointed as Lord Chancellor since 1587.

In the early 21st century, the Labour government viewed it as untenable that all three political functions (executive, legislative and judicial) should be continued in the historical office of Lord Chancellor. In the Government's view, this infringed Montesquieu's principle of separation of powers which declared that no person should have access to all of the three political functions. The lord chancellor could exercise all three powers, and some, such as Quintin, Lord Hailsham, often did so. The Labour Government also took the view that these powers were inconsistent with the European Convention on Human Rights.

However, proposals by the Blair government simply to abolish the office met with opposition from those who felt that such an official was necessary to speak on the judiciary's behalf in Cabinet, as well as from many who opposed the sudden abolition of such an ancient office. In 2003, Tony Blair chose his close friend and former flatmate Lord Falconer to be Lord Chancellor and Secretary of State for Constitutional Affairs. At the same time, he announced his intention to abolish the office of lord chancellor and to make many other constitutional reforms. After much surprise and confusion, it became clear that the ancient office of lord chancellor could not be abolished without an Act of Parliament. Thus Lord Falconer duly appeared the following day in the House of Lords to carry out his duties from the Woolsack. The Lord Chancellor's Department was, however, renamed the Department for Constitutional Affairs.

In January 2004, the Department of Constitutional Affairs published a concordat, outlining the division of authority between lord chancellor and lord chief justice and which was intended as the basis of reform. The Government introduced the Constitutional Reform Bill in the House of Lords in February 2004. The bill sought to abolish the office of lord chancellor, and to transfer its functions to other officials: legislative functions to a speaker of the House of Lords, executive functions to the secretary of state for constitutional affairs and judicial functions to the lord chief justice. The bill also made other constitutional reforms, such as transferring the judicial duties of the House of Lords to a supreme court. However, unlike the responsibilities of other secretaries of state, which can be transferred from one department to another by an order-in-council, several functions of the lord chancellor are linked to the office of lord chancellor as a matter of statute law. Those "protected functions" of the lord chancellor can only be transferred to other ministers by Act of Parliament. As a consequence, it became clear that it was extremely difficult to simply "abolish" the office of lord chancellor.

In March 2004, however, the Lords upset the Government's plans by sending the bill to a Select committee. Although initially seen as a move to kill the bill, the Government and HM Opposition agreed to permit the bill to proceed through the parliamentary process, subject to any amendments made by the committee. On 13 July 2004, the House amended the Constitutional Reform Bill such that the title of lord chancellor would be retained, although the Government's other proposed reforms were left intact. Then, in November 2004, the Government introduced an amendment in the Lords which wholly removed references to the secretary of state for constitutional affairs, changing them to ones about the lord chancellor, with the positions of secretary of state and lord chancellor envisaged as being held by the same person. The final Constitutional Reform Act received royal assent on 24 March 2005 and the major transfers of the historical functions of the lord chancellor to others (such as the Lord Chief Justice and Lord Speaker of the House of Lords) were complete by mid-2006. However the lord chancellor and secretary of state for constitutional affairs remained a member of the Prime Minister's Cabinet, retaining most of the office's original statutory functions.

In May 2007, the Department of Constitutional Affairs was abolished and its functions were transferred to a newly created Ministry of Justice which also took charge of certain responsibilities transferred from the Home Office. Lord Falconer retained the title, salary and office of lord chancellor, as well as being created the inaugural Secretary of State for Justice.

Prior to Tony Blair's premiership, were a person not a peer to be appointed to the office of lord chancellor, he would be raised to the peerage upon appointment, though provision was made in 1539 for non-peers who are great officers of state to sit in between the benches in the House. With the enactment of the Constitutional Reform Act 2005 and the subsequent separation of the roles of lord chancellor and speaker of the House of Lords, it is no longer necessary for the lord chancellor to be a peer or to have a legal background. (Note: In his memoirs, John Simon (who served as Lord Chancellor 1940–1945) writes, "It is not constitutionally necessary that the Lord Chancellor should be a Peer (Sir Thomas More was not, for one), but this is practically inevitable, for otherwise he would be limited to the formal business of presiding and "putting the Question" and be unable to take the smallest part in debate. The theory is that the Woolsack itself, and, I suppose, the space immediately in front of it, do not form part of the debating floor, and that is the reason why, when the Lord Chancellor takes part in any discussion – even when only moving the reading of a Bill – he steps nimbly to the left and thus speaks while standing on what is in the full sense Lords' territory.") In June 2007, Jack Straw MP was appointed lord chancellor and secretary of state for justice, thus becoming the first lord chancellor to be a member of the Commons, rather than the House of Lords or its predecessor, the Curia Regis, since Christopher Hatton in 1587.

Both Straw and his immediate successor, Ken Clarke, were barristers. In 2012 Chris Grayling became the first justice secretary without a legal background, in which he was followed by his three immediate successors. One of these, Liz Truss in 2016, became the first woman to serve as lord chancellor of the United Kingdom (Queen Eleanor of Provence was keeper of the great seal, and so arguably lord chancellor, of England in 1253–54). Subsequently, the post was for the first time held by solicitors, David Gauke and Dominic Raab.

== Fictional depictions ==
A fictional depiction of a lord chancellor occurs in Iolanthe, the frequently-revived comic opera by W. S. Gilbert and Arthur Sullivan. The lord chancellor is the central character in the work but is identified only by his title.

William Rehnquist, late Chief Justice of the United States, was inspired to add four golden stripes to the sleeves of his judicial robes after seeing the costume of the lord chancellor in a production of Iolanthe. The current chief justice, John Roberts, has not continued the practice.

A fictional lord chancellor also appears in Charles Dickens' novel Bleak House (also identified only by title), presiding over the interminable chancery case of Jarndyce and Jarndyce.

Anthony Trollope's Palliser novels feature a number of references to fictitious lord chancellors. The Liberal Lord Weazeling holds the office in the Liberal governments of Mildmay and Gresham in Phineas Finn and Phineas Redux; the Conservative Lord Ramsden holds the position in the Duke of Omnium's coalition government in The Prime Minister. In Gresham's final government at the end of The Prime Minister, the former Liberal Attorney General, Sir Gregory Grogram, is finally given the position, which he had desired for some time.

"King Hilary and the Beggarman", a children's poem by A. A. Milne, relates the story of a fictional lord high chancellor, "Proud Lord Willoughby", who is dismissed for refusing to obey his king.

In David Gurr's thriller A Woman Called Scylla, set in 1977, the main villain is an utterly ruthless and unscrupulous lord chancellor, who grossly abuses his many functions and powers in order to cover up his treason during the Second World War and as a stepping stone towards becoming prime minister. As the writer clearly states, this was not intended to refer to the actual holder of the office at the time of writing or at any other time.

The Lord Chancellor is portrayed by Preston Lockwood in "Rumpole and the Tap End" episode of the Rumpole of the Bailey TV series. He is shown making himself a necklace/chain of office from coloured paper clips, whilst reprimanding Judge Featherstone.

== See also ==
- Alienation Office
- Great Officers of State (United Kingdom)
- Great Offices of State
- List of lord chancellors and lord keepers
- List of lord chancellors of Scotland
- List of peerages created for lord chancellors and lord keepers
- Lord Keeper of the Privy Seal
- Lord Warden

== Bibliography ==
- Watson, Steven. "Figures on a Woolsack" History Today (Feb 1955) 5#2 pp 75–83.
  - Watson, Steven. "Figures on a Woolsack part 2" History Today (Apr 1955) 55#4 pp 228–235
- Campbell, John (1878). Lives of the Lord Chancellors and Keepers of the Great Seal of England From the Earliest Times Till the Reign of Queen Victoria. Vol. I (7th ed.). London: John Murray.
- Simon, Viscount John Allsebrook (1952). Retrospect: the memoirs of Viscount Simon. Hutchinson.
- Great Britain: Parliament: House of Lords (2005). Companion to the Standing Orders and Guide to the Proceedings of the House of Lords. The Stationery Office. ISBN 978-0-10-400709-9.
- Department for Constitutional Affairs. (2003). "Constitutional Reform: Reforming the Office of the Lord Chancellor"
- House of Lords. (2003–2004). Bill 30 (Constitutional Reform Bill).
- Chisholm, Hugh, ed. (1911). "Lord High Chancellor". Encyclopædia Britannica. Vol. 17 (11th ed.). Cambridge University Press. p. 3.
