= 1982 Western Isles Islands Council election =

← 1978	6 May 1982	1986 →

All 30 seats to Western Isles Council 16 seats needed for a majority
	First party
Leader	Donald Macauley
Party	Independent
Leader's seat	Uig
Last election	30 seats, 100.0%
Seats before	30
Seats won	30
Seat change	0
Popular vote	5,314
Percentage	100.0%
Swing	0.0%
Council control before election
Donald Macauley
Independent
Council control after election
Sandy Matheson
Independent

The third election to the Western Isles Islands Council was held on 6 May 1982 as part of the wider 1982 Scottish regional elections. All candidates stood as Independents. Of the councils 30 councillors, 19 were elected unopposed.

Five incumbent councillors were defeated in the election, including Education Committee Chair Kathleen Macaskill.

Following the election, Alexander Matheson, the final Provost of Stornoway Town Council prior to its abolition in 1975, unseated incumbent Convener Donald Macaulay in their third successive contest for the position. Macaulay was subsequently elected Matheson's Vice-Convener after a 15-15 council vote was decided by lot.

== Aggregate results ==
Western Isles Council election, 1982
Party	Seats	Gains	Losses	Net gain/loss	Seats %	Votes %	Votes	+/−
Independent	30	0	0	0	100.00	100.00	5,314	0.0

== Ward results ==
Port of Ness
Party	Candidate	Votes	%
Independent	Donald Murray	318	54.1%
Independent	Angus Morrison (Incumbent)	269	45.7%
Majority		49	8.4%
Independent hold			

Dell
Party	Candidate	Votes	%
Independent	Donald Murray	258	56.7%
Independent	Kathleen MacAskill (Incumbent)	196	43.1%
Majority		62	13.6%
Independent hold			

Barvas
Party	Candidate	Votes	%
Independent	W. MacLeod (Incumbent)	unopposed	unopposed
Majority		unopposed	unopposed
Independent hold			

Shawbost
Party	Candidate	Votes	%
Independent	Donald MacLeod	318	58.3%
Independent	Malcolm MacLeod (Incumbent)	180	33.0%
Independent	Donald Murray	47	8.6%
Majority		138	25.3%
Independent hold			

Carloway
Party	Candidate	Votes	%
Independent	Malcolm MacArthur (Incumbent)	unopposed	unopposed
Majority		unopposed	unopposed
Independent hold			

Uig
Party	Candidate	Votes	%
Independent	Donald MacAulay (Incumbent)	unopposed	unopposed
Majority		unopposed	unopposed
Independent hold			

Gress
Party	Candidate	Votes	%
Independent	K.A. MacIver (Incumbent)	unopposed	unopposed
Majority		unopposed	unopposed
Independent hold			

Coll
Party	Candidate	Votes	%
Independent	Murdo MacDonald (Incumbent)	351	60.3%
Independent	J. MacIver	231	39.7%
Majority		120	20.6%
Independent hold			

Laxdale
Party	Candidate	Votes	%
Independent	Allan MacLeod	156	39.4%
Independent	Angus MacLeod	128	32.3%
Independent	Norman MacIver	111	28.0%
Majority		28	7.1%
Independent hold			

Coulregrein
Party	Candidate	Votes	%
Independent	J.M. MacMillan (Incumbent)	unopposed	unopposed
Majority		unopposed	unopposed
Independent hold			

Manor Park
Party	Candidate	Votes	%
Independent	James MacRae (Incumbent)	unopposed	unopposed
Majority		unopposed	unopposed
Independent hold			

Bayhead
Party	Candidate	Votes	%
Independent	Murdo Afrin (Incumbent)	244	51.8%
Independent	Colin Finlayson	153	32.5%
Independent	Frank Apps	47	10.0%
Independent	Jim Galloway	26	5.5%
Majority		91	19.3%
Independent hold			

Goathill
Party	Candidate	Votes	%
Independent	M.A. MacMillan (Incumbent)	unopposed	unopposed
Majority		unopposed	unopposed
Independent hold			

Newton
Party	Candidate	Votes	%
Independent	Sandy Matheson (Incumbent)	unopposed	unopposed
Majority		unopposed	unopposed
Independent hold			

Sandwick
Party	Candidate	Votes	%
Independent	Duncan Kennedy	332	58.6%
Independent	William MacDonald (Incumbent)	234	41.3%
Majority		98	17.3%
Independent hold			

Aignish
Party	Candidate	Votes	%
Independent	John Crichton (Incumbent)	unopposed	unopposed
Majority		unopposed	unopposed
Independent hold			

Tiumpan
Party	Candidate	Votes	%
Independent	Donald MacKay (Incumbent)	unopposed	unopposed
Majority		unopposed	unopposed
Independent hold			

North Lochs
Party	Candidate	Votes	%
Independent	D.R. MacAulay	393	74.4%
Independent	J.P. MacIntosh	135	25.6%
Majority		258	48.8%
Independent hold			

Kinloch
Party	Candidate	Votes	%
Independent	Ian MacLennan (Incumbent)	unopposed	unopposed
Majority		unopposed	unopposed
Independent hold			

Pairc
Party	Candidate	Votes	%
Independent	D. MacKay (Incumbent)	unopposed	unopposed
Majority		unopposed	unopposed
Independent hold			

Tarbert
Party	Candidate	Votes	%
Independent	Donald MacKinnon (Incumbent)	unopposed	unopposed
Majority		unopposed	unopposed
Independent hold			

Bays
Party	Candidate	Votes	%
Independent	D. MacDonald (Incumbent)	unopposed	unopposed
Majority		unopposed	unopposed
Independent hold			

Obbe
Party	Candidate	Votes	%
Independent	Wilfred Leonard (Incumbent)	153	32.9%
Independent	Murdo MacLean	126	27.1%
Independent	James Downie	112	24.1%
Independent	George MacLeod	74	15.9%
Majority		27	5.8%
Independent hold			

Paible
Party	Candidate	Votes	%
Independent	Donald MacDonald	223	55.8%
Independent	N.M. Johnston	177	44.3%
Majority		46	11.6%
Independent hold			

Lochmaddy
Party	Candidate	Votes	%
Independent	James Robertson (Incumbent)	unopposed	unopposed
Majority		unopposed	unopposed
Independent hold			

Benbecula
Party	Candidate	Votes	%
Independent	J. MacArthur	181	56.2%
Independent	Catherine MacEachan	141	43.8%
Majority		40	12.5%
Independent hold			

Iochdar
Party	Candidate	Votes	%
Independent	Mary Bremner (Incumbent)	unopposed	unopposed
Majority		unopposed	unopposed
Independent hold			

Lochboisdale
Party	Candidate	Votes	%
Independent	J. MacIntyre (Incumbent)	unopposed	unopposed
Majority		unopposed	unopposed
Independent hold			

Northbay
Party	Candidate	Votes	%
Independent	Reginald Allan (Incumbent)	unopposed	unopposed
Majority		unopposed	unopposed
Independent hold			

Castlebay
Party	Candidate	Votes	%
Independent	Hugh Morrison (Incumbent)	unopposed	unopposed
Majority		unopposed	unopposed
Independent hold			
