= 1978 Western Isles Islands Council election =

← 1974	8 May 1978	1982 →

All 30 seats to Western Isles Council 16 seats needed for a majority
	First party
Leader	Donald Macauley
Party	Independent
Leader's seat	Uig West
Last election	30 seats, 100.0%
Seats won	30
Seat change	0
Popular vote	2,590
Percentage	100.0%
Swing	0.0
Council control before election
Donald Macauley
Independent
Council control after election
Donald Macauley
Independent

The second election to Western Isles Islands Council was held on 8 May 1978 as part of the wider 1978 Scottish regional elections. All candidates stood as Independents, and 23 candidates were elected unopposed.

In a rematch of the council vote in 1974, incumbent convener Donald Macaulay defeated a challenge from former Stornoway Provost Sandy Matheson and was re-elected to a second term in office.

== Aggregate results ==
Western Isles Council election, 1978
Party	Seats	Gains	Losses	Net gain/loss	Seats %	Votes %	Votes	+/−
Independent	30	0	0	0	100.00	100.00	2,590	0.0

== Ward results ==
Port of Ness
Party	Candidate	Votes	%
Independent	Angus Morrison	237	54.0%
Independent	Donald Morrison (Incumbent)	200	45.6%
Majority		37	8.4%
Independent hold			

Dell
Party	Candidate	Votes	%
Independent	Kathleen MacAskill (Incumbent)	unopposed	unopposed
Majority		unopposed	unopposed
Independent hold			

Barvas
Party	Candidate	Votes	%
Independent	W. MacLeod	237	72.7%
Independent	John Paterson (Incumbent)	89	27.3%
Majority		148	45.4%
Independent hold			

Shawbost
Party	Candidate	Votes	%
Independent	Malcolm MacLeod (Incumbent)	unopposed	unopposed
Majority		unopposed	unopposed
Independent hold			

Carloway
Party	Candidate	Votes	%
Independent	Jack MacArthur (Incumbent)	unopposed	unopposed
Majority		unopposed	unopposed
Independent hold			

Uig West
Party	Candidate	Votes	%
Independent	Donald MacAulay (Incumbent)	unopposed	unopposed
Majority		unopposed	unopposed
Independent hold			

Gress
Party	Candidate	Votes	%
Independent	K.A. MacIver (Incumbent)	unopposed	unopposed
Majority		unopposed	unopposed
Independent hold			

Coll
Party	Candidate	Votes	%
Independent	Murdo MacDonald (Incumbent)	unopposed	unopposed
Majority		unopposed	unopposed
Independent hold			

Laxdale
Party	Candidate	Votes	%
Independent	Donald MacLeod (Incumbent)	176	58.9%
Independent	A.A. MacLeod	122	40.8%
Majority		54	18.1%
Independent hold			

Coulregrein
Party	Candidate	Votes	%
Independent	Kenneth MacDonald (Incumbent)	unopposed	unopposed
Majority		unopposed	unopposed
Independent hold			

Manor Park
Party	Candidate	Votes	%
Independent	James MacRae (Incumbent)	305	87.9%
Independent	T.A. Woodcock	42	12.1%
Majority		263	75.8%
Independent hold			

Bayhead
Party	Candidate	Votes	%
Independent	Alasdair Rae MacKenzie (Incumbent)	unopposed	unopposed
Majority		unopposed	unopposed
Independent hold			

Goathill
Party	Candidate	Votes	%
Independent	M.A. Macmillan	unopposed	unopposed
Majority		unopposed	unopposed
Independent hold			

Newton
Party	Candidate	Votes	%
Independent	Sandy Matheson (Incumbent)	unopposed	unopposed
Majority		unopposed	unopposed
Independent hold			

Sandwick
Party	Candidate	Votes	%
Independent	William MacDonald (Incumbent)	unopposed	unopposed
Majority		unopposed	unopposed
Independent hold			

Aignish
Party	Candidate	Votes	%
Independent	John Crichton (Incumbent)	unopposed	unopposed
Majority		unopposed	unopposed
Independent hold			

Tiumpan
Party	Candidate	Votes	%
Independent	Donald MacKay (Incumbent)	unopposed	unopposed
Majority		unopposed	unopposed
Independent hold			

North Lochs
Party	Candidate	Votes	%
Independent	M.D. MacLeod	263	52.8%
Independent	Donald Martin (Incumbent)	233	46.8%
Majority		30	6.0%
Independent hold			

Kinloch
Party	Candidate	Votes	%
Independent	Ian MacLennan (Incumbent)	unopposed	unopposed
Majority		unopposed	unopposed
Independent hold			

Pairc
Party	Candidate	Votes	%
Independent	D.M. MacKay	113	46.5%
Independent	A. Kennedy	90	37.0%
Independent	A. MacLeod	40	16.5%
Majority		23	9.5%
Independent hold			

Tarbert
Party	Candidate	Votes	%
Independent	Donald MacKinnon (Incumbent)	unopposed	unopposed
Majority		unopposed	unopposed
Independent hold			

Bays
Party	Candidate	Votes	%
Independent	D. MacDonald (Incumbent)	unopposed	unopposed
Majority		unopposed	unopposed
Independent hold			

Obbe
Party	Candidate	Votes	%
Independent	Wilfred Leonard (Incumbent)	246	55.5%
Independent	G. MacLeod	197	44.5%
Majority		49	11.0%
Independent hold			

Paible
Party	Candidate	Votes	%
Independent	Roderick MacLeod (Incumbent)	unopposed	unopposed
Majority		unopposed	unopposed
Independent hold			

Lochmaddy
Party	Candidate	Votes	%
Independent	James Robertson (Incumbent)	unopposed	unopposed
Majority		unopposed	unopposed
Independent hold			

Benbecula
Party	Candidate	Votes	%
Independent	Calum MacLellan (Incumbent)	unopposed	unopposed
Majority		unopposed	unopposed
Independent hold			

Iochdar
Party	Candidate	Votes	%
Independent	Dugald Morrison (Incumbent)	unopposed	unopposed
Majority		unopposed	unopposed
Independent hold			

Lochboisdale
Party	Candidate	Votes	%
Independent	Roderick MacKinnon (Incumbent)	unopposed	unopposed
Majority		unopposed	unopposed
Independent hold			

Northbay
Party	Candidate	Votes	%
Independent	Reginald Allan (Incumbent)	unopposed	unopposed
Majority		unopposed	unopposed
Independent hold			

Castlebay
Party	Candidate	Votes	%
Independent	Hugh Morrison (Incumbent)	unopposed	unopposed
Majority		unopposed	unopposed
Independent hold			

== By-elections ==
A by-election was held in Carloway in March 1979 following the resignation of Rev Jack MacArthur, convener of the council's Education Committee, who had moved to Skye to work as a minister for the Church of Scotland in Broadford.

1978 Carloway by-election
Party	Candidate	Votes	%
Independent	Malcolm MacArthur	174	59.2%
Independent	George MacLeod	120	40.8%
Majority		54	18.4%
Independent hold			
