= 1986 Western Isles Islands Council election =

1986 Scottish regional election

← 1982	8 May 1986	1990 →

All 30 seats to Western Isles Council 16 seats needed for a majority
	First party
Leader	Sandy Matheson
Party	Independent
Leader's seat	Newton
Last election	30 seats, 100.0%
Seats before	30
Seats won	30
Seat change	0
Popular vote	5,443
Percentage	99.7%
Swing	▼0.3%
Council control before election
Sandy Matheson
Independent
Council control after election
Sandy Matheson
Independent

The fourth election to Western Isles Islands Council was held on 8 May 1986 as part of the wider 1986 Scottish regional elections.

The election was the first Western Isles council election to be contested by a political party, with the Scottish Labour Party putting up a single candidate in the Northbay ward. The Labour candidate was unsuccessful, gaining 5.2% of the vote in the ward.

== Aggregate results ==
Western Isles Council election, 1986 Turnout: 5,058
Party	Seats	Gains	Losses	Net gain/loss	Seats %	Votes %	Votes	+/−
Independent	30	0	0	0	100.00	99.68	5,443	▼0.3
Labour	0	0	0	0	0.00	0.32	16	New

== Ward results ==
Port of Ness
Party	Candidate	Votes	%
Independent	D.J. MacLennan	unopposed	unopposed
Majority		unopposed	unopposed
Independent hold			

Dell
Party	Candidate	Votes	%
Independent	Kathleen MacAskill (Incumbent)	unopposed	unopposed
Majority		unopposed	unopposed
Independent hold			

Barvas
Party	Candidate	Votes	%
Independent	R. MacDonald	290	72.3%
Independent	W. MacLeod (Incumbent)	111	27.7%
Majority		179	44.6%
Independent hold			

Shawbost
Party	Candidate	Votes	%
Independent	Donald MacLeod (Incumbent)	unopposed	unopposed
Majority		unopposed	unopposed
Independent hold			

Carloway
Party	Candidate	Votes	%
Independent	Alex MacDonald (Incumbent)	unopposed	unopposed
Majority		unopposed	unopposed
Independent hold			

Uig
Party	Candidate	Votes	%
Independent	J. MacLeod	339	75.7%
Independent	Donald MacAulay (Incumbent)	109	24.3%
Majority		179	44.6%
Independent hold			

Gress
Party	Candidate	Votes	%
Independent	Angus Graham (Incumbent)	unopposed	unopposed
Majority		unopposed	unopposed
Independent hold			

Coll
Party	Candidate	Votes	%
Independent	D. MacLean (Incumbent)	unopposed	unopposed
Majority		unopposed	unopposed
Independent hold			

Laxdale
Party	Candidate	Votes	%
Independent	L. MacIver	280	66.7%
Independent	K. McPhail	89	21.2%
Independent	Allan MacLeod (Incumbent)	51	12.1%
Majority		191	45.5%
Independent hold			

Coulregrein
Party	Candidate	Votes	%
Independent	J.M. MacMillan (Incumbent)	unopposed	unopposed
Majority		unopposed	unopposed
Independent hold			

Manor Park
Party	Candidate	Votes	%
Independent	A. MacKenzie (Incumbent)	unopposed	unopposed
Majority		unopposed	unopposed
Independent hold			

Bayhead
Party	Candidate	Votes	%
Independent	Murdo Afrin (Incumbent)	unopposed	unopposed
Majority		unopposed	unopposed
Independent hold			

Goathill
Party	Candidate	Votes	%
Independent	M. MacFarlane	255	59.4%
Independent	M.A. MacMillan (Incumbent)	174	40.6%
Majority		81	18.8%
Independent hold			

Newton
Party	Candidate	Votes	%
Independent	Sandy Matheson (Incumbent)	unopposed	unopposed
Majority		unopposed	unopposed
Independent hold			

Sandwick
Party	Candidate	Votes	%
Independent	D.L. Afrin	228	53.6%
Independent	P. McKibbin	197	46.4%
Majority		31	7.2%
Independent hold			

Aignish
Party	Candidate	Votes	%
Independent	John Crichton (Incumbent)	301	61.7%
Independent	D.H.M. MacIver	187	38.3%
Majority		114	13.4%
Independent hold			

Tiumpan
Party	Candidate	Votes	%
Independent	D. MacLeod	346	66.2%
Independent	Donald MacKay (Incumbent)	185	34.8%
Majority		161	30.4%
Independent hold			

North Lochs
Party	Candidate	Votes	%
Independent	D.R. MacAulay (Incumbent)	unopposed	unopposed
Majority		unopposed	unopposed
Independent hold			

Kinloch
Party	Candidate	Votes	%
Independent	Ian MacLennan (Incumbent)	unopposed	unopposed
Majority		unopposed	unopposed
Independent hold			

Pairc
Party	Candidate	Votes	%
Independent	D. MacKay (Incumbent)	unopposed	unopposed
Majority		unopposed	unopposed
Independent hold			

Tarbert
Party	Candidate	Votes	%
Independent	Donald MacKinnon (Incumbent)	unopposed	unopposed
Majority		unopposed	unopposed
Independent hold			

Bays
Party	Candidate	Votes	%
Independent	C. MacDonald	288	80.0%
Independent	D. MacDonald (Incumbent)	72	20.0%
Majority		216	60.0%
Independent hold			

Obbe
Party	Candidate	Votes	%
Independent	A. MacLean	330	83.1%
Independent	J. Luty	67	16.9%
Majority		263	66.2%
Independent hold			

Paible
Party	Candidate	Votes	%
Independent	N.M. Johnson (Incumbent)	unopposed	unopposed
Majority		unopposed	unopposed
Independent hold			

Lochmaddy
Party	Candidate	Votes	%
Independent	James Robertson (Incumbent)	unopposed	unopposed
Majority		unopposed	unopposed
Independent hold			

Benbecula
Party	Candidate	Votes	%
Independent	Ray Burnett	170	46.4%
Independent	J.L. MacArthur (Incumbent)	131	35.8%
Independent	N.C. Buchanan	65	17.8%
Majority		41	10.6%
Independent hold			

Iochdar
Party	Candidate	Votes	%
Independent	Mary Bremnar (Incumbent)	unopposed	unopposed
Majority		unopposed	unopposed
Independent hold			

Lochboisdale
Party	Candidate	Votes	%
Independent	J. MacIntyre (Incumbent)	370	57.9%
Independent	I.F. Forrester	146	22.8%
Independent	N. Johnstone	123	19.2%
Majority		224	35.1%
Independent hold			

Northbay
Party	Candidate	Votes	%
Independent	R. MacKinnon	190	61.7%
Independent	J. MacNeil	100	32.5%
Labour	J. Grant	16	5.2%
Independent	D. MacLean	2	0.6%
Majority		90	29.2%
Independent hold			

Castlebay
Party	Candidate	Votes	%
Independent	Hugh Morrison (Incumbent)	95	38.5%
Independent	S. McIntosh	80	32.4%
Independent	J. MacDougall	72	29.1%
Majority		15	6.1%
Independent hold			
