= Keeper of the King's Conscience =

Position in the English judiciary

Keeper of the King's Conscience was a position in the English judiciary before the advent of parliamentary representative democracy. The person appointed as Keeper of the King's Conscience was usually a bishop. He was responsible for overseeing the international affairs of the monarchy and for delivering justice on behalf of the king. Today this position has become the Lord Chancellor. During the period beginning from William the Conqueror to Henry VIII of England, the person holding the Keeper of the King's Conscience post also held high position in the church.
