= Angmendus =

Historical figure from England

Angmendus may have held the role of the first Lord Chancellor (of the Kingdom of Kent), being appointed in 605, during the reign of Æthelberht of Kent (Ethelbert). Other sources suggest that the first ruler to appoint a Chancellor was Edward the Confessor, who is said to have adopted the practice of sealing documents instead of personally signing them.
