= List of peerages created for lord chancellors and lord keepers =

This page lists all peerages held by the Lord High Chancellor of Great Britain and Lord Keeper of the Great Seal, whether created or inherited before or after their Lord Chancellorship. Extant titles are in bold.

== Peerages created for lord high chancellors of Great Britain ==
Created for their respective Lord Chancellorships
Created before their respective Lord Chancellorships

Title	Created	Lord Chancellor	Current status	Notes	Ref
=== Reign of Queen Anne, 1707–1714 ===
Baron Cowper	14 December 1706	William Cowper, MP	Extinct; 18 July 1905		LG
Baron Harcourt	3 September 1711	Sir Simon Harcourt, MP	Extinct; 17 June 1830	During Chancellorship	LG
=== Reign of King George I, 1714–1727 ===
**Baron Parker**	10 March 1716	Sir Thomas Parker, MP	Extant		LG
Earl Cowper	20 March 1718	The 1st Baron Cowper	Extinct; 18 July 1905	During Chancellorship	LG
Viscount Harcourt	24 July 1721	The 1st Baron Harcourt	Extinct; 17 June 1830	2nd Viscount created Earl Harcourt in 1749	LG
**Earl of Macclesfield**	15 November 1721	The 1st Baron Parker	Extant	During Chancellorship	LG
Baron King	29 May 1725	Sir Peter King	Extinct; 31 January 2018	8th Baron created Earl of Lovelace in 1838	
=== Reign of King George II, 1727–1760 ===
**Baron Hardwicke**	16 November 1733	Sir Philip Yorke, MP	Extant		
**Baron Talbot**	5 December 1733	Charles Talbot, MP	Extant (Note: The title merged with the Earldom of Shrewsbury in 1849.)	2nd Baron created Earl Talbot in 1761. 3rd Baron in turn created Earl Talbot in 1784.	
**Earl of Hardwicke**	2 April 1754	The 1st Baron Hardwicke	Extant	During Chancellorship	
Baron Henley	27 May 1760	Sir Robert Henley	Extinct; 5 July 1786	During Chancellorship	
=== Reign of King George III, 1760–1820 ===
Earl of Northington	19 May 1764	The 1st Baron Henley	Extinct; 5 July 1786	During Chancellorship	
**Baron Camden**	17 July 1765	Sir Charles Pratt	Extant		
**Baron Apsley**	24 January 1771	Henry Bathurst	Extant	Succeeded as 2nd Earl Bathurst in 1775	
Baron Thurlow	3 June 1778	Edward Thurlow, MP	Extinct; 12 September 1806		
Baron Loughborough	17 June 1780	Alexander Wedderburn, MP	Extinct; 2 January 1805		
**Earl Camden**	13 May 1786	The 1st Baron Camden	Extant	2nd Earl created Marquess Camden in 1812	
**Baron Thurlow**	11 June 1792	The 1st Baron Thrlow	Extant	(Note: Peerage created with a special remainder.)	
**Baron Loughborough**	31 October 1795	The 1st Baron Loughborough	Extant	During Chancellorship	
**Baron Eldon**	18 July 1799	Sir John Scott, MP	Extant		
**Earl of Rosslyn**	21 April 1801	The 1st Baron Loughborough	Extant	Retirement Honour	
**Baron Erskine**	10 February 1806	Thomas Erskine, MP	Extant (Note: The title merged with the Earldom of Buchan in 1960.)		
On 5 February 1811, George Prince of Wales became the Prince Regent
=== Reign of King George IV, 1820–1830 ===
**Earl of Eldon**; **Viscount Encombe**	7 July 1821	The 1st Baron Eldon	Extant	During Chancellorship	
Baron Lyndhurst	25 April 1827	Sir John Copley, MP	Extinct; 12 October 1863		
=== Reign of King William IV, 1830–1837 ===
Baron Brougham and Vaux	22 November 1830	Henry Brougham, MP	Extinct; 7 May 1868		
**Baron Cottenham**	20 January 1836	Sir Charles Pepys, MP	Extant		
=== Reign of Queen Victoria, 1837–1901 ===
**Baron Campbell**	30 June 1841	Sir John Campbell	Extant (Note: The title merged with the Barony of Stratheden in 1861.)		
**Earl of Cottenham**; **Viscount Crowhurst**	11 June 1850	The 1st Baron Cottenham	Extant	Retirement Honour	
Baron Truro	15 July 1850	Sir Thomas Wilde	Extinct; 8 March 1899		
Baron Cranworth	20 December 1850	Sir Robert Rolfe	Extinct; 26 July 1868		
Baron St Leonards	1 March 1852	Sir Edward Sugden	Extinct; 1 June 1985		
**Baron Chelmsford**	1 March 1858	Sir Frederic Thesiger, MP	Extant	3rd Baron created Viscount Chelmsford in 1921	
**Baron Brougham and Vaux**	22 March 1860	The 1st Baron Brougham and Vaux	Extant		
**Baron Westbury**	27 June 1861	Sir Richard Bethell, MP	Extant		
**Baron Cairns**	27 February 1867	Sir Hugh Cairns, MP	Extant		
Baron Hatherley	9 December 1868	Sir William Wood	Extinct; 10 July 1881		
**Baron Selborne**	23 October 1872	Sir Roundell Palmer, MP	Extant		
**Earl Cairns**; **Viscount Garmoyle**	27 September 1878	The 1st Baron Cairns	Extant	During Chancellorship	
**Earl of Selborne**; **Viscount Wolmer**	30 December 1882	The 1st Baron Selborne	Extant	During Chancellorship	
Baron Halsbury	26 June 1885	Sir Hardinge Giffard, MP	Extinct; 31 December 2010		
Baron Herschell	8 February 1886	Sir Farrer Herschell	Extinct; 26 October 2008		
Earl of Halsbury; Viscount Tiverton	19 January 1898	The 1st Baron Halsbury	Extinct; 31 December 2010	During Chancellorship	
=== Reign of King Edward VII, 1901–1910 ===
Baron Loreburn	8 January 1906	Sir Robert Reid	Extinct; 30 November 1923		
=== Reign of King George V, 1910–1936 ===
Viscount Haldane	27 March 1911	Richard Haldane, MP	Extinct; 19 August 1928		
Earl Loreburn	4 July 1911	The 1st Baron Loreburn	Extinct; 30 November 1923	During Chancellorship	
**Baron Buckmaster**	14 June 1915	Sir Stanley Buckmaster, MP	Extant		
Baron Finlay	19 December 1916	Sir Robert Finlay, MP	Extinct; 30 June 1945		
Viscount Cave	14 November 1918	Sir George Cave	Extinct; 29 March 1928		
Baron Birkenhead	3 February 1919	Sir F. E. Smith, Bt., MP	Extinct; 16 February 1985		
Viscount Finlay	27 March 1919	The 1st Baron Finlay	Extinct; 30 June 1945	Retirement Honour	
Viscount Birkenhead	15 June 1921	The 1st Baron Birkenhead	Extinct; 16 February 1985	During Chancellorship	
Earl of Birkenhead; Viscount Furneaux	28 November 1922	The 1st Viscount Birkenhead	Extinct; 16 February 1985	Retirement Honour	
**Baron Hailsham**	5 April 1928	Sir Douglas Hogg, MP	Extant		
Baron Sankey	21 June 1929	Sir John Sankey	Extinct; 6 February 1948		
**Viscount Hailsham**	4 July 1929	The 1st Baron Hailsham	Extant	Retirement Honour	
Viscount Sankey	30 January 1932	The 1st Baron Sankey	Extinct; 6 February 1948	During Chancellorship	
**Viscount Buckmaster**	24 February 1933	The 1st Baron Buckmaster	Extant		
Baron Maugham	7 October 1935	Sir Frederic Maugham	Extinct; 23 March 1958	Law Lord	
=== Reign of King Edward VIII, 1936 ===
no peerage creations for Lord Chancellors
=== Reign of King George VI, 1936–1952 ===
**Viscount Caldecote**	6 September 1939	Sir Thomas Inskip, MP	Extant		
Viscount Maugham	22 September 1939	The Baron Maugham	Extinct; 13 March 1981	Retirement Honour	
Viscount Simon	20 May 1940	Sir John Simon, MP	Extinct; 15 August 2021		
Baron Simonds	18 April 1944	Sir Gavin Simonds	Extinct; 28 June 1971	Law Lord	
Baron Jowitt	2 August 1945	Sir William Jowitt, MP	Extinct; 16 August 1957		
Viscount Jowitt	20 January 1947	The 1st Baron Jowitt	Extinct; 16 August 1957	During Chancellorship	
Earl Jowitt; Viscount Stevenage	24 December 1951	The 1st Viscount Jowitt	Extinct; 16 August 1957	Retirement Honour	
=== Reign of Queen Elizabeth II, 1952–2022 ===
Baron Simonds	24 June 1952	The Baron Simonds	Extinct; 28 June 1971	During Chancellorship	
Viscount Simonds	18 October 1954	The 1st Baron Simonds	Extinct; 28 June 1971	Retirement Honour	
Viscount Kilmuir	19 October 1954	Sir David Maxwell Fyfe, MP	Extinct; 27 January 1967		
**Baron Dilhorne**	17 July 1962	Sir Reginald Manningham-Buller, Bt., MP	Extant		
Earl of Kilmuir; Baron Fyfe of Dornoch	20 July 1962	The 1st Viscount Kilmuir	Extinct; 27 January 1967	Retirement Honour	
Baron Gardiner	15 January 1964	Gerald Gardiner	Extinct; 7 January 1990	Life peerage	
**Viscount Dilhorne**	7 December 1964	The 1st Baron Dilhorne	Extant	Retirement Honour	
Baron Hailsham of St Marylebone	30 June 1970	Quintin Hogg, MP	Extinct; 12 October 2001	Life peerage	
Baron Elwyn-Jones	11 March 1974	Sir Elwyn Jones, MP	Extinct; 4 December 1989	Life peerage	
**Baron Mackay of Clashfern**	6 July 1979	James Mackay	Extant	Life peerage	
**Baron Irvine of Lairg**	25 March 1987	Derry Irvine	Extant	Life peerage	
Baron Havers	22 June 1987	Sir Michael Havers	Extinct; 1 April 1992	Life peerage	
**Baron Falconer of Thoroton**	14 May 1997	Charlie Falconer	Extant	Life peerage	
**Baron Clarke of Nottingham**	4 September 2020	Kenneth Clarke	Extant	Life peerage	
=== Reign of King Charles III, 2022–present ===
**Baron Grayling**	20 August 2024	Chris Grayling	Extant	Life peerage	
**Baron Gove**	13 May 2025	Michael Gove	Extant	Life peerage	

== Lord chancellors without peerages ==
Eligible for Peerage

Lord Chancellor	Notes	Constituency	Related peerage
Charles Yorke, KC, MP	Died before being created a Peer	Reigate	His male line descendants from his sons Philip and Joseph have held the Earldom of Hardwicke since 1790
Charles Yorke, KC, MP	Died before being created a Peer	Cambridge University	His male line descendants from his sons Philip and Joseph have held the Earldom of Hardwicke since 1790
Jack Straw	Currently living as a commoner	Blackburn	
Liz Truss	Currently living as a commoner	South West Norfolk	
Sir David Lidington	Currently living as a commoner	Aylesbury	
David Gauke	Currently living as a commoner	South West Hertfordshire	
Sir Robert Buckland, KC	Currently living as a commoner	South Swindon	
Dominic Raab	Currently living as a commoner	Esher and Walton	
Sir Brandon Lewis	Currently living as a commoner	Great Yarmouth	
Alex Chalk, KC	Currently living as a commoner	Cheltenham	
Shabana Mahmood	Currently living as a commoner	Birmingham Ladywood	
David Lammy	Currently living as a commoner	Tottenham	
Alex Norris	Currently living as a commoner	Nottingham North and Kimberley	

== See also ==
- List of lord chancellors and lord keepers
- List of peerages held by prime ministers of the United Kingdom
- List of peerages created for speakers of the House of Commons
