= 1974 Western Isles Islands Council election =

1974 Scottish local government election

7 May 1974	1978 →

All 30 seats to Western Isles Council 16 seats needed for a majority
	First party
Leader	Donald Macauley
Party	Independent
Leader's seat	Uig West
Seats won	30
Popular vote	6,430
Percentage	100.0%
Council Convener after election
Donald Macauley
Independent

The first election to the Western Isles Islands Council was held on 7 May 1974 as part of the wider 1974 Scottish regional elections. All candidates stood as Independents, and 16 candidates were elected unopposed.

Several members of political parties ran as independent candidates. This included Roderick MacLeod in Shawbost, who had contested the Western Isles constituency for the Conservatives in 1970, and Mary McCormack, election agent for Labour candidate Andrew Wilson in February 1974, both of whom were unsuccessful.

After the election, Reverend Donald Macaulay and Stornoway Provost Sandy Matheson were tied in a 15-15 vote among councillors to become the council's first convener. Macaulay was elected upon the drawing of a lot.

== Aggregate results ==
Western Isles Council election, 1974
Party	Seats	Gains	Losses	Net gain/loss	Seats %	Votes %	Votes	+/−
Independent	30				100.00	100.00	6,430	

== Ward results ==
Stornoway Newton
Party	Candidate	Votes	%
Independent	Sandy Matheson	369	71.9%
Independent	Alasdair MacLeod	144	28.1%
Majority		225	43.8%
Independent hold			

Stornoway Goathill
Party	Candidate	Votes	%
Independent	Albert Nicoll	unopposed	unopposed
Majority		unopposed	unopposed
Independent hold			

Stornoway Bayhead
Party	Candidate	Votes	%
Independent	Alasdair Rae MacKenzie	341	73.2%
Independent	Marie MacMillan	125	26.8%
Majority		216	46.4%
Independent hold			

Stornoway Manor
Party	Candidate	Votes	%
Independent	James Macrae	unopposed	unopposed
Majority		unopposed	unopposed
Independent hold			

Aignish
Party	Candidate	Votes	%
Independent	John Crichton	unopposed	unopposed
Majority		unopposed	unopposed
Independent hold			

Tiumpan
Party	Candidate	Votes	%
Independent	Donald Mackay	unopposed	unopposed
Majority		unopposed	unopposed
Independent hold			

Gress
Party	Candidate	Votes	%
Independent	Peter MacLeod	310	59.3%
Independent	George Mackay	213	40.7%
Majority		97	18.6%
Independent hold			

Coll
Party	Candidate	Votes	%
Independent	Kenneth MacDonald	284	52.1%
Independent	James MacLennan	261	47.9%
Majority		23	4.2%
Independent hold			

Port of Ness
Party	Candidate	Votes	%
Independent	Donald Morrison	277	60.0%
Independent	Roderick Morrison	185	40.0%
Majority		92	20.0%
Independent hold			

Dell
Party	Candidate	Votes	%
Independent	Kathleen MacAskill	unopposed	unopposed
Majority		unopposed	unopposed
Independent hold			

Barvas
Party	Candidate	Votes	%
Independent	John Paterson	unopposed	unopposed
Majority		unopposed	unopposed
Independent hold			

Shawbost
Party	Candidate	Votes	%
Independent	Malcolm MacLeod	238	41.0%
Independent	Roderick MacLeod	147	25.3%
Independent	William MacLeod	145	25.0%
Independent	Angus MacLeod	51	8.8%
Majority		91	15.7%
Independent hold			

Laxdale
Party	Candidate	Votes	%
Independent	Donald MacLeod	unopposed	unopposed
Majority		unopposed	unopposed
Independent hold			

Coulregrein
Party	Candidate	Votes	%
Independent	Kenneth MacDonald	unopposed	unopposed
Majority		unopposed	unopposed
Independent hold			

Sandwick
Party	Candidate	Votes	%
Independent	William MacDonald	228	57.9%
Independent	Mary McCormack	166	42.1%
Majority		92	15.8%
Independent hold			

Uig East
Party	Candidate	Votes	%
Independent	Jack Macarthur	371	81.4%
Independent	Norman Maciver	49	10.7%
Independent	Malcolm Macarthur	36	7.9%
Majority		332	70.7%
Independent hold			

Uig West
Party	Candidate	Votes	%
Independent	Donald Macaulay	unopposed	unopposed
Majority		unopposed	unopposed
Independent hold			

North Lochs
Party	Candidate	Votes	%
Independent	Donald Martin	282	53.5%
Independent	Angus MacLeod	217	43.5%
Majority		65	10.0%
Independent hold			

Kinloch
Party	Candidate	Votes	%
Independent	Ian Maclennan	unopposed	unopposed
Majority		unopposed	unopposed
Independent hold			

Lochs Park
Party	Candidate	Votes	%
Independent	Malcolm Macinnes	189	77.7%
Independent	Joyce MacKay	54	22.2%
Majority		135	55.5%
Independent hold			

Harris North
Party	Candidate	Votes	%
Independent	Donald Mackinnon	318	72.8%
Independent	John Halford-MacLeod	119	27.2%
Majority		119	45.6%
Independent hold			

Harris Middle
Party	Candidate	Votes	%
Independent	Andrew Mundy	unopposed	unopposed
Majority		unopposed	unopposed
Independent hold			

Harris South
Party	Candidate	Votes	%
Independent	Wilfred Leonard	unopposed	unopposed
Majority		unopposed	unopposed
Independent hold			

North Uist North
Party	Candidate	Votes	%
Independent	Roderick MacLeod	338	73.6%
Independent	Montague Ford	121	26.4%
Majority		217	47.2%
Independent hold			

North Uist South
Party	Candidate	Votes	%
Independent	James Robertson	193	50.8%
Independent	John Macdonald	156	41.1%
Independent	James Macarthur	31	8.2%
Majority		37	9.7%
Independent hold			

Benbecula
Party	Candidate	Votes	%
Independent	Calum Maclennan	unopposed	unopposed
Majority		unopposed	unopposed
Independent hold			

South Uist
Party	Candidate	Votes	%
Independent	Dugald Morrison	unopposed	unopposed
Majority		unopposed	unopposed
Independent hold			

Lochboisdale
Party	Candidate	Votes	%
Independent	Roderick Mackinnon	272	57.6%
Independent	John Macinnes	200	42.4%
Majority		72	15.2%
Independent hold			

Barra North
Party	Candidate	Votes	%
Independent	Reginald Allan	unopposed	unopposed
Majority		unopposed	unopposed
Independent hold			

Barra South
Party	Candidate	Votes	%
Independent	Hugh Morrison	unopposed	unopposed
Majority		unopposed	unopposed
Independent hold			
