= Lord Lieutenant of the Western Isles =

Ceremonial officer in Western Isles, Scotland

Lord Lieutenant of the Western Isles is a ceremonial position in the Western Isles, Scotland. The following people have served in the position:

- Samuel Longbotham, 16 May 1975 – 1983
- Granville Leveson-Gower, 5th Earl Granville, 14 April 1983 to 7 December 1993
- John Morrison, 2nd Viscount Dunrossil, 7 December 1993 – 22 March 2000
- Alexander Matheson, 27 April 2001 – 16 November 2016
- Donald Martin, 20 December 2016 – 21 March 2022
- Iain Macaulay, 21 March 2022 – present
