= John Morrison, 2nd Viscount Dunrossil =

British diplomat

The Right Honourable The Viscount Dunrossil CMG JP

2nd Lord Lieutenant of the Western Isles
- In office 4 November 1993 – 22 March 2000
- Monarch: Elizabeth II
- Preceded by: Granville Leveson-Gower, 5th Earl Granville
- Succeeded by: Alexander Matheson

127th Governor of Bermuda
- In office 1983–1988
- Monarch: Elizabeth II
- Preceded by: Sir Richard Posnett
- Succeeded by: Sir Desmond Langley

Personal details
- Born: 22 May 1926
- Died: 22 March 2000 (aged 73) Lanzarote
- Spouse(s): Mavis Dawn Spencer-Payne; 3 July 1951–1969; Diana Mary Cunliffe Vise m. 1969
- Children: 3 sons, 1 daughter
- Education: Oriel College, Oxford
- Profession: Soldier, diplomat, colonial administrator

John William Morrison, 2nd Viscount Dunrossil, CMG, JP (22 May 1926 – 22 March 2000) was a British diplomat. Lord Dunrossil was British High Commissioner to Fiji, Nauru and Tuvalu and later to Barbados. His career reached its peak when he was appointed Governor and Commander-in-Chief of Bermuda in 1983. While in South Africa he supported Nelson Mandela during his imprisonment by helping him gain a law degree from the University of London.

== Early life and education ==
Morrison was educated at Fettes College in Edinburgh before serving in the RAF between 1945 and 1948 and reaching the rank of Flight Lieutenant. Between 1948 and 1950 he read History at Oriel College, Oxford; his course being shorter than the usual three years due to the Second World War. He became President of the Conservative Association during his time at Oxford.

== Career ==
The early years of Morrison's diplomatic career were wide-ranging, including as Assistant Private Secretary to The Viscount Swinton and as First Secretary in Dacca, East Pakistan (now Bangladesh). His career would go on to focus mainly on the Commonwealth countries. In February 1961, he inherited the viscountcy of Dunrossil from his father, William Morrison, 1st Viscount Dunrossil, who died in office as the Governor-General of Australia.

Dunrossil was posted to South Africa, and was present during the trial of Nelson Mandela and his sentencing to 27 years' imprisonment. He subsequently obtained study materials for Mandela in order that he might achieve a law degree from the University of London.

His career reached its peak from 1978 onwards when he was appointed High Commissioner to Fiji, Nauru and Tuvalu. He then became High Commissioner to Barbados and the Eastern Caribbean in 1982 before being appointed Governor and Commander-in-Chief of Bermuda in 1983. His time in Bermuda was very successful mainly, as John Ure argues, due to his "genial temperament" and "social standing" meaning that he was able to settle the troubles of the region that had preceded his appointment. Lord Dunrossil was appointed a Companion of the Order of St Michael and St George (CMG) in the 1981 Birthday Honours for his diplomatic service.

== Later career ==
Upon retirement in 1988, Lord Dunrossil took on several directorships and also played an active part as a cross-bench peer in the House of Lords. He left the House in 1999 as he was not one of the elected hereditary peers allowed to remain in the Lords. Lord Dunrossil therefore devoted himself to spending time at Dunrossil House, his ancestral home in the Outer Hebrides, becoming a Justice of the Peace (JP). He was appointed Lord Lieutenant of the Western Isles in 1993, holding this post until his death on holiday from a heart attack in Lanzarote in 2000.

== Personal life ==
Lord Dunrossil married twice, firstly to Mavis Dawn Spencer-Payne on 3 July 1951. The couple had three sons and one daughter, including his heir, Andrew William Reginald Morrison, who was born in 1953. Mavis, Viscountess Dunrossil, is a governor of the Cotswold School.

He divorced his first wife in 1969 and remarried the same year to Diana Mary Cunliffe Vise who became Viscountess Dunrossil upon their marriage. The couple had two children.

== Arms ==
Coat of arms of William Morrison, 1st Viscount Dunrossil (except Scotland)
Notes Earl Marshal’s Warrant 14 July 1952, Granted 14 August 1953. Agent Richmond Herald. Grants: 115 / 188. Crest A Viking galley with one mast and sail furled proper flying from the masthead a pennon Argent charged with a raven volant Sable. Escutcheon Azure on a Pale Ermine between two Gannets reversed volant to the dexter their wings expanded palewise proper a representation of the Mace of the House of Commons Or. Motto An Tighnearna Mo Bhuachaille (The Lord is my Shepherd)

Coat of arms of William Morrison, 1st Viscount Dunrossil (in Scotland)
Notes Petition to Lord Lyon 17 December 1959, matriculated 18 April 1960. (College of Arms: Scotland IV 143). Coronet Coronet of a Viscount Crest Issuant from waves of the Sea Azure crested Argent a Mount Vert thereon an embattled Wall Azure masoned Argent charged with a Portcullis Or and issuant therefrom a Cubit Arm naked proper the hand grasping a Dagger Azure hilted Or Escutcheon Per bend sinister Gules and Argent a Demi-Lion rampant issuant Or armed and langued Azure holding in his paws a Battleaxe the Shaft curved of the third and the Axehead of the fourth in chief and in base issuant from the Sea undy Vert and Or a Tower Sable Windows and Port Or over all a Bend sinister embattled Azure charged with an Open Crown Or jewelled Gules between two Fleurs-de-lys Argent; within a Bordure Vert for difference. Supporters On either side a Lion regardant Or armed and langued Gules collared Vert supporting between the exterior forepaw and interior hindpaw a Battleaxe Azure the shaft embowed Motto Above the Crest: Teaghlach Phabbay (The household or family of Phabbay); Below the Shield: An Tighnearna Mo Bhuachaille (The Lord is my Shepherd)

Honorary titles
Preceded by The Earl Granville	Lord Lieutenant of the Western Isles; 1993–2000	Vacant Title next held by Alexander Matheson
Peerage of the United Kingdom
Preceded by William Morrison	Viscount Dunrossil; 1961–2000	Succeeded by Andrew Morrison
