= Block warden =

Block warden may refer to:

- Nazi Blockleiter
- Block warden system first experimented during the 1957 Battle of Algiers (a.k.a. quadrillage), and which would become a common technique of counter-insurgency throughout the 20th century. Also used for example during the "Dirty War" in Argentina and in the Portuguese Colonial War.
