= Viscount Dunrossil =

Title in the Peerage of the United Kingdom

Viscountcy Dunrossil
- Creation date: 13 November 1959
- Created by: Queen Elizabeth II
- Peerage: Peerage of the United Kingdom
- First holder: William Morrison
- Present holder: Andrew Morrison
- Heir apparent: Callum Morrison
- Remainder to: the 1st Viscount's heirs male lawfully begotten
- Status: Extant

Viscount Dunrossil, of Vallaquie in the Isle of North Uist in the County of Inverness, is a title in the Peerage of the United Kingdom. It was created on 12 November 1959 for the Conservative politician William Morrison upon his retirement as Speaker of the House of Commons. His son, the second Viscount, notably served as High Commissioner to Fiji and as Governor of Bermuda. As of 2017 the title is held by the latter's son, the third Viscount, who succeeded in 2000.

The viscountcy is the most recently created hereditary peerage created for a former Speaker which is still extant; all Speakers of the Commons after the 1st Viscount either received life peerages, died in office, or, having received a hereditary peerage, died without issue.

The family seat is Dunrossil House, near Lochmaddy, Isle of the North Uist.

== Viscounts Dunrossil (1959) ==
- William Morrison, 1st Viscount Dunrossil (1893–1961)
- John William Morrison, 2nd Viscount Dunrossil (1926–2000)
- Andrew William Reginald Morrison, 3rd Viscount Dunrossil (born 1953)

The heir apparent is the present holder's son, the Hon. Callum Alasdair Brundage Morrison (born 1994)

== Line of succession ==
- William Shepherd Morrison, 1st Viscount Dunrossil (1893–1961)
  - John William Morrison, 2nd Viscount Dunrossil (1926–2000)
    - Andrew William Reginald Morrison, 3rd Viscount Dunrossil (born 1953)
      - (1) Hon. Callum Alasdair Brundage Morrison (born 1994)
    - (2) Hon. Ranald John Morrison (born 1956)
      - (3) Richard Donald Morrison (born 1983)
      - (4) Alexander Thomas Morrison (born 1988)
    - (5) Hon. Alasdair Godfrey Morrison (born 1962)
  - Hon. Alasdair Andrew Orr Morrison (1929–2009)
    - (6) William Alasdair Ewing Morrison (born 1960)
  - Rev. Hon. Nial Ranald Morrison (1932–1991)
    - (7) Neil William Alexander Morrison (born 1961)
      - (8) Alexander Morrison (born 1997)
      - (9) Cade Morrison (born 2001)
    - (10) John Forbes Morrison (born 1963)
      - (11) Niall Morrison (born 2002)
    - (12) Hugh Robert Shepherd Morrison (born 1965)

== Arms ==
Coat of arms of William Morrison, 1st Viscount Dunrossil (except Scotland)
| Notes Earl Marshal’s Warrant 14 July 1952, Granted 14 August 1953. Agent Richmond Herald. Grants: 115 / 188. Crest A Viking galley with one mast and sail furled proper flying from the masthead a pennon Argent charged with a raven volant Sable. Escutcheon Azure on a Pale Ermine between two Gannets reversed volant to the dexter their wings expanded palewise proper a representation of the Mace of the House of Commons Or. Motto An Tighnearna Mo Bhuachaille (The Lord is my Shepherd) |

Coat of arms of William Morrison, 1st Viscount Dunrossil (in Scotland)
| Notes Petition to Lord Lyon 17 December 1959, matriculated 18 April 1960. (College of Arms: Scotland IV 143). Coronet Coronet of a Viscount Crest Issuant from waves of the Sea Azure crested Argent a Mount Vert thereon an embattled Wall Azure masoned Argent charged with a Portcullis Or and issuant therefrom a Cubit Arm naked proper the hand grasping a Dagger Azure hilted Or Escutcheon Per bend sinister Gules and Argent a Demi-Lion rampant issuant Or armed and langued Azure holding in his paws a Battleaxe the Shaft curved of the third and the Axehead of the fourth in chief and in base issuant from the Sea undy Vert and Or a Tower Sable Windows and Port Or over all a Bend sinister embattled Azure charged with an Open Crown Or jewelled Gules between two Fleurs-de-lys Argent; within a Bordure Vert for difference. Supporters On either side a Lion regardant Or armed and langued Gules collared Vert supporting between the exterior forepaw and interior hindpaw a Battleaxe Azure the shaft embowed Motto Above the Crest: Teaghlach Phabbay (The household or family of Phabbay); Below the Shield: An Tighnearna Mo Bhuachaille (The Lord is my Shepherd) |
