= Baron Pelham =

Baron Pelham may refer to:

- Thomas Pelham, 1st Baron Pelham (1653–1712), Baron Pelham of Laughton
- Thomas Pelham-Holles, 1st Duke of Newcastle (1693–1768), his son and Baron Pelham of Stanmer
