= Lord Warden =

Lord Warden may refer to:

- Lord Warden of the Cinque Ports, ceremonial official in the United Kingdom
- Lord Warden of the Stannaries, office in the governance of Cornwall
- Lord Warden of the Marches, office in the governments of Scotland and England
- HMS Lord Warden, British warship

== See also ==
- Warden (disambiguation)
