= Alexander Matheson (Scottish politician) =

Scottish pharmacist, businessman and politician

Alexander Matheson CVO OBE DL FRPharmS is a pharmacist, businessman, and local politician from Stornoway.

Matheson was elected to Stornoway Town Council in 1967 and became the town's youngest Provost in 1971. He would also serve as the town's last Provost up to the town council's dissolution in 1975. In 1973, he was appointed to the Western Isles health board, becoming its chairman in 1993 until 2001. Matheson was elected to Comhairle nan Eilean Siar in 1974 and served as Convenor from 1982 until 1990. He also contested the Western Isles parliamentary constituency for the Labour Party in 1979, finishing second to incumbent MP Donald Stewart.

He was appointed Chairman of Highlands and Islands Airports Ltd. in 2001 and served until 2007. A member of the Harris Tweed Authority between 1995 and 2007 he was chairman from 2001 to 2007. He served on Stornoway Trust Estate for 40 years from 1967 until 2007 and was chairman from 1971 until 1981. In 1972 he was appointed as an Honorary Sheriff at Stornoway and continues to hold that warrant. He served on Stornoway Pier and Harbour Commission (now Stornoway Port Authority between 1968 and 2009 and was chairman from 1970 to 1972 and again from 1991 to 2001. He was President of the Islands Commission of The Conference of Peripheral Maritime Regions of Europe between 1987 and 1991.

Matheson is the chairman of Roderick Smith Ltd., his family business. He was awarded the OBE in 1990. In 1993, he was made a Fellow of the Royal Pharmaceutical Society of Great Britain and a deputy lieutenant of the Western Isles. He became Vice Lord-Lieutenant in 1994 and was appointed Lord Lieutenant in 2001, serving until 2016.

He was appointed Commander of the Royal Victorian Order (CVO) in the 2016 New Year Honours. In 2023, Matheson was made a Freeman of the Western Isles, only the sixth person to receive this honour.

Honorary titles
Vacant Title last held by The Viscount Dunrossil	Lord Lieutenant of the Western Isles; 2001 – 2016	Vacant Title next held by Donald Martin
