= Makgill =

Makgill is a surname of Scottish origin. Notable people with the surname include:

- Clan Makgill, Lowland Scottish clan
- George Makgill (1868–1926), Scottish novelist and right-wing propagandist
- George Makgill, 13th Viscount of Oxfuird (1934–2003), Scottish peer
- Ian Alexander Arthur Makgill, 14th Viscount of Oxfuird or Viscount of Oxfuird, title in the Peerage of Scotland
- Robert Haldane Makgill (1870–1946), New Zealand surgeon, pathologist, military leader and public health administrator
- Sir George Makgill, 9th Baronet (1812–1878), Scottish peer

== See also ==
- Magill
- McGill (disambiguation)
