= James Crichton (disambiguation) =

James Crichton (1560–1582) was a Scottish polymath.

James Crichton may also refer to:

- James Crichton (soldier) (1879–1961), Irish-born New Zealand recipient of the Victoria Cross
- James G. Crichton (born 1893), American Republican politician in the California legislature
- James Crichton of Frendraught, Scottish landowner involved in tragic fire in 1630
- James Crichton, 1st Viscount Frendraught (died c. 1664/65), Scottish peer
