= James Crichton of Frendraught =

Scottish landowner

Sir James Crichton of Frendraught
- Born: c. 1599; Frendraught, Scotland
- Died: 1667; Frendraught, Scotland
- Spouse: Lady Elizabeth Gordon
- Children: James Crichton; George Crichton; William Crichton; Francis Crichton; Elizabeth Crichton; Isobel Crichton; Margaret Crichton
- Parents: Sir James Crichton of Frendraught (father); Janet Gordon (mother)

James Crichton of Frendraught or Frendraucht (1599–1667) was a Scottish landowner and survivor of the Fire of Frendraught in October 1630. Several of his guests were killed at Frendraught Castle and arson was suspected, though the facts of the case were widely disputed and remain unresolved.

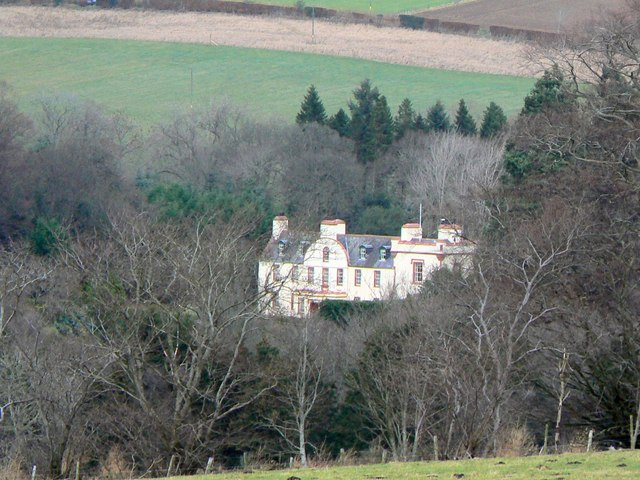
Traces remain of old Frendraught Castle at the later house, said to be haunted by Elizabeth Gordon, Lady Frendraught

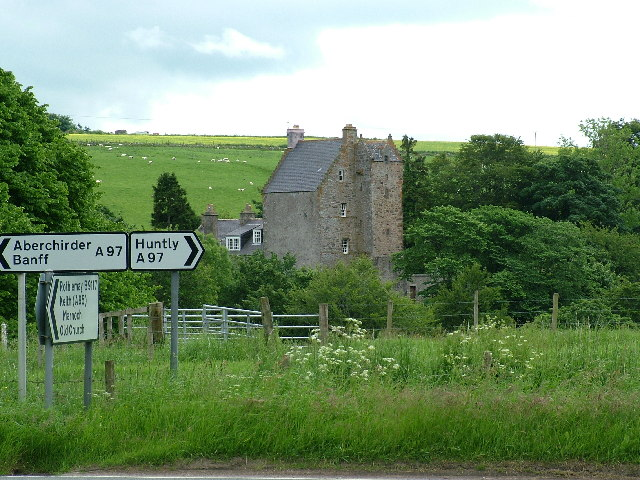
Kinnairdy Castle was Crichton of Frendraught's second home in Aberdeenshire. The castle masonry has now been harled

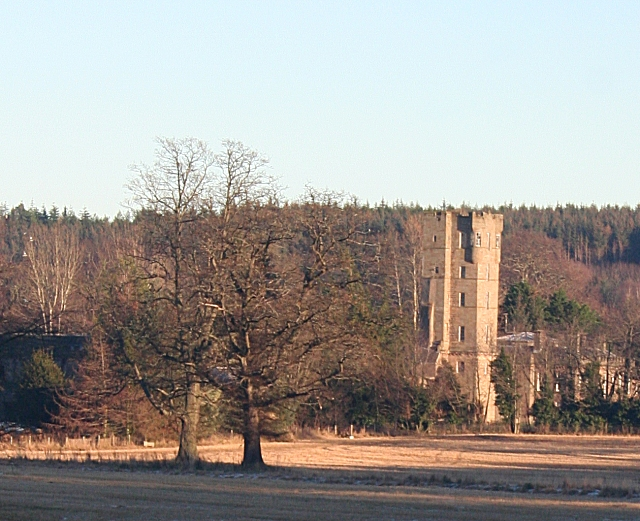
Elizabeth Gordon, Lady Frendraught was married at Gordon Castle but was refused entry on 19 October 1630

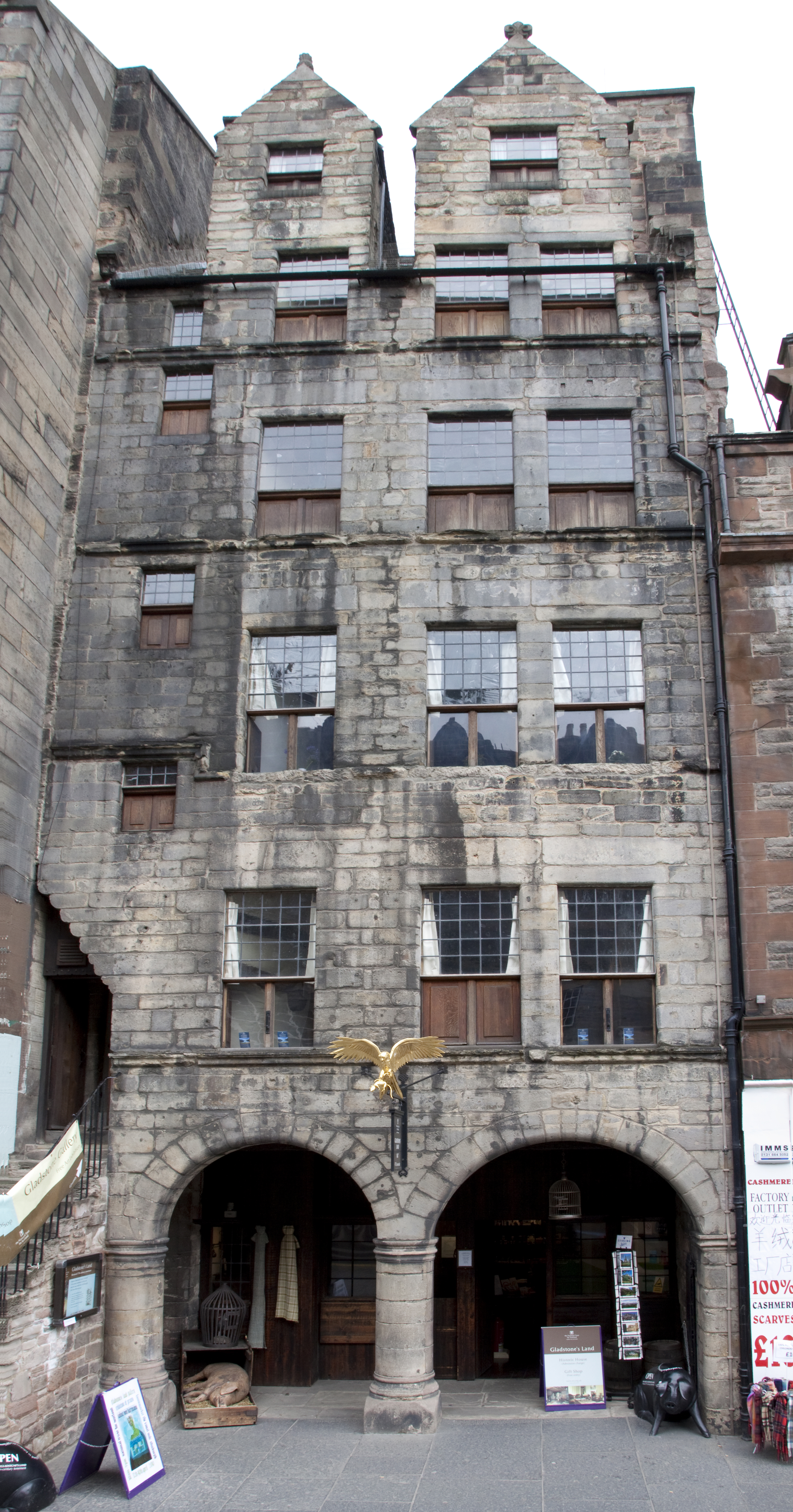
James Crichton lived at Gladstone's Land in Edinburgh after the fire at Frendraught

== Family background ==
James Crichton of Frendraught was descended from William Crichton, 1st Lord Crichton. His parents were James Crichton of Frendraught and Janet Gordon, a daughter of Alexander Gordon of Lesmoir. His aunt, Katherine Gordon, married Alexander Burnett and lived at Crathes Castle.

After he inherited, Crichton was known as the "Laird of Frendraught" or simply, "Frendraught". Frendraught Castle, now rebuilt, is about 6 miles (9.7 km) east of Huntly, Aberdeenshire, Scotland.

He married Elizabeth Gordon, the eldest daughter of John Gordon, 13th Earl of Sutherland, at the Castle of Bog of Gight now called Gordon Castle on 25 February 1619. Married women in early modern Scotland did not change their surnames when they married, and she was known as "Elizabeth Gordon, Lady Frendraught" or "Lady Frendraught". Their eldest son, also James Crichton, was created Viscount Frendraught in 1642. His descendants are the present representatives of the Clan Crichton.

== Feuds and fire ==
In January 1630, Crichton's followers fought with the Gordons of Rothiemay over the issue of fishing rights on the River Deveron. William Gordon of Rothiemay was fatally injured by gunshot in a confrontation between the banks of the Deveron and Frendraught Castle. He was carried home and died at Rothiemay. George Gordon, a brother of the laird of Lesmoir, also succumbed to his wounds. In a second feud with the Leslie family, Robert Crichton of Condlaw shot James Leslie in the arm on 27 September. The next month, in October 1630, James Crichton invited several friends and allies of the Gordon family to stay in his tower at Frendraught Castle in Banffshire to protect him and George Gordon, 1st Marquess of Huntly, from their enemies. The house burnt down, killing Lord Aboyne (aka Viscount of Melgum) and the younger John Gordon, laird of Rothiemay, and others. They were unable to escape or jump from the tower because the wooden stair collapsed and the windows were barred with iron stanchions or yetts. The family was accommodated in another part of the house and watched the progress of the fire from the yard. James Crichton and his wife were suspected of setting fire to their own castle. The day after the fire, Elizabeth Gordon, Lady Frendraught, dressed in a white plaid rode to Gordon Castle with her account of the fire and subsequent deaths, but she was not admitted.

James Crichton lodged his complaints with the Chancellor, George Hay, Viscount Dupplin, at Perth. Hay lived at the former Gowrie's Lodging. Crichton then moved to live in Edinburgh at Gladstone's Land on the Lawnmarket until 1635, where he was able to consult with lawyers including Thomas Hope.

His two sons joined him in Edinburgh. His wife, Elizabeth Gordon, Lady Frendraught, gained a reputation as a chief agent in the murder, and it was said she had locked the guests in the tower and dropped the key in a well. She also went to Edinburgh, but was allowed to return to the north in December. She stayed in the north with her daughters at Kinnairdy Castle on the Deveron while her husband was in Edinburgh. Lady Frendraught was a Catholic and was noted for not attending church at Aberchirder when she lived at Kinnairdy, and again when she returned to Frendraught in 1647. She signed the Solemn League and Covenant in June 1650, abjuring "her Poperie", but regretted this by 1652 and would not send her daughters to church or hear preaching.

Crichton went to Privy Council asking for justice in November 1630. On Sunday 12 December he argued and fought with John Leslie, Bishop of the Isles, in the "Little Kirk" of St Giles. The Bishop, with a "boasteous countenance", tried to punch him on the head with his "neiff" or "nefe", the Scots word for fist. But the Bishop missed, instead dashing Crichton's hat to the ground, he "dang aff his hatt in publict view and sight of the haill people conveened in the Kirk". It was said that Crichton had been standing in the Bishop's way. The conflict was probably connected with the feuds in the north, the fire, and the shooting of James Leslie.

The Scottish Privy council appointed commissioners who visited the ruins of Frendraught in April 1631 and considered the fire was started in three places inside a vaulted space. Charles I wanted the commission to torture suspects for information, but the Privy Council explained that authorising such measures in Scotland was its role. Three of Crichton's servants were accused of murder and arson, John Meldrum, his master of household John Tosch, Toshe, or Toash, and a female servant, Margaret Wood, a daughter of the laird of Colpnay (Colpy at Culsalmond). The servants were questioned in Edinburgh. Orders were given for the arrest of Frendraught's steward, Thomas Jose, the gardener John Gib, and the cook, Robert Bewlie. The chamberlains of Frendraught, John Horne and James Clerk, were also questioned. Magdalene Innes and George Spense said that the Laird and Lady of Frendraught grabbed their clothes and went down to the barnyard when they were wakened by cries of fire, thinking that the outlaw James Grant was attacking. George Spense said that Lord Melgum probably died from the "reik" (smoke inhalation) before the fire reached him. Spense's testimony was particularly significant because it was said that Lord Melgum and John Gordon of Rothiemay had cried for help from a tower window and made declarations of faith.

=== Margaret Wood ===
Margaret Wood was tortured with the boot but escaped execution. After her information proved unreliable, further "slight and spaire" torture was prescribed by the Privy Council. Lady Frendraught's opinion was sought during her questioning. Margaret Wood had initially pretended to be her sister, Jean Wood, a former servant of John Leslie, Laird of Pitcaple, and his wife Agnes Ramsay, and had made false allegations about the fire to incriminate a "baron and gentleman of good quality", meaning the Laird of Pitcaple, and her employer, Lady Frendraught. In the days after the fire she had visited Elizabeth Strathauchin or Strachan, Lady Blackhall, and been offered employment by Lady Blackhall's mother, but had already found a job in the winter months with Thomas Cheyne of Ranystoun, an Aberdeen lawyer.

She confessed to stealing money from James Crichton's "bulgett" or purse. Some of her testimony suggests she acted out of fear of Lady Frendraught. She was asked under torture if Lady Frendraught had given her three fistfuls of silver dollars, each worth five shillings. The word for fist was "neiff".

Margaret Wood was found guilty of perjury for her questionable testimony after being counselled to confess by clergy including William Struthers, a neighbour of Crichton at Gladstone's Land. This was at the instance of Lady Frendraught. She was whipped through Edinburgh and banished. John Toash was accused by Henrietta Stewart, Marchioness of Huntly, and tortured with the boot. He was held at the Tolbooth, and then in Edinburgh Castle. Henrietta Stewart and her companions wore mourning clothes to bring her complaints to Charles I when he was at Holyroodhouse for his Scottish coronation in July 1633.

=== John Meldrum ===
John Meldrum of Reidshill, a former servant of Frendraught and a kinsman of the Leslies (a brother-in-law of John Leslie of Pitcaple), was tortured at the request of Charles I. He was hanged in August 1633 for starting the fire. He was supposed to have a grudge against the laird of Frendraught as an employer, and his conviction may have deflected from the consequences of the feud. Meldrum had stolen horses from Frendraught, and he allegedly enlisted the help of an outlaw, James Grant of Carroun, to fire the tower. Sir George Ogilvy of Banff and Inchdrewer testified that Meldrum said Frendraught was awaiting an evil turn on the night before the fire. He did not know John Toash, but had heard he was an "evil conditioned and slyme youth", by all accounts likely to be guilty. Meldrum's servant Robert Wilson had said the highest stone of Frendraught Castle would be the lowest or "laighest". This was an old Scots saying, used in 1544 by Lord Fleming at Cumbernauld Castle.

John Toash's lawyer, John Nisbet, argued successfully that the case against Toash was disproved by Meldrum's conviction. As well as setting precedent and case law, accounts of the murder, and the lodging of guests in the tower at Frendraught, give some insight into the domestic arrangements of early modern houses in Scotland.

=== Lady Rothiemay ===
After the execution of Meldrum, the Gordon family continued their feud with Crichtons, enlisting the support of the Clan McGregor and the Clan Cameron to carry out raids in Morayshire and at Frendraught in 1634. The outlaw Gilderoy may have been involved. The McGregors beheaded a rustler Finlay McGrimm and sent his head to the Privy Council, as a token of their loyal service. Crichton retaliated in person but had to return to the safety of his Edinburgh lodging. Katherine Forbes, Lady Rothiemay, (a daughter of John Forbes, 8th Lord Forbes), who had lost both husband and son in the feud, was thought to be an instigator of the raids. She was said to have danced at Rothiemay with the Highlanders who raided Frendraught's barnyard. Thomas Hope, as Lord Advocate, wrote that she had "dancet with the licht horsemen in the Place of Rothiemay the cusheon dance upone hir schoulder". The "cushion-dance" was then popular at the court of Charles I, and a form of the dance, "Joan Sanderson", was described in some editions of John Playford's The Dancing Master.

Lady Rothiemay was defended by Thomas Nicolson of Carnock, who contended that the McGregors and Camerons had occupied the Place of Rothiemay and held her against her wishes. She was detained under caution in Edinburgh until her release in 1637 when she was given the keys of Rothiemay following instructions to the Privy Council on her behalf from King Charles.

== Rumour and literature ==
Gilbert Blackhall, a Catholic missionary and adherent of the Gordon family commented on the events. He had been confessor to Sophia Hay, Lady Melgum (died 1642), a daughter of the Earl of Erroll, whose husband had died in the fire. He wrote about "Frendret", which may indicate how the name was then pronounced. In Blackhall's view, Crichton of Frendraught was a Protestant whose antipathies were fuelled by the religious controversy of the day. He had ordered his servant "Jhon Tosach" to bring in combustible materials and set fire to the castle two hours after midnight.

Arthur Johnston wrote a Latin lament in Sophia Hay's voice, casting blame on Lady Frendraught, named in his poem as "Lupa", with a dirge for the two chief victims of the fire. The poems were published in Aberdeen in 1637 in his Parega. Robert Gordon of Gordonstoun, closely associated with the Sutherland family, asserted that the Crichton and his wife were innocent, describing Meldrum's theft of horses from the "park of Frendret", and repeating an argument that they had lost their silver and property charters in the fire, a loss which they would have planned to avoid.

Some 18th-century writers took the events at Frendraught and the subsequent legal proceedings as an example of the ferocity of Highland clans and the shortcomings of old feudal law in Scotland. Robert Sanders, who wrote under the pseudonym Nathaniel Spencer, told the story as if the Laird of Frendraught had set fire to the house and Meldrum was an innocent scapegoat. William Guthrie, historian and journalist, described "how powerful family animosity still operated" and "how strongly the feudal spirit prevailed". His account lays the blame for the fire on Frendraught, while emphasising that the Marquess of Huntly was able to escape the consequences of his revenge. The chronicle or narrative of the period written in the 17th century by John Spalding was published in 1792, including an influential description of the fire and the subsequent legal proceedings.

The 19th-century antiquary Charles Kirkpatrick Sharpe heard a version of the story in which Lady Frendraught had made a diabolical pact and watched the tower burn from the green, laughing and clapping, and by the light of the flames appeared "much taller than usual". Walter Scott was told that the missing keys had been found in the well during the rebuilding of Frendraught House. Although fascinated by such legends, and working to collect old ballads, C. K. Sharpe followed Sir Robert Gordon in the belief that Crichton and Lady Frendraught were innocent of firing their own house.

== Material culture ==
In 1633 James Crichton presented a silver communion cup to the parish church at Forgue, perhaps marking, so he thought, the resolution of his troubles after the Fire of Frendraught. The bowl of the cup was made in 1563 and has the hallmark of an Edinburgh goldsmith James Cok, a supporter of Mary, Queen of Scots, who was executed after the "lang siege" of Edinburgh Castle in 1573 for operating a mint. He gave silverware to other churches including Inverkeithny and Aberchirder.

Portraits by George Jamesone include those said to be of James Crichton of Frendraught (aged 36 in 1634) and his wife Lady Elizabeth Gordon (aged 34 in 1637).
