= Lord Crichton =

The Lordship of Parliament of Crichton (Lord Crichton) was created in the Peerage of Scotland around 1443 for William Crichton, who was Chancellor of Scotland (1439–1443 & 1448–1454). The third lord made the lordship become forfeited in 1484. It was recreated in 1642, along with the Viscountcy of Frendraught, for James Crichton, and was forfeit again on the attainder of the 4th Viscount Frendraught in 1690.

== Lords Crichton (c. 1443) ==
- William Crichton, 1st Lord Crichton (d. 1454)
- James Crichton, jure uxoris, 2nd Lord Crichton (d. c. 1455)
- William Crichton, 3rd Lord Crichton (d. c. 1493) (forfeit 1484)

== See also ==
- Lords Crichton of Sanquhar
- Viscounts Frendraught and Lords Crichton

== See also ==
- Clan Crichton
