= Viscount of Frendraught =

Viscountcy of Frendraught
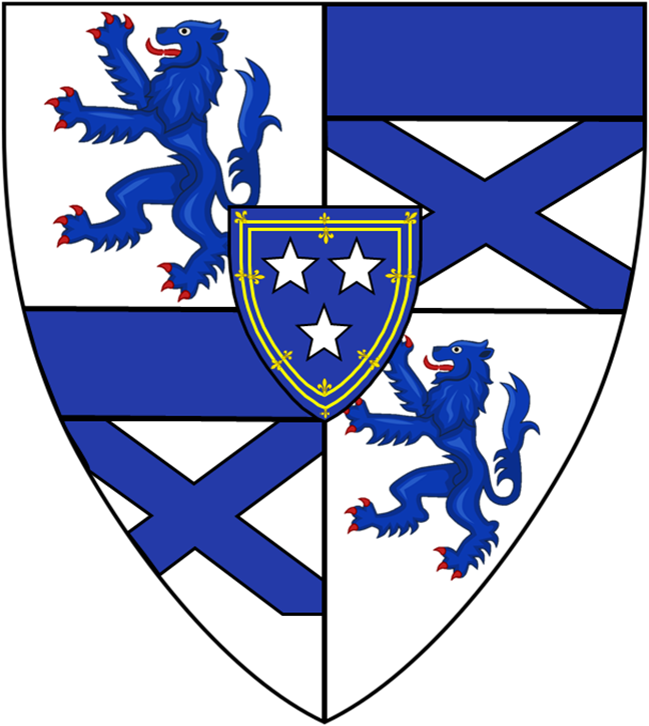
- Creation date: 1642
- Created by: Charles I
- First holder: James Crichton, 1st Viscount Frendraught
- Last holder: Lewis Crichton, 4th Viscount Frendraught
- Subsidiary titles: Lord Crichton
- Status: Attainted in 1690
- Former seat: Auchingoul House
- Motto: God Send Grace

Viscount of Frendraught was a title in the Peerage of Scotland, historically associated with the last Crichtons of Frendraught.

It was created on 29 August 1642, along with the title Lord Crichton, for James Crichton, son of James Crichton of Frendraught, who thereafter became known as Crichton of Kinnairdie. The Crichtons of Frendraught were heirs-male of William Crichton, 1st Lord Crichton, who was Lord Chancellor under James II and whose title had been forfeit in 1484.

== Viscounts of Frendraught (1642) ==
- James Crichton, 1st Viscount of Frendraught (c. 1620–1663) was the eldest son of Sir James Crichton of Frendraught.
- James Crichton, 2nd Viscount of Frendraught (1643–1676) was the eldest son of the 1st Viscount.
- William Crichton, 3rd Viscount of Frendraught (1670–1686) was the eldest son of the 2nd Viscount.
- Lewis Crichton, 4th Viscount of Frendraught (c. 1650–1698) was a younger son of the 1st Viscount.

== Attainder ==
Lewis Crichton, 4th Viscount Frendraught – a Jacobite – served with John Graham, 1st Viscount Dundee in the 1689 rising and, as punishment, the title was attainted (i.e. forfeit) on 14 July 1690.

[Janet Crichton, daughter of the first viscount] had one son, David Makgill of Rankeilour, whose daughter, Isabella Makgill, married the Rev. William Dick, minister of Cupar. Margaret Dick, granddaughter and heiress of this minister, was married to the Hon. Frederick Maitland, sixth son of the Earl of Lauderdale, who assumed the additional name of Makgill. The eldest son of this marriage, Charles Maitland-Makgill of Rankeilour, was married in August, 1794, to Mary, daughter of David Johnstone of Lathrisk. Their eldest son, David Maitland-Makgill Crichton of Rankeilour, was born in 1801, and succeeded his grandmother in 1827.

In 1839, David Maitland Makgill was served 'heir of line' to the Viscountcy of Frendraught, but was not entitled to claim the title for the following reasons:

The fourth viscount was the legitimate holder of the title, and it was attainted in his person. Even if it had not been so, the title appears to have been confined to "heirs-male", and the Makgill branch could only claim through an heir-female, viz., Janet Crichton. ... Unless some new documents have been found bearing upon the destination of the title, the claim could have no effect now. And even though it had, there would have to be a petition presented to the King asking him to restore the forfeited title, which has not been in abeyance, but actually extinct since 1690.

== Heraldic insignia ==
The shield of Viscount Frendraught was quartered, first and fourth Argent, a lion rampant Azure; second and third Argent, a saltire and chief Azure; surtout Azure, thee mullets Argent within a bordure Or.

== See also ==
- Baron of Bognie
- Frendraught
