= William Struthers =

Scottish church minister & poet (1578-1633)

William Struther(s) (1578-1633) was a high-ranking Scottish church minister and poet. He was involved in an infamous witch trial in Edinburgh. He was renowned for his "spiced sermons". His huge endowment in his will created the Struthers Bursaries in both Edinburgh and Glasgow, which was responsible for funding many hundreds of Divinity students.

== Life ==
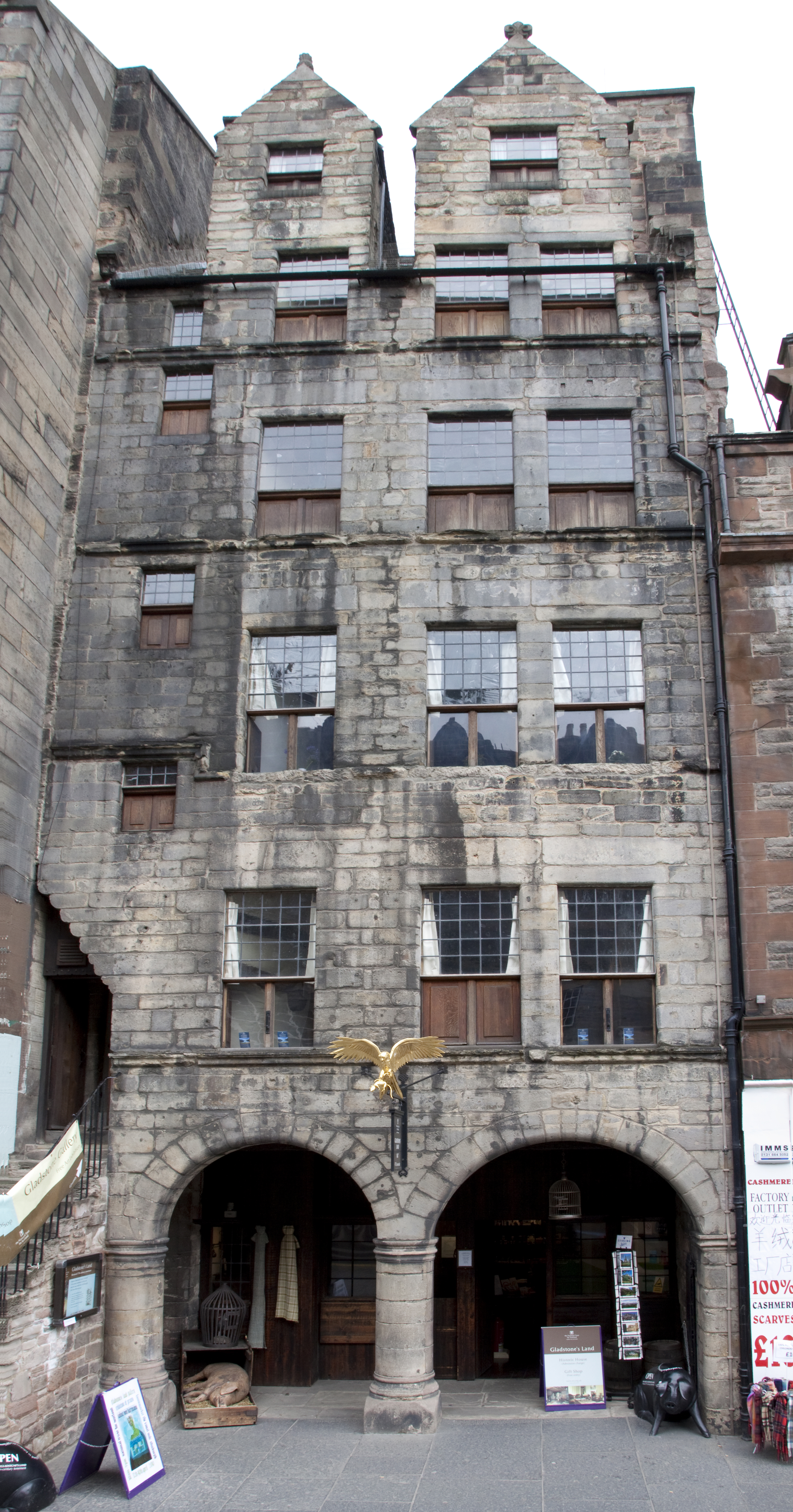
Struther's house, now known as Gladstone's Land

He was born in Glasgow around 1578 the son of the "reader" in Glasgow High Church. He studied at Glasgow University gaining an MA in 1599.

He worked as an assistant ("expectant") in the Merse near Berwick-upon-Tweed in 1602. In 1607 he was ordained as minister of Kirkintilloch. He translated to the High Kirk of Glasgow in 1612.

In 1614 he translated to St Giles High Kirk in Edinburgh, then still having a collegiate format. In 1619 he was appointed to the Court of the High Commission. In that year, he was the minister of the "College Kirk" (St Giles) with Thomas Sydserf when a new order of the communion service was introduced. Struthers provided a poem in Ancient Greek flattering James VI and I for the celebrations at Dunglass Castle, East Lothian, on 13 May 1617 when the king returned to Scotland for the first time since the Union of the Crowns. In 1619, he reminded his congregation of a riot in Edinburgh involving James VI on 17 December 1596, which was blamed on a radical Presbyterian faction.

When official news came to Edinburgh in 1623 that Prince Charles had left the country for the Spanish Match, the Earl of Melros ordered Struthers to ask his colleagues in the Church of Scotland to refrain from discussing the events in the kirks.

Struthers appears to have left St Giles at some point but rejoined by 1626, when the parish was divided into four (and the church was physically subdivided) with Struthers taking the south-east quarter. and rose to be Dean of the diocese of Edinburgh. At this time he lived 100m west of the church on the north side of the Lawnmarket (the house is preserved and now called Gladstone's Land).

Struthers was one of the clergy who counselled Margaret Wood, a servant of his Edinburgh neighbour, James Crichton of Frendraught, to confess her perjury. Wood had been tortured with the boot for her testimony after a fire at Frendraught Castle. As a perjurer, she was whipped and banished.

In 1632 he was involved in a witch trial which resulted in the execution of one woman and torture of two others. In this Marion Mure of Leith was accused of "folk healing". The trial took place in Leith. Marion was found guilty and executed on 23 February 1632 (probably at the Pilrig gibbet).

He died in Edinburgh on 9 November 1633 and is presumed buried in Greyfriars Kirkyard. His will left 6000 merks (around £4000 or £1 million in 2020) to both Edinburgh University and Glasgow University to fund bursaries for Divinity students. In Glasgow this was merged with the Gilhagie Bursary in 1858.

== Family ==
He married Elizabeth Roberton (d.1641), daughter of Andrew Roberton of Stonehall. They had six children.

== Publications ==
- Christian Observations and Resolutions (1629)
- A Looking Glasse for Princes and People with a Looking Glasse for Princes and Popes (1632)
- True Happiness, or King David's Choice (1633)
- Letter to the Earl of Airthe: Grievances of Ministers (1635)
- The Sanctuary of the Troubled Soul
