= Gladstone's Land =

Residential building in Edinburgh, Scotland

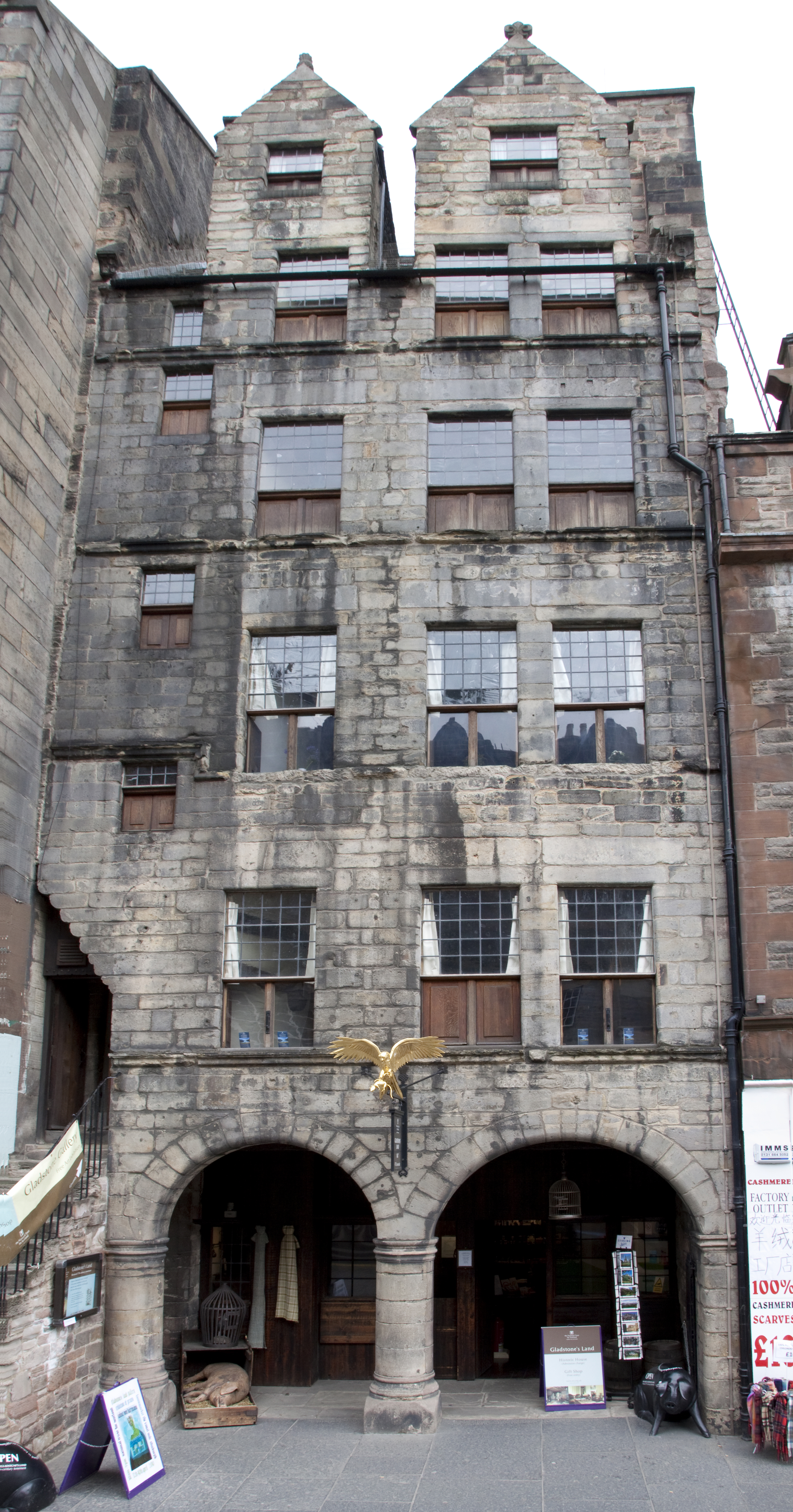
- Facade viewed from the Royal Mile

- Location within Edinburgh city centre
- Established: 1550
- Location: 477B Lawnmarket, Royal Mile, Edinburgh EH1 2NT
- Coordinates: 55°56′58″N 3°11′37″W
- Type: Historic house
- Visitors: 380,402 (2024)
- Website: https://www.nts.org.uk/visit/places/gladstones-land

Gladstone's Land is a surviving 17th-century tenement house situated in the Old Town of the city of Edinburgh, Scotland. It has been restored and furnished by the National Trust for Scotland, and is operated as a popular tourist attraction.

== Early owners and tenants ==
The "Land" (sited at 481 and 483 Lawnmarket) was originally built in 1550, but was bought and redeveloped in 1617 by a prosperous Edinburgh merchant and burgess, Thomas Gledstanes, and his wife, Bessie Cunningham. The work was completed in 1620, and includes elaborate painted ceilings. These were later covered over with plaster, but are uncovered today. Its prominent siting on the Royal Mile (between Edinburgh Castle and the Palace of Holyrood) and the extent of its accommodation mark out the affluence of its mercantile owner. Today, the restored building allows an insight into varieties of Edinburgh life of the period. The cramped conditions of the Old Town, and the physical size of the lot, meant that the house could only be extended in depth or in height. As a result, the house is six storeys tall.

Gledstanes resided on the upper floors, and let out parts of the building to an assortment of tenants of different social classes, including another merchant John Riddoch and his wife Margaret Noble, a knight James Crichton of Frendraught, and a guild officer.

John Riddoch and Margaret Noble were merchants who kept a shop and tavern on the bottom floor of the house. Issobell Johnston was their servant, and ran the tavern on their behalf. There are records of her purchasing large amounts of alcohol from John Riddoch for resale, something that was common for servants at the time. Riddoch died aboard ship in November 1632 in sight of Leith and his will lists the kind of goods they sold, including raisins, figs, ginger, sugar, sugar candy, laundry starch and smalt, cinnamon, liquorice, and clay tobacco pipes. Andrew Pringle had the shop after Riddoch, while his servant Alison Hume managed the tavern.

By 1636 Gladstones shared ownership with the merchant and shipowner David Jonkin, and their tenants included two lawyers, Andrew Hay and John Adamson. David Jonkin had been fined for breaking Edinburgh's market regulations in 1624 when it was discovered he was buying imported food in Burntisland to profiteer during a famine. He supported the Scottish Covenant in 1639 by selling firearms to the Earl of Argyll and buying a warship in Holland.

=== William Struthers and witchcraft ===
In the 1630s, Gladstone's Land was also inhabited by William Struthers, an episcopalian minister at Saint Giles cathedral. He was a prominent member of the Church of Scotland, and a supporter of both James VI and I and Charles I. Struthers played a role in the trial of Marion Muir, an accused witch. Marion had been accused of witchcraft alongside two other women, Helene Hamilton and Marion Lumisdane, after unsuccessfully being evaluated for a 'hypochondriac disorder.' Struthers heard one of several possible confessions.

== Restoration as a historic building ==
In 1934, the building was condemned and scheduled for demolition, until it was rescued by the National Trust for Scotland thanks to a donation from Helen Roberts Harrison. Under the auspices of the Trust, restoration of the building was carried out by the architect, Sir Frank Mears, in consultation with the Ancient Monuments Department of the Ministry of Works in Edinburgh. Original renaissance painted ceilings were uncovered in the process.

Today the restored premises offer a glimpse of 17th, 18th, and 20th century life, with open fires, lack of running water, and period decoration and furniture. At ground level, there is an arcade frontage and reconstructed shop booth, complete with replicas of 17th-century wares. This would originally have provided shelter for the merchant's customers. On the left of the building, a curved stone forestair with iron railings leads from the street to a door at 1st floor level.

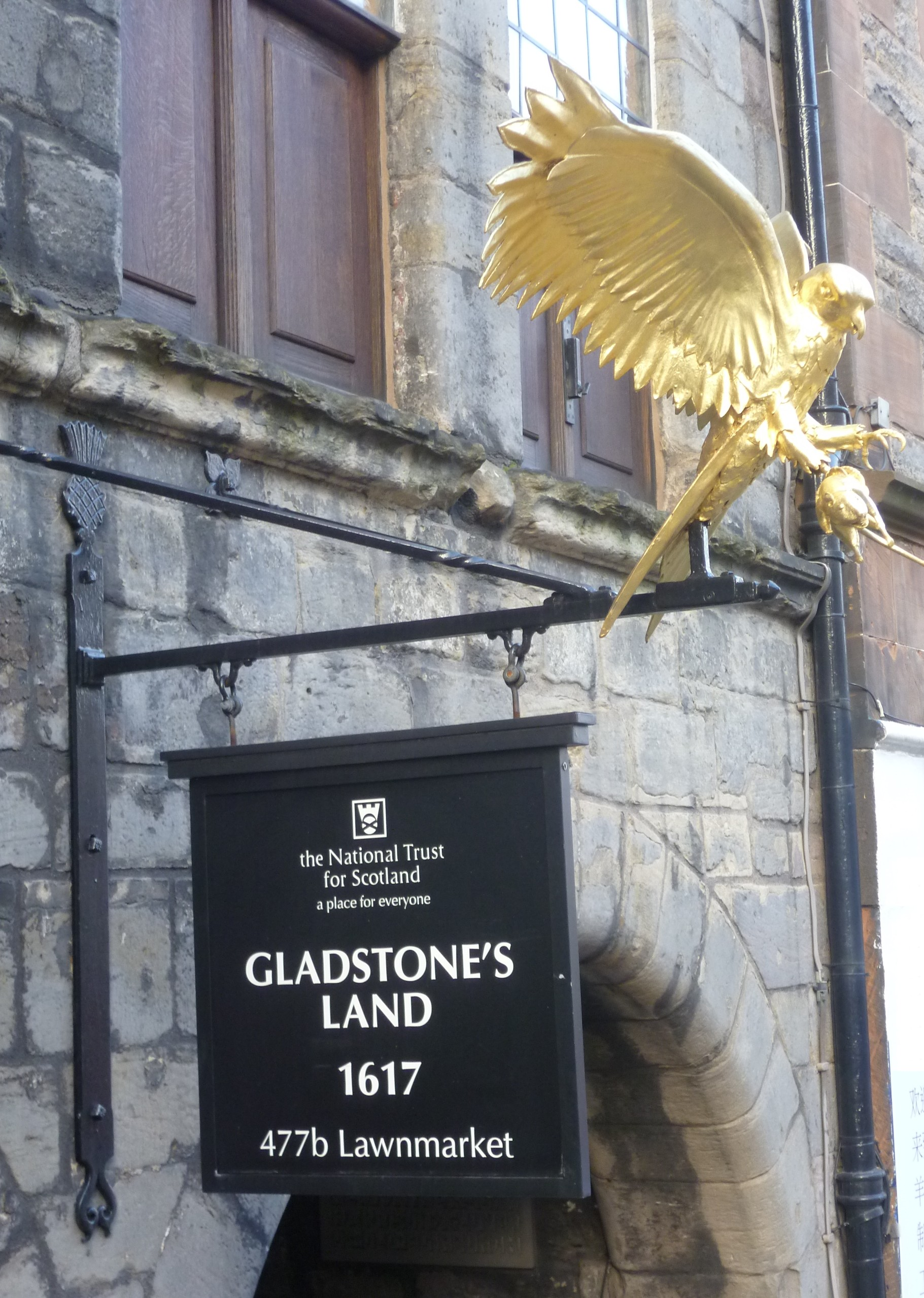
The entrance sign with a "gled" hovering above

The sign above the entrance to the building displays the date 1617 and a gilt-copper hawk with outstretched wings. Although not an original feature, the significance of this is that the name "Gledstanes" is derived from the Scots word "gled" meaning a kite or hawk.

By the late-18th century, Edinburgh's Old Town was no longer a fashionable address. Increasing pressures from population growth encouraged the flight of the affluent from cramped conditions to the developing New Town. Today, visitors to the city can contrast Gladstone's Land to the Trust's restored example of a New Town residence, The Georgian House, at No. 7 Charlotte Square.

== Gladstone's Land today ==
Gladstone's Land was closed between February 2020 and May 2021 for a £1.5 million restoration. It now has a museum on the 1st, 2nd and 3rd floors, with an ice cream parlour, cafe, and retail space on the ground floor and holiday flats on the upper floors. The museum showcases the lives of merchants, tradespeople, and workers throughout 500 years with options for daily self-guided visits and guided tours, including specialty tours Tables Through Time: Food in Gladstone's Land, A History of Tea, Medical Tales, andIntimate Lives: The history of sex and desire in Edinburgh’s Old Town.(16+).
