= Frederick Lewis Maitland (Royal Navy officer, born 1730) =

Captain The Honourable Frederick Lewis Maitland
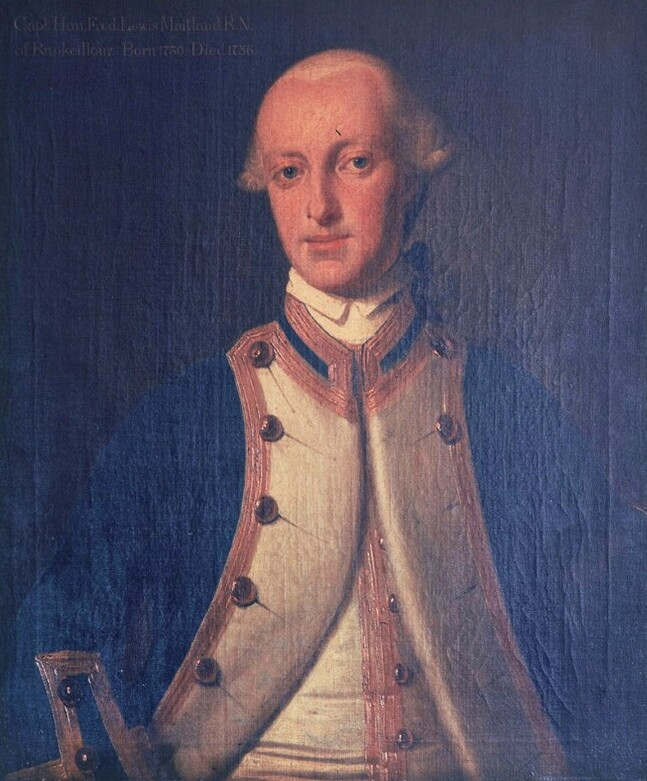
- 1760 portrait
- Born: 19 January 1730; Edinburgh, Scotland
- Died: 16 December 1786 (aged 56); Rankeillor, Fife
- Relatives: Sir Frederick Lewis Maitland (son)
- Military career
- Allegiance: Great Britain
- Branch: Royal Navy
- Service years: 1748–1786
- Rank: Captain
- Commands: HMS Port Royal; HMS Lively; HMS Renown; HMS Elizabeth; HMS Queen; HMS Grafton; HMY Princess Augusta
- Conflicts: Seven Years' War; American Revolutionary War; Battle of Ushant (1778); Battle of Grenada; Battle of Martinique (1779); Battle of Martinique (1780); Battle of Ushant (1781); Battle of Ushant (1782)

Captain Frederick Lewis Maitland (19 January 1730 – 16 December 1786) was a Royal Navy officer. He was born the sixth son of Charles Maitland, 6th Earl of Lauderdale, and Lady Elizabeth Ogilvie. His younger brother Col the Hon. John Maitland successfully defended Savannah against a combined French and American siege in 1779. He was named after his godfather, Frederick, Prince of Wales.

== Naval career ==
Frederick Lewis Maitland entered the Navy in 1748 serving as a midshipman on HMS Tavistock and HMS Speedwell. He was promoted to lieutenant in June 1750, joining HMS Otter in Barbados. and commanding HMS Lively with distinction in October 1760 at the Battle of the Windward Passage. He moved to take command of HMS Elizabeth in 1778, and in 1782 found himself serving under Admiral of the White Sir George Rodney. His capable command of several Navy ships led to a period commanding the Royal yacht between 1763 and 1775. He was promoted to Rear-Admiral of the Blue in 1786, but died before the news reached him.

== Family life ==
=== Jamaica ===
Maitland's first family was in Jamaica, while he was stationed at Port Royal during the Seven Years' War (1754–1763). He formed a relationship with Mary Arnot.

=== Scotland ===
Maitland married Margaret Dick, the heir in tail general to James Crichton, Viscount Frendraught, of Clan Crichton, who in turn was heir to Clan Makgill of Rankeilour. Through her the family came into the possession of the estates of Nether-Rankeillor. They had a number of children. The eldest son, Charles went on to inherit the estates on his father's death and assumed the surname Makgill. He married a woman named Mary Johnston and the union produced a son, David Maitland Makgill Crichton (1801–1851). This son had assumed the name Crichton in 1837, in recognition of his ancestor, James Crichton. He became a lawyer, and was called to the Scottish bar in 1822. He eventually played an important part in the formation of the Free Church of Scotland.

His third son, also named Frederick Lewis Maitland, went on to follow his father in having a distinguished career in the Royal Navy, becoming a rear admiral, the post his father was never able to take up.
