= David Jonkin =

Scottish merchant and shipowner

David Jonkin or Jenkin (died 1641) was a Scottish merchant and shipowner. He imported sugar, French wine, Swedish timber, linen from Haarlem, and lint from Poland.

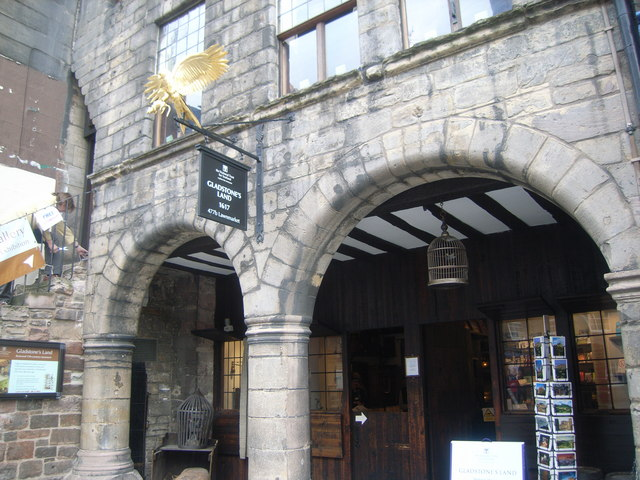
David Jonkin lived at Gladstone's Land in Edinburgh

== Career ==
An early notice of David Jonkin's merchant activity appears in a manuscript record of Edinburgh's Baillie court. It was found in April 1616 that Elizabeth Nicholson owed Jonkin £47 for goods. She had bought the items from Jonkin when her husband John Aslowane was still alive, and it was a principle of Scottish law that a husband was responsible for the payments of debts contracted by his wife.

Jonkin was able to extend credit, and in August 1623 lent 500 guilders to Alexander Erskine at The Hague. Erskine, a son of John Erskine, Earl of Mar (1558–1634), was at the court of Elizabeth Stuart, Queen of Bohemia and was equipping himself to fight in her cause.

Jonkin sold food, wine, coal, and other goods, and owned and held part shares in a number of ships. In 1625 he was part owner of the St John of Leith, built in Rotterdam in 1624, with George Gourlay as master, and had shares in the Alexander and Love of Leith, and the Bruce.

David Jonkin was fined for breaking Edinburgh's market regulations in 1624 when it was discovered he was buying imported food in Burntisland to profiteer during a famine. He sold claret and white wine to the Earl of Winton in 1628.

Jonkin and a business partner David Cruikshanks shipped cloth to Spain in the Blessing of Leith in October 1633. The textiles, re-exported rather than manufactured in Scotland, included coloured buckram, say, and "ambobrudge buckasie", a Hamburg cloth. Jonkin was Cruikshank's landlord for a property on the Royal Mile.

In 1634 Jonkin and Patrick Wood had a patent to start manufacturing cables and rope for ships and recruit foreign craftsmen for their works in Edinburgh or Leith.

Jonkin had a booth or shop situated under the Tolbooth in Edinburgh, rented from the burgh council.

By 1636 David Jonkin acquired joint ownership with Thomas Gledstanes of a house on Edinburgh's Lawnmarket on the High Street now called Gladstone's Land. They had flats in the building, and their tenants included two lawyers, Andrew Hay and John Adamson.

Jonkin supported the Scottish Covenant in 1639 by selling firearms to the Earl of Argyll and buying a warship in Holland.

He married twice. His first wife, Margaret Lauder or Baxter died in November 1625, her children were Hercules, John, and Margaret Jonkin.

Jonkin died on 28 February 1641.

His will lists his stock, including armour, and the value of his five ships, and sums of money owing to him, and debts for making gunpowder. The Earl of Moray had bought wainscot timber from Jonkin.
