= Fred Bremner =

Scottish photographer (1863–1941)

- Born: 1863
- Died: 1941 (aged 77–78)

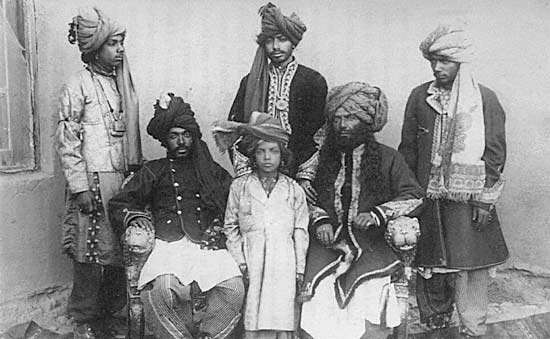
His Highness the Khan of Kalat and Sons, by Fred Bremner.

Fred Bremner (1863–1941) was a Scottish photographer. His portraiture work in British India, spanning 1882 to 1922, preserves a record of life in the period.

== Biography ==
Bremner was born in 1863 in Aberchirder (also known as Foggylone) in Scotland and was one of several sons of a photographer in Banff. He left school at the age of thirteen to join his father's studio and worked there for six years. In 1882, Bremner accepted an offer of work from his brother-in-law G. W. Lawrie, who ran a successful photography business in Lucknow, and he was assigned work throughout northern India (modern India and Pakistan).

In 1889, Bremner established his own photographic studio in Karachi, and successively studios in Quetta, Lahore and Rawalpindi. He travelled great distances to rarely photographed areas, and his work therefore captures a scarce record of rural life, landscapes and people in late 19th and early 20th century India (his work spans 1882 to 1922).

Of particular interest to military historians are Bremner's photographic studies of British and Indian Army units on station in the North West Frontier region of India (now Pakistan) during the late 1800s. These studies are distinguished by the quality of the plates, which preserve in detail the faces, equipment, uniforms and living conditions of a battalion of the line from this period. Photographed on location with the troops and then sold to order, these books are now extremely rare with very few copies available for public viewing. In particular, the exceptionally rare fine photographic (Collotype Prints) work of the 1st Battalion Wessex Regiment (Late 44th FOOT), Quetta Baluchistan, 1911.

== Works ==
- with Bingley, Sir Alfred Horsford (June 1897). Types of the Indian Army Illustrating the Races Enlisted in the Bengal, Punjab, Madras & Bombay Armies: Dedicated (by Permission) to His Excellency General Sir George Stewart White. Fred. Bremner, Rawal-Pindi & Quetta, India. London address – 110, Cannon Street, E.C.
- The 2nd Battalion Suffolk Regiment Illustrated. With brief historical account of the services of the regiment. Quetta Baluchistan: Fred Bremner. 1899.
- Baluchistan Illustrated. 1900.
- The 1st Battalion Wessex Regiment (Late 44th FOOT) Illustrated. Quetta, Baluchistan. 1911.
- My forty years in India (2nd ed.). Bath: Pagoda Tree Press. 2007 [1940]. ISBN 9781904289074.

== Gallery ==
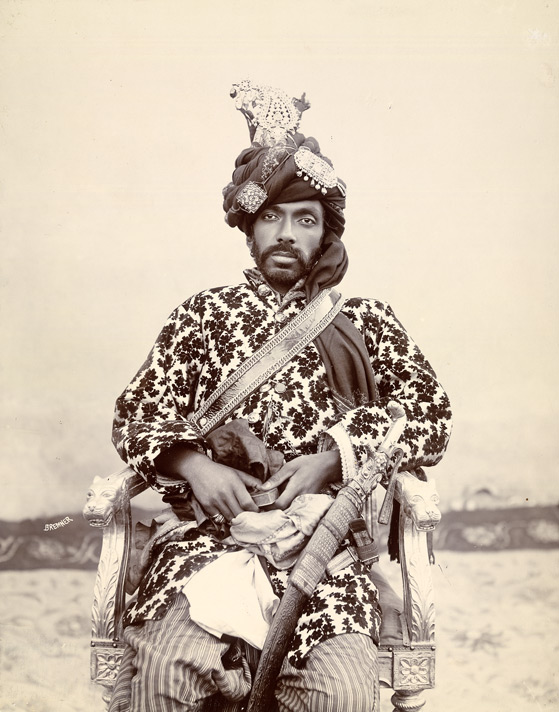
Sir Mir Mohammad Khan, Khan (ruling chief) of Kalat (in Baluchistan), c. 1894

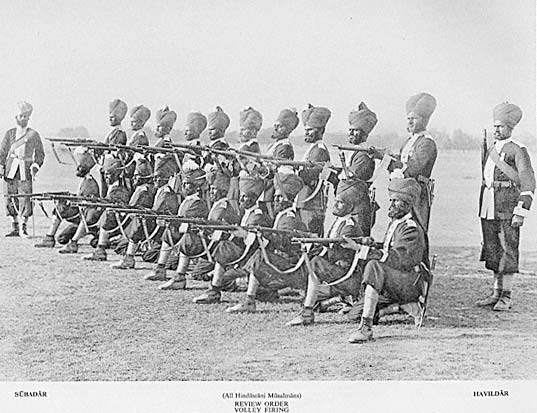
"All Hindustani Musalmans" Volley firing, c. 1895

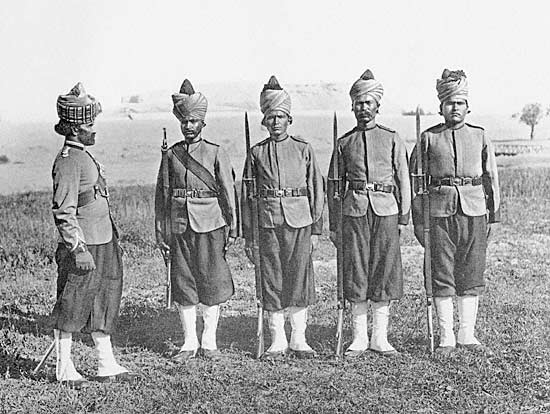
24th (The Duchess of Connaught's Own) Regiment of Bombay Infantry c. 1895

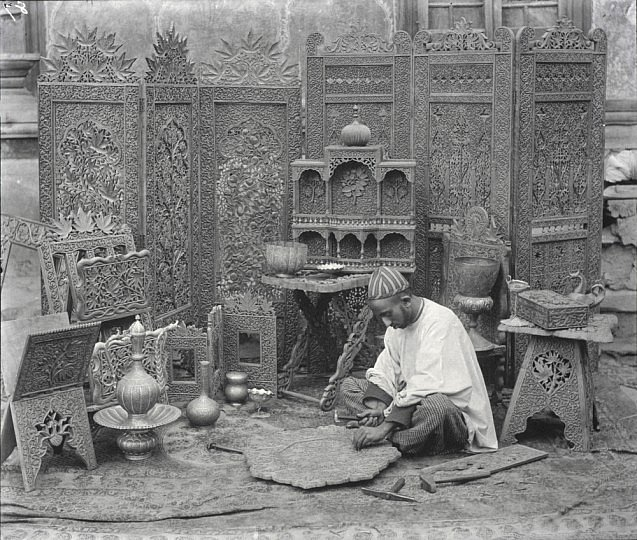
A woodcarver in Kashmir photographed by Fred Bremner in about 1896.
