= William Gordon Stables =

Scottish doctor and writer (1840–1910)

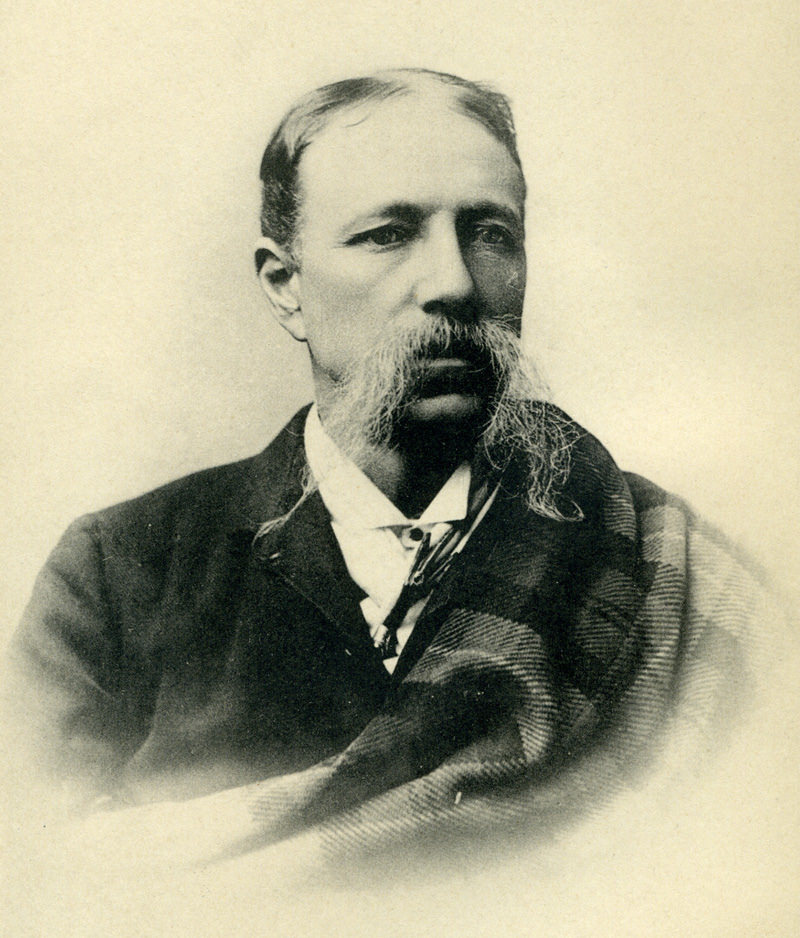
- Born: 21 May 1840; Aberchirder, Banffshire, Scotland
- Died: 10 May 1910 (aged 69); Twyford, Berkshire, England
- Occupations: Doctor, writer
- Spouse: Theresa "Lizzie" McCormack (m. 1874)
- Children: 6

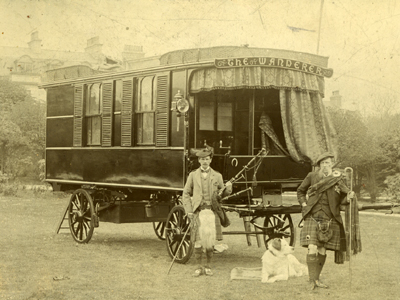
Stables (right) with his dog "Hurricane Bob" at his side, and an unknown person (left), with his caravan "The Wanderer", in the 1890s

William Gordon Stables (21 May 1840 – 10 May 1910) was a Scottish medical doctor in the Royal Navy and a prolific author of adventure fiction, primarily for boys.

== Life and career ==
William Gordon Stables was born in Aberchirder, in Banffshire (now part of Aberdeenshire) on 21 May 1840. He attended a school at Marnoch and Aberdeen Grammar School. After studying medicine at the University of Aberdeen, he served as a surgeon in the Royal Navy. He came ashore in 1875, and settled in Twyford, Berkshire.

Stables wrote over 130 books. The bulk of his large output is boys' adventure fiction, often with a nautical or historical setting. He also wrote books on health, fitness and medical subjects, and the keeping of cats and dogs.

For over 20 years Stables was the medical columnist for The Girl's Own Paper, writing under the peusdonym 'Medicus'. He was also a contributor of copious articles and stories to The Boy's Own Paper.

Stables has been regarded as one of the most prominent of the English imitators of Jules Verne, especially in his novels of polar adventure, like The Cruise of the Snowbird (1882), Wild Adventures Round the Pole (1883), From Pole to Pole (1886), and "his most ambitious novel," The Cruise of the Crystal Boat (1891).

Stables is also a notable pioneer of caravanning, being the first person to order a "gentleman's caravan" from the Bristol Wagon & Carriage Works, which he named 'Wanderer'. He travelled the length of Great Britain in 1885, resulting in his 1886 book The Cruise of the Land Yacht "Wanderer" which helped popularise the hobby.

Stables died at his home in Twyford on 10 May 1910 from tuberculosis.

== Personal life ==
Stables married Theresa "Lizzie" McCormack on 15 July 1874 and they had four sons and two daughters.

Stables was a strong opponent of vivisection.

== Selected works by Gordon Stables ==
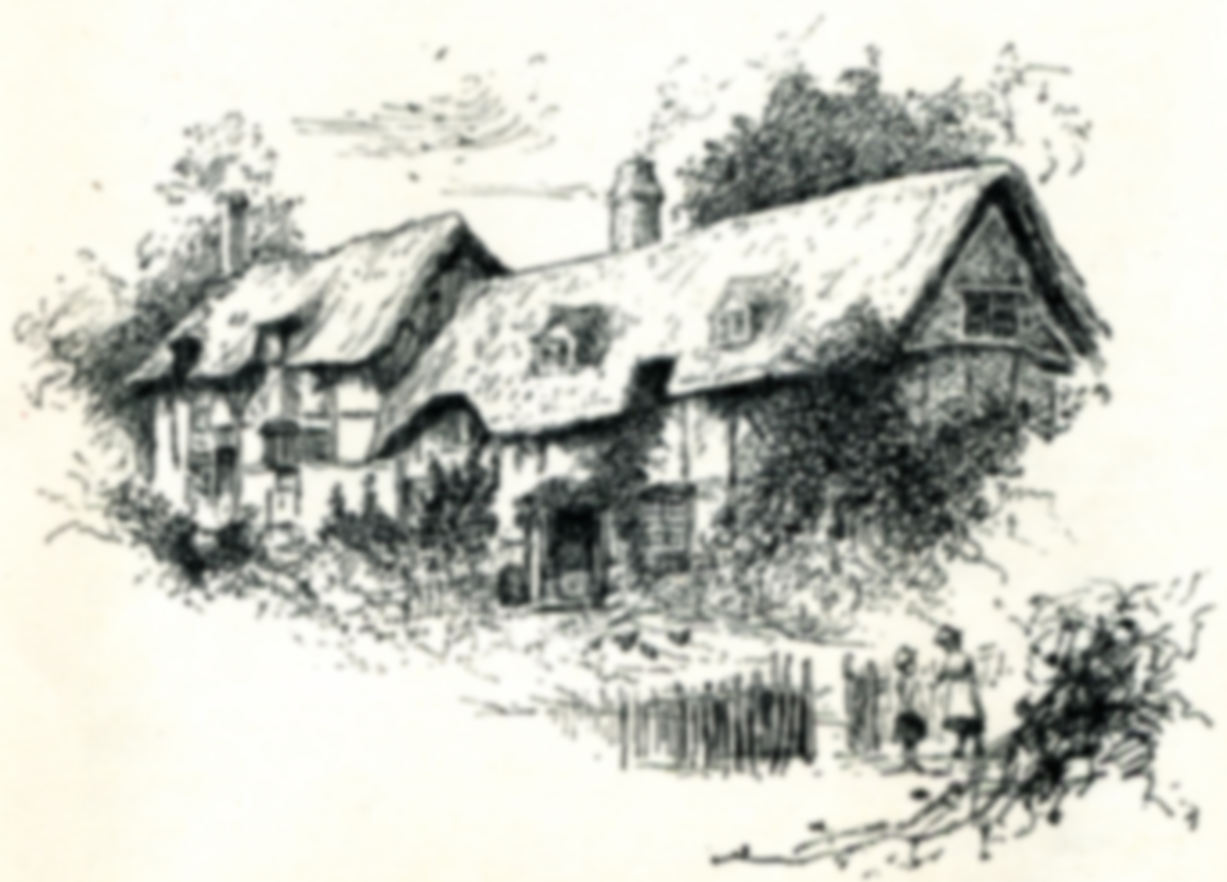
A Souvenir of the "Wanderer" Caravan, Book Illustration

- Medical Life in the Navy (1868)
- The Domestic Cat (1876)
- Cats: Their Points and Characteristics (1877)
- Wild Adventures in Wild Places (1881)
- Aileen Aroon (1884)
- On Special Service: A Tale of the Sea (1886)
- The Cruise of the Land Yacht "Wanderer" (1886)
- Exiles of Fortune: A Tale of a Far North Land (1890)
- Two Sailor Lads (1892)
- The Dog: From Puppyhood to Age (1893)
- Sable And White: The Autobiography of a Show Dog (1894)
- A Souvenir of the "Wanderer" Caravan (1895)
- To Greenland and the Pole (1895)
- For Life and Liberty (1896)
- Off to Klondyke (1898)
- 'Twixt School and College (1901)
- With Cutlass and Torch (1901)
- Every Inch a Sailor (1903)
- In the Great White Land: A Tale of the Antarctic Ocean (1903)
- Our Friend the Dog (1903)
- Westward with Columbus (1906)
- Young Peggy McQueen (1906)
- The Sauciest Boy in the Service: A Story of Pluck and Perseverance (1911)
