= Viscount of Oxfuird and Baronet of Makgill/Kemball =

Title in the Peerage of Scotland

Arms of the Viscount of Oxfuird, Chief of Clan Makgill.

Viscount of Oxfuird is a title in the Peerage of Scotland. It was created in 1651 for Sir James Makgill with the remainder to his "heirs male of tailzie and provision whomsoever". He had already been created a baronet, of Makgill, in the Baronetage of Nova Scotia on 19 July 1625, with remainder to heirs male whatsoever.

"The remainder to heirs male whatsoever" was a Scottish concept that permitted inheritance by persons not descended from the original grantee, but descended in the male line from male-line ancestors of the grantee.

However, on the death of the first Viscount's son, the second Viscount, the Lordship and Viscountcy were assumed wrongfully by his daughter Christian, as heir of tailzie and provision. Her son Robert Maitland Makgill also voted as Viscount of Oxfuird at the election of Scottish representative peer in 1733.

However, according to a decision by the Committee for Privileges of the House of Lords in 1977 the rightful heir to the Baronetcy, Lordship and Viscountcy was the second Viscount's kinsman David Makgill, the de jure third Viscount of Oxfuird (d. 1717). He was the eldest son of Sir James Makgill (d. 1661), grandson of Sir James Makgill (d. 1579), great-uncle of the first Viscount of Oxfuird. His son, the fourth Viscount, attempted to prove his claim, but was unsuccessful. Thereafter, the matter was generally left alone.

However, according to the decision by the Committee for Privileges, the rightful descent of the titles was to have been as follows. On the death of the fourth Viscount the claim passed to his kinsman John Makgill, the de jure fifth Viscount. He was the grandson of Reverend John Makgill, third son of the aforementioned Sir James Makgill (d. 1661). His younger son George Makgill, the de jure seventh Viscount, fought in the Jacobite army of Bonnie Prince Charles, was attainted but later pardoned. His great-grandson John Makgill, the de jure tenth Viscount, resumed the claim to the Baronetcy, Lordship and Viscountcy. Shortly after his death in 1906 the matter was resolved in his favour in regard to the Baronetcy, but the Lordship and Viscountcy still remained dormant. Consequently, his son George Makgill, the de jure eleventh Viscount, did become the eleventh Baronet, of Makgill. He continued to petition for the revival of the lordship and viscountcy.

However, it was not until 1977, 51 years after his father's death that his son Sir Donald Makgill, 12th Baronet, of Makgill, had the claim admitted by the Committee for Privileges of the House of Lords and was issued with a writ of summons to the House of Lords as the twelfth Viscount of Oxfuird.

His nephew, the thirteenth Viscount, was a Deputy Speaker of the House of Lords and was until his death in 2003 one of the ninety elected hereditary peers that were allowed to remain in the House of Lords after the passing of the House of Lords Act 1999. He was succeeded by his eldest twin son. As of 2022 he is the present holder of the titles.

Holders of the title often style themselves, technically incorrectly, as 'Viscount Oxfuird', although the correct form 'Viscount of Oxfuird' is also used.

The title of the Viscountcy is pronounced "Oxfurd". The Viscounts' seat was the original Oxenfoord Castle in Midlothian, built by the MakGills in the 16th century.

The Viscount of Oxfuird is the hereditary Clan Chief of Clan Makgill.

== Viscounts of Oxfuird (1651) and Baronet of Makgill (1625) ==
- James Makgill, 1st Viscount of Oxfuird (d. 1663)
- Robert Makgill, 2nd Viscount of Oxfuird (1651–1706)

The following wrongfully denied their titles:

- David Makgill, de jure 3rd Viscount of Oxfuird (d. 1717)
- James Makgill, de jure 4th Viscount of Oxfuird (d. 1747)
- John Makgill, de jure 5th Viscount of Oxfuird (1676–1762)
- Arthur Makgill, de jure 6th Viscount of Oxfuird (1709–1777)
- George Makgill, de jure 7th Viscount of Oxfuird (1723–1797)
- John Makgill, de jure 8th Viscount of Oxfuird (c. 1790–1817)
- George Makgill, de jure 9th Viscount of Oxfuird (1812–1878)
- John Makgill, de jure 10th Viscount of Oxfuird (1836–1906)

The following was denied the viscountcy but acknowledged as baronet:

- George Makgill, de jure 11th Viscount of Oxfuird, 11th Baronet (1868–1926) (confirmed as 11th Baronet, of Makgill, in 1906)

The following were acknowledged as lord and viscount only in 1977

- (John) Donald Arthur Alexander Makgill, 12th Viscount of Oxfuird (1899–1986)
- George Hubbard Makgill, 13th Viscount of Oxfuird (1934–2003)
- Ian Alexander Arthur Makgill, 14th Viscount of Oxfuird (b. 1969)

The heir apparent is the present holder's son the Hon. Max George Samuel Makgill, Master of Oxfuird (b. 2012).
