= Nicholas Lowther, 2nd Viscount Ullswater =

British hereditary peer

The Right Honourable The Viscount Ullswater LVO PC
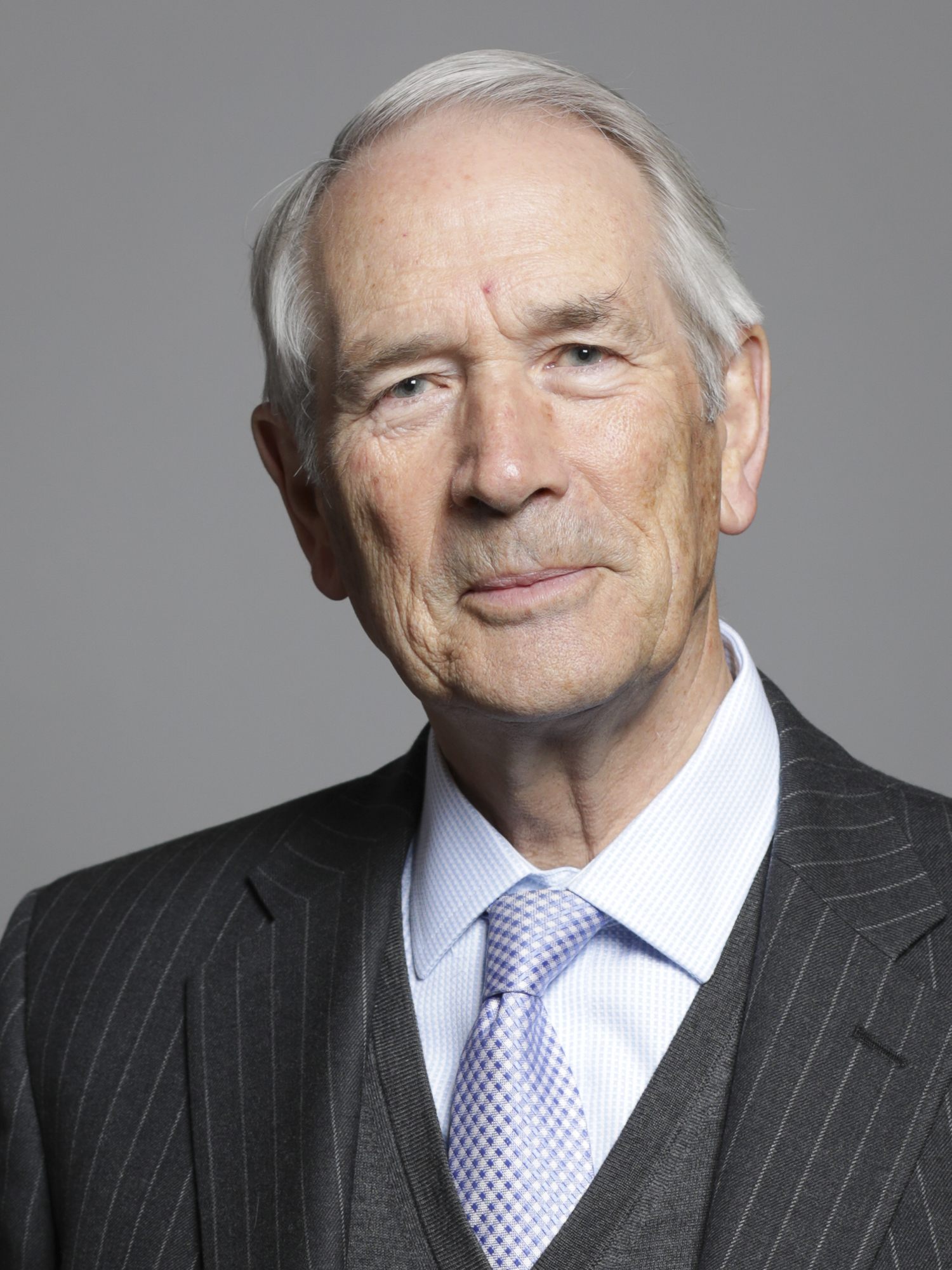
- Official portrait, 2019

Minister of State for Housing
- In office 20 July 1994 – 6 July 1995
- Prime Minister: John Major
- Preceded by: George Young
- Succeeded by: Robert Jones

Chief Whip of the House of Lords Captain of the Honourable Corps of Gentlemen-at-Arms
- In office 16 September 1993 – 20 July 1994
- Prime Minister: John Major
- Preceded by: The Lord Hesketh
- Succeeded by: The Lord Strathclyde

Parliamentary Under-Secretary of State for Employment
- In office 24 July 1990 – 16 September 1993
- Prime Minister: Margaret Thatcher; John Major
- Preceded by: The Lord Strathclyde
- Succeeded by: The Lord Henley

Lord-in-waiting Government Whip
- In office 26 July 1989 – 22 July 1990
- Prime Minister: Margaret Thatcher
- Preceded by: The Lord Henley
- Succeeded by: The Lord Reay

Member of the House of Lords
- Lord Temporal
- Hereditary peerage 19 July 1963 – 11 November 1999
- Preceded by: The 1st Viscount Ullswater
- Succeeded by: Seat abolished
- Elected Hereditary Peer; 28 March 2003 – 20 July 2022
- By-election: 2003
- Preceded by: The 13th Viscount of Oxfuird
- Succeeded by: The 4th Baron Roborough

Personal details
- Born: 9 January 1942 (age 84)
- Party: Conservative
- Education: Trinity College, Cambridge

Nicholas James Christopher Lowther, 2nd Viscount Ullswater (born 9 January 1942), is a British hereditary peer and former member of the House of Lords who sat as a Conservative. He succeeded his great-grandfather in the viscountcy of Ullswater in 1949, being one of very few peers to have succeeded a great-grandfather in a title.

He served as a whip and a minister under Margaret Thatcher and John Major between 1989 and 1995 culminating in serving as the Minister of State for Housing from 1994 to 1995.

== Early life ==
Lowther was the son of John Lowther (1910–1942) and Priscilla Lambert (1917–1945). His father was secretary to HRH The Duke of Kent, who served as best man at their 1937 wedding. His father died alongside the Duke in the Dunbeath air crash.

Lowther was educated at Eton College and Trinity College, Cambridge.

== Political career ==
Lowther was made a Lord-in-waiting (whip) in January 1989 by Margaret Thatcher before becoming Parliamentary Under Secretary of State at the Department of Employment in July 1990. He was retained by John Major in that role until 1993, when he became Captain of the Honourable Corps of Gentlemen at Arms (Government Chief Whip in the House of Lords). He remained in this role for a year. He became Minister of State for Housing at the Department of the Environment (as well as a Privy Counsellor) in 1994, but left the Government in a 1995 reshuffle.

== Princess Margaret ==
In 1998, he was appointed Private Secretary to Princess Margaret, Countess of Snowdon, and continued in this office until her death in 2002. He was appointed Lieutenant of the Royal Victorian Order in the special Honours List issued by the Queen after the Princess's death.

== Return to politics ==
As a member of a Royal Household he could not take part in partisan politics and did not seek to remain in the House of Lords when the House of Lords Act 1999 was passed. But after the death of the Viscount of Oxfuird in January 2003, he won the all-house by-election, enabling him to return to the House of Lords.

On 22 May 2006, Lord Ullswater was nominated for the newly created post of Lord Speaker, and in the election held on 28 June 2006 emerged in third place out of nine candidates. He served as one of the Deputy Speakers in the Lords until May 2020; from June 2020 until May 2021, he served as Deputy Chairman of Committees. His great-grandfather, James Lowther, served as Speaker of the House of Commons 1905–1921.

Ullswater retired from the House of Lords on 20 July 2022.

== Other interests ==
Lord Ullswater is the Chairman of Lonsdale Settled Estates Ltd and a Director of Lowther Trustees Limited, both companies that manage the family landholdings in Cumbria.

== Arms ==
Coat of arms of Nicholas Lowther, 2nd Viscount Ullswater
Crest A dragon passant Argent. Escutcheon Or six annulets three two and one and in chief a crescent for difference all Sable. Supporters On either side a horse Argent gorged with a wreath of laurel Vert and charged on the shoulder with a portcullis chained Or. Motto Magistratum Indicat Virum (The Office Shows The Man)

== Personal life ==
Lord Ullswater was an amateur jockey in his youth.

In 1967, he married Susan Weatherby. The couple has two sons and two daughters:

- Hon. Emma Mary Lowther, (born 1968)
- Hon. Clare Priscilla Lowther, (born 1970)
- Hon. Benjamin James Lowther (born 1975)
- Hon. Edward John Lowther (born 1981)

The family lives at Docking in Norfolk.

Political offices
Preceded by The Lord Hesketh	Chief Whip in the House of Lords; Captain of the Honourable Corps of Gentlemen-at-Arms; 1993–1994	Succeeded by The Lord Strathclyde
Party political offices
Preceded by The Lord Hesketh	Conservative Chief Whip in the House of Lords; 1993–1994	Succeeded by The Lord Strathclyde
Peerage of the United Kingdom
Preceded by James Lowther	Viscount Ullswater; 1949–present Member of the House of Lords (1963–1999)	Incumbent; Heir apparent: Hon. Benjamin Lowther
Parliament of the United Kingdom
Preceded by The Viscount of Oxfuird	Elected hereditary peer to the House of Lords under the House of Lords Act 1999; 2003–2022	Succeeded by The Lord Roborough
