= Clan Crichton =

Lowland Scottish clan

- Crest: A dragon spouting out fire, proper
- Motto: God send grace

Profile
- Region: Lowlands

Chief
- David Crichton of that Ilk
- Chief of clan Crichton, The Crichton of that Ilk
- Seat: Monzie Castle, Crieff
- Historic seat: Crichton Castle
Clan branches
Lord Crichton
Lord Crichton of Sanquhar
Crichton, Earl of Dumfries
Crichton of Frendraught
Rival clans
Clan Sempill
Clan Douglas

Clan Crichton is a Lowland Scottish clan that historically ruled Dumfries.

== History ==
=== Origins of the clan ===
One of the earliest baronies around Edinburgh was formed from the lands of Kreitton and is mentioned in charters of the early 12th century. In 1128 Thurstan de Crechtune witnessed the foundation of Holyrood Abbey by David I of Scotland. A presumed descendant, Thomas de Crichton, is listed on the Ragman Rolls of 1296, swearing fealty to Edward I of England. Thomas's three sons each extended the family's holdings. The second son, William, married Isobel de Ross who was the heiress to the barony of Sanquhar in Dumfriesshire.

=== 15th and 16th centuries ===
In 1464 Sir Robert Crichton of Sanquhar was sheriff of the county of Dumfries. From 1468 to 1469 he was also Coroner of Nithsdale. In 1487 his eldest son, Robert Crichton, was created a peer with the title Lord Crichton of Sanquhar by James III of Scotland.

Another descendant of Thomas de Crichton was Sir William Crichton who in 1439 was appointed to the office of Chancellor of Scotland, during the minority of James II of Scotland. Crichton organised the infamous "Black Dinner" at Edinburgh Castle of which he was constable. The Earl of Douglas and his brother were invited as guests of honour to a royal banquet at the castle, where King James was in residence. After the dinner the two Douglases were dragged from the boy king's presence and executed on Castle Hill. The Clan Douglas, never slow to take revenge, laid siege to the castle, which Crichton surrendered to the king, and a truce was declared. The Douglases would go on to make an unsuccessful attempt to assassinate Crichton, who was later given the title Lord Crichton.

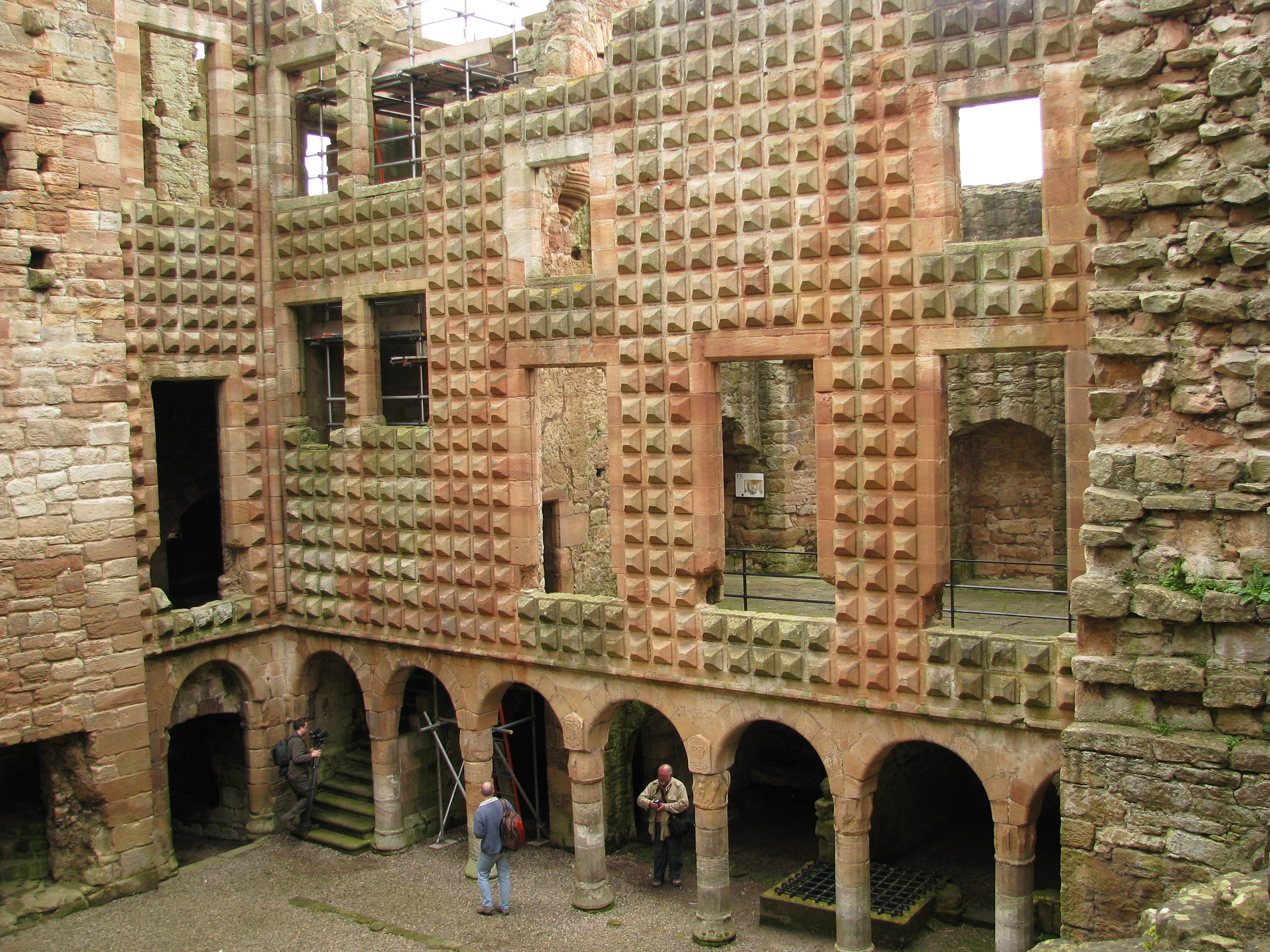
The interior of Crichton Castle, historic seat of the chiefs of Clan Crichton.

The second Lord Crichton obtained the barony of Frendraught in Banffshire through marriage. The third Lord Crichton sided with the Duke of Albany in his rebellion against his own brother, James III of Scotland. Crichton garrisoned Crichton Castle against the king, but the rebellion failed and as a result the Crichton estates were forfeited for treason.

In about 1552, William Crichton, third Lord Sanquhar, was killed in the house of the Regent Arran, by Lord Sempill (chief of Clan Sempill). The sixth Lord Sanquhar died in disgrace, having been accused of being involved in the murder of a fencing master who had blinded Crichton in one eye years before.

James Crichton is perhaps the most celebrated member of the Clan Crichton. He is known in history as "Admirable Crichton" due to his superb mental and physical prowess. He is said to have mastered all of the knowledge of his time and been able to speak and write in ten different languages, all by the age of twenty; he was also a feared swordsman. James Crichton studied at the University of St Andrews then travelled to Paris, where he challenged professors of the city to dispute with him on any branch of science or literature, offering to answer in any of his ten languages. The following day he was declared champion at a public joust. In 1582 Crichton was set upon by a gang, of which he killed five. Recognizing the sixth—the gang leader—as one of his own students, he dropped his guard, whereupon he was stabbed in the heart.

=== 17th century and Civil War ===
During the Civil War another James Crichton, 1st Viscount Frendraught supported the royalist James Graham, 1st Marquis of Montrose. Crichton was present at Montrose's defeat at the Battle of Carbisdale (also known as the Battle of Invercarron) in 1650. It is said that Crichton gave his horse to Montrose so that he could escape. Crichton was taken prisoner.

=== Modern history ===
The double-barrelled surname originates from the fact that the chiefs are direct descendants of the Maitland family, the Earls of Lauderdale, and Clan Makgill. Royal Navy Captain Frederick Maitland married Margaret Dick. Dick's grandmother was an heiress of Clan Makgill of Rankeilour and a descendant of James Crichton, 1st Viscount Frendraught of Clan Crichton through inter-marriage. One of their direct descendants Charles established his right to the chiefship and was recognised by a Lyon Court decree in 1980.

Members of the extended Maitland-Makgill-Crichton family include distinguished military officers, many of whom served in the various Scottish regiments during both World Wars, such as Major-General Edward Maitland-Makgill-Crichton and Brigadier Henry Maitland-Makgill-Crichton.

== Clan Chiefs ==
Incomplete list

- Charles Maitland-Makgill-Crichton (1942–1992)
- David Maitland-Makgill-Crichton (b. 1972)

== Clan castles ==
- Crichton Castle was the seat of the chief of Clan Crichton from the late 14th to 15th century.
- Sanquhar Castle was built by the Crichtons in the 13th century.
- Blackness Castle was built by the Crichtons in 1445.
- Monzie Castle is the residence of the current chief of Clan Crichton.
- Frendraught Castle was the home of the Crichtons of Frendraught between around 1460 and 1676.
- Crom Castle, near Newtownbutler in the south-east of County Fermanagh in Ulster, the northern province in Ireland. Crom is the seat of the 7th Earl of Erne, the head of the Irish branch of the Crichton dynasty.
- Crichton Chateau is the current residence of the self proclaimed chief of the American sector, Michael Crichton.

== See also ==
- Lord Crichton
- Earl of Dumfries
- Scottish clan
- Creighton (name), an alternative spelling of the surname
