= George Makgill, 13th Viscount of Oxfuird =

Scottish peer and Chief of Clan Makgill

The Right Honourable The Viscount of Oxfuird CBE

Member of the House of Lords
- Lord Temporal
- Hereditary peerage 16 April 1987 – 11 November 1999
- Preceded by: The 12th Viscount of Oxfuird
- Succeeded by: Seat abolished
- Elected Hereditary Peer; 11 November 1999 – 3 January 2003
- Election: 1999
- Preceded by: Seat established
- Succeeded by: The 2nd Viscount Ullswater

Personal details
- Born: George Hubbard Makgill; 7 January 1934
- Died: 3 January 2003 (aged 68)
- Party: Liberal; Crossbench; Conservative
- Spouse(s): (1) Alison Jensen; (2) Venetia Steward
- Children: 5

George Hubbard Makgill, 13th Viscount of Oxfuird (7 January 1934 – 3 January 2003), was a Scottish peer and Chief of Clan Makgill. He inherited his titles from his uncle.

Oxfuird was a deputy speaker and deputy chair of committees in the House of Lords. He was one of the 92 hereditary peers who were elected in 1999 to continue as members of the Lords when most of the hereditary peers lost their seats.

== Early life ==
George Hubbard Makgill was born in Winchester on 7 January 1934. His father was a Royal Air Force officer, and the family emigrated to New Zealand. His father was killed in a crash while flying between the North and South islands.

Makgill was raised in Wellington, and he attended St Peter's College, Cambridge, and Wanganui Collegiate School. After studying civil engineering at the Department of Civil Engineering, he returned to Britain and joined the Royal Air Force. He later became an engineering apprentice with Ford.

== Family ==
Lord Oxfuird married twice. His first wife, Alison Jensen, bore him four sons (including a set of twins), one of whom died two days after birth:

- Richard Makgill (born and died 1967)
- Ian Alexander Arthur Makgill, 14th Viscount of Oxfuird (born 1969)
- Hon. Robert Edward George Makgill (1969–2015)
- Hon. Hamish Max Alastair Makgill (born 1972)

Makgill and his second wife, Venetia Steward, had one son:

- Hon. Edward Anthony Donald Makgill (born 1983)

== Notes ==
Peerage of Scotland
Preceded by John Makgill	Viscount of Oxfuird; 1986–2003; Member of the House of Lords (1987–1999)	Succeeded by Ian Makgill
Parliament of the United Kingdom
New office created by the House of Lords Act 1999	Elected hereditary peer to the House of Lords under the House of Lords Act 1999; 1999–2003	Succeeded by The Viscount Ullswater
