= Sir George Makgill =

Scottish novelist (1868-1926)

Sir George Makgill, 11th Baronet, de jure 11th Viscount of Oxfuird (24 December 1868 – 16 October 1926) was a Scottish peer, novelist and right-wing propagandist.

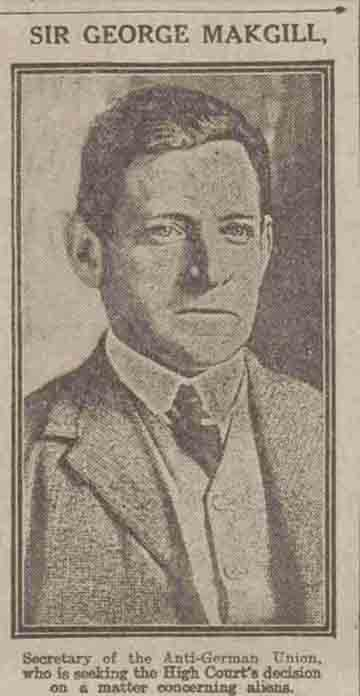
Rare photo of Sir George Makgill

== Biography ==
George Makgill was born in Stirling, the son of Captain Sir John Makgill 10th baronet, and Margaret Isabella Haldane, sister of Lord Haldane. He was the grandson of George Makgill, 9th Baronet.

Educated privately, Makgill lived for several years in New Zealand where his father had a station at Waiuku. In 1891 he married Frances Elizabeth Grant of Merchiston, Otago. After his father died in 1906, Makgill established his claim to the Baronetcy of Makgill, and continued to petition for the revival of the Lordship and Viscountcy of Oxfuird. As Sir George Makgill, he settled in Eye, Suffolk, leasing Yaxley Hall, an Elizabethan mansion, from Lord Henniker.

During the First World War Makgill was Secretary to the Anti-German Union, later renamed the British Empire Union. In 1915 and 1916, he brought a lawsuit to strip the German-born banker Ernest Cassel and American-born of German parents railway financier Edgar Speyer of their Privy Council membership; the case was dismissed, but Edgar Speyer's British citizenship was stripped after the war. After the war, business interests invited him to set up a private intelligence network, the Industrial Intelligence Board, to monitor communists, trade unionists and industrial unrest. The IIB's agents included Maxwell Knight and John Baker White, who later characterized Makgill as "perhaps the greatest Intelligence officer produced in this century".

In 1920, he announced himself as a People's League parliamentary candidate for East Leyton and, in 1921, as an Anti-Waste League candidate. He became General Secretary of the Empire Producers' Organization. He was also a member of the Anti-Socialist Union and was for a time part of a tendency within that group that was close to the British Fascists.

In 1926, he managed the day-to-day operations of the Organization for the Maintenance of Supplies, set up to supply and maintain blackleg workers during that year's general strike.

Makgill died in October 1926 in London, England.

== Family ==
He had two sons and two daughters; his eldest son John Donald Makgill (born 1899) inherited the baronetcy.

== Publications ==
Makgill's novels were often colonial adventure stories; he also wrote for Austin Harrison's English Review on the Anti-German Union (December 1915 and February 1916) and on imperial reconstruction (April 1917).

- (as Victor Waite) Cross Trails, 1898
- (as Mungo Ballas),Outside and overseas: being the history of Captain Mungo Ballas, styled of Ballasburn, in the shire of Fife; with some account of his voyages, adventures, and attempts to found a kingdom in the South Seas as told by his nephew and namesake, Mungo Ballas, last of the race and house of the name, 1903
- Blacklaw, 1914
- Felons, 1915
- (as Emerson C. Hambrook) The Red To-Morrow, 1920

Extant short stories include:

- Head of the Firm (1903)
