= Sir George Makgill, 9th Baronet =

Scottish peer

Sir George Makgill, 9th Baronet of Kemback and Fingask, de jure 9th Viscount of Oxfuird FRSE (1812-1878) was a Scottish peer.

== Life ==
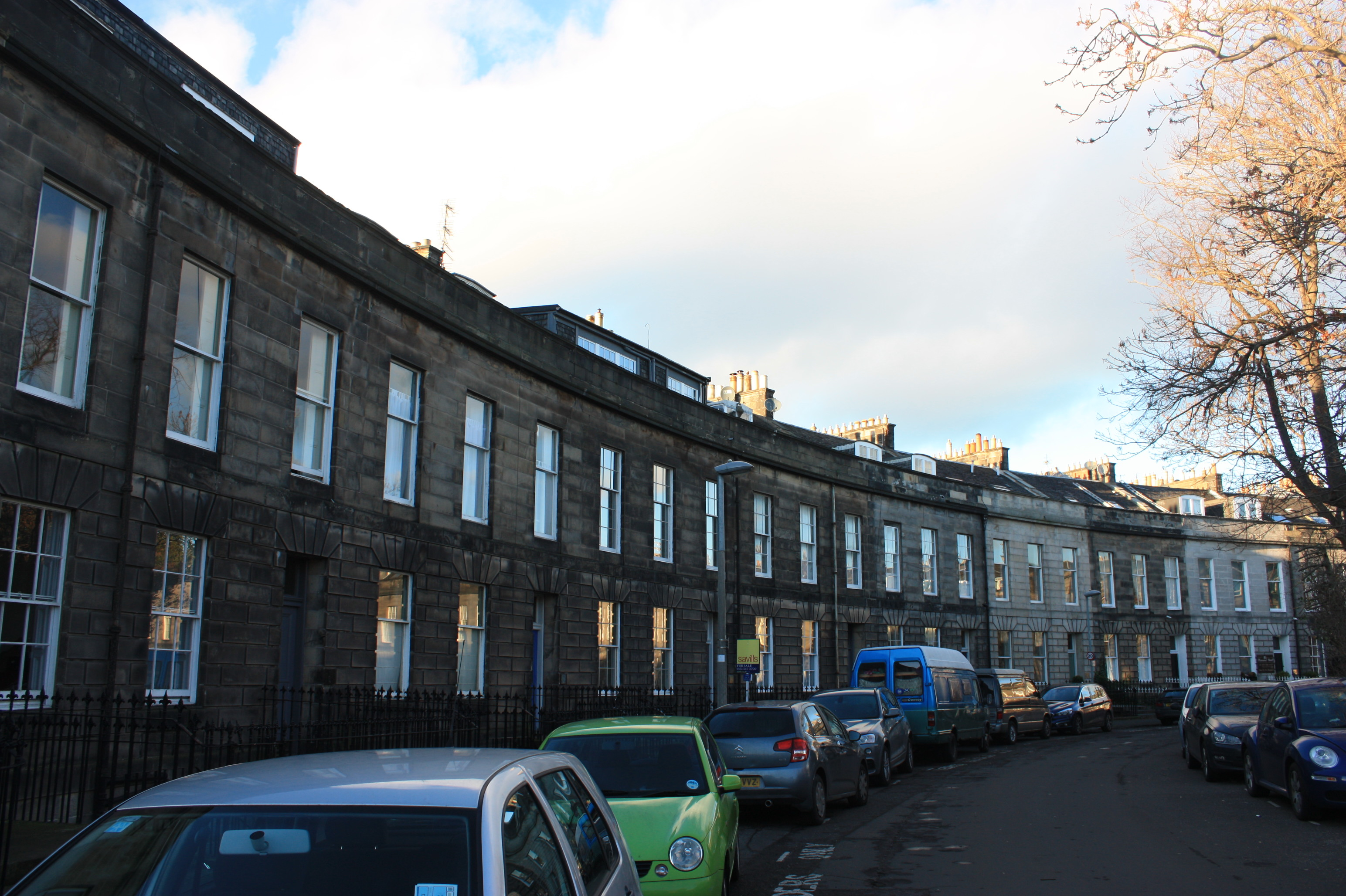
Claremont Crescent, Edinburgh

He was born on 23 December 1812 the son of John Makgill of Kemback and Fingask and his wife Eliza Dalgleish.

In 1847 he was elected a Fellow of the Royal Society of Edinburgh his proposer being Archibald Campbell Swinton. He resigned from the Society in 1857.

In the 1850s he had an Edinburgh townhouse at 12 Claremont Crescent in the New Town.

He died on 21 September 1878.

== Family ==
His sister Jane married Robert Haldane WS.

In 1833 he married Harriet Strettell (d.1890), daughter of Amos Strettell. They were parents to Captain John Makgill, George Makgill and Arthur Makgill, and grandparents to George Makgill.

== Publications ==
Makgill published Rent No Robbery: An Examination Of Some Erroneous Doctrines Regarding Property In Land in 1851. The short, roughly 40 page tract was a response to popular communist arguments against the practice of rent, such as those laid out in the Economic and Philosophic Manuscripts of Karl Marx from 1844.
