= Aberchirder =

Village in Aberdeenshire, Scotland

Coordinates: 57.55832°N 2.63004°W

Aberchirder: Scottish Gaelic: Obar Chiardair; Scots: Foggieloan/Aberchirder; Foggie
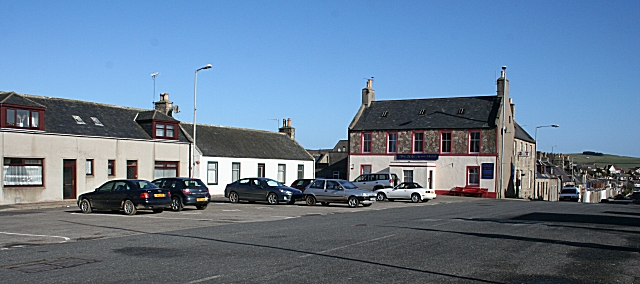

- Location within Aberdeenshire
- Population: 1,170 (2020)
- OS grid reference: NJ624522
- Council area: Aberdeenshire
- Lieutenancy area: Banffshire
- Country: Scotland
- Sovereign state: United Kingdom
- Post town: HUNTLY
- Postcode district: AB54
- Dialling code: 01466
- Police: Scotland
- Fire: Scottish
- Ambulance: Scottish
- UK Parliament: Aberdeenshire North and Moray East
- Scottish Parliament: Banffshire and Buchan Coast

Aberchirder (pronounced ‘Aberhirder’; Scots: Fogieloan, Scottish Gaelic: Obar Chiardair), known locally as Foggieloan or Foggie, is a village in Aberdeenshire, Scotland, situated on the A97 road six miles west of Turriff.

== Etymology ==
The name Aberchirder, recorded in c. 1204 as Aberkerdour means 'mouth of the Chirder'. It is formed from the Pictish word aber 'river mouth' and the stream-name Chirder which is itself formed from the Gaelic words ciar 'dark, brown' and dobhar 'water'. This stream name is probably an adaptation of an earlier Pictish name.

== History ==
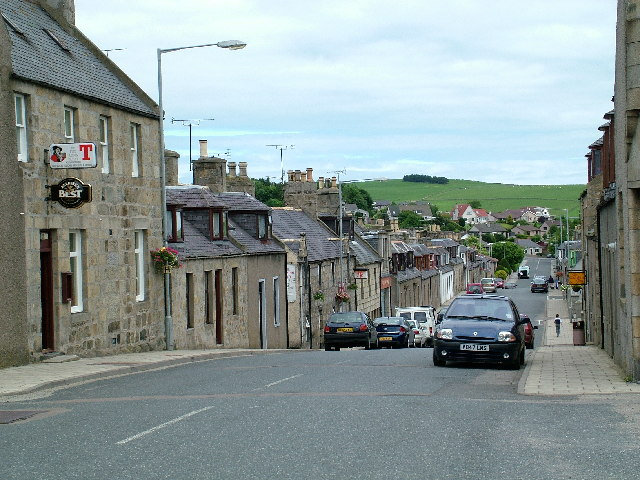
Main Street, Aberchirder

The village of Aberchirder was founded in 1764 by Alexander Gordon, the 5th Laird of Auchintoul. Until 1823 its official name was, in fact, Foggieloan after a small farm community on the site of which it was built. There is some uncertainty as to how the name Foggieloan originated. There are various theories; the most likely is that there is a stretch of moorland north of where the farm town existed (and, now, north of the village) which was named Foggieloan Moss from two Gaelic words foidh (peat moss) and lòn (meadow), so Foggieloan means peaty or boggy meadow. Kinnairdy Castle, now belonging to the Innes family is 2 miles to the south west, where the River Deveron joins the Auchintoul Burn. In 1823, the village is said to have been renamed 'Aberchirder' by the landowner, John Morison MP (later the 6th Baron of Bognie and Mountblairy), after the 13th century Thanes of Aberkerdour of Kinnairdy Castle.

As a planned community, the village was built on a grid pattern around a central square and had a mix of single storey thatched, stone-built houses fronting onto the streets (to prevent people having their middens on show) with long gardens intended to provide the inhabitants with a seasonal supply of food. Alexander Gordon envisaged a thriving industrial village and built a small linen factory in Back Street (now North Street) which produced fine linen table-cloths and wincey using flax from Auchintoul Moss. By the late 19th century, wealthier inhabitants had built some grander houses and there was a selection of religious establishments throughout the town catering to various denominations in addition to the Church of Scotland and Free Church (1840, James Matthews) buildings.

In 1960, the Royal Observer Corps opened a small monitoring bunker, to be used in the event of a nuclear attack. It was closed in 1991 and remains intact.

== Transport ==
The town is served by the 301 service between Huntly and Macduff, and the 303 between Huntly and Turriff. The town was formerly served by the 308 to Inverurie. This service was withdrawn in 2021.

== Notable people ==
- Des Bremner (born 1952), professional footballer
- Fred Bremner (1863–1941), photographer
- Irvin Duguid (born 1969), musician and composer
- William Gordon Stables (1840–1910), doctor and author
