= Clan Makgill =

Scottish clan

- Crest: A phoenix in flames Proper
- Motto: Sine Fine (Without end)

Profile
- Region: Lowland

Chief
- Ian Arthur Alexander Makgill
- 14th Viscount of Oxfuird

Clan Makgill is a Lowland Scottish clan.

== History ==
=== Origins of the clan ===
The historian George Fraser Black suggested in his work Surnames of Scotland that the surname Makgill is derived from Mac an ghoill which means son of the lowlander or son of the stranger. The name was established in Galloway before the thirteenth century. In 1231 Maurice Macgeil witnessed a charter of Maldouen, Earl of Lennox to the church of St Thomas the Martyr of Arbroath.

=== 16th and 17th centuries ===
During the reign of James V of Scotland, James Makgill, a descendant of the Galloway family was a prominent Edinburgh merchant and later became Provost of Edinburgh. He supported the reformed religion and the eldest of his two sons, Sir James Makgill, purchased the estate of Nether Rankeillour in Fife. James studied law at Edinburgh and was recognised as an able scholar. He became a member of the College of Justice in June 1554, and in August of the same year he became a Lord of Session. James Makgill bought the estate of Nether Rankeillour and took the judicial title "Lord Rankeillor". He became a friend and supporter of the religious reformer, John Knox. In 1561 when Mary, Queen of Scots returned to Scotland from widowhood in France, Makgill became one of her Privy Councillors. However he was also heavily implicated in the murder of the queen's secretary David Rizzio and as a result was deprived of his judicial rank and was forced to flee from Edinburgh. He was later pardoned but was ordered to stay north of the River Tay. In December 1567, through the influence of the Regent Moray, Makgill was restored to his offices. He later attended as one of the regent's commissioners who attended the regent on his journey to York to present accusations of the queen who was then in exile. He was also later an ambassador to the court of Elizabeth I of England in 1571 and 1572, however while he was absent his house in Edinburgh was attacked by supporters of Queen Mary and his wife was killed. He died in 1579 and was succeeded by his younger brother who held the lands of Cranston-Riddell and who had been appointed to the Court of Session in 1582. He took the title "Lord Cranston-Riddell" and was succeeded in 1594 by his son, David, who followed him onto the Bench.

He was succeeded by yet another David, the third Laird of Cranston-Riddell, who died in 1619 without male issue. His brother was James Makgill who in 1627 was created a Baronet of Nova Scotia. He was appointed a Lord of Session in 1629 and in 1651 was elevated to the peerage as Viscount of Oxfuird. He died in 1663 and was succeeded by his son, Robert Makgill, second Viscount Oxfuird.

=== 18th century and disputed chiefship ===
Robert Makgill, second Viscount Oxfuird had a son named Thomas who died in 1701, five years before his father, Robert and left no issue. William Maitland son of Christian Makgill, daughter of the second viscount then claimed the viscountcy but this was challenged in 1734 by James Makgill of Nether-Rankeillor who was sixth in descent from Lord Rankeillor. The House of Lords refused to accept the claim of either James Makgill or Christian Makgill's son, William Maitland. As a result, the title became dormant although Christian's younger sister, Henrietta, later assumed the title of Viscountess of Oxfuird but without establishing the legal right to the title and she died in 1758 without issue.

The Nether-Rankeillor estates later passed through an heiress to Frederick Maitland, sixth son of the Earl of Lauderdale. The family then assumed the surname Maitland Makgill. Later David Maitland Makgill became heir to the Crichton viscountcy of Frendraught and styled himself Maitland Makgill Crichton. It was a member of this family who established the right to the chiefship of the Clan Crichton in 1980 and abandoned his additional surnames as required by the Lord Lyon King of Arms. In 1986 his kinsman, George Hubbard Makgill was recognised as the thirteenth Viscount of Oxfuird and chief of Clan Makgill.

== Clan chief ==
The current Chief of Clan Makgill is Ian Arthur Alexander Makgill, 14th Viscount of Oxfuird.

== See also ==
- Viscount of Oxfuird
- Scottish clan
