= James Crichton, 1st Viscount Frendraught =

James Crichton 1st Viscount Frendraught
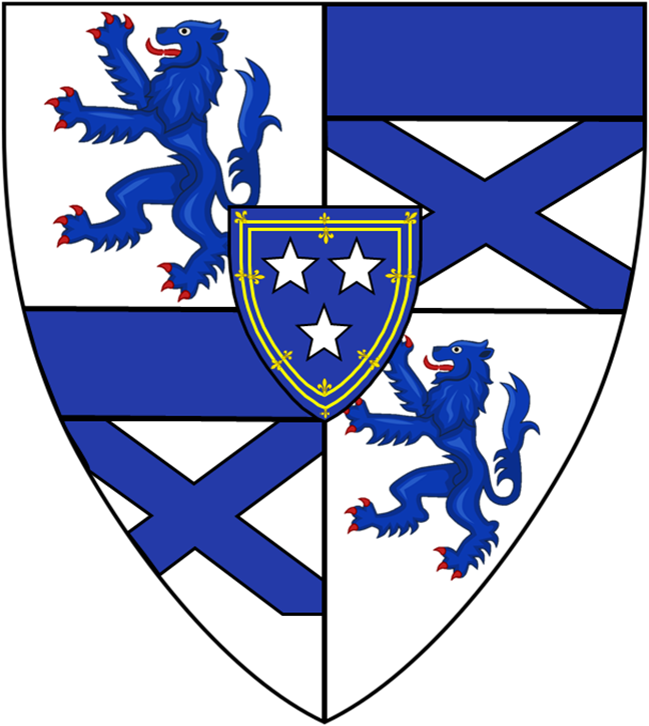
- Born: c. 1620
- Died: 1663
- Title: Viscount
- Successor: James Crichton, 2nd Viscount Frendraught
- Spouse: Margaret Leslie; Marion Irvine
- Parents: Sir James Crichton of Frendraught (father); Lady Elizabeth Gordon (mother)

James Crichton, 1st Viscount Frendraught (born c. 1620, died 1663) was a Scottish peer.

== Life ==
He was the eldest son of James Crichton of Frendraught, by Elizabeth Gordon, eldest daughter of John Gordon, 13th Earl of Sutherland. He was descended from William Crichton, 1st Lord Crichton. His father was of very turbulent disposition, and in October 1630 several friends whom he had invited to stay in the tower at Frendraught Castle to protect him from the threatened assault of his enemies were burnt to death there under circumstances that threw suspicion on himself. His chief enemies were the Gordons of Rothiemay, who repeatedly plundered Frendraught.

The son, James Crichton, was created Baron of Frendraught in 1641 and Viscount Frendraught in 1642. He married firstly Margaret Leslie, and secondly Marion Irvine. He took part in the last expedition of James Graham, Marquis of Montrose, and was present at the Battle of Carbisdale (1650). In the rout Montrose's horse was disabled, and Frendraught gave him his own, which enabled him to make good his escape for a time.

Some sources state that Frendraught died some time between 14 July 1664 and 17 August 1665 by his own hand on the field of battle. Others state that Frendraught died in the autumn of 1663 after having failed to secure aid from King Charles II. He was succeeded by his son by his second marriage, also named James.
