= Frendraught Castle =

Mansion in Aberdeenshire, Scotland

Coordinates: 57.4651°N 2.6335°W

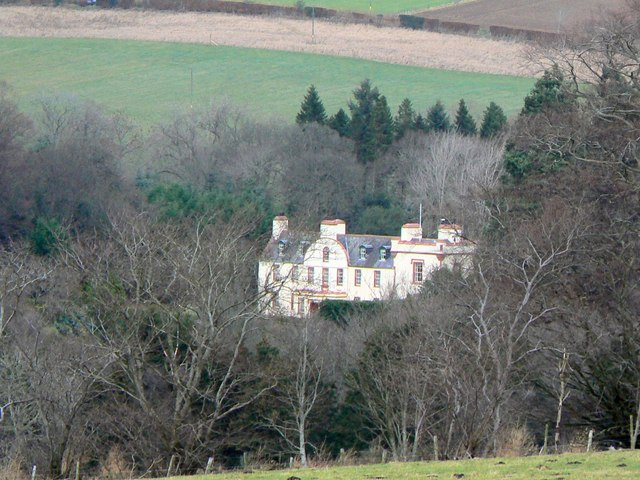
Frendraught House

Frendraught Castle or House is a 17th-century house, about 6 miles (9.7 km) east of Huntly, Aberdeenshire, Scotland, and 1 mile (1.6 km) west of Largue, on the site of a 13th-century castle.

== History ==
King James V of Scotland visited Frendraught for a week in November 1535.

The original castle was burnt down in October 1630 during a time of violent feuding between the Crichtons and the Gordons. Amongst those killed during the blaze were John Gordon of Rothiemay, John Gordon (Viscount Melgum / Lord Aboyne), English Will, Colonel Ivat and two unnamed servants. James Crichton of Frendraught and most of his people escaped. James Crichton was charged with, but acquitted of, their murder; instead, one of his servants, John Meldrum, was executed. This event was celebrated in the ballad, "The Fire of Frendraught", ballad 196 in the Child Ballads. The Gordons gathered the 'ashes and brynt bones' of the victims and buried them at the Kirk of Gartly.

James' son, also called James Crichton, was created Viscount Frendraught in 1642. He fought against James Graham, 1st Marquess of Montrose at the Battle of Aberdeen, and with him in 1650 at the Battle of Carbisdale, where he was wounded and gave his horse to Montrose to allow his escape. While it is said that he was captured and died soon after, John Buchan says that he lived until 1664 or 1665, and that another story, that he committed suicide after the battle, although accepted by the Dictionary of National Biography, is without foundation.

The Crichtons held the property from around 1460 until 1676, when it passed through marriage to the Morisons of Bognie. Incorporating parts of the original castle, the present house was built in 1656, remodelled in 1753, and extended in the 1790s, 1840s and 1880s. The house, which was restored fully in the 1990s, is still occupied.

== Structure ==
The present structure has been described as an extended house of considerable complexity and charm. Cellars in the west wing probably belong to the original building, while two small chamfered windows in the west gable seem to be the oldest features. There are fragments of the adjacent tower, which was demolished in 1947, adhering to the east elevation.

The rebuilding in the 17th century consists of an imposing seven-window harled front with an ashlar-faced three window centre, which is topped by a semicircular pediment, slightly advanced. The porch, which had a 1688 datestone, was added when the angle tower was embellished with battlements and bartizans, probably during the 1880s. There are crow-stepped offices to the north of the court, which have now been converted; this structure dates from the 18th century or earlier.

== Tradition ==
The ghost of Lady Elizabeth Gordon, who died long after the events of the 1630 fire (but may have been involved in the burning), is said to haunt the building and grounds. Sightings were reported during the 20th century.

- Castles in Great Britain and Ireland
- List of castles in Scotland

== See also ==
- Bognie Castle
- Baron of Bognie
- Viscount Frendraught
- Viscount Melgum
