= William Crichton, 1st Lord Crichton =

Lord Chancellor of Scotland (died 1454)

William Crichton, 1st Lord Crichton (died 1454) was an important political figure in the late medieval Kingdom of Scotland.

== Life ==
The son of Sir John Crichton of Crichton, William Crichton is first attested to as one of the Scots noblemen and gentry who were given safe passage into England to meet James I of Scotland, following the latter's release from captivity.

Crichton was one of eighteen gentlemen to receive the honour of knighthood at the coronation of King James on 21 May 1424, and was later made a Gentleman of the Bedchamber (Cambellano).

In 1426, Crichton, described as a knight and chamberlain (Dominus Willielmus de Chrichton miles cambellanus noster), along with William Fowlis, the royal almoner, and Thomas de Cranston, King's squire, were sent as envoys to the court of Eric III of Norway to negotiate a continuation of the peace between their respective countries. Upon his return he was appointed governor of Edinburgh Castle, Master of the Royal Household and by 1435 Sheriff of Edinburgh.

In 1437 Crichton, as Keeper of Edinburgh, had control of the six-year-old James II and by 1439 had himself proclaimed Lord Chancellor of Scotland.

During the King's minority, Archibald Douglas, 5th Earl of Douglas was Regent. On 24 November 1440, after Archibald's death, Crichton and Sir Alexander Livingston invited the 16-year-old William Douglas, 6th Earl of Douglas and his brother to dinner in Edinburgh Castle, and murdered them, despite the young King's pleas for their lives. This brutal incident of murder and betrayal of hospitality has become known as the "Black Dinner" and was an inspiration for the "Red Wedding" massacre in the Game of Thrones series.

Crichton was sent in 1448 to the continent, accompanied by the Secretary of State, John de Ralston Bishop of Dunkeld and Nicholas Otterburn who would latterly assume that position. The purpose of this embassy was not only to ratify the Auld Alliance between Scotland and France but to find a bride for the as yet unmarried King James. Crichton and his company proceeded on to the Duchy of Burgundy, where they negotiated with Duke Philip for a suitable match for the King. Mary of Guelders, daughter of Arnold, Duke of Guelders, and niece of Duke Philip was chosen. Crichton escorted the future Queen back to Scotland, where they landed at Leith on 18 June 1449.

In 1449 he founded a collegiate church on his estate at Crichton.

In 1450 he made a considerable loan to James II. He also invested his wealth in Crichton Castle, adding to it and transforming it into an impressive courtyard castle.

William, 1st Lord Crichton died before July 1454.

== Marriage and issue ==
Lord Crichton had, by his wife Agnes (Maitland?), three children:

- Sir James Crichton of Frendraught, who succeeded his father as 2nd Lord Crichton;
- Elizabeth Crichton, married Alexander Gordon, 1st Earl of Huntly;
- Agnes Crichton, married Alexander Lyon, 2nd Lord Glamis.

== Crichton in fiction ==
Crichton is portrayed as the villain of the story in Black Douglas, a 1968 novel by Nigel Tranter. He also features throughout The Lion's Whelp, a 1997 novel by the same author.

In addition, Crichton has a role in the 1899 novel The Black Douglas by Samuel Rutherford Crockett.

Peerage of Scotland
New creation	Lord Crichton; 1443–1454	Succeeded by James Crichton
