= List of churches in Na h-Eileanan Siar =

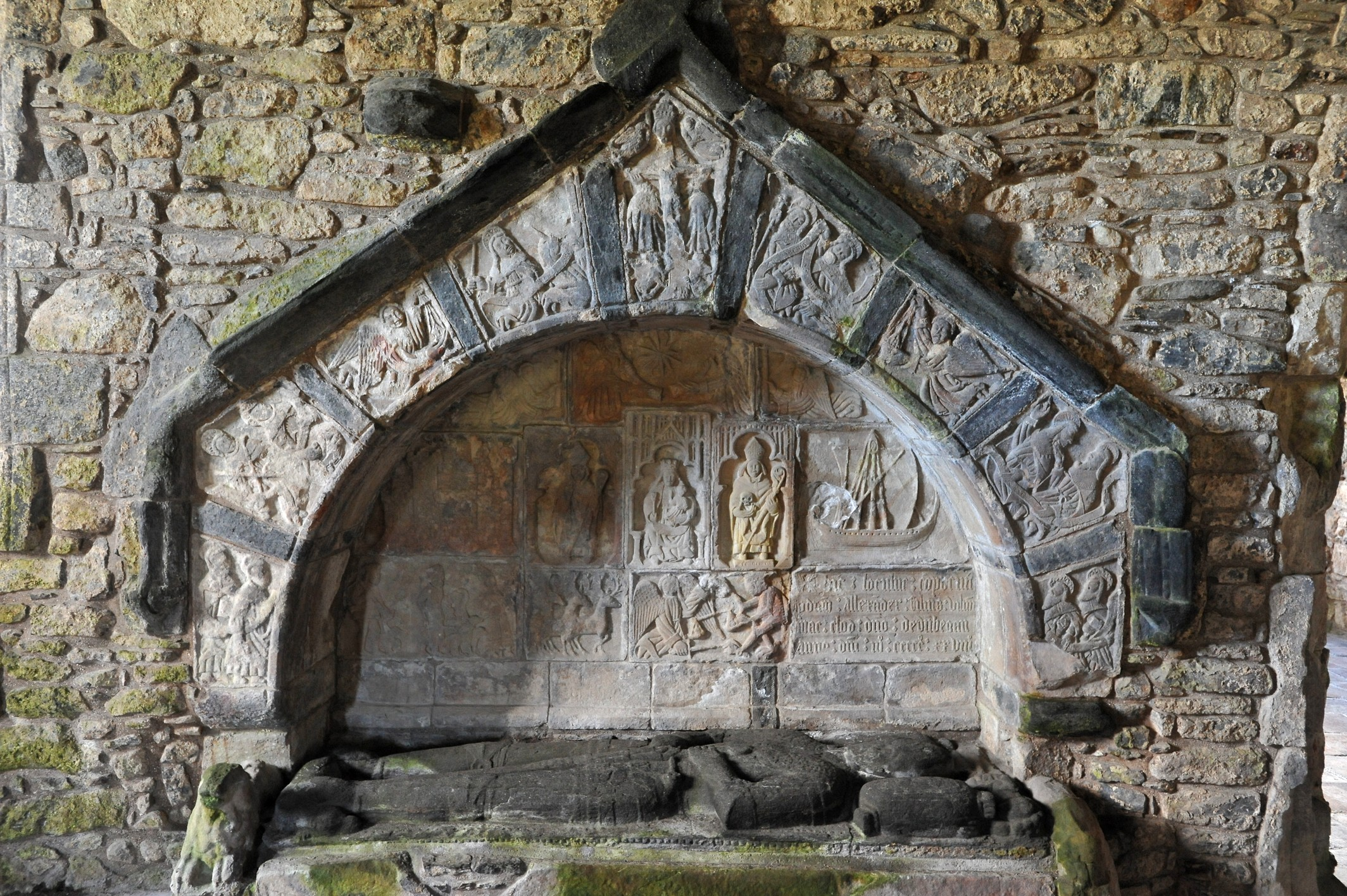
Alasdair Crotach MacLeod's wall tomb, St Clement's Church, Rodel

This is a list of churches in the Outer Hebrides of Scotland. These islands are also officially known as Na h-Eileanan Siar since the implementation of the Local Government (Gaelic Names) (Scotland) Act 1997.

Since the Reformation the residents of the northern islands (Lewis, Harris, North Uist) have been predominantly Presbyterian, and those of the southern islands (Benbecula, South Uist, Barra) predominantly Roman Catholic. At the time of the 2001 Census, 42% of the population identified themselves as being affiliated with the Church of Scotland, with 13% Roman Catholic and 28% with other Christian churches. Many of this last group belong to the Free Church of Scotland. There are also small Episcopalian congregations in Lewis and Harris.

The eight historic civil parishes of the area, by which this list is ordered, are: Barvas, Stornoway, Uig, Lochs, Harris, North Uist, South Uist and Barra.

== Active churches ==
The council area has an estimated 92 active churches for 26,900 inhabitants, a ratio of one church to every 292 people. This is the lowest anywhere in Scotland or the United Kingdom, partially due to the remoteness of settlements and partly to the proliferation of denominations. An even lower ratio is found on the island of North Uist, where there are 10 churches for only 1,254 inhabitants.

Name	Image	Parish (settlement)	Web	Founded	Denomination	Notes
Barvas Parish Church		Barvas		Medieval?	Church of Scotland	Gaelic spoken. New building 1874 vacated 1924. Current building was previously United Free Church, built c. 1910
Cross Ness Church of Scotland		Barvas (Cross)		1828	Church of Scotland	Gaelic only. First CoS church planted from Barvas church 1828, closed 1905, demolished 1949. Current building 1909 was United Free Church, separated from Cross Free Church, rejoined CoS 1929.
Teampall Mholuaidh		Barvas (Eoropie)		Medieval	Episcopal Church	Dedicated to St Moluag
Barvas Free Church		Barvas (Borve)		1843	Free Church	Building 1850
Shawbost Free Church		Barvas (Shawbost)		1893	Free Church	Formed from Carloway Free Church
Cross Free Church		Barvas (Cross)		1843	Free Church	Worshipped in South Dell building from 1846. Current building 1892
Shawbost Free Church (Continuing)		Barvas (Shawbost)			Free Church (Cont)	
Ness Free Church (Continuing)		Barvas (North Dell)		2000	Free Church (Cont)	Building 2003-2004
Ness Free Presbyterian Church		Barvas (Ness)			Free Presbyterian	
Lochs-Crossbost Parish Church		Lochs (Liurbost)		1724	Church of Scotland	Gaelic spoken. Rebuilt 1796. Whole congregation left to found Crossbost Free Church in 1843
Kinloch Parish Church		Lochs (Kinloch)			Church of Scotland	Gaelic only
Lochs-Crossbost Free Church		Lochs (Crossbost)		1843	Free Church	
Pairc Free Church		Lochs (Gravir)		1879	Free Church	Building 1882
Kinloch Free Church		Lochs (Laxay)		1885	Free Church	
Uig Parish Church		Uig (Miavaig)			Church of Scotland	Gaelic only. Linked with Lochs-in-Bernera
Carloway Parish Church		Uig (Carloway)			Church of Scotland	Gaelic spoken. Building 1908
Lochs-in-Bernera Parish Church		Uig (Breaclete)		1880	Church of Scotland	Gaelic spoken. On island of Great Bernera. Linked with Uig
Callanish Free Church		Uig (Callanish)			Free Church	
Carloway Free Church		Uig (Carloway)		1844	Free Church	Building 1884
Uig Free Presbyterian Church		Uig (Miavaig)		1929	Free Presbyterian	
St Columba's Parish Church, Stornoway		Stornoway		1794	Church of Scotland	Gaelic spoken. Dedicated to St Columba
Martin's Memorial Church, Stornoway		Stornoway		1876-78	Church of Scotland	Formerly a Free Church and United Free Church (the United Free English). Named after first minister, Donald Martin
Stornoway High Church of Scotland		Stornoway		1909	Church of Scotland	Gaelic spoken. United Free Church until 1929. The continuing members of Stornoway High Church in 2013 (see below)
Knock Parish Church		Stornoway (Garrabost)			Church of Scotland	Gaelic only
St Peter's, Stornoway		Stornoway		1838	Episcopal Church	Dedicated to St Peter. Previously an Episcopal church in the town from 1630 to 1660
Our Holy Redeemer, Stornoway		Stornoway		1961	Roman Catholic	Building 1990
Stornoway Free Church		Stornoway		1844	Free Church	Founded as the Gaelic Free Church, Stornoway. Building 1845, rebuilt 1850
Free Church Seminary		Stornoway		1858	Free Church	Services held. Rebuilt 1900
High Free Church, Stornoway		Stornoway		2013	Free Church	Split from High Church of Scotland 2013 over admission of gay clergy
Knock Free Church		Stornoway (Garrabost)		1843	Free Church	United with Point Free Church 2017
Point Free Church		Stornoway (Garrabost)			Free Church	United with Knock Free Church 2017
Back Free Church		Stornoway (Back)		c. 1859	Free Church	
North Tolsta Free Church		Stornoway (North Tolsta)			Free Church	
Tong Free Church		Stornoway (Tong)			Free Church	
Stornoway Free Church (Continuing)		Stornoway		2000	Free Church (Cont)	Building 2004
Knock & Point Free Church (Continuing)		Stornoway (Point)		2000	Free Church (Cont)	Building 2012
Stornoway Free Presbyterian Church		Stornoway		1895	Free Presbyterian	
North Tolsta Free Presbyterian Church		Stornoway (North Tolsta)			Free Presbyterian	
Stornoway Associated Presbyterian Church		Stornoway		1989	Associated Presbyterian	Building 1995
Stornoway Reformed Presbyterian Church		Stornoway			Reformed Presbyterian	
Stornoway Baptist Church		Stornoway			Independent	
Stornoway Brethren Meeting		Stornoway		1952	Brethren	
Stornoway Salvation Army		Stornoway		1983	Salvation Army	Building 1986
New Wine Church, Stornoway		Stornoway			New Wine	
Manish-Scarista Church of Scotland		Harris		1838-40	Church of Scotland	Maintains three buildings in Manish, Scarista and Leverburgh
Tarbert Parish Church		Harris (Tarbert)			Church of Scotland	Gaelic only
Berneray Parish Church		Harris (Berneray)		1887	Church of Scotland	Gaelic spoken. Linked with Lochmaddy. Built as United Free, joined Church of Scotland (nearby older CoS church now in ruins)
Christ Church, Isle of Harris		Harris (Grosecleit)			Episcopal Church	Dedicated to Jesus
Harris Catholic Meeting		Harris (Grosecleit)			Roman Catholic	Uses Christ Church Episcopal. Served from Stornoway
Harris Free Church		Harris (Leverburgh)		1843	Free Church	Minister joined United Free Church 1900, cause vacant 1900-1923
North Harris Free Church		Harris (Tarbert)		2014	Free Church	Split from Tarbert CoS 2014 over CoS admission of gay clergy
Scalpay Free Church		Harris (Scalpay)			Free Church	Meets in the local Church of Scotland building.
Harris Free Church (Continuing)		Harris (Northton)			Free Church (Cont)	
Scalpay Free Church (Continuing)		Harris (Scalpay)		2000	Free Church (Cont)	
South Harris Free Presbyterian Church		Harris (Leverburgh)			Free Presbyterian	
North Harris Free Presbyterian Church		Harris (Tarbert)			Free Presbyterian	Also meet in Stockinish, Harris
Scarista Associated Presbyterian Church		Harris (Scarista)			Associated Presbyterian	Meets in the Church of Scotland building
Lochmaddy Parish Church		North Uist (Lochmaddy)			Church of Scotland	Gaelic spoken. Linked with Berneray
Kilmuir & Paible Parish Church		North Uist (Kilmuir)		1892-94	Church of Scotland	Gaelic only. Originally North Uist Parish Church
Carinish Parish Church		North Uist (Clachan)		1889	Church of Scotland	Gaelic spoken. Linked with Benbecula. Worship was regularly held in the smaller church of Carinish until c. 2006. Previously Free Church then United Free until 1929
Sollas Parish Church		North Uist (Sollas)			Church of Scotland	
St Brendan the Navigator, North Uist		North Uist (Balmartin)			Episcopal Church	Dedicated to St Brendan
Chapel of the Holy Cross, North Uist		N Uist (Claddach Kirkibost)			Episcopal Church	Dedicated to the Holy Cross
North Uist Catholic Meeting		North Uist (Lochmaddy)			Roman Catholic	Monthly in Lochmaddy community hall. Served from Benbecula
N Uist, Grimsay & Berneray Free Church		North Uist (Carinish)			Free Church	
N Uist & Grimsay Free Church (Continuing)		North Uist (Knockintorran)		2000	Free Church (Cont)	
North Uist Free Presbyterian Church		North Uist (Sollas)		1893	Free Presbyterian	AKA Bayhead FPC
Benbecula Parish Church		South Uist (Griminish)		pre-C16th	Church of Scotland	Gaelic spoken. Linked with Carinish. Original building Teampull Chaluimchille. Church at Muir of Aird 1707. United with UFC 1929 and uses Free Church building, built in 1886
Daliburgh Parish Church		South Uist (Daliburgh)		1863	Church of Scotland	Gaelic spoken. Built as South Uist Free Church
Howmore Parish Church		South Uist (Howmore)		1858	Church of Scotland	Gaelic spoken. Remains of 13th century church nearby
Iochdar Parish Church		South Uist (Iochdar)		1889	Church of Scotland	
St Michael, Eriskay		South Uist (Eriskay)		1903	Roman Catholic	Dedicated to St Michael
St Mary, Benbecula		South Uist (Griminish)			Roman Catholic	Dedicated to St Mary
St Michael, Ardkenneth		South Uist (Ardkenneth)		1829	Roman Catholic	Dedicated to St Michael. Earlier medieval church nearby, which was parish church for northern South Uist and Benbecula, abandoned 1827
St Mary, Bornish		South Uist (Bornish)		1837	Roman Catholic	Dedicated to St Mary
St Peter, Daliburgh		South Uist (Daliburgh)		1868	Roman Catholic	Dedicated to St Peter
Our Lady of Sorrows, Garrynamonie		South Uist (Garrynamonie)		pre-1964	Roman Catholic	Served from Daliburgh. Dedicated to St Mary. Current building 1964-1965
St Bride, Gerinish		South Uist (Gerinish)		1966	Roman Catholic	Chapel of ease to Ardkenneth. Dedicated to St Brigid of Kildare
St Joseph, Howbeg		South Uist (Howbeg)		1902	Roman Catholic	Part of Bornish parish but served from Ardkenneth. Dedicated to St Joseph
South Uist & Benbecula Free Church		South Uist (Balivanich)			Free Church	Covers Benbecula and South Uist. Also meets in Lochboisdale on South Uist
Barra Parish Church		Barra (Cuithir)		1829-1834	Church of Scotland	Gaelic spoken. Congregation predates building. Previously worshipped in medieval St Barr's Church, Eoligarry.
Our Lady Star Of The Sea, Castlebay		Barra (Castlebay)		1888	Roman Catholic	Dedicated to St Mary
St Brendan, Craigston		Barra (Borve)		1805	Roman Catholic	Served from Castlebay. Dedicated to St Brendan. Rebuilt 1857. May be much older
St Vincent de Paul, Eoligarry		Barra (Eoligarry)		1964	Roman Catholic	Served from Castlebay. Dedicated to St Vincent de Paul
St Barr, Northbay		Barra (Bayherivagh)		1906	Roman Catholic	Served from Castlebay. Dedicated to St Barr
Our Lady of the Waves & St John, Vatersay		Barra (Vatersay)		1913	Roman Catholic	Served from Castlebay. Dedicated to SS Mary & John

== Defunct churches ==
Name	Image	Settlement	Web	Founded	Denomination	Notes
Baile na Cille Church		Uig		Medieval	Church of Scotland	Previous churches in the parish; church built 1724. Rebuilt 1828. Congregation and minister joined the Free Church 1843. United with Ceann Langabhat (previously United Free) in 1979. Closed 2002 and services held at the other Uig church (see above)
St Clement's Church		Harris (Rodel)		Medieval		No longer used for services (Historic Scotland). Dedicated to St Clement
Teampull na Trionaid		North Uist		Medieval		Ruined. Dedicated to the Trinity
Teampull Chaluimchille		South Uist (Balivanich)		Medieval		Ruined

== See also ==
- Religion in the Outer Hebrides
