= Fivepenny =

Coordinates: 58.500°N 6.248°W

Fivepenny: Scottish Gaelic: Na Còig Peighinnean
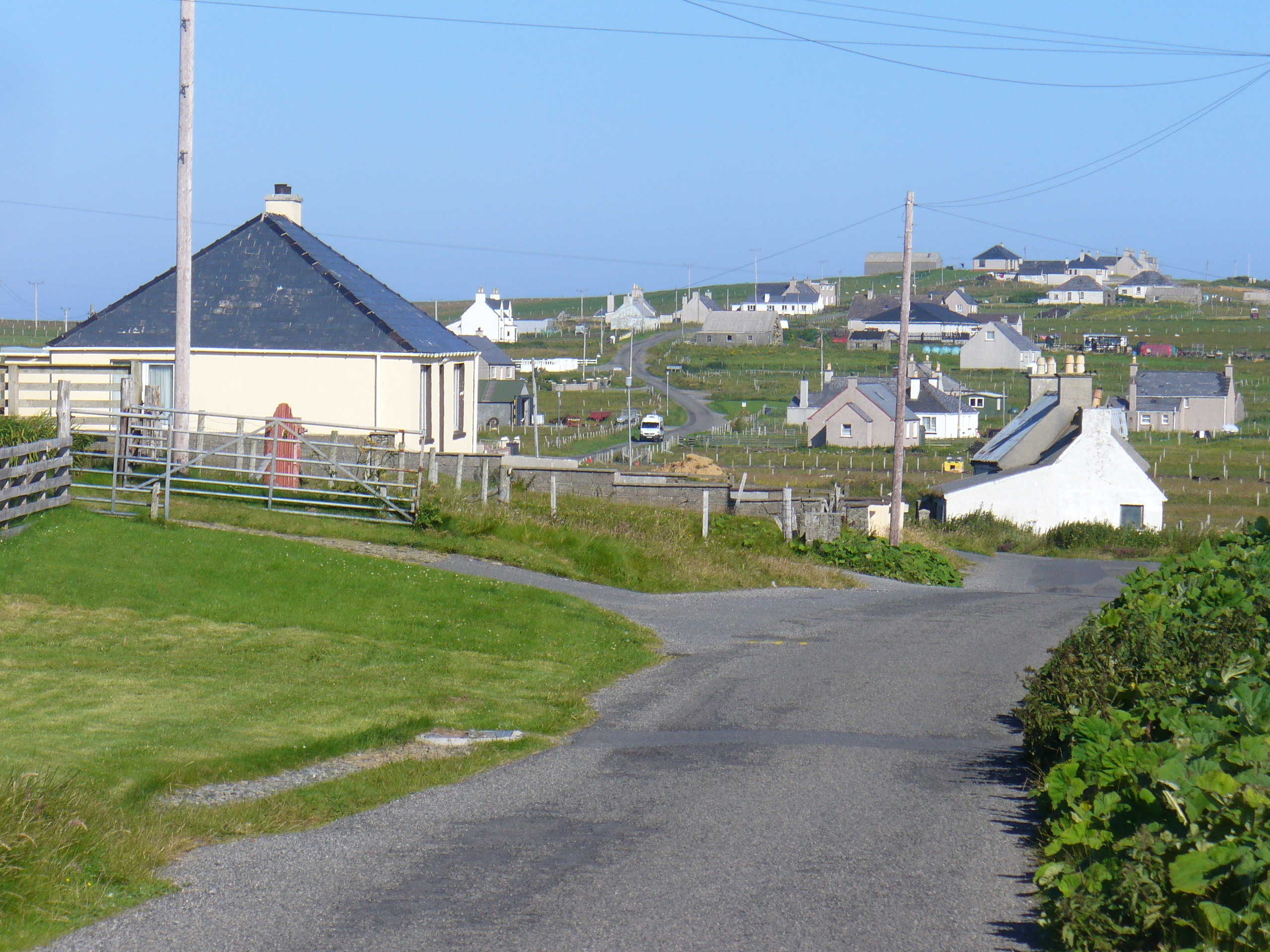
- The B8014, through Fivepenny

- Location within the Outer Hebrides
- Language: Scottish Gaelic; English
- OS grid reference: NB525646
- Civil parish: Barvas
- Council area: Na h-Eileanan Siar
- Lieutenancy area: Western Isles
- Country: Scotland
- Sovereign state: United Kingdom
- Post town: ISLE OF LEWIS
- Postcode district: HS2
- Dialling code: 01851
- Police: Scotland
- Fire: Scottish
- Ambulance: Scottish
- UK Parliament: Na h-Eileanan an Iar
- Scottish Parliament: Na h-Eileanan an Iar

Fivepenny (Scottish Gaelic: Na Còig Peighinnean) is one of the many villages in the Lewis district of Ness (Nis in Gaelic) and part of the Isle of Lewis, Outer Hebrides, Scotland. Fivepenny is within the parish of Barvas, and is situated on the B8014, between Port of Ness and Eoropie.

There are two separate places with this name, both in the north-west of Lewis. Furthest north in Ness the full name of the village there is Còig Peighinnean Nis, and in the Borve area further south of the village there is Còig Peighinnean Bhuirgh. Both are known locally as Na Còig Peighinnean, the full name only being used to distinguish one from the other.

== Name ==
The name refers to the fact that it is made up of five pennylands.

== See also ==
- Lewis and Harris
- History of the Outer Hebrides
