= Knockaird =

Coordinates: 58.498°N 6.238°W

Knockaird: Scottish Gaelic: An Cnoc Àrd
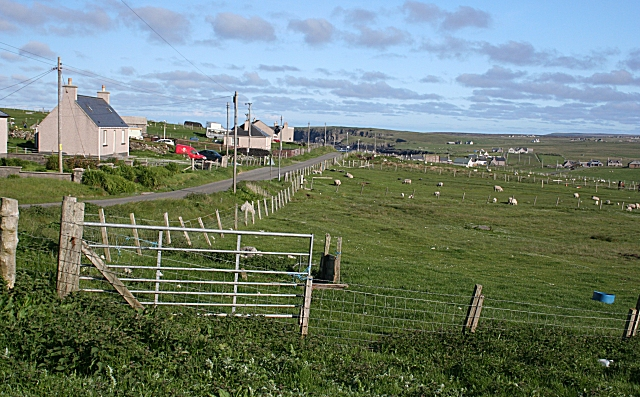
- Fields at Knockaird, alongside the B8014, looking in the direction of Port of Ness

- Location within the Outer Hebrides
- Language: Scottish Gaelic; English
- OS grid reference: NB531643
- Civil parish: Barvas
- Council area: Na h-Eileanan Siar
- Lieutenancy area: Western Isles
- Country: Scotland
- Sovereign state: United Kingdom
- Post town: ISLE OF LEWIS
- Postcode district: HS2
- Dialling code: 01851
- Police: Scotland
- Fire: Scottish
- Ambulance: Scottish
- UK Parliament: Na h-Eileanan an Iar
- Scottish Parliament: Na h-Eileanan an Iar

Knockaird (Scottish Gaelic: An Cnoc Àrd) is a village on the Isle of Lewis in the parish of Ness, in the Outer Hebrides, Scotland. It is the highest point in Port of Ness and is home to Dùn Èistean an ancient ruined fort on a small island that is joined by a bridge. Dùn Èistean is traditionally known as a stronghold of the Clan Morrison of Lewis. Knockaird is within the parish of Barvas. The B8014 travels through the settlement, between Port of Ness and Eoropie. The Clach Stein standing stones are situated between Knockaird and Port of Ness.
