= Aonghas Caimbeul =

Scottish poet

Aonghas Caimbeul (9 October 1903 – 28 January 1982), alias Am Puilean, was a Scottish Gaelic bard, war poet, and memoirist.

== Early life ==
Caimbeul was born on 9 October 1903 at Swainbost, Ness, Isle of Lewis, where his family had lived since being evicted from Uig in 1842, during the Highland Clearances. The island's Anglo-Scottish landlord had originally intended for the families of the evicted to emigrate, and only granted them land at Swainbost to avoid the threat of violence.

The poet's parents were Alexander Campbell from Habost (Alastair Mhurchaidh Òig, 1865–1948) and Christina "Christy" Maclean (Cairistìona Aonghais MhicillEathain, 1868–1930). Of the poet's nickname of Am Puilean, his son Donald John has said, "Many Ness nicknames have no meaning, as appears to be the case here."

Between 1909 and 1918, Aonghas attended the 300-pupil Cross School and later recalled, "A Lowlander, who had not a word of Gaelic, was the schoolmaster. I never had a Gaelic lesson in school, and the impression you got was that your language, people, and tradition had come from unruly, wild, and ignorant tribes and that if you wanted to make your way in the world you would be best to forget them completely. Short of the stories of the German Baron Münchhausen, I have never come across anything as dishonest, untruthful, and inaccurate as the history of Scotland as taught in those days."

In 1918, the poet's father became a missionary for the Free Church of Scotland and was assigned to Berneray, Isle of Harris. As the family journeyed to the new assignment, they travelled through Stornoway, which the poet thus saw for the first time.

Aonghas worked first as a cowherd at Bernery and then began working for the Stewarts of Ensay as a boatman and handyman on the islands in the Sound of Harris. In 1924, the poet began working as a crewmember on luxury yachts. In this job, he visited the French Riviera, which later fuelled his radical social views.

== India and Lewis ==
During the Interwar Period, Caimbeul enlisted in the Seaforth Highlanders using the anglicised form of his name, Angus Campbell, and served for seven years. He wrote his first poems while on a troop transport bound for British India. While there, Caimbeul served in combat against the Afridi Pashtun tribe during the Redshirt Rebellion in the Spīn Ghar mountains of modern Pakistan. During his service in India, Caimbeul managed to attend a speech made by independence activist Mohandas Karamchand Gandhi and an aerial show by aviator Amy Johnson.

In 1932, he returned to Swainbost and invested his earnings in a shop. In 1933, he married Mary Mackay of Eoropie (Màiri na Pòlag, 1909–1983). They had seven children, Donald John, Christine, Alasdair, Angus, Marion, Murdina, and Norman.

== War poet and POW ==
Caimbeul remained a member of the Territorial Army and, upon the outbreak of World War II in September 1939, he rejoined the Seaforth Highlanders and saw combat against the invading Wehrmacht during the Fall of France. After Major-General Victor Fortune surrendered the 51st (Highland) Division to Major-General Erwin Rommel at Saint-Valery-en-Caux on 12 June 1940, Caimbeul spent the rest of the war as a POW held at Stalag XX-A, near Thorn, in Occupied Poland. In accordance with the Third Geneva Convention, POWs like Caimbeul, who were below the rank of Sergeant, were required to work. For this reason, Caimbeul spent his captivity attached to Arbeitskommando ("labour units") and doing unpaid agricultural labour.

In his award-winning memoir Suathadh ri Iomadh Rubha, Caimbeul recalled the origins of his poem, Deargadan Phòland ("The Fleas of Poland"), "We called them the Freiceadan Dubh ('Black Watch'), and any man they didn't reduce to cursing and swearing deserved a place in the courts of the saints. I made a satirical poem about them at the time, but that didn't take the strength out of their frames or the sharpness out of their sting."

Caimbeul composed other poems during his captivity, including Smuaintean am Braighdeanas am Pòland, 1944 ("Thoughts on Bondage in Poland, 1944").

== Later life ==
After a three month long forced march from Thorn to Magdeburg and which he graphically describes in his memoirs, Caimbeul was liberated from German captivity on 11 April 1945. He returned to his native Swainbost and spent his life there until he died at Stornoway on 28 January 1982.

== Writings ==
Aonghas Caimbeul's collected poems, Moll is Cruithneachd, were published by Gairm at Glasgow in 1972 and were favourably reviewed.

Caimbeul's memoirs, Suathadh ri Iomadh Rubha, which won the £200 prize in a contest offered by the Gaelic Books Council, was edited for publication by Iain Moireach and was also published by Gairm at Glasgow in 1973. Of the memoir, Ronald Black has written, "It is a remarkable achievement consisting as it does of the memoirs of an exciting life, woven together with a forthright personal philosophy and much detailed ethnological commentary on tradition and change in island communities during the twentieth century, all steeped in a solution of anecdote, sometimes brilliantly funny. It is the twentieth century's leading work of Gaelic nonfictional prose."
