= Dùn Èistean =

Archaeological site in the Outer Hebrides, Scotland

Coordinates: 58.503275°N 6.23207°W

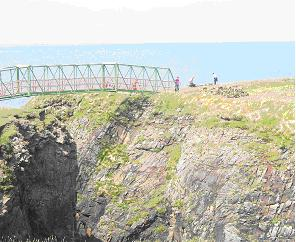
A view of the bridge connecting Dùn Èistean to the mainland

Dùn Èistean is a multi-period archaeological site on an inter-tidal sea stack on the north east coast of the Isle of Lewis, near the village of Knockaird (Cnoc Àrd, Nis) in the area of Nis (Ness) in the Western Isles of Scotland. It is accorded the status of traditional stronghold of Clan Morrison, once a highly powerful family within the Lordship of the Isles, in local oral tradition. The ruins of two large buildings and groups of interconnecting cellular structures can be seen amongst the grassy tussocks on the top of the island, as well as an artificial pond and a low turf wall enclosing the site. The most prominent feature of the site is a large circular mound of rubble situated on the highest point of the stack, on the north east side of the site. The topographical survey of the site shows these buildings.

The island would have provided all that was needed for occupation, having its own fresh water supply in the form of the artificial pond, and numerous buildings serving an array of purposes, from storage to sleeping quarters.

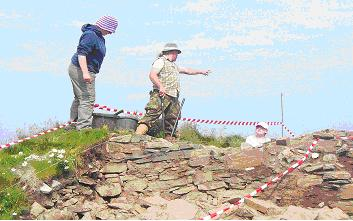
Archaeologists of the University of Glasgow excavating the tower

== Nordic history ==
Historically and archaeologically the Western Isles in the medieval period differed from mainland Scotland. The Western Isles were culturally Scandinavian and politically part of Norway from c AD 800 to c AD 1300. There are a variety of physically similar sites to Dùn Èistean around the coast of Lewis and the southern Western Isles, many of which have been occupied or used at the same time. There is also evidence from these sites of activity in the Iron Age or earlier prehistoric periods, and it is highly likely similar early evidence is awaiting discovery at Dùn Èistean below the later Dun and turf buildings.

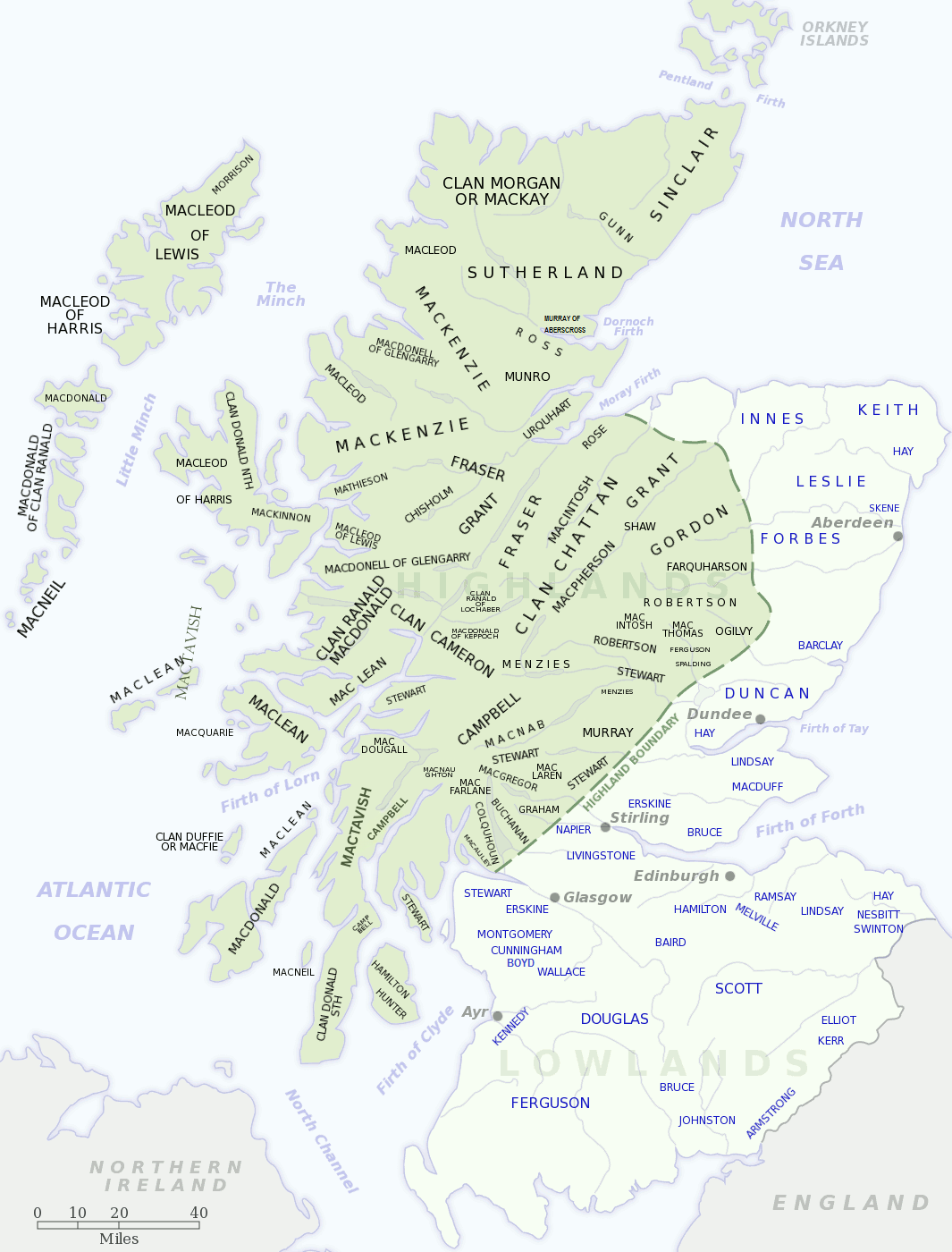
Clan map of Scotland

== Conflicts ==
With the demise of the Norse political control of the Western Isles in the 13th century, powerful clans emerged. The local traditions and stories relating to Dùn Èistean, and the Clans of Morrison, Macleod and Macaulay in particular, emerge from this volatile and often violent period in Lewis’ history. Morrisons of Harris and Lewis can traditionally be found from Barvas to the Port of Nis (Ness), and in the north-west Highlands in the county of Sutherland around the town of Durness (Scottish Gaelic: Diùranais), together with their traditional allies Clan Mackay. Their alternative names, or septs, include Morison, Gilmore and MacGilleMhoire in Scottish Gaelic.

Almost all structures and finds from this Clan Morrison island date to within the period between the 16th and the 18th centuries, which is significant given that the forfeiture of the Lordship of the Isles occurred in the late 15th century and that the intermittent clan wars and strife which followed the power vacuum created by the disappearance of the central power of the region (a period known in Gaelic as "Linn nan Creach" or the 'Era of Strife') and that the highlands and islands came under tighter government control with the destruction of the Clan system following the failed Jacobite Rebellions of the 18th century.

Dùn Èistean is now the focus of a multi-disciplinary project researching the history and archaeology of Ness under the auspices of the University of Glasgow Archaeological Research Division (GUARD).

In 2015, some of the earliest gun flints of the British Isles were found at the site.

== See also ==
- Clan Morrison
- Durness
- Gilhemoire
- Historic Scotland
- Isle of Lewis
- Lord of the Isles
- Norse–Gaels
- Scottish Gaelic
