= North Dell =

Coordinates: 58.472°N 6.295°W

North Dell: Scottish Gaelic: Dail bho Tuath
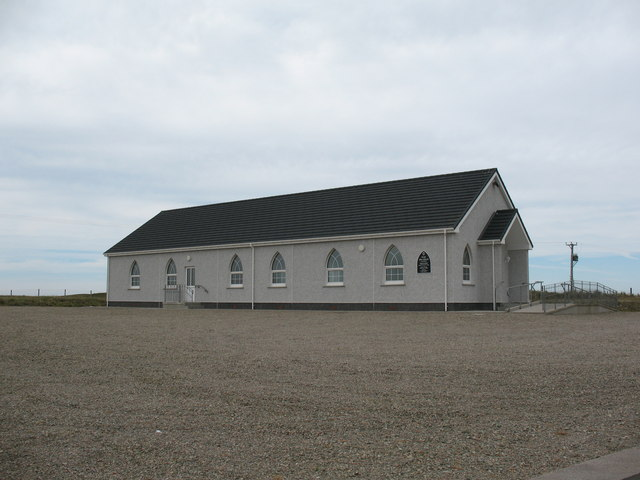
- The new church at North Dell

- Location within the Outer Hebrides
- Language: Scottish Gaelic; English
- OS grid reference: NB496617
- Civil parish: Barvas
- Council area: Na h-Eileanan Siar
- Lieutenancy area: Western Isles
- Country: Scotland
- Sovereign state: United Kingdom
- Post town: ISLE OF LEWIS
- Postcode district: HS2
- Dialling code: 01851
- Police: Scotland
- Fire: Scottish
- Ambulance: Scottish
- UK Parliament: Na h-Eileanan an Iar
- Scottish Parliament: Na h-Eileanan an Iar

North Dell (Scottish Gaelic: Dail bho Thuath) is a village on the Isle of Lewis in the community of Ness, in the Outer Hebrides, Scotland. North Dell is within the parish of Barvas. It lies 5 km south of the Butt of Lewis, between the settlements of South Dell and Cross and comprises 22 crofts. North Dell is reputed to be the best village for the growing of potatoes in Lewis – along with Garrabost in Point!

== History ==
In the 1820s due to illegal distilling Stewart MacKenzie of Seaforth, then owner of Lewis, decided to build a legal distillery. This was set up in North Dell in 1831. The Dell Enterprise was never very successful and by 1849 it was converted to a mill. The mill was closed for the duration of World War II. It reopened after the war ended and continued until 1970.

People who were cleared from Gress were settled here in the early 18th century. In 1874, the remaining tenants were moved from Gress to North Dell when the old Dell Farm became vacant.

Following the Education (Scotland) Act 1872, a new school was built in North Dell, the Cross School. It served the villages of South Dell, North Dell, Cross and half of Swainbost. It finally closed in 2011 with 13 pupils. The buildings are now owned by Comunn Eachdraidh Nis and is home to an historical archive, museum and a café.

== Landmarks ==
=== Comunn Eachdraidh Nis ===
Comunn Eachdraidh Nis was constituted in 1977 as the first Comunn Eachdraidh (Historical Society) in the Western Isles. It is now housed in the former Cross School. The centre is an accredited museum and hosts artwork, displays of artefacts, including the Ronan Cross, photographs, a community archive, sound and video recordings in Gaelic and English. The art collection is focused on local people and culture.

=== Dell Farm ===
The farm was originally set up as a distillery in the 19th century but was later extended to become the Dell Farm in the 1870s.

=== Ness Hall ===
Ness Hall, or The Murdo Macaulay Memorial Hall, was a popular venue for late-night dances from the mid 60s.

=== Teampall Chliamainc ===
There are historical records of Teampall Chliamain (St Clement's) church being located in North Dell. However, its exact location is unknown. Researched by the Ness Archaeological Landscape Survey has listed two possible locations.

== People ==
Alexander Morrison, HM Chief Inspector of Constabulary for Scotland
