= Cross, Lewis =

Coordinates: 58.473°N 6.285°W

Cross: Scottish Gaelic: Cros
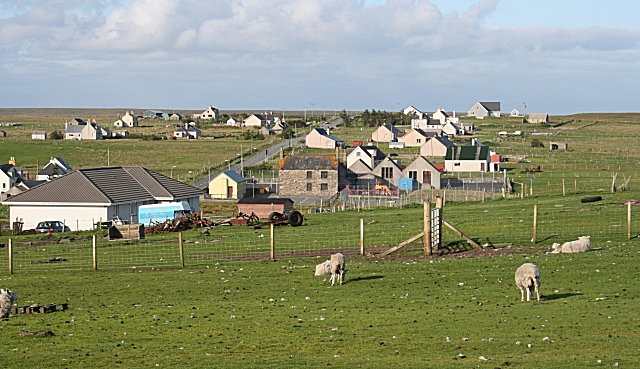
- A few steps from the back of the inn, looking south-westwards across the township of Cros

- Location within the Outer Hebrides
- Language: Scottish Gaelic; English
- OS grid reference: NB501617
- Civil parish: Barvas
- Council area: Na h-Eileanan Siar
- Lieutenancy area: Western Isles
- Country: Scotland
- Sovereign state: United Kingdom
- Post town: ISLE OF LEWIS
- Postcode district: HS2
- Dialling code: 01851 810
- Police: Scotland
- Fire: Scottish
- Ambulance: Scottish
- UK Parliament: Na h-Eileanan an Iar
- Scottish Parliament: Na h-Eileanan an Iar

Cross (Scottish Gaelic: Cros) is a township on the Isle of Lewis in the community of Ness, in the Outer Hebrides, Scotland. Cross is within the parish of Barvas. Cross is also situated on the A857, between Stornoway and Port of Ness.

Cross had a school, which closed in 2011 and is now the Community Museum. The settlement also has a food store, a hotel-inn, war memorial, two churches and Croileagan. Cross is home to around 100 people.
