= Sgoth =

Traditional type of boat of Scotland

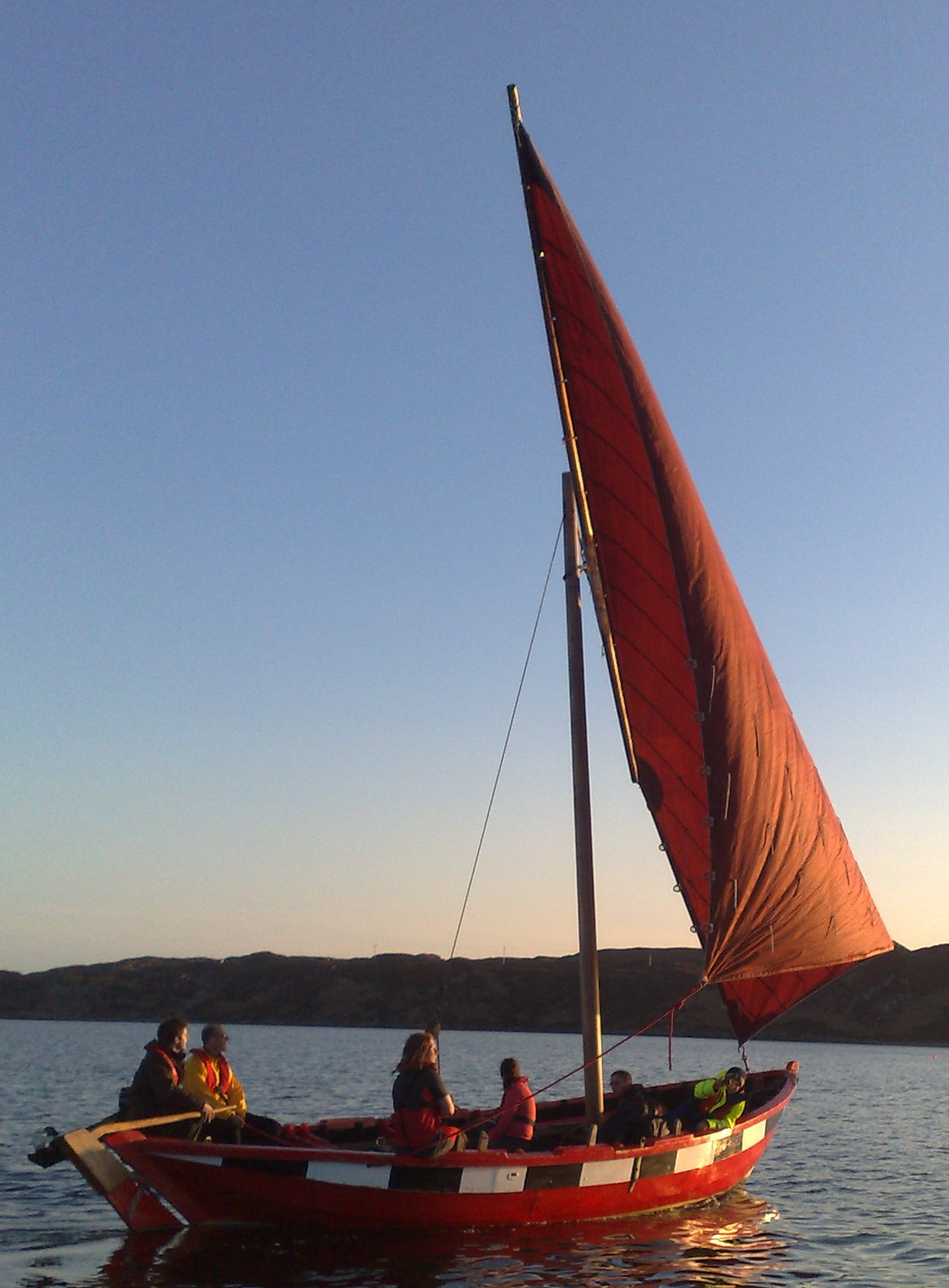
Jubilee under sail

A Sgoth or Sgoth Niseach is a traditional type of clinker built skiff with a dipping lug rig, built mainly in Ness, in the Western Isles of Scotland. The boats were traditional fishing boats, particularly for line fishing, during the 19th century and until the early half of the twentieth century. There are several still owned, used and maintained by community trusts.

The rig of a Sgoth is unusual in that the yard is longer than the mast, all of the rig fits comfortably within the boat as the mast was lowered when working with the lines. The boats were beach launched, when they were afloat they were loaded with ballast of stones from the shore; during fishing the stone ballast would be replaced by the catch.

As line fishing died out in the islands, the numbers of boats being built dwindled. In 1935 Jubilee was launched; she would be the last original working Sgoth. By this time the boats had been reduced to a fleet of around 27, and fishing was concentrated more to inshore waters. These are sometimes referred to as 'three quarter size' Sgoth Niseach.

Jubilee was restored as a community sailing boat in 1978, and more recently in 2005, and is operated by the community boat trust 'Falmadair'. She is based in Stornoway where she sails regularly, taking out members of the public as crew.

In 1994, a full size (33 feet) replica Sgoth was built in Stornoway by John Murdo Macleod, as the subject of a documentary film called An Sgoth. The boat was named An Sulaire (The Gannet).

Another three-quarter Sgoth Oigh Niseach (24 feet) built in Port of Ness in 1980 by John Murdo Macleod for Teddy Grey of the Garrygualach Adventure Centre is now operated by Raasay House on the island of Raasay. Bluebird, a half sized (16 ft) Sgoth, is based in Ness.
