= Swainbost =

Village in the Outer Hebrides, Scotland

Coordinates: 58.480°N 6.269°W

Swainbost: Scottish Gaelic: Suaineabost
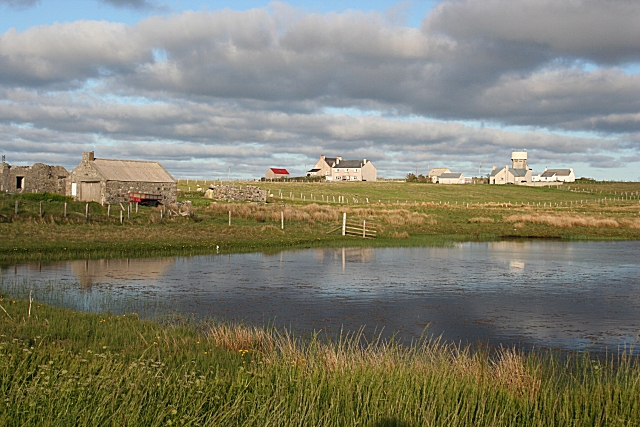
- An unnamed lochan at Swainbost

- Location within the Outer Hebrides
- Language: Scottish Gaelic; English
- OS grid reference: NB511625
- Civil parish: Barvas
- Council area: Na h-Eileanan Siar
- Lieutenancy area: Western Isles
- Country: Scotland
- Sovereign state: United Kingdom
- Post town: ISLE OF LEWIS
- Postcode district: HS2
- Dialling code: 01851
- Police: Scotland
- Fire: Scottish
- Ambulance: Scottish
- UK Parliament: Na h-Eileanan an Iar
- Scottish Parliament: Na h-Eileanan an Iar

Swainbost (Scottish Gaelic: Suaineabost) is a village on the Isle of Lewis in the district of Ness, in the Outer Hebrides, Scotland. The name Swainbost meaning Sweins steading is of Viking derivation. The settlement is situated in the parish of Barvas. According to Ronald Black, Swainbost was re-settled during the Highland Clearances in 1842. The island's Anglo-Scottish landlord had expected the crofters evicted from Uig to emigrate and only reluctantly granted them land at Swainbost to avert the threat of violence.

At the shore, there is a large depression called Suaineabost Sands which displays glacier activities and is run through by a river.

== Teampull Pheadair ==
The remains of the church of Saint Peter, Teampull Pheadair, are located north of the settlement. It existed since at least the 1600s and was probably restored and upgraded in 1722 when it became the meeting house for the north part of the Ness parish. In 1795 the church was enlarged and re-roofed but with the building of the new parliamentary church at Cross in the late 1820s the church fell out of use. However, the cemetery continued in use, with the stones from the church being used as grave markers and burials continued even after 1922, when the present Habost graveyard was built. There are many memorial stones to those lost in the Iolaire tragedy of 1919. It is estimated that the graveyard has more than 4,000 graves, but only 114 bear inscribed memorials, the earliest decipherable tombstone is of Alexander Murray from 1857, after the church had fallen out of use.

The site is a scheduled monument.

== Teampall Thòmais ==
Next to Teampull Pheadair are the ruins of Teampall Thòmais, the 'Church of St Thomas'. A local tradition states that the stones from Teampall Thòmais were used to build Teampull Pheadair. A geophysical survey by archaeologists in 2007 found that there were traces of build that was 16m by 8m at Teampall Thòmais.

== People ==
- Aonghas Caimbeul, alias Am Puilean (1903-1982), Scottish Gaelic Bard, war poet, and award-winning memoirist.
