= South Dell =

Coordinates: 58.469°N 6.317°W

South Dell: Scottish Gaelic: Dail-bho-Dheas
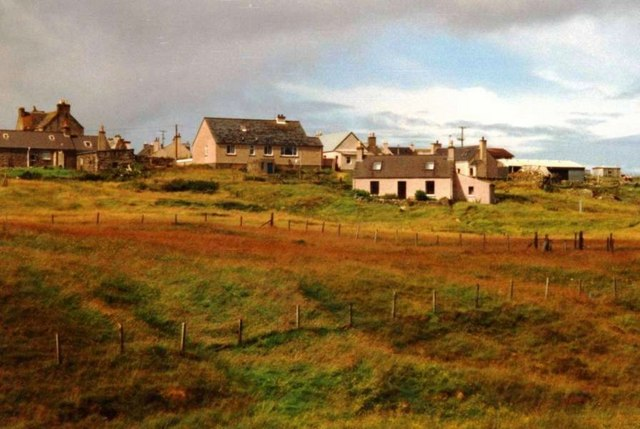
- Dail bho Dheas, South Dell

- Location within the Outer Hebrides
- Language: Scottish Gaelic; English
- OS grid reference: NB483614
- Civil parish: Barvas
- Council area: Na h-Eileanan Siar
- Lieutenancy area: Western Isles
- Country: Scotland
- Sovereign state: United Kingdom
- Post town: STORNOWAY
- Postcode district: HS2
- Dialling code: 01851
- Police: Scotland
- Fire: Scottish
- Ambulance: Scottish
- UK Parliament: Na h-Eileanan an Iar
- Scottish Parliament: Na h-Eileanan an Iar

South Dell (Scottish Gaelic: Dail-bho-Dheas) is a village on the Isle of Lewis in the community of Ness, in the Outer Hebrides, Scotland. South Dell is within the parish of Barvas, and is situated alongside the A857. The Dell River separates South and North Dell. The artists David Greenall and Ruth O'Dell live in South Dell.

== Archaeology ==
Two bronze swords from the 8th century BC were discovered in South Dell, in 1891–2. A wooden bowl, tentatively attributed to the Iron Age, and a flint arrowhead have also been found in South Dell.

Near South Dell is the site of Dunasbroc, an archaeological site on top of a stack. It was surveyed several times by archaeologists in 1978, 1996 and as part of the STAC: The Severe Terrain Archaeological Campaign project which ran from 2003 to 2005. This last project also conducted some archaeological excavations that found the site was occupied in the Neolithic and Iron Age periods. It may have been burnt down in the Iron Age as well but this less certain.

Some of the artefacts from the excavation are on display in the Museum & Tasglann nan Eilean.

== Images ==
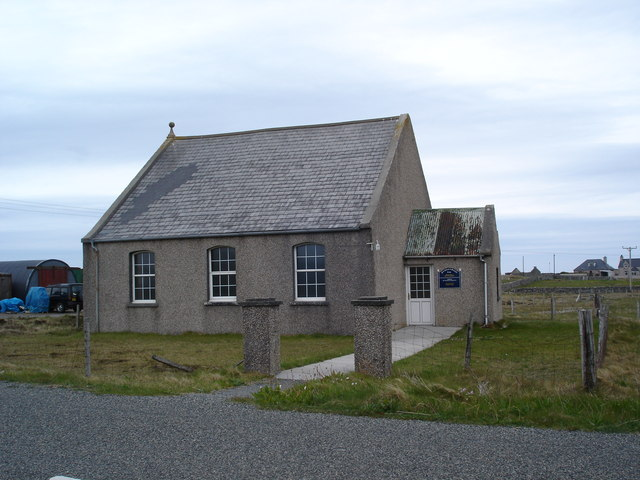

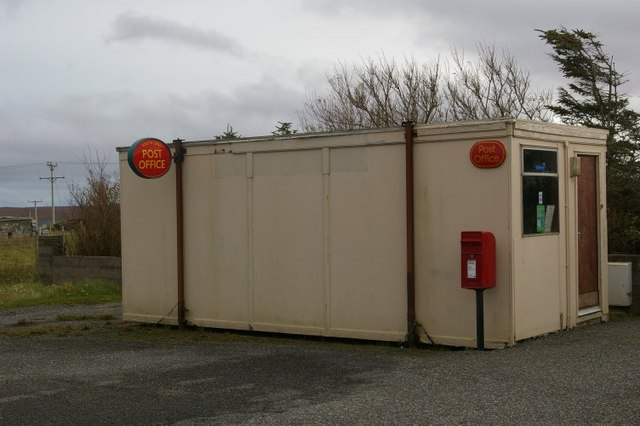

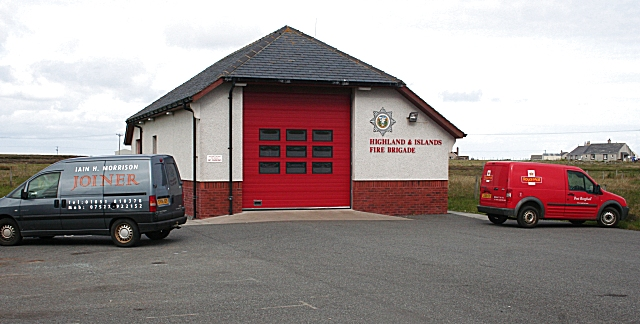
