= Clan Morrison =

Scottish clan

- MacGhille Mhoire
- Motto: Teaghlach Phabbay (Pabbay family)

Profile
- Region: Scottish Lowlands and Scottish Highlands
- District: Aberdeenshire (mainland Morisons); Outer Hebrides (Morrisons of Harris and Lewis)
- Plant badge: Driftwood

Chief
- Alasdair Morrison of Ruchdi
- Chief of Clan Morrison
- Historic seat: Bognie Castle (mainland Morisons); Dùn Èistean (Morrisons of Lewis)
Septs of Clan Morrison
Breive, Brieve, Gillamor, Gillemoire, Gillemor, Gillemore, Gillemur, Gillemure, Gilmer, Gilmoir, Gilmor, Gilmore, Gilmour, Gilmoure, Gilmur, Gilmure, Gylmor, MacBreive, MacBrieve, MacGilmor, McLemore, MacIllimhier, Morris, Morison, Morrieson, Morrison, Murieson, Murison, Murrison.
Allied clans
Clan Mackenzie
Clan Mackay
Rival clans
Macaulay family of Lewis
Clan MacLeod of Lewis

Clan Morrison is a Scottish clan. The Highland Clan Morrison is traditionally associated with the Isle of Lewis and Harris (Leòdhas) around Ness (Nis), Dun Pabbay, and Barvas (Barabhas), lands in Sutherland around Durness, and in North Uist. There are numerous Scottish clans, both Highland and Lowland, which use the surname Morison or Morrison. In 1965, the Lord Lyon King of Arms decided to recognise one man as chief of all Morrisons, whether their clans were related or not.

== MacGilleMhoire clan of Lewis ==
The Morrison clan centred on the Isle of Lewis derived their surname from MacGilleMhoire, a name said to mean "son of a servant of Mary". ("Mhic" meaning son, "Gille" meaning servant and "Mhoire" meaning Mary). In time this Gaelic surname was Anglicised as Morrison. The chiefs of the clan were the Morrisons of Habost and Barvas, and held the hereditary office of brieve. On consequence of this position the clan was also known as Clann-na Breitheamh. The Morisons held this office until 1613; and by the 19th century it was considered impossible to trace their descendants. The original spelling of the name is "Morison" with one "r", but in the early 19th century the spelling "Morrison" became popular. There are also alternative spellings, or septs, such as Gilmore. They were a numerous clan in Lewis, the population in 1861 numbered 1402, or one fifteenth of the population. These numbers indicate a domination of the island for many centuries.

Besides areas around the north of the Isle of Lewis, many Morrisons traditionally live in the north-west Highlands, in the county of Sutherland around Durness (Scottish Gaelic: Diùranais), together with their traditional allies, the Clan Mackay. "Many sanguinary battles, still recounted by tradition, were fought between the Mcleods and Macaulays on one side and the Morisons on the other. At last the Morisons were forced to leave Lewis and take refuge with that part of their clan which was settled in Duirness and Edderachyllius, Sutherland, where still, in 1793, the natives were all, except a few, of the three names of Mac Leay, Morison or Mcleod."

== Ó Muircheasáin clan of Harris ==
A group of the bardic Ó Muirgheasáin clan settled on the isle of Harris around 1600 under the service of the MacLeods of Harris and Dunvegan. At around this time, the file Ó Muirgheasáin replaced the bard Mac Gille Riabhaich, to the MacLeods of Harris and Dunvegan. The Ó Muirgheasáins ultimately had roots in the north of Ireland, within "O'Neill's country". The clan is thought to have established itself in the Inner Hebrides, on the isle of Mull, by 1512, likely patronised by the MacLeans of Duart. Despite their long service to the MacLeans and MacLeods, not one Ó Muirgheasáin poem, written for the MacLeans of Duart, exists to this day, and the earliest piece of poetry written for the MacLeods of Harris and Dunvegan only dates to 1626. In time the Harris Ó Muirgheasáins Anglicised their surname to Morrison. The Irish Gaelic Ó Muirgheasa means "descendant of Muirgheas". The personal name Muirgheas may be derived from the Gaelic elements muir, meaning "sea", and geas, meaning "taboo", "prohibition".

== Morrisons of mainland Scotland ==
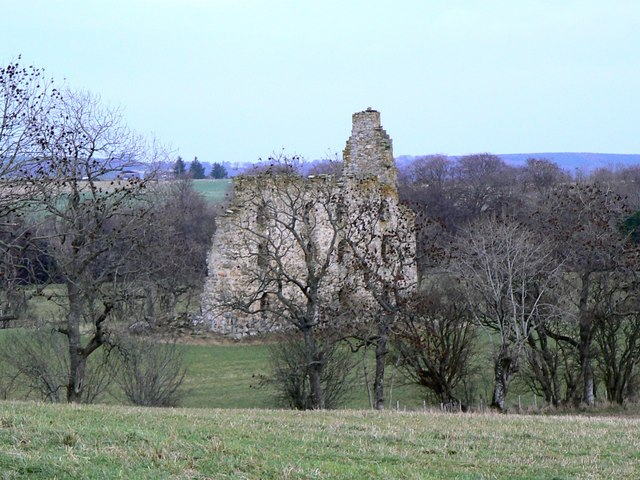
Ruined Bognie Castle, also known as Conzie Castle.

The surname Morrison is derived from the patronymic form of the personal name Morris. This personal name is a variant of Maurice, and was quite popular in the Middle Ages. The mainland Morrisons descend from a Norman named Maurice. The senior line of the mainland Morrisons were the Morisons of Bognie in Aberdeenshire. Many of the mainland and lowland Morrisons derived their name this way. The Morrisons of Perth and Lennox derive their surname in this way.

Within the north-east of Scotland, the Morisons of Bognie, in Aberdeenshire, are the principal Morison family. They are thought to be unrelated to the west coast (and Hebridean) Morrisons. The British royal family can claim direct descent from the early Morisons of Bognie through the maternal line of Lady Diana Spencer, Princess of Wales. In the aftermath of the infamous Fire of Frendraught, Alexander Morison acquired the lands of Bognie from Sir James Crichton of Frendraught in 1635, becoming the 1st Baron of Bognie. His son George Morison, 2nd Baron of Bognie, married Christian Urquhart, Viscountess Frendraught (the widow of James Crichton, 2nd Viscount Frendraught). The current representative of the family is Alexander Gordon Morison, 14th Baron of Bognie and Mountblairy. His son, Conner Morison, holds the Arms of the Younger of Bognie and Mountblairy.

The coats of arms of the Morisons of Dersay (or Darcie), in Fife; and the Morisons of Bognie; and the Morisons of Prestongrange utilise Moor's heads. This is a pun on the surname; an example of canting arms. According to the 19th-century historian William C. Mackenzie, it is uncertain whether or not these Morisons have any connection with the Lewis Morisons. Mackenzie noted that in the beginning of the 17th century, a son of the laird of Darcie went to Lewis to negotiate for the release of the Fife adventurers who had been held hostage.

=== According to the 'Indweller' of Lewis ===
In the late 17th century, the origin of the clan was documented within an historical account of Lewis written by John Morrison of Bragar, 'Indweller' of Lewis. The Indweller wrote this account sometime between about 1678 and 1688 and stated that the early inhabitants of Lewis were three men from three separate races.

The first and most antient Inhabitants of this Countrie were three men of three severall races viz. Mores the son of Kenannus whom the Irish historiance call Makurich whom they make to be Naturall Sone to one of the Kings of Noruvay. some of whose posteritie remains in the land to this day. All Morisones in Scotland may challenge there descent from this man. The second was Iskair Mac.Awlay ane Irish man whose posteritie remain likvise to this day in the Lews. The third was Macknaicle whose onlie daughter Torquill the first of that name (and sone to Claudius the sone of Olipheous, who likewise is said to be the King of Noruway his sone,) did violentlie espouse, and cutt off Immediatlie the whole race of Macknaicle and possessed himself with the whole Lews and continueth to his posteritie (Macleud of Lews) dureing 13 or 14 generations and so extinct before, or at least about the year 1600 the maner of his decay I omitt because I intend no historie but a descriptione.

— John Morrison of Bragar, A Descriptione of the Lews.

The 19th-century historian F. W. L. Thomas noted that the Indweller's traditional account was partly at odds with the traditions current in the 19th century. The 19th century tradition was that the heiress of the Morrisons would only marry a Morrison, and that Cain, who was a Macdonald from Ardnamurchan, passed himself off as a Morrison and consequently became her husband and thus brieve.

Thomas noted that it was claimed that Iain Sprangach, founder of the MacDonalds of Ardnamurchan, came to Uist and married a daughter of Macleod of Harris, and had a son named Murdo. Thomas considered that it was from this son that the Indweller's Makurich was derived. Thomas also noted that it was claimed that Aonghus Óg of Islay married a daughter of Guy O'Kaine. He also showed that this marriage is confirmed by the 17th-century Irish genealogist Dubhaltach Mac Fhirbhisigh, who wrote that the mother of John Mac Angus of Islay was Aine, daughter of Cumhaighe O'Cathain. Thomas maintained that it was through this marriage that the name Cain passed to the Macdonalds, and through them to the Lewis Morrisons, who still used it in the 19th century. Thomas concluded that the Indweller's Kenannus whom the Irish historiance call Makurich equated to Cathan Mac Mhurich. He considered that this man was the son of the Murdo who was the son, or grandson, of Iain Sprangach, founder of the MacDonalds of Ardnamurchan. It was from Cathan Mac Mhurich, Thomas stated, that the chiefly line of the Lewis Morrisons descended. Thomas also noted that the Harris Morrisons claimed to descend from the original stock of Morrisons.

=== According to the Bannatyne Manuscript ===
The Bannatyne Manuscript dates from about 1830 and is thought to have probably been written by Dr. William MacLeod Bannatyne. Within the manuscript is an account of the origins of the Lewis Morrisons:

Another tribe held Ness in the Lewes. They were called the Clan Igaa, or the Descendants of the Armourer. Their Chief possessed the Castle of Pabbay, afterwards one of the strongholds of the MacLeods. The power of this family also ended in an heiress who married Gillemhuire, a natural son of Olaf the Black, and a bastard brother of Leod. From them descended the Clan Gillemorrie, or 'Morison', afterwards so powerful as hereditary brieves or judges of the Lewes.

— Bannatyne Manuscript.

=== History ===
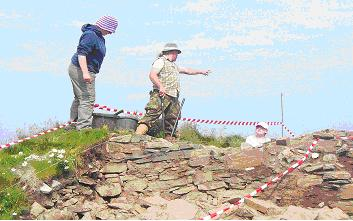
Archaeological excavation on the site of Dùn Èistean. The fort was once the seat of the Morrisons of Ness.

The first Morrison on record is Hutcheon (Scottish Gaelic: Ùisdean), a contemporary of Rory MacLeod, the last chief of Clan MacLeod of Lewis. Hutcheon held the hereditary office of brieve, on Lewis.

The Morrisons were also dominant in Durness (within "Clan Mackay Country"). According to tradition, Ay Mac Hormaid (Aodh Mac Thormoid) married a daughter (or sister) of the Bishop of Caithness, who bestowed on the couple the whole of Durness, with Ashir. Aodh then brought over a colony of about 60 families, mostly of his clan.

In the 16th century, Hutcheon Morrison confessed on his deathbed to being the biological father of Torquil MacLeod who had been assumed to be the son of the MacLeod chief. As a result, Torquil was disinherited and the office of chief of the MacLeods passed to another. Torquil, having been raised a MacLeod his whole life, viewed himself as the legitimate chief and made an alliance with the previously peaceful Morrisons and the more aggressive Clan Mackenzie. However, after defeating the MacLeods, Torquil declared himself a MacLeod and turned on the Morrisons and Mackenzies, forcing them from their lands and possessions. The Morrisons later returned to settle in Ness but, remaining enemies of the MacLeods, never achieved any status or power.

The Morrisons tried to live at peace with their more aggressive neighbours. The Macaulays of Lewis, who were centred in Uig, killed Donald Ban, the brother of John Morrison the Brehon, at Habost. When the Morrisons retaliated by raiding Uig, the MacAulays appealed to their allies, the Clan MacLeod of Lewis. The Morrisons were soundly defeated at the Caws of Tarbert, whereupon a strong force of MacAulays and MacLeods invaded the Morrison lands. The chief was captured and imprisoned at Rodil. He managed to escape, but the MacLeods used their influence with the king to have him declared an outlaw. As every man's hand was now turned against him, Morrison resorted to desperate measures and kidnapped one of the Macleod heiresses. He agreed to surrender her in exchange for a royal pardon.

The girl was released, none the worse for her ordeal. The feud was carried on by the next chief Uisdean, or Hucheon, who invaded north Harris. Once again, the Clan MacLeod of Lewis intervened, and Iain Mor MacLeod engaged the Morrisons at Clachan on Taransay. It is said that Hucheon was the only Morrison to survive the battle, swimming over two miles to the mainland despite serious wounds.

=== 17th century: last Macaulay-Morrison clan battle ===
According to local lore, on Lewis, the last great clan battle between the Macaulays and Morrisons took place in 1654. Local tradition gives several possible locations for the battle: two at Shader, one at Barvas, and one at Brue. One location, said to have been the battle-site is Druim nan Carnan ("the ridge of the cairns"), near Barvas. The conflict is said to have arisen after a group of Uig Macaulays raided cattle from Ness Morrisons. The Macaulays were only able to escape with their plunder as far as Barvas, where the two sides took to battle. It is not known how many died in the conflict, though tradition states that the fallen were buried in the area, and that their graves were marked by cairns which have now since disappeared. In June 2009, it was reported that one of the traditional sites of the battle, and possibly the graves of the fallen, may be damaged by a proposed plan to erect three wind turbines in the area.

According to Moncreiffe of that Ilk, it is unlikely that the brieves had any judicial authority after about 1595. The last Lewis brieve to be mentioned is 'Donald MacIndowie Brieff'; when the Tutor of Kintail issued a 'Letter of Fire and Sword' against him.

== Modern Clan Morrison ==
In 1965, the Lord Lyon King of Arms declared that there was then no traceable descendant of the chiefs of the Morrisons of Lewis. Lyon recognised Dr. John Morrison of Ruchdi as the 'principal chief of the whole name and clan of Morrison'. The Lord Lyon acknowledged that Morrison of Ruchdi could neither trace his descent from the Morrison brieves of Lewis, nor the Morrisons of Habost, nor the chiefs of the Morrisons of Lewis. The Lord Lyon acknowledged that Morrison of Ruchdi was chief of the Morrisons of Ruchdi; and that he could trace his lineage back about twelve generations, in a Gaelic pedigree, back to the Morrisons in the Dun of Pabbay on Tarbert of Harris. Lyon also recognised John Morrison, 1st Baron of Margadale as an 'area chieftain' or 'regional chieftain' of the Morrisons of Islay, the Sundrays and South West Scotland (areas also described by Lyon as the "Strathclyde area") under Morrison of Ruchdi. Morrison of Ruchdi also later, ca 1972, recognized John Morrison, 2nd Viscount Dunrossil as a 'regional chieftain' of North America. Lyon declared that further area chieftains could be recognized in time. For example, chiefs representing the line of the Morrisons of Habost and the brieves, the Morrisons of Lothian, and of Merse. However, these chieftains would also be under Morrison of Ruchdi. Dr. Ian Martin Morrison of Ruchdi assumed the Chief's mantle from his father on 12 June 1974. Dr. Ian was succeeded at his death by his son Dr. John Ruaraidh (Ru) Morrison on 11 December 2010. The current clan chief, R. Alasdair Morrison assumed the Chief's mantle on November 7, 2020, upon the death of his father

The Clan Morrison Society, which was established in 1909, bought Dùn Èistean and transferred ownership to John Morrison (great-grandfather of the current chief). Archaeological remains from the clan's history have been found on the island.

=== Symbols ===
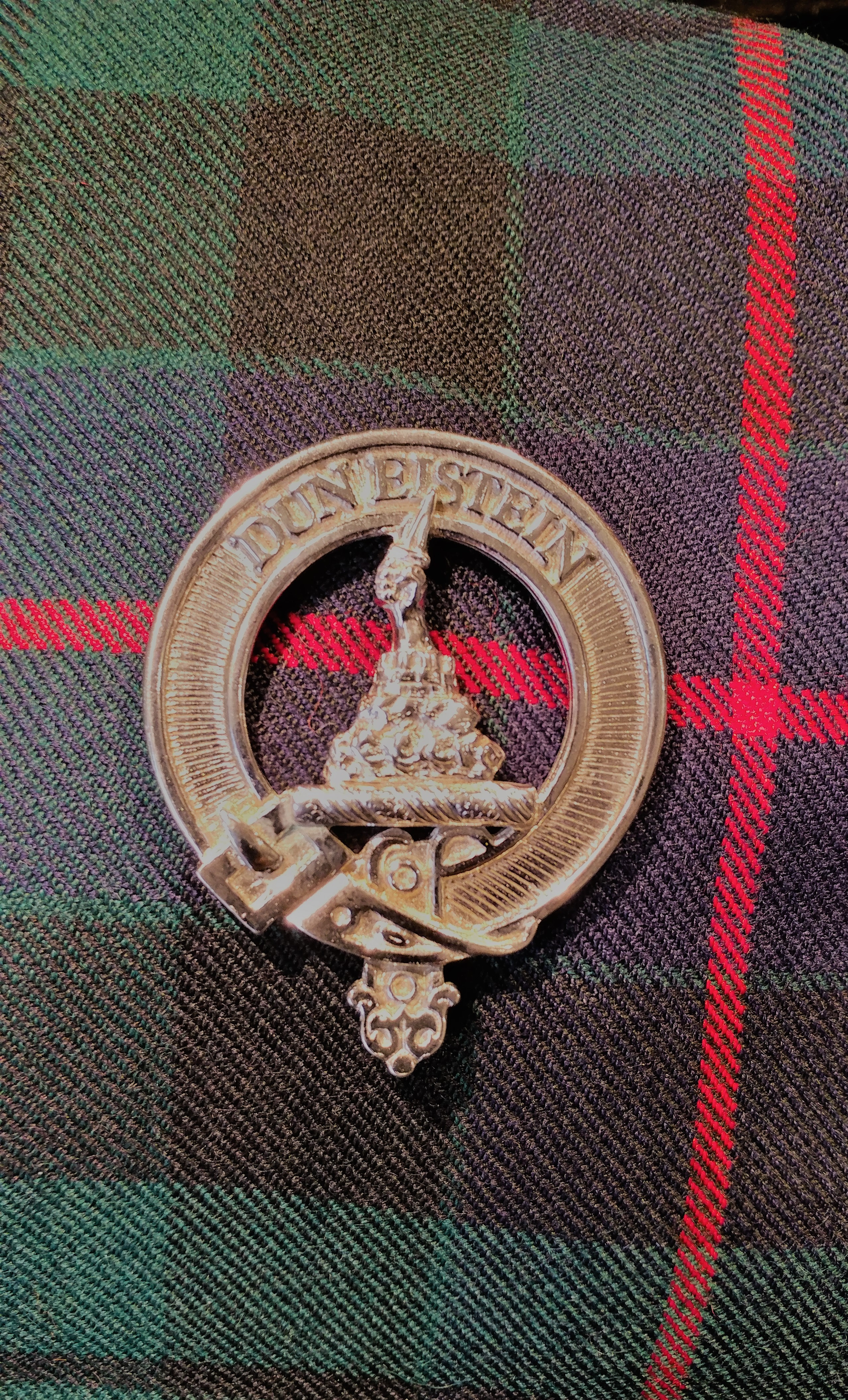
Morrison Badge and Hunting Tartan (Modern Colours)

The crest badge worn by members of Clan Morrison consists of the chief's heraldic crest and motto. By wearing this badge, clan members show their allegiance to their clan chief. The chief's motto is TEAGHLACH PHABBAY, which translates from Scottish Gaelic as "Pabbay family". This motto refers to the chief's descent from the Morrisons of Ruchdi, who claim to descend from the Morrisons of Dun Pabbay, on Harris. The chief's crest is issuant from waves of the sea Azure crested Argent a Mount Vert, thereon an embattled wall Azure, maisoned Argent, and issuing therefrom a cubit arm naked proper, the hand grasping a dagger hilted Or. The plant badge of Clan Morrison is driftweed.

There are several tartans attributed to the surname Morrison and Clan Morrison has an official clan tartan. This tartan was recorded by the Lord Lyon King of Arms on 3 January 1968. The tartan is based on a sett which was first found in 1935, when an old Morrison family bible was uncovered in a blackhouse which was to be demolished on Lewis. The piece of tartan was wrapped around the bible, and inside a note referencing the sett was dated 1745. The Clan Morrison Society (of Scotland) tartan is a variant of the Mackay tartan. This Morrison tartan dates from about 1908–1909. The society chose to base their tartan on the Mackay because of a historical link between Morrisons and Mackays. This link stems from the marriage of Ay Mac Hormaid and the daughter of the Bishop of Caithness. The bride's dowry consisted of the lands of Durness and subsequently sixty Morrison families emigrated there in the 17th century.

== Tartans ==
Tartan image	The red tartan was recognized as the clan's true tartan by Lord Lyon in the 1960s
Morrison Green Tartan	Morrison Red Tartan

== See also ==
- Dùn Èistean, once the stronghold of the Morrisons of Lewis
- Gilhemoire, progenitor of the Scottish Clan Morrison, and half-brother to Leod
- Isle of Lewis, traditional island homeland of the Clan Morrison
- Ness, a traditional home of the Clan Morrison.
- Durness, associated Highland home of some of the Clan Morrison
- Clan Mackay, traditional allies of the Clan Morrison
- Clan Macleod of the Lewes, the dominant clan on Lewis (pre 17th century)
- Clan Mackenzie, traditional allies of the Clan Morrison
- MacAulays of Lewis, a rival clan on Lewis
- Pabbay, Harris, a traditional home of the Clan Morrison
- Morrison (surname), people with the surname Morrison

== Sources ==
Footnotes

References

- Dictionary of American Family Names. Oxford University Press. ISBN 0-19-508137-4.
- A Dictionary of First Names. Oxford University Press. 1996. ISBN 0-19-280050-7.
- Anonymous (2005). The Scottish Clans and Their Tartans (30 ed.). Edinburgh: Kessinger Publishing. ISBN 1-4179-6815-X. Originally pub. by: W. & A. K. Johnston Ltd., Edinburgh and London, 1944
- Frank, Adam (1970). The Clans, Septs and Regiments of the Scottish Highlands (8th ed.). Edinburgh: Johnson and Bacon.
- Innes of Learney, Thomas (1971). The Tartans and Clans of the Families of Scotland (8th ed.). Edinburgh: Johnston and Bacon.
- Mackenzie, William Cook (1903). History of the Outer Hebrides. Paisley: Alexander Gardner.
- MacLeod, Roderick Charles (1927). The MacLeods of Dunvegan. Edinburgh: Privately printed for the Clan MacLeod Society.
- McLeod, Wilson (2004). Divided Gaels: Gaelic cultural identities in Scotland and Ireland, c.1200-c.1650 (Illustrated ed.). Oxford University Press. ISBN 978-0-19-924722-6.
- Moncreiffe of that Ilk, Iain (1967). The Highland Clans. New York: Bramhall House.
- Morrison, Leonard Allison (1880). The History of the Morison or Morrison Family. Boston, Mass: A. Williams & Co.
- Scottish History Society (1907). Publications of the Scottish History Society. Vol. 52. Edinburgh: Scottish History Society.
- Thomas, F.W.L. (1876–1878). "Traditions of the Morrisons (Clan Mac Ghillemhuire), Hereditary Judges of Lewis" (PDF). Proceedings of the Society of Antiquaries of Scotland. 12.
- Way of Plean, George (2000). Clans & Tartans. Glasgow: HarperCollins. ISBN 0-00-472501-8.
- Way, George and Squire, Romily. (1994) Collins Scottish Clan & Family Encyclopedia. (Foreword by The Rt Hon. The Earl of Elgin KT, Convenor, The Standing Council of Scottish Chiefs).
