= Murdoch Campbell =

Scottish minister and author (1900 - 1974)

Murdoch Campbell (1900–1974) was a Scottish minister and devotional author. He served as Moderator of the General Assembly of the Free Church of Scotland in 1956.

He has been called "the greatest Scottish devotional writer of the 20th century".

== Life ==
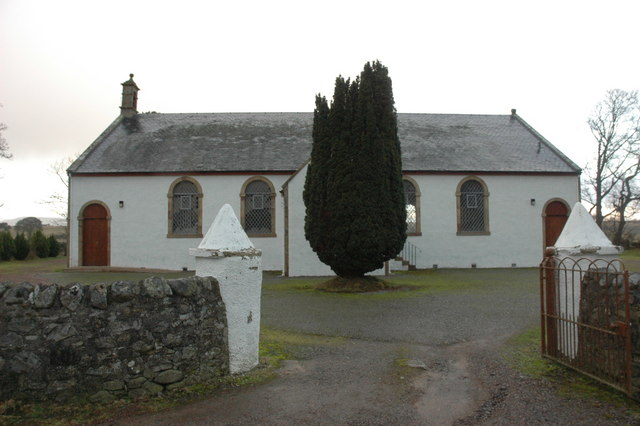
Resolis Church

He was born at Swainbost in Ness on the Isle of Lewis in 1900 the son of a crofting missionary of the Free Church of Scotland. He was educated locally until the age of 12 then apprenticed as a shipwright in Greenock. In 1918 he was conscripted into the army during the First World War. After the war he returned to Greenock as a shipwright.

In 1922 he studied to be a civil servant at Skerry's College in Edinburgh, then began studies in Divinity at Edinburgh University before training as a minister at the Free church of Scotland College in Edinburgh. His first ministry was at Fort Augustus.

He served as the Free church minister at Culnacarn on the Glenmoriston estate from 1930 to 1934 and gained a reputation as a fire and brimstone style preacher, focussed on the evils of sin. In 1934 he was translated to the Highland (Gaelic) Church in Partick, Glasgow.

In the Second World War he served as a Naval Chaplain at Portsmouth and Plymouth. In 1951 he became minister of Resolis on the Black Isle.

He retired due to ill-health in 1968. He died on 10 January 1974. He is buried in Fodderty graveyard.

== Family ==
He was married to Mary Fraser of Fodderty (b.1899). One child died in infancy. Their son David Campbell was involved in the publication of some of his works.

== Publications ==
- "God's Unsettled Controversy" (1941)
- "The Loveliest Story Ever Told" (1963)
- "Gleanings of Highland Harvest" (1964)
- "In All Their Affliction" (1966)
- "Memories of a Wayfaring Man" (1974-posthumous)
- "Wells of Joy" (Gaelic poems)
- "From Grace to Glory"
- "Everlasting Love: Devotional Sermons"
- "No Night There: Devotional Sermons"
- "The Suburbs of Heaven"
