= Teampall Mholuaidh =

Church in the Isle of Lewis, Scotland

Coordinates: 58°30′15″N 6°15′33″W

Teampall Mholuaidh (St Moluag's Church)
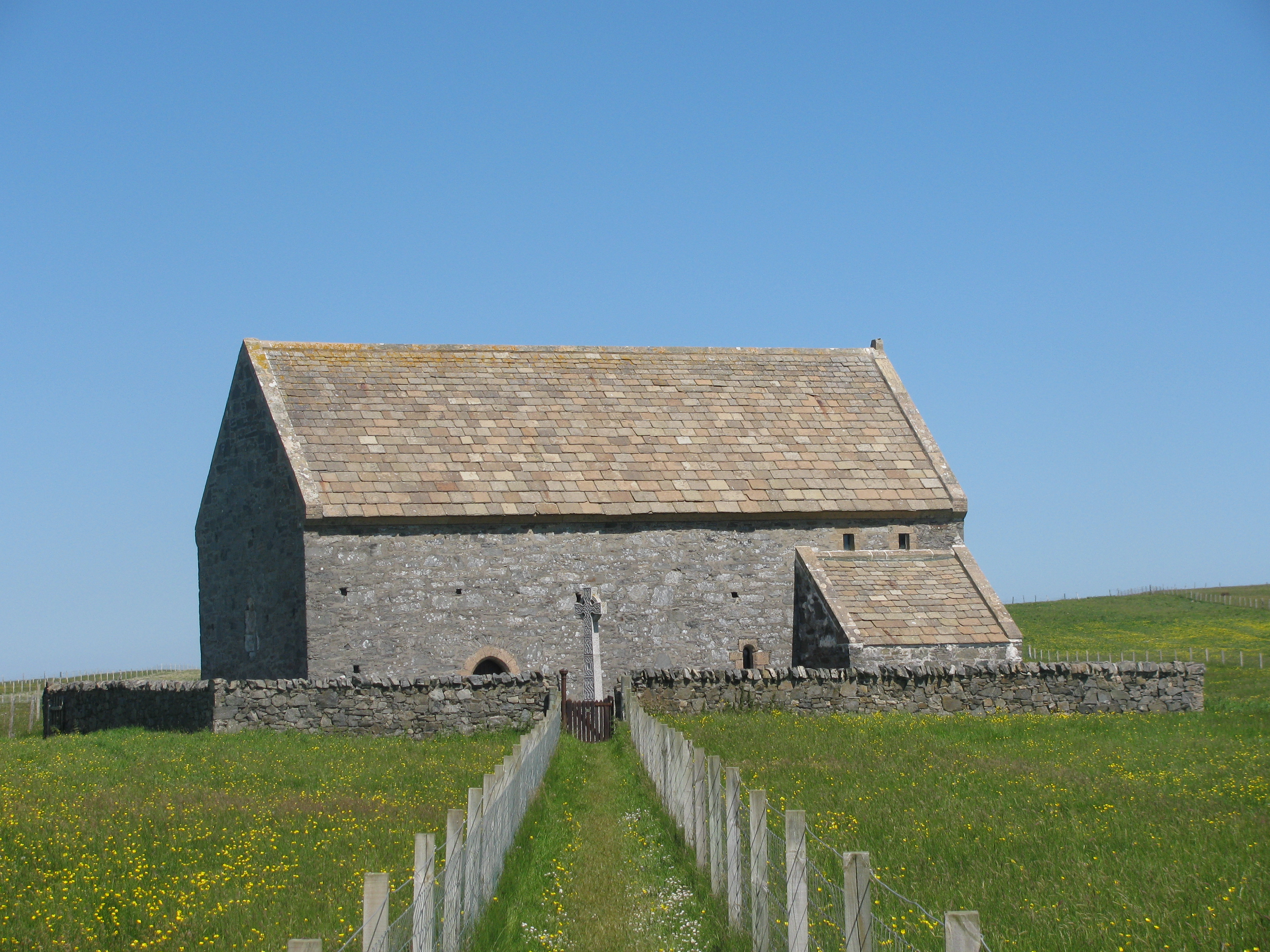
- Teampall MoLuaidh, 13th-century church in the village of Eoropie
- Teampall Mholuaidh (St Moluag's Church)
- Denomination: Episcopalian

History
- Dedication: St Moluag

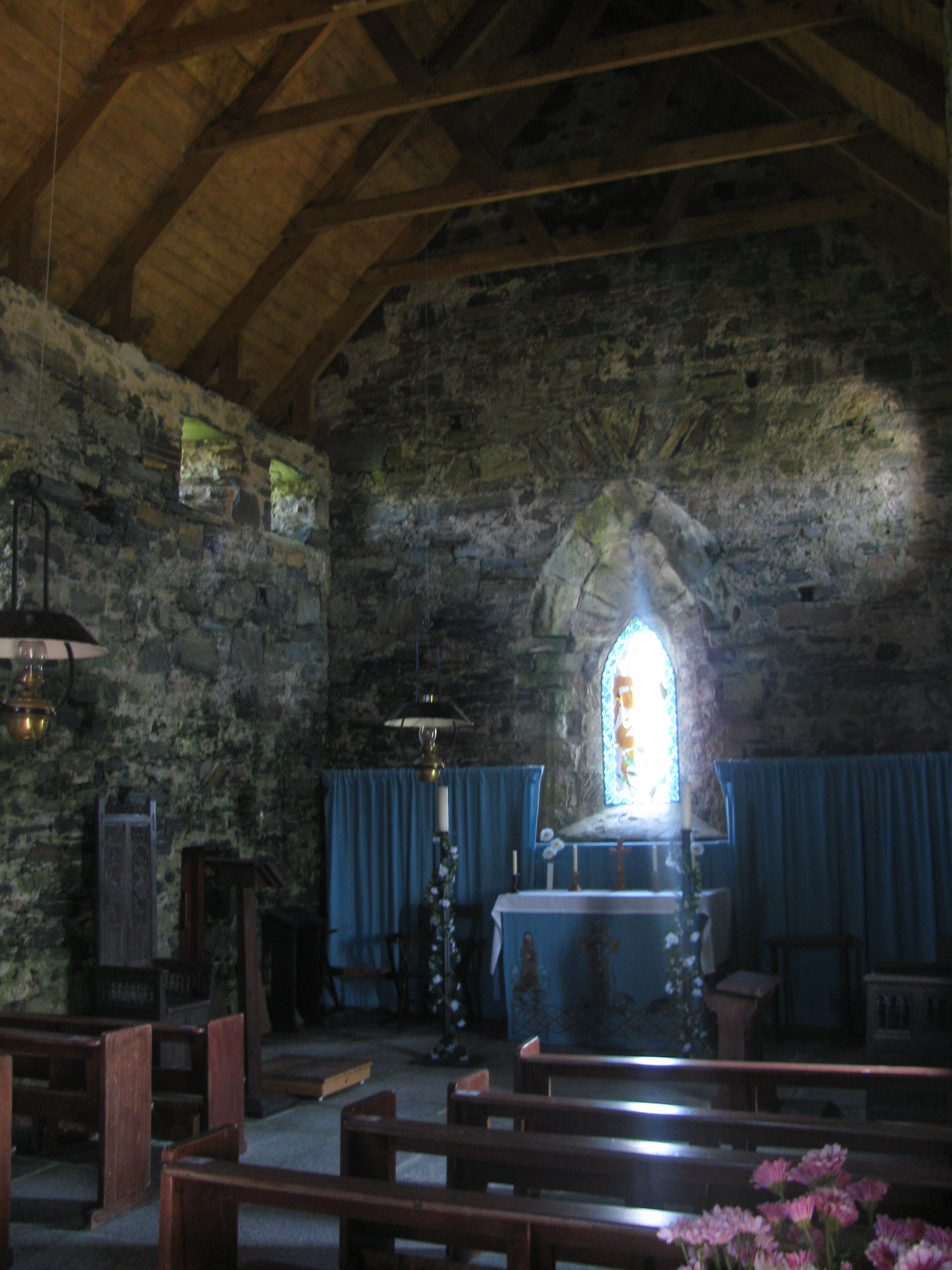
The church's interior

St Moluag's Church (Scottish Gaelic: Teampall MoLuaidh) is a church in the village of Eoropie (Scottish Gaelic: Eòrapaidh) in Ness in the Isle of Lewis in Scotland. It is one of the busiest visitor attractions in Ness, due to historical importance and because it is easily accessible from the road along a footpath.

Various sources attribute its construction to between the 12th and 16th centuries and small scale excavations in the 1970s did not provided any evidence on its date. The church has a basic T-shaped structure, with two small chapels on either side of the main body of the church. The southern chapel can only be accessed from outside. Outside is a war memorial in the form of a Celtic cross.

The church was roofless and used as a shelter for sheep before it was restored in 1911–12; the work was supervised by James Smith Richardson. The pulpit, altar and font are from 1911.

The church is now in use as a Scottish Episcopal Church. Regular services were revived in 1994. A lack of heating and lighting means alternative premises in Tong are used during the winter.

The church is traditionally considered to be the MacLeods’ church.

== Nearby churches ==
There are ruins of another temple "Teampall Ronaidh" about 500 metres (1,600 feet) north east of Teampall Mholuaidh and remains of another temple, "Teampall Pheadair", are about 2 kilometres (1 mile) southwest of Teampall Mholuaidh beside the old graveyard near the village of Swainbost.

== Traditions ==
One of the most enduring traditions associated with the church is its power as a place of healing, especially for those afflicted with mental problems. Many people were brought here in the hope of healing, and even those who could not reach the church sent wooden effigies of their afflicted parts. Captain John Dymes who came to Lewis in 1630 recorded that people who could not visit the church "were wont to cut out the portion of their lame arms or legs in wood with the form of their sores and wounds therof and send them to the saint where I have seen them lying on the altar of the chapel."
