= Gilhemoire =

Gilhemoire (born approximately 1207-8 AD) is the progenitor of the Scottish Clan Morrison, and half-brother to Leod, the progenitor of the Scottish Clan Macleod, according to Clan traditions.

== Life and family ==
Gilhemoire (alternatively written as; Gillemorrie, Gillemhuire, or Gillemhoire) was a natural (yet illegitimate — born out of wedlock) son of Olaf the Black and Lauon, a Kintyre noblewoman. Olaf and Lauon's marriage was not considered legitimate due to their kinship (cousins). Eventually the marriage was nullified by Bishop Reginald of the Isles, and Gilhemoire was declared illegitimate (concerning possible ascension to the Throne of the Isle of Man).This account is sourced from the Bannatyne Manuscript, and is verified by the oral traditions of the Clans Morrison and MacLeod.

Olaf the Black sired two sons in the Hebrides (in addition to at least 3 other sons in Norway). The sons were Leod and Gilhemoire, who became the progenitors of the Clans MacLeod and Morrison. Gilhemoire and Leod were half-brothers, Leod having been born of Christiana (daughter of Ferquhar, Earl of Ross), Olaf's third wife.

"The Morrisons, or Clann Mac Giolla Mhoire, descend from Gillemoire, illegitimate brother of Leod, thirteenth century ancestor of the MacLeods. Their territory lay in the extreme north of Lewis, the Morrisons being hereditary brieves, or brehon judges, for the whole island."

Gilhemoire is noted by the Morrisons of Ness and Harris (to the present day) as the first of the Morrison Clan, (Gaelic: MacGilleMhoire)

His place of birth has not been established, although most of the line believe Gilhemoire to have been born in The Isle of Lewis (The Lewes).

Gilhemoire married the last heiress (unnamed) of the Clan Igaa (Clan Gow, or Clan Harris), thereby acquiring the Castle Phabbay on the Island of Phabbay (which borders Harris). There was a split in the Clan Morrison, and some of Gilhemoire's descendants remain in this area of Scotland in modern times (The Morrisons of Harris).

== Understanding the Gaelic to English Translations ==
'Gilhemoire' means 'Servant of the Virgin Mary'.

The Gaelic name of the Clan Morrison is Mac Ghille Mhoire, which means "son of the servant of the Virgin Mary."

Dun means 'citadel' or 'castle'

== Castles: Dun Phabbay, and Dun Eistein ==
Lewis and Harris 'Islands' are parts of the same hebridean island

The original stronghold of Gilhemoire (Phabbay) is not to be confused with the citadel of Dun Eistein, later constructed on the Northern Tip of the Lewes by Gilhemoire's descendants (The Morrisons of Ness).

Gilhemhoire's descendants eventually branched: the Morrisons of Ness controlled Dun Eistein on the Isle of Lewis, while the Morrisons of Harris remained on the Isle of Harris, and held Dun Phabbay. The 'Isle of Lewis' and the 'Isle of Harris' are in fact parts of the same land mass.

== Gilhemoire's line in the present day ==
The current Chief of the Clan Morrison is R. Alasdair Morrison who assumed the Chief's mantle on November 7, 2020 after the death of his father Dr. John Ruairidh (Ru) Morrison, who took office on 11 December 2010; he is the Son of Dr. Iain M. Morrison, who took office on 12 June 1974. Dr. Iain M. Morrison was the Son of Dr. John Morrison, who was appointed as Chief of all Morrisons in 1965 by the Lord Lyon, King of Arms. Dr. John Morrison's lineage can be traced back thirteen generations to the Morrisons of Harris, the hereditary keepers of the Dun of Pabbay.

== From the Bannatyne Manuscript ==
"Another tribe held Ness in the Lewes. They were called the Clan Igaa, or the Descendants of the Armourer. Their Chief possessed the Castle of Pabbay, afterwards one of the strongholds of the MacLeods. The power of this family also ended in an heiress who married Gillemhuire, a natural son of Olaf the Black, and a bastard brother of Leod. From them descended the Clan Gillemorrie, or 'Morrison', afterwards so powerful as hereditary brieves or judges of the Lewes.".

The word 'them' in the above quote (in context, "From them descended the Clan Gillemorrie"), refers to Gillemorrie and his wife Heiress of the Clan Igaa, as opposed to the half-brothers Gillemorrie and Leod.

== From the Clan Morrison Society of North America ==
"The seat of the Morrisons of Harris was at Pabbay, a small island off the coast. One branch of this family were hereditary armorers to the MacLeods, who were the dominant clan of the Isle of Harris. It is from the Morrisons of Pabbay that our current chief descends. It is interesting to note that one of the two churches on Pabbay was named Teampull Mhoire, or 'Mary's Church.'"

== Bibliography ==
- MacLeod, Roderick Charles. The MacLeods of Dunvegan. Edinburgh, 1927. Privately printed for the Clan MacLeod Society.
- Sir Walter Scott, David Laing. The Bannatyne manuscript, Volume 1. Printed for the Hunterian Club, 1896.
- Morrison, Leonard A. The History of the Morison or Morrison Family. A Williams & Co. - Boston, Mass, 1880.
