= Stornoway High Church =

The High Church of Stornoway
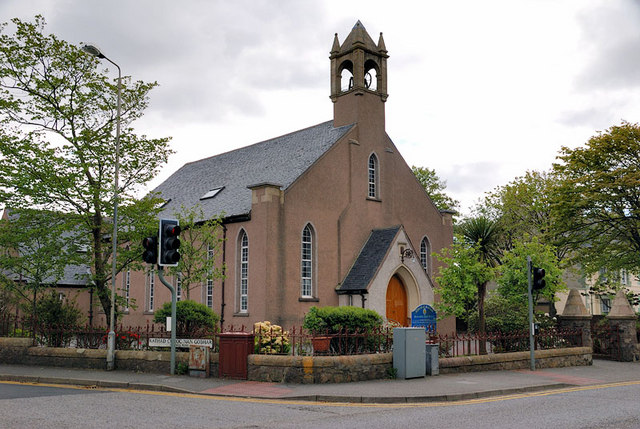
- High Church
- The High Church of Stornoway
- 58.2110°N 6.3821°W
- Location: Stornoway
- Address: Matheson Road Stornoway, HS1 2NQ
- Country: Scotland
- Language(s): English, Gaelic
- Denomination: Church of Scotland
- Previous denomination: United Free Church of Scotland
- Tradition: Evangelical
- Website: Church Website

History
- Former name: United High Free Church of Scotland
- Status: In congregation
- Founded: 1902
- Founder: The Reverend D. MacGregor

Architecture
- Functional status: Church
- Style: Victorian Gothic
- Completed: 1909

The Stornoway High Church is a place of worship of the Church of Scotland in Stornoway. The church celebrated its centenary in 2009. There is an English and Gaelic congregation in the church, the English congregation worships in the old church and the Gaelic congregation worships in the 'New Hall'.

== History ==
The congregation has its roots in the Free Church of Scotland and the United Presbyterian Church when the denominations, on the whole, merged to form the United Free Church of Scotland in October 1900. However, the congregation that was to form the High Church (at that time, the United Free High Church), was without a building.

A new building was planned, and on 1 August 1909, the Church took possession of its new home at the corner of Matheson Road and Goathill Road in Stornoway. In 1929, the congregations of the United Free Church united with the established Church of Scotland, with the Stornoway church becoming the Stornoway High Church of Scotland.

On 22 March 2019, the Rev. Gordon MacLeod was inducted as their minister.

At the close of 2022, the congregation had 82 members, served by 7 elders. By the year end of 2023, this had risen to 89 members and 9 elders. The rise continued into 2024, with 92 members being part of the congregation.

== Worship ==
The congregation has acts of worship at 11am and 6:30pm every Sunday. In addition, they also meet on Wednesday evenings at 7:30pm.

== 2013 secession ==
At a meeting on 18 June 2013, 250 members of the church's congregation voted to leave the Church of Scotland over disagreement with its handling of the issue of gay clergy. Those who left joined later to the Free Church of Scotland and established a new congregation named Stornoway High Free Church. Until that point, it had been the largest congregation within the Western Isles, and one of the largest Presbyterian churches in Scotland.
