= Borve, Lewis =

Coordinates: 58.417°N 6.432°W

Borve: Scottish Gaelic: Borgh
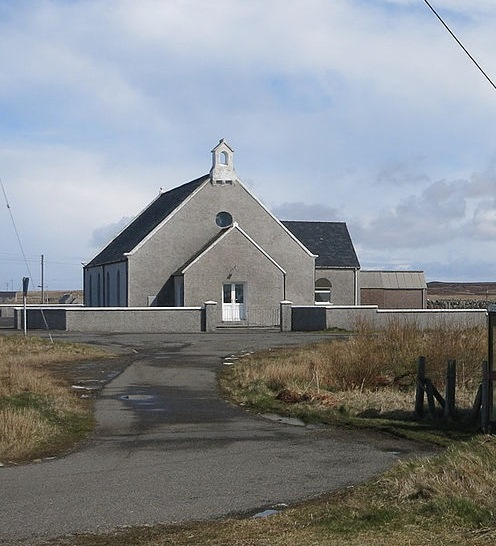
- Borve Free Church

- Location within the Outer Hebrides
- Language: Scottish Gaelic; English
- OS grid reference: NB412561
- Civil parish: Barvas
- Council area: Na h-Eileanan Siar
- Lieutenancy area: Western Isles
- Country: Scotland
- Sovereign state: United Kingdom
- Post town: ISLE OF LEWIS
- Postcode district: HS2
- Dialling code: 01851
- Police: Scotland
- Fire: Scottish
- Ambulance: Scottish
- UK Parliament: Na h-Eileanan an Iar
- Scottish Parliament: Na h-Eileanan an Iar

Borve (Scottish Gaelic: Borgh) is a village on the west side of the Isle of Lewis in Scotland, 17 miles (27 kilometres) from the island's only town, Stornoway.

== Location ==
The village lies on the River Borve, which is crossed by two adjacent bridges. The older bridge, built of stone rubble and consisting of a single arch, dates from the late 19th century and is no longer used for road traffic. The modern bridge was built in the early 1990s at a cost of £250,000. The main road through the village is the A857 between Stornoway and Ness.

The village is in three parts: Borve, previously Fivepenny Borve, which stretches from the southern boundary to the river Borve; High Borve, previously Mid-Borve, north of the river; and Melbost Borve, nearest Galson.

== History ==
=== Prehistory ===
In Melbost Borve there are the remains of a burial ground (Cladh Bhrighid) and the barely visible ruins of a tiny chapel, Teampall Bhrìghid, and a well, Tobar Bhrìghid, - all dedicated to St Brigid.

About 1/2 mile (800 metres) north of Melbost Borve stand the ruins of the pre-Norse broch Dun Bhuirgh. Its name derives from the old Norse word borg, meaning a fort, and according to 19th-century accounts is the origin of the village's name. The original fort was circular in shape with an internal diameter of 30 feet (9 metres) and walls 11 ft (3.4 m) thick.

=== The Clan Macquarrie rescue ===
On the night of 31 January to 1 February 1953, the Clan Line vessel SS Clan Macquarrie (7131 tons) was driven onto the foreshore at Borve by gales. Braving the horrendous weather, with winds gusting up to 100 mph (160 km/h; 45 m/s), local men got a breeches buoy onto the vessel and rescued all 66 crew members. In recognition of the villagers' courage and hospitality, the Clan Line donated funds for the construction of a village hall.

== War memorial ==
To the north of the Community Centre stands the North Lewis War Memorial, which records the names of men from Borve, Galson, Shader, and Ballantrushal who died in the two World Wars and the Iolaire Disaster of 1919. The memorial also records one casualty of the Boer Wars.

== Churches ==
Borve Free Church is in the village centre. The church has recently been used for traditional Hebridean weddings.

=== Teampall Bhrìghid ===
The ruins of an earlier church and graveyard, Teampall Bhrìghid (St Bridget's Church) are found in Melbost Borve. The stone has been robbed out to build other structures and all that remains of the church, now, is a grassy mound. Local tradition holds that Swain, a Norse king, was buried with his crown at Teampall Bhrìghid.
