= Eoropie =

Coordinates: 58.503°N 6.266°W

Eoropie: Scottish Gaelic: Eòrapaidh
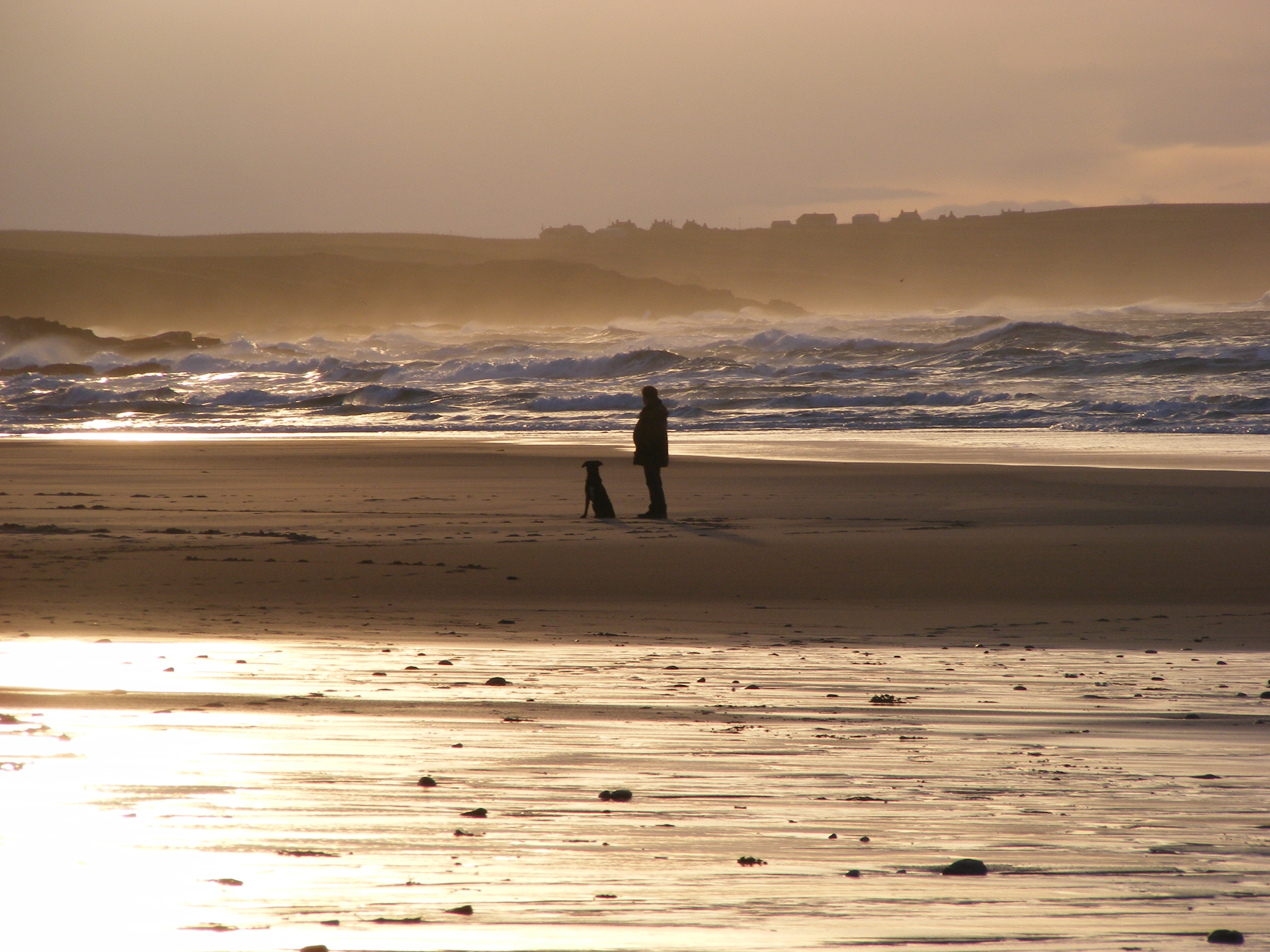
- The beach at Eoropie

- Location within the Outer Hebrides
- Language: Scottish Gaelic; English
- OS grid reference: NB515650
- Civil parish: Barvas
- Council area: Na h-Eileanan Siar
- Lieutenancy area: Western Isles
- Country: Scotland
- Sovereign state: United Kingdom
- Post town: STORNOWAY
- Postcode district: HS2
- Dialling code: 01851
- Police: Scotland
- Fire: Scottish
- Ambulance: Scottish
- UK Parliament: Na h-Eileanan an Iar
- Scottish Parliament: Na h-Eileanan an Iar

Eoropie (Scottish Gaelic: Eòrapaidh) is the most northerly village on the Isle of Lewis in the parish of Ness, in the Outer Hebrides, Scotland. Eoropie is within the parish of Barvas. The Teampull Mholuaidh is found here. Eoropie is situated at the end of the B8013 and B8014 roads, from Lionel and Port of Ness, respectively.

It is just south of the Butt of Lewis and contains the Eoropie Dunes Park.

== Landmarks ==
=== Teampall Rònaidh/Rònain ===
In Eoropie is Teampall Rònaidh which are the remains of chapel that is a scheduled ancient monument and is believed to be the oldest church site in Northern Lewis. Local tradition associations the site with the island of North Rona. It is said that St Ronan was taken from Ness to North Rona on the back of a sea monster. It is said to have been built by a person named Rònaidh, who lived in it with his sister.

=== Teampall Mholuaidh ===
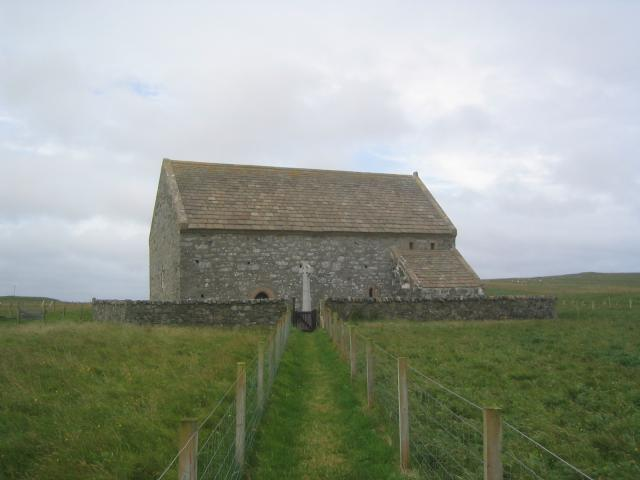
Teampall Mholuaidh

Another historical church in Eoropie is Teampall Mholuaidh (St Moluag's) which possibly dates from sometime between the 12th to 16th centuries. For a while it was roofless and being used as a shelter for sheep until it was restored in 1912 and is now a Scottish Episcopal Church. The church is traditionally considered to be the MacLeods’ church.

=== Eoropie Beach ===
This is a wide sandy beach on the edge of Eoropie.

=== Eoropie Dunes Park ===
This is a four acre play site. The park is managed by a charity called Guth Airson Iarrtasan Nis (A Voice for the Needs of Ness). It was set up in 1998 "to enhance play and leisure facilities and encourage environmental awareness," by a group of mothers who had no local playground for their children. The land was donated by the crofting families who traditionally worked the sandy 'machair' land along the west coast of Lewis.
