= Ness, Lewis =

Coordinates: 58.47°N 6.25°W

Ness: Scottish Gaelic: Nis
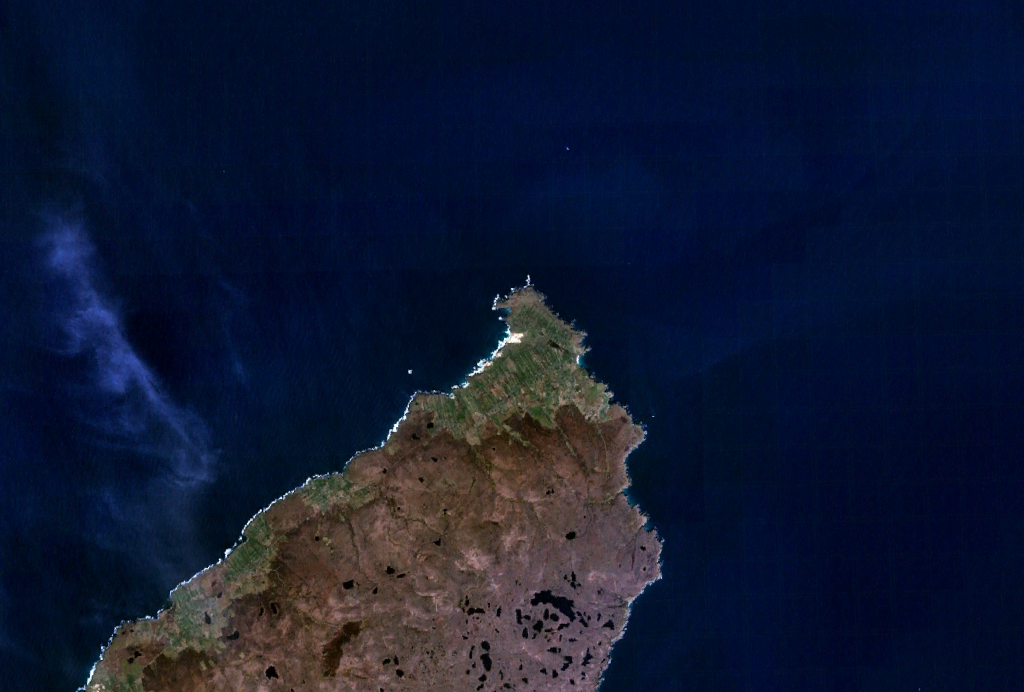
- Landsat image of the north of Lewis

- Location within the Outer Hebrides
- Population: 1,300
- Language: Scottish Gaelic; English
- OS grid reference: NB5261
- Civil parish: Ness
- Council area: Na h-Eileanan Siar
- Lieutenancy area: Western Isles
- Country: Scotland
- Sovereign state: United Kingdom
- Post town: STORNOWAY
- Postcode district: HS2
- Dialling code: 01851 810
- Police: Scotland
- Fire: Scottish
- Ambulance: Scottish
- UK Parliament: Na h-Eileanan an Iar
- Scottish Parliament: Na h-Eileanan an Iar

Ness (Scottish Gaelic: Nis) is the northernmost part of the Isle of Lewis, a community consisting of about 16 villages, including Lionel, Habost, Swainbost, Cross, North and South Dell, Cross Skigersta, Skigersta, Eorodale, Adabroc, Port of Ness, Knockaird, Fivepenny and Eoropie. It was the most north-westerly community in the European Union, when the United Kingdom was a member. Its most northerly point is the Butt of Lewis. The name Ness derives from the old Norse for headland and many of the other place names in the area also have a Norse origin.

== History ==
In the medieval period, the Ness area was dominated by the Clan Morrison, including the island of Dùn Èistean where numerous archeologically remains have been discovered.

In 1862, 31 fisherman from Ness were lost during a storm in what was named the 'Great Drowning of Ness'. The incident resulted in 24 widows and 71 children being left without fathers.

In 1919, a Ness boat builder called John F. Macleod from Port saved 40 lives following the sinking of H.M.Y. Iolaire by managing to take a line to shore.

The Ness Historical Society, the first historical society to be established in the Outer Hebrides, was established in 1977.

Since 2007, Ness is part of the Galson Estate, which is owned by Urras Oighreachd Ghabhsainn (Galson Estate Trust) which is managed by 10 local trustees elected by the community. The official hand-over took place on 12 January 2007.

In 2011, the small school at Cross closed due to declining rolls, latterly having only 19 pupils. The buildings, including Ness Hall have now been taken over by Comunn Eachdraidh Nis, the Ness Historical Society as a museum.

== Community ==
Scottish Gaelic is the language of the community with 75% being able to speak it. Peat cut from the moor, is used as a fuel for cooking and heating in many homes, but its use is on the decline. The 2001 Census results show a resident population of just under 1,000. In 1831 Ness had a population of just over 3,000.

=== Traditions ===
The Guga hunt is a traditional practice in which each year 10 men from Ness go out to the island of Sula Sgeir in late August to September for a fortnight to harvest around 2,000 young gannets known locally as Guga. The bird considered a delicacy. The practice was described at length as part of the story in The Blackhouse novel by Scottish writer Peter May, much of which is set in Ness.

Ness is known for its Sgoth, a type of clinker built skiff with a dipping lug sail. The boats were used for line fishing until the early half of the twentieth century. There are several still in active use owned by community trusts which maintain them.

== Transport ==
Ness is accessible via the A857 road and is about 25 mi (40 km) by road from Stornoway. Ness can also be reached by walking across the moor from North Tolsta in Back to Skigersta. It is about 10 mi (16 km) and takes 6 hours at a leisurely pace.

== Landmarks ==
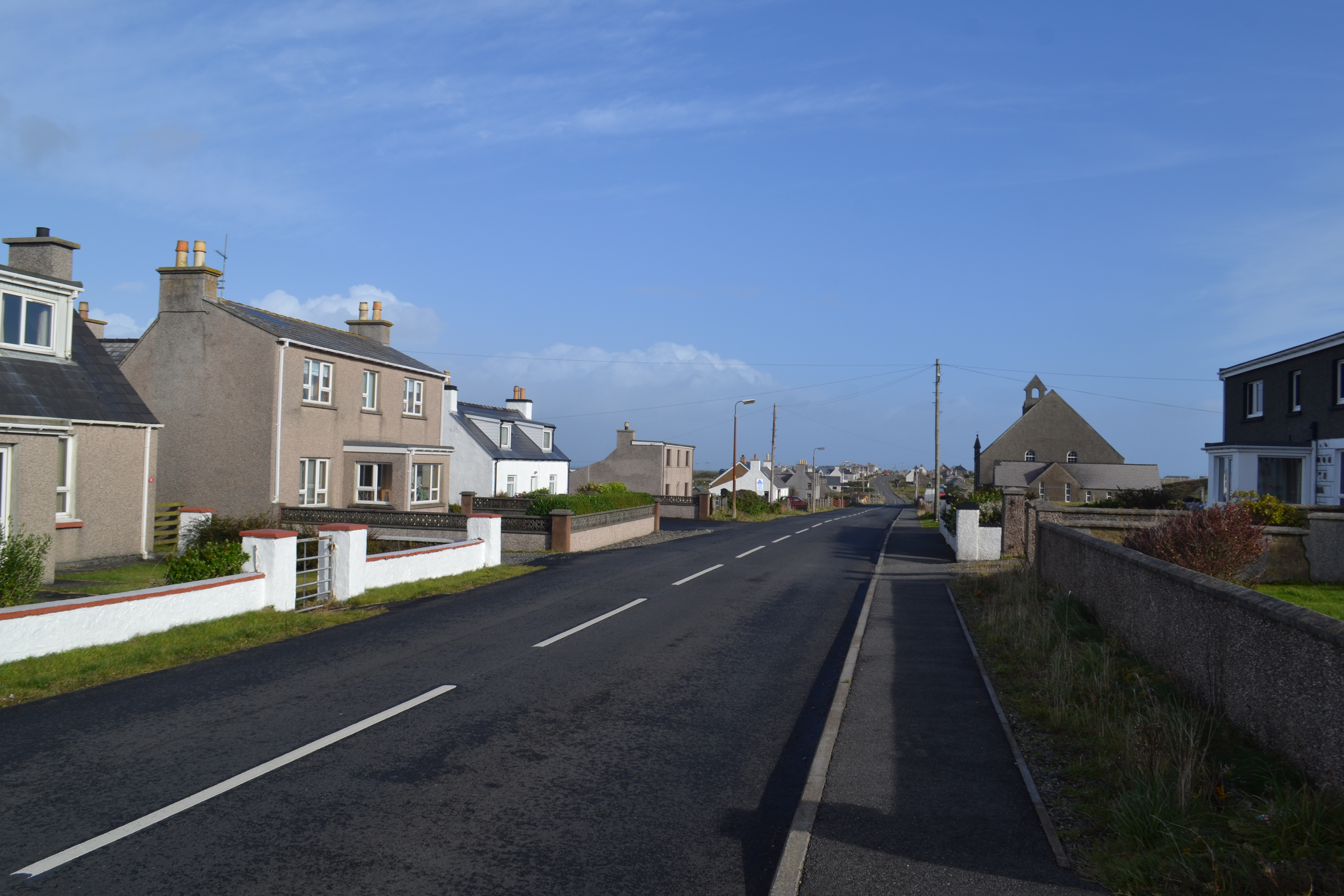
The main settlement at Ness in 2017

Landmarks include the 13th-century Teampull Mholuaidh in Eoropie and the small island of Dùn Èistean which is the ancestral home of the Lewis Morrisons of the Clan Morrison. There is a road sign to the bridge across to Dùn Èistean, and archaeological excavations have been taking place there. Morrisons of Harris and Lewis can traditionally be found around Nis, and in the north-west Highlands in the county of Sutherland around the town of Durness (Scottish Gaelic: Diùranais).

There is a Ness Fishery Memorial above the harbour at Port of Ness that honours the local fisherman who have died as a result of sinkings and drownings. The memorial was unveiled in 2014 at the instigation of local veteran boat-builder John Murdo Macleod.

== Education ==
Lionel School is the only remaining school providing for Ness. The school roll is 116.

== Sport ==
Football is the main sport with Ness FC playing their home matches on Fivepenny Machair. 'Spors Nis' is a new (2007) Community Sports Centre with all the modern facilities you would expect including a two lane 10 pin bowling alley. Lionel School also has a swimming pool which is open to the public when not in use by the school.

== Notable people ==
- Murdoch Campbell, minister
