= Port of Ness =

Coordinates: 58.493°N 6.227°W

Port of Ness: Scottish Gaelic: Port Nis
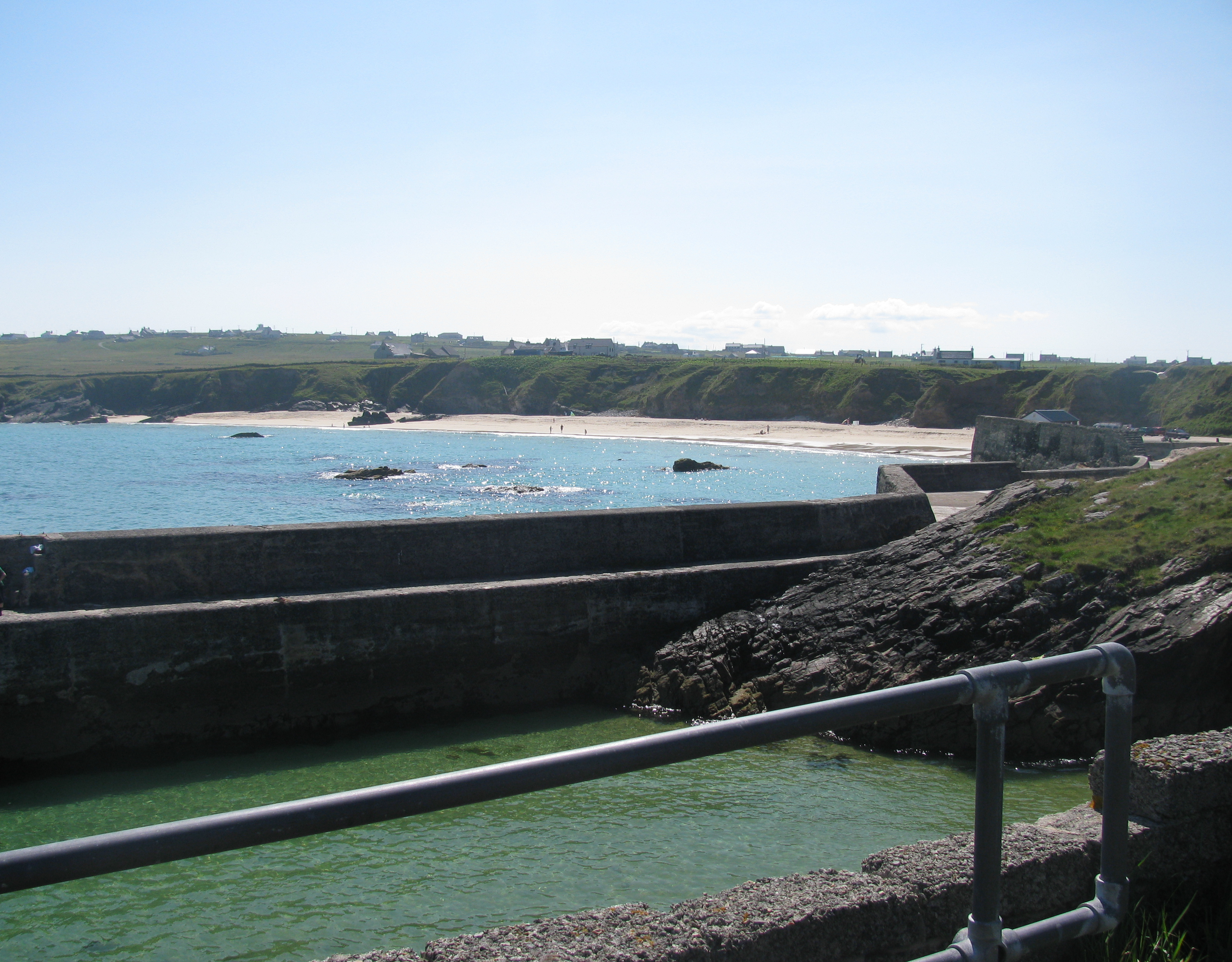
- Port of Ness, the beach and the harbour basin

- Location within the Outer Hebrides
- Language: Scottish Gaelic; English
- OS grid reference: NB537638
- Civil parish: Barvas
- Council area: Na h-Eileanan Siar
- Lieutenancy area: Western Isles
- Country: Scotland
- Sovereign state: United Kingdom
- Post town: ISLE OF LEWIS
- Postcode district: HS2
- Dialling code: 01851 810
- Police: Scotland
- Fire: Scottish
- Ambulance: Scottish
- UK Parliament: Na h-Eileanan an Iar
- Scottish Parliament: Na h-Eileanan an Iar

Port of Ness (Scottish Gaelic: Port Nis) is a village on the Isle of Lewis in the community of Ness, in the Outer Hebrides, Scotland. Port of Ness is within the parish of Barvas. Port of Ness is situated at the end of the A857, which runs from Stornoway. In 2014, the Ness Fishery Memorial was erected to celebrate the fishing heritage in the area and to commemorate the 96 people who lost their lives in the industry between 1835 and 1900.

== Harbour ==
The harbour was constructed in the early 19th century. An enlargement was built in 1893, with a breakwater added the following year. Each year men from Ness district sail from the port to Sula Sgeir in the Atlantic Ocean in order to collect young gannet for food. The event, which was first recorded in the 16th century, is now licensed by the Scottish government.

== Heritage Sites ==
The Clach Stein standing stones are situated just to the north of the settlement. To the south is Dun Eòradail a settlement on top of a sea stack/island. Nothing is known about Dun Eòradail other than it contains the ruins of several structures. It is thought to date from the medieval period because of its similarity to other medieval settlements but no archaeological excavations have been conducted on it to confirm that.

== Geology ==
The quaternary geology of Port of Ness bay have led to it being designated a Site of Special Scientific Interest by NatureScot.

== In Literature ==
The boathouse at the harbour features in the Peter May novels, The Blackhouse and The Lewis Man.

== Images ==
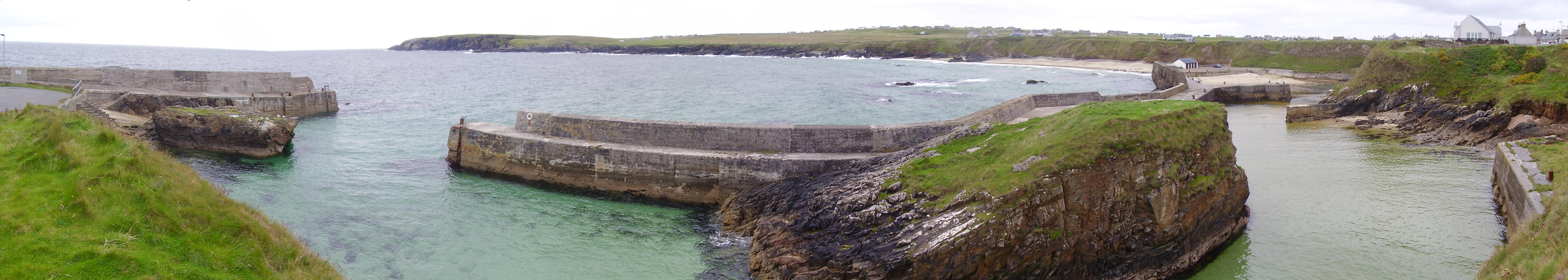

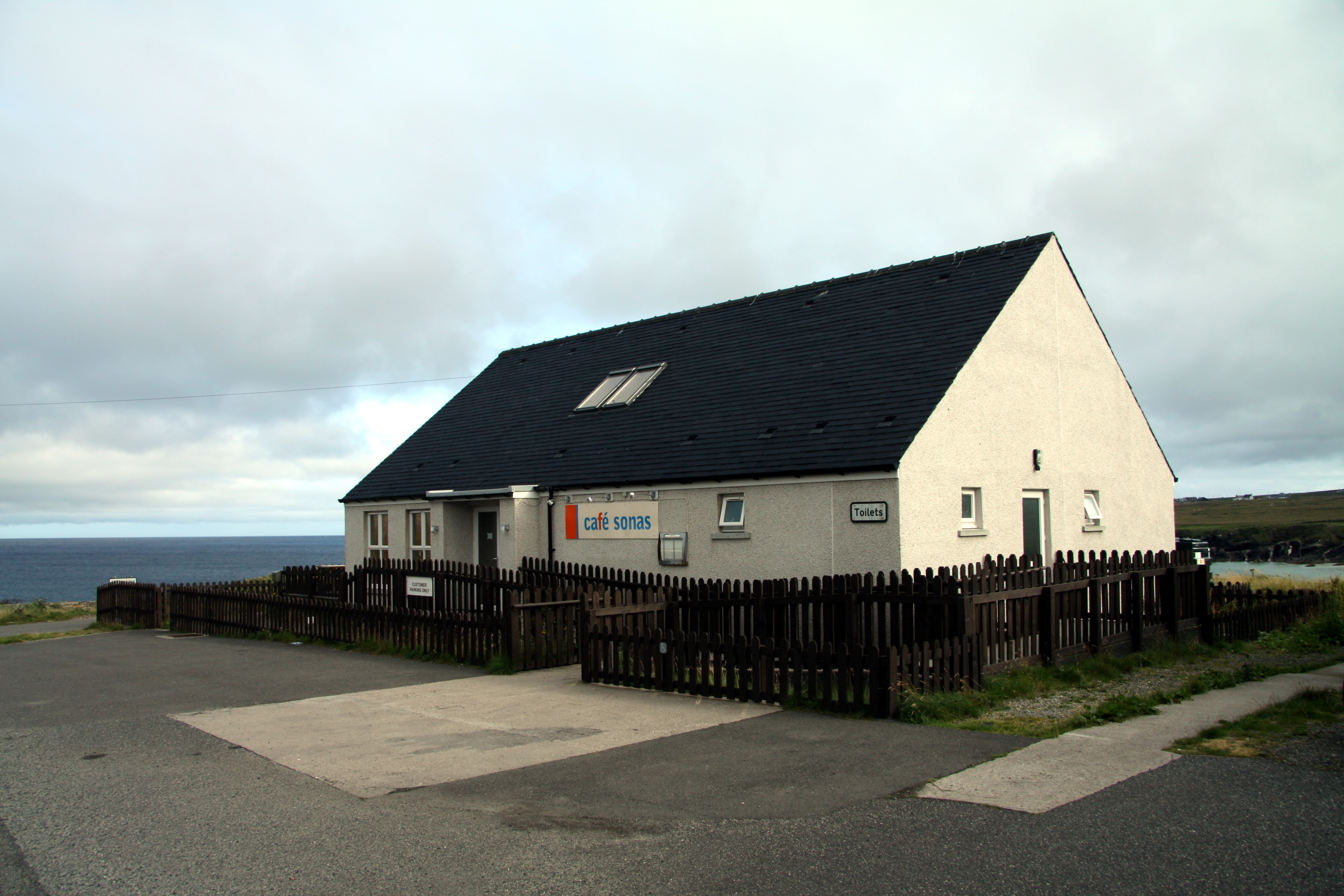

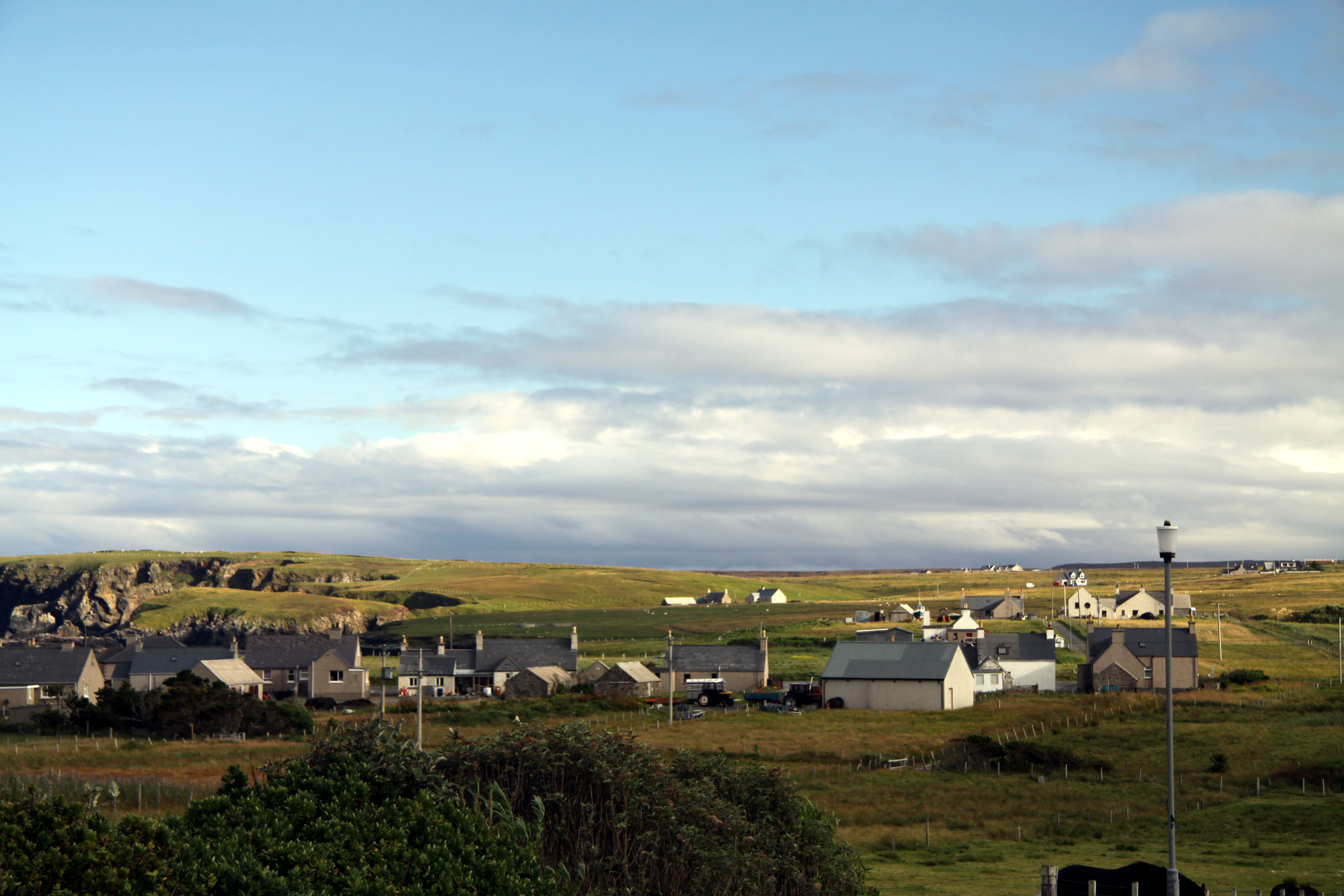

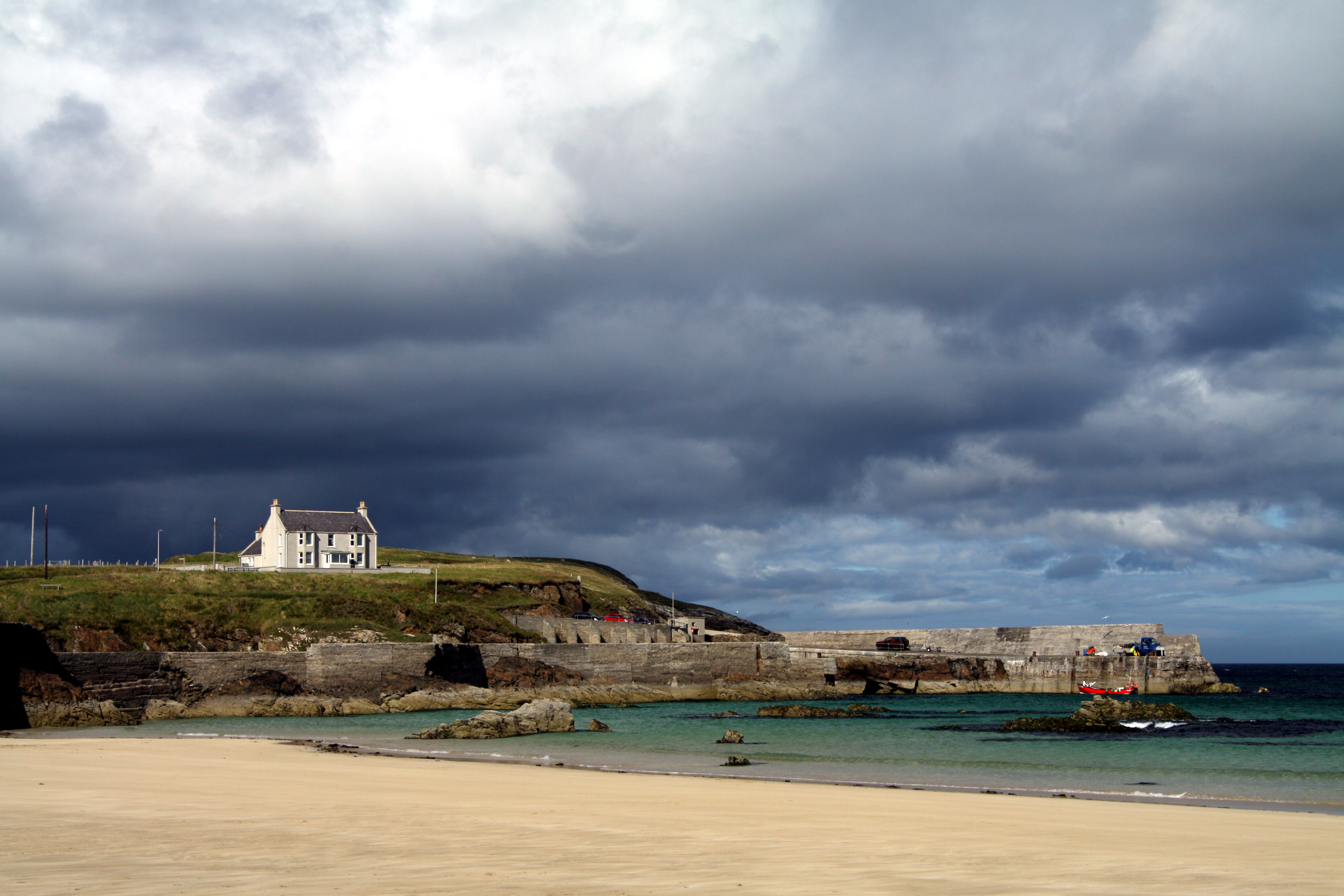

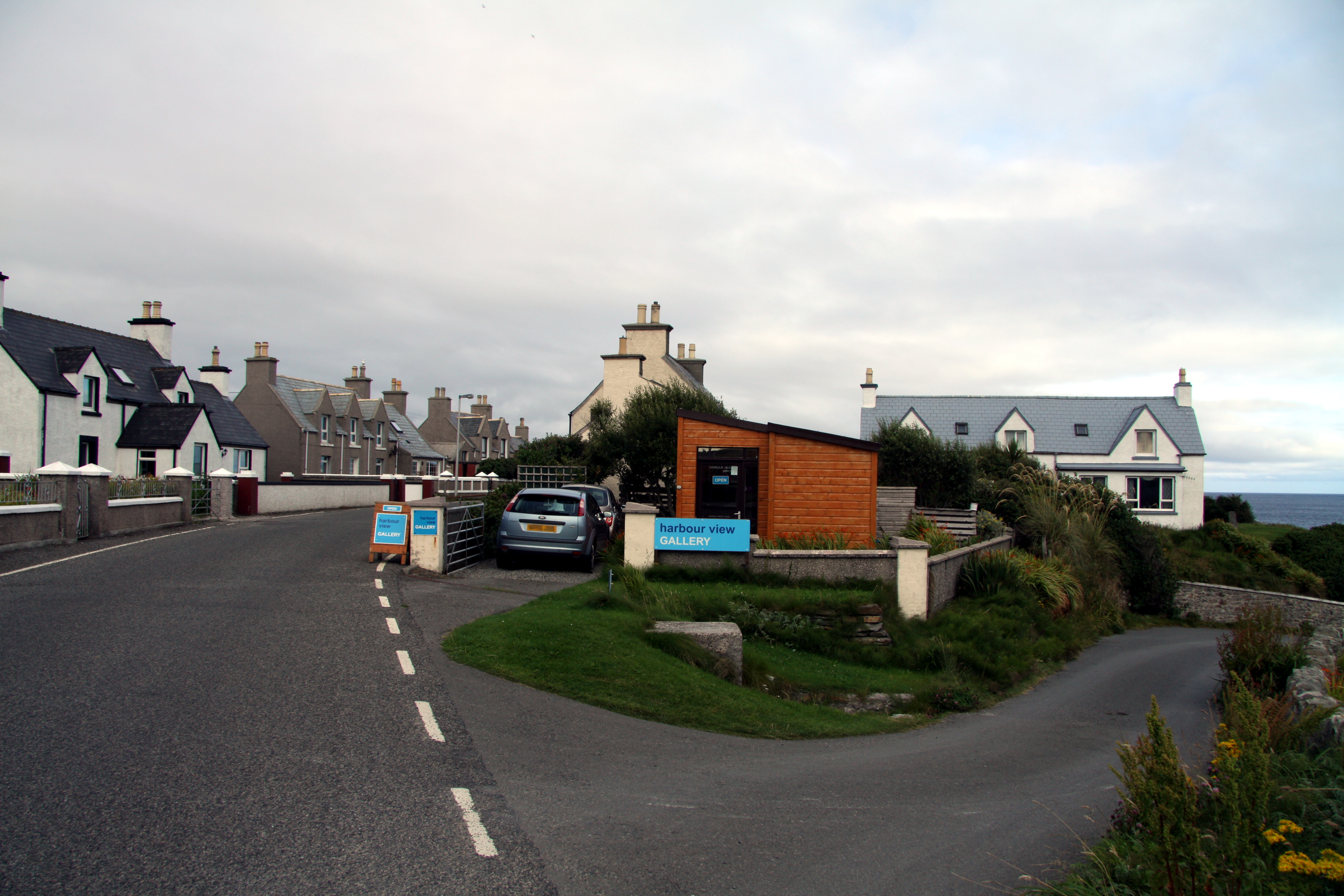

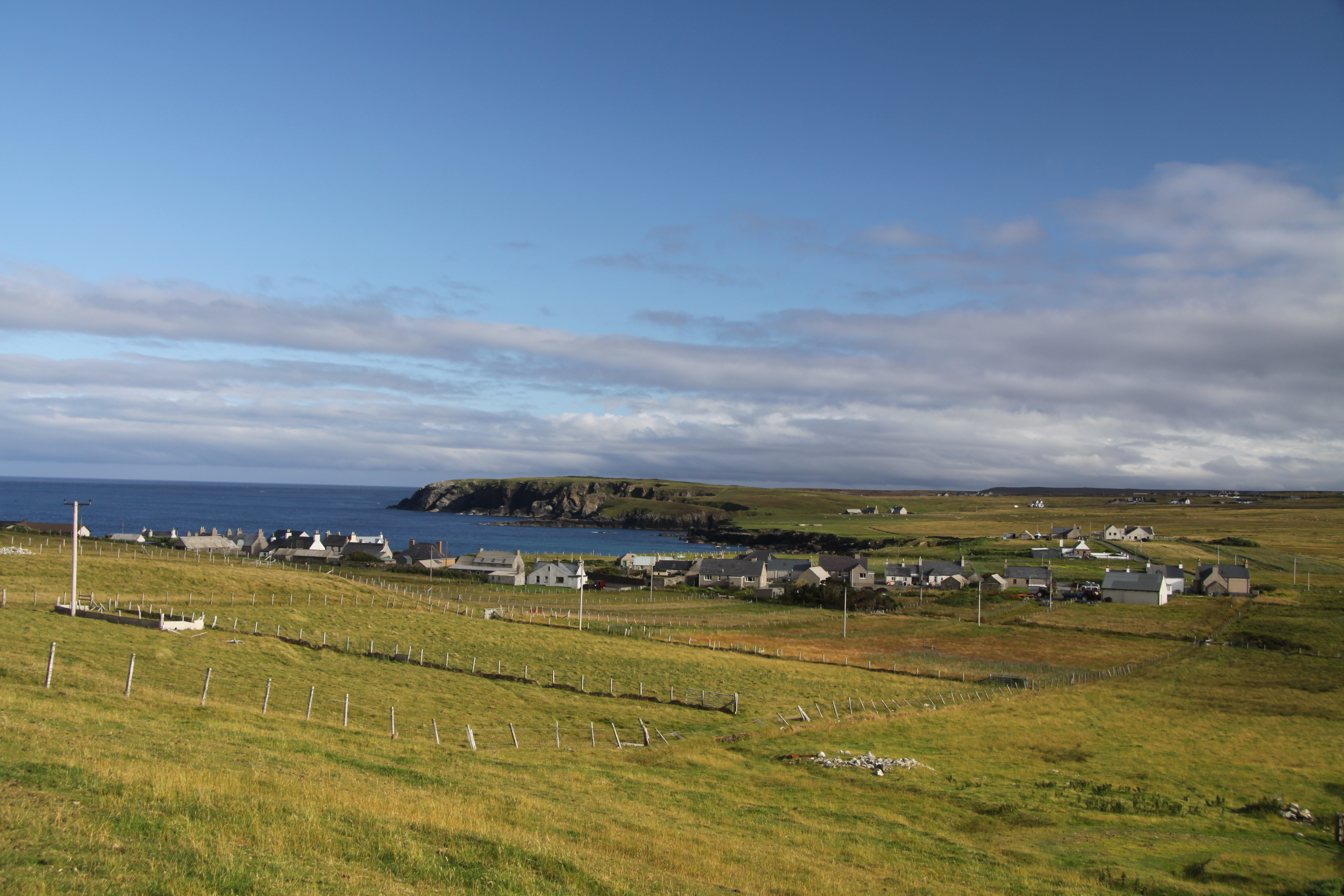
