= Barvas =

Settlement, community and civil parish on the Isle of Lewis in Scotland

Coordinates: 58.359°N 6.513°W

Barvas: Scottish Gaelic: Barabhas, Barbhas
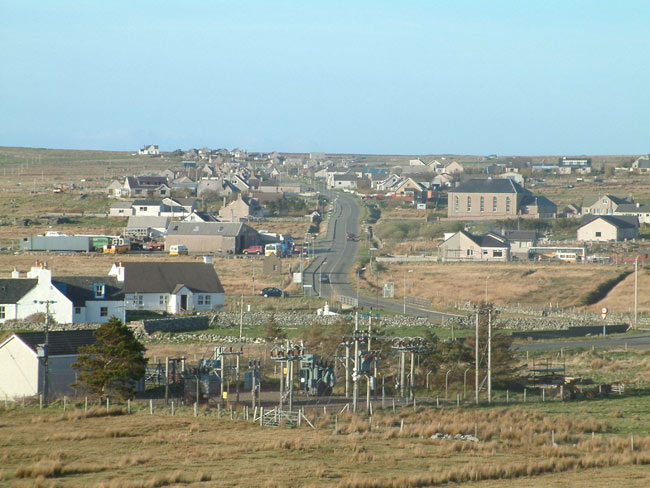
- Barabhas Uarach Upper Barvas

- Location within the Outer Hebrides
- Language: Scottish Gaelic; English
- OS grid reference: NB360499
- Civil parish: Barvas
- Council area: Na h-Eileanan Siar
- Lieutenancy area: Western Isles
- Country: Scotland
- Sovereign state: United Kingdom
- Post town: ISLE OF LEWIS
- Postcode district: HS2
- Dialling code: 01851
- Police: Scotland
- Fire: Scottish
- Ambulance: Scottish
- UK Parliament: Na h-Eileanan an Iar
- Scottish Parliament: Na h-Eileanan an Iar

Barvas (Scottish Gaelic: Barabhas or Barbhas, pronounced [baravəs]) is a settlement, community and civil parish on the Isle of Lewis in Scotland. It developed around a road junction. The A857 and A858 meet at the southern end of Barvas. North is the road to Ness; west takes the traveller to Carloway and the West Side; south runs the road to Stornoway. According to the 2011 Census it still had the highest concentration of Scottish Gaelic speakers in Scotland (64% of the population) with 2,037. This fell to 55% in 2022.

== Prehistory and Archaeology ==
Investigations since 1978 have found archaeological sites in the area that date from the Early Bronze Age to the Early Modern. Notable discoveries and projects:

- In 1986–7, there was the excavation of a small Bronze Age cemetery, which was inserted into the remains of an earlier Bronze Age building.
- In 1993, Richard Langhorne, curator of Museum nan Eilean in Stornoway, carried out an emergency excavation of a burial, dated to the late Iron Age.
- In the early summer of 1996, GUARD Archaeology excavated a further burial at Rudh a’Bhiogair, again en emergency excavation.
- Detailed surveys in both 1978 and 1999.
- Community excavations between 2000 and 2001 as part of the Barabhas Machair project - found a group of Iron Age ritual structures, including a long cist burial.
- 2001–13 Mark Elliott, conservator at Museum nan Eilean in Stornoway, with help from friends and family, carried out walkover surveys.

== History ==
Rev Allan MacArthur was minister of the Free Church in Barvas 1857 to 1887.

In the early 2000s, one of Europe's largest windfarms was planned for Barvas Moor. The Scottish Government rejected the proposals in early 2008.

== Teampall Mhuire ==
In Barvas is the ruins of Teampall Mhuire (St Mary's Church), currently buried next to the Cladh Mhuire. The exact location is currently unknown as it has been buried by sand. It was last visited by RCAHMS in the 1920s but by the 1960s the OS survey could not locate it. In the 1500s it was one of the four parish churches on Lewis and a letter from the Pope in 1403 mentioned the church so it is at least that old.
