= Morison =

Morison is a surname found in the English-speaking world. It is a variant form of Morrison. It was one of the original ways of spelling the name of the Clan Morrison, before Morrison with two r's became popular.

== People with this surname ==
- Alexander Morison (1779–1866), Scottish physician and alienist
- Barbara Morison, Australian radio broadcaster
- Catriona Morison (born 1986), Scottish mezzo-soprano
- Charles Morison (1861–1920), New Zealand barrister
- Donald Morison (1857–1924), lawyer, judge and politician in Newfoundland
- Douglas Morison (1814–1847), English painter
- Elsie Morison (1924–2016), Australian operatic soprano
- Elting E. Morison (1909–1995, Peterborough), American historian of technology
- George S. Morison (1842–1903), American engineer
- Harriet Morison (1862–1925), New Zealand suffragist and trade unionist
- Heather and Ivan Morison, Welsh artist duo
- Hector Morison (1850–1939), British stockbroker and Liberal Party politician
- Ian Morison (1943–2024), British astronomer and astrophysicist
- Louis Morison (born 2001), English footballer
- James Morison (physician) (1770–1840), British quack
- James Morison (evangelical) (1816–1893), Scottish cleric
- James Augustus Cotter Morison (1832–1888), English writer
- James Rutherford Morison (1853–1939), British surgeon
- Jock Morison (1914–1991), Australian rules footballer
- John Morison, 6th Baron of Bognie and Mountblairy (1757-1835), British politician
- John Morison (bacteriologist) (1879–1971), British physician
- John B. Morison (1923–1996), Ontario businessman and political figure
- Julia Morison (born 1952), New Zealand artist
- Kipling Gordon Morison, electrical engineer
- Malcolm Morison, Lord Morison (1931–2005), Scottish judge
- Mary Morison (1771–1791), supposed associate of the poet Robert Burns
- Margaret Pitt Morison (1900–1985), Australian architect
- Matthew Morison (born 1987), Canadian amateur snowboarder
- Odille Morison (1855–1933), Canadian linguist, collector and community leader
- Oscar Colin Morison (1884–1966), early English aviator
- Patricia Morison (1915-2018), American actress
- Robert Morison (1620–1683), Scottish botanist
- Roderick Morison, Scottish Gaelic poet and harpist, early 18th century
- Rona Morison, Scottish actress
- Rosa Morison, (1841–1912), British linguist and educationist
- Samuel Eliot Morison (1887–1976), American historian
- Samuel Loring Morison (born 1944), former American intelligence analyst
- Stanley Morison (1889–1967), British typographer, typographic theoretician and type designer
- Steve Morison (born 1983), Welsh footballer
- Theodore Morison (1863–1936), British educationalist
- Thomas Morison (physician) (c.1558–c.1603), Scottish physician and diplomat
- Thomas H. Morison (1838–1884), Warden of the Borough of Norwalk, Connecticut
- Thomas Morison, Lord Morison (1868–1945), Scottish politician and judge
- Walter Morison (1919–2009), Royal Air Force pilot
- William Morison (1663–1739), MP for Haddingtonshire and Peeblesshire
- Sir William Morison (1781–1851), MP for Clackmannanshire and Kinross-shire
- William Morison (minister) (1843–1937), Scottish clergyman and advocate

== See also ==
- Morison Zuill (1937–2023), Scottish cricketer
- Morrison (disambiguation)
