= John Morrison =

John (or Jack) Morrison or Morison may refer to:

== In politics ==
- John Morison (Banffshire MP) (c. 1757–1835), British MP for Banffshire
- John Morrison (blacksmith) (1726–1816), farmer, blacksmith and politician in Nova Scotia
- John Morison (Canadian politician) (1818–1873), Canadian businessman and political figure
- John Morrison (Manitoba politician) (1868–1930), politician in Manitoba, Canada
- John Morrison (Montana politician) (born 1961), politician in Montana, USA
- John Morrison (Saskatchewan politician) (1872–1950), Canadian Member of Parliament
- John Morrison, 1st Baron Margadale (1906–1996), British Conservative Party politician
- John Morrison, 2nd Viscount Dunrossil (1926–2000), British diplomat
- John Alexander Morrison (1814–1904), Pennsylvania Congressman
- John B. Morison (1923–1996), member of the Canadian House of Commons for Wentworth and Halton—Wentworth
- John Douglas Morrison (1934–2020), Australian police officer and mayor of Waverley
- John Gillis Morrison (1863–1917), politician in Nova Scotia, Canada
- John T. Morrison (1860–1915), Governor of Idaho
- John Morison Gibson (1842–1929), Canadian politician

== In sports ==
- Jack Morrison (rugby league) (John Harold Morrison, 1905–1994), Australian rugby league player
- John Morrison (Australian footballer) (born 1947), former Australian rules footballer
- John Morrison (basketball) (born 1945), American professional basketball player and college head coach
- John Morrison (chess player) (1889–1975), Canadian chess player
- John Morrison (cricketer) (born 1947), New Zealand cricketer and Wellington City Councillor
- John Morrison (footballer, born 1889) (1889–1972), Scottish footballer (Falkirk) and manager (Third Lanark, St Mirren)
- John Morrison (footballer, born 1909) (1909–1992), Scottish footballer (Celtic)
- John Morrison (ice hockey, born 1895) (1895–1956), ice hockey player
- John Morrison (ice hockey, born 1945), ice hockey player
- John Morrison (wrestler) (born 1979), ring name for professional wrestler, John Hennigan

== In literature ==
- John Morrison (writer) (1904–1998), Australian novelist and short story writer
- John L. Morrison (1863–1926), American journalist
- John Sinclair Morrison (1913–2000), British classicist and founder of the Trireme Trust

== In other fields ==
- John Morison (bacteriologist) (1879–1971), bacteriophage expert
- John Morrison (actor) (born 1962), American actor
- John Morrison (drummer), Australian jazz drummer
- John Morrison (intelligence officer) (born 1943), British intelligence officer
- John Morison (pastor) (sometimes spelt Morrison, 1791–1859), Congregational minister, London
- John Morrison (priest) (born 1938), Archdeacon of Oxford
- John Morrison (songwriter), 19th-century Tyneside songwriter
- John B. Morrison, United States Army general
- John Frank Morrison (1857–1932), American major general
- John G. Morrison (1842–1897), Irish-born navy man during the American Civil War
- John H. Morrison (born 1933), American lawyer
- John Howell Morrison (born 1956), American contemporary classical composer and educator
- John L. Morrison (pioneer) (1819–1899), pioneer to Oregon and namesake of Portland's Morrison Bridge
- John Lowrie Morrison (born 1948), Scottish contemporary artist
- John Robert Morrison (1814–1843), British translator, diplomat and missionary in the Far East
- John Stanton Fleming Morrison (1892–1961), British golf course architect
- John Todd Morrison (1863–1944), Scots-born physicist and meteorologist

== Fictional characters ==
- Soldier: 76 (Jack Francis Morrison), Overwatch character
- John Morrison, puppeteer for Dustin the Turkey

== See also ==
- Johnny Morrison (disambiguation)
