= Morrison =

Morrison may refer to:

== People ==
- Morrison (surname), people with the Scottish surname Morrison
- Morrison Heady (1829–1915), American poet
- Morrison Mann MacBride (1877–1938), Canadian merchant

== Places in the United States ==
- Morrison, Colorado
- Morrison, Illinois
- Morrison, Iowa
- Morrison, Missouri
- Morrison, Oklahoma
- Morrison, Tennessee
- Morrison, Wisconsin, a town
  - Morrison (community), Wisconsin, an unincorporated community
- Morrison County, Minnesota
- Morrison Township, Aitkin County, Minnesota

== Other uses ==
- Morrison (investment firm), a financial services company
- Clan Morrison, a Scottish clan
- Morrison Formation, a distinctive sequence of Upper Jurassic sedimentary rock in the western United States
- Morrison Hall, a residential hall at the University of Hong Kong
- Webb Horton House, now known as Morrison Hall
- Morrison Lake (disambiguation)
- Morrison, a 19th-century American merchant ship of the Morrison Incident
- USS Morrison (DD-560), a Fletcher-class destroyer sunk in the Pacific in 1945
- Verticordia nitens, a flowering plant commonly known as Morrison

== See also ==
- Morrison's (disambiguation)
- Morrisons, a chain of supermarkets in the United Kingdom
- Morison, a surname
- Morrisonia, genus of moths
- Morrisonville (disambiguation)
- Morrisson (disambiguation)
