= Bogniebrae =

Settlement in Aberdeenshire, Scotland

Coordinates: 57.49°N 02.68°W

Bogniebrae: Scottish Gaelic: Bognach
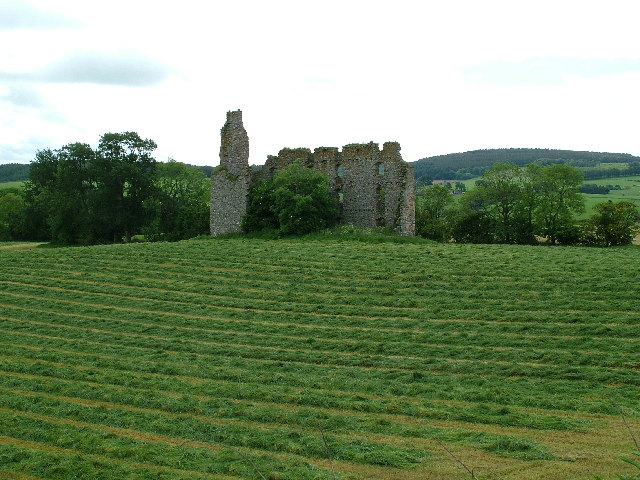
- Remains of Conzie or Bognie Castle, near Bogniebrae, built in the 1660s

- Location within Aberdeenshire
- OS grid reference: NJ5945
- Council area: Aberdeenshire
- Lieutenancy area: Aberdeenshire
- Country: Scotland
- Sovereign state: United Kingdom
- Police: Scotland
- Fire: Scottish
- Ambulance: Scottish
- UK Parliament: Gordon and Buchan
- Scottish Parliament: Aberdeenshire West

Bogniebrae (/ˌbɒɡniˈbreɪ/) is a small rural settlement in Aberdeenshire, Scotland. It is located at the junction of the A97 and B9001 roads, six miles (ten kilometres) from Huntly.

The Bognie Arms (a public house and hotel) is found at the junction, and is thought to have been built following the acquisition of the surrounding lands by the Morisons of Bognie in 1635. Thus, the building bears the heraldic insignia of the Baron of Bognie and Mountblairy.

The settlement also comprises Bognie Castle, thought to have been built by the Morisons of Bognie in the 1660s, a scheduled Neolithic stone circle (see Yonder Bognie), as well as several farms and houses (most of which lie within Bognie Estate).

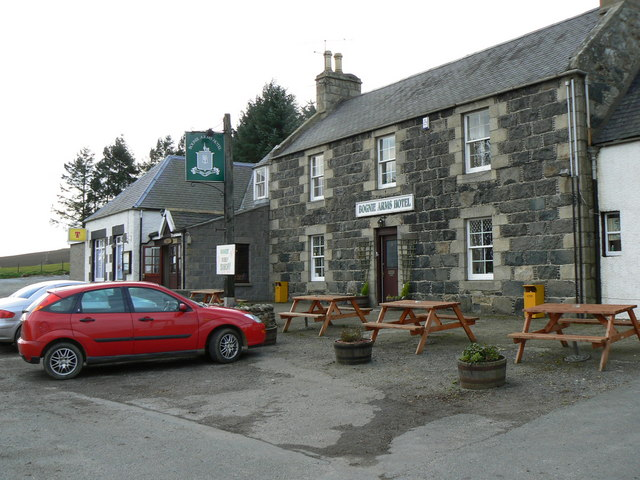
Bognie Arms public house and hotel
