= List of listed buildings in Forgue, Aberdeenshire =

This is a list of listed buildings in the parish of Forgue in Aberdeenshire, Scotland.

== List ==
| Name | Location | Date listed | Grid ref. (Note: Sometimes known as OSGB36, the grid reference (where provided) is based on the British national grid reference system used by the Ordnance Survey. • "Guide to National Grid". Ordnance Survey. • "Get-a-map". Ordnance Survey.) | Geo-coordinates | Notes | LB number (Note: Historic Environment Scotland assign a unique alphanumeric identifier to each designated site in Scotland, for listed buildings this always begins with "LB", for example "LB12345".) | Image |
|---|---|---|---|---|---|---|---|
| Templeland Farm House, near Largue | | | | 57°27′48″N 2°36′51″W | Category B | 9446 | Upload Photo |
| Corse House Farm, East Range | | | | 57°27′02″N 2°39′44″W | Category C(S) | 9451 | Upload Photo |
| Conzie Castle | | | | 57°29′36″N 2°40′39″W | Category B | 9454 | Upload Photo |
| Forgue, Former Parish Church, St Margaret's | | | | 57°29′40″N 2°39′03″W | Category B | 9456 | Upload another image See more images |
| Manse Of Forgue | | | | 57°29′49″N 2°39′09″W | Category B | 9458 | Upload Photo |
| Haddo House | | | | 57°30′17″N 2°38′13″W | Category C(S) | 9460 | Upload Photo |
| Placemill, Mill | | | | 57°28′34″N 2°37′29″W | Category B | 9464 | Upload Photo |
| Drumblair Lodge (Formerly Drumblair Cottage | | | | 57°28′24″N 2°36′46″W | Category B | 9467 | Upload Photo |
| Cobairdy House | | | | 57°28′53″N 2°42′34″W | Category B | 9453 | Upload Photo |
| Drumblair House | | | | 57°28′37″N 2°37′04″W | Category C(S) | 9465 | Upload Photo |
| Auchaber Manse | | | | 57°27′30″N 2°36′57″W | Category C(S) | 9448 | Upload Photo |
| Corse House, Gate-Piers At Cross Roads | | | | 57°26′57″N 2°39′37″W | Category B | 9452 | Upload Photo |
| Forgue Parish Hall (Scott's Hall), Including Gates, Gatepiers, Boundary Walls And Railings | | | | 57°29′27″N 2°38′52″W | Category C(S) | 47588 | Upload Photo |
| Colonel Shand's Monument Hawk Hill Plantation, Templeland | | | | 57°27′49″N 2°37′15″W | Category B | 9447 | Upload Photo |
| Old Manse Of Forgue Steading | | | | 57°29′50″N 2°39′11″W | Category C(S) | 9459 | Upload Photo |
| Boynsmill House | | | | 57°29′02″N 2°37′34″W | Category B | 9463 | Upload Photo |
| Mains Of Bognie, Farmhouse And Walled Garden | | | | 57°29′41″N 2°40′17″W | Category B | 9455 | Upload Photo |
| Frendraught House | | | | 57°27′56″N 2°38′01″W | Category A | 9449 | Upload Photo |
| Haddo House, Haddo Bridge Over Keithny Burn | | | | 57°30′18″N 2°38′12″W | Category B | 9462 | Upload Photo |
| Drumblair Dovecot | | | | 57°28′35″N 2°37′05″W | Category B | 9466 | Upload Photo |
| Corse House (Now Farmhouse; Part Divided Off As Separate Dwelling) | | | | 57°27′01″N 2°39′41″W | Category B | 9450 | Upload Photo |
| Forgue Parish Church - Churchyard | | | | 57°29′39″N 2°39′03″W | Category C(S) | 9457 | Upload Photo |
| St. Margaret's Episcopal Church, Forgue | | | | 57°29′24″N 2°38′58″W | Category C(S) | 9461 | Upload another image See more images |
| Glendronach Distillery, Kiln Range, Former Steading, West And South Bonded Warehouses, Offices And Dronach House | | | | 57°29′06″N 2°37′31″W | Category B | 46288 | Upload Photo |
| Huntly, Drumblade, Waddies Cottage | | | | 57°25′47″N 2°37′54″W | Category B | 49364 | Upload Photo |

== Key ==
The scheme for classifying buildings in Scotland is:

- Category A: "buildings of national or international importance, either architectural or historic; or fine, little-altered examples of some particular period, style or building type."
- Category B: "buildings of regional or more than local importance; or major examples of some particular period, style or building type, which may have been altered."
- Category C: "buildings of local importance; lesser examples of any period, style, or building type, as originally constructed or moderately altered; and simple traditional buildings which group well with other listed buildings."

In March 2016 there were 47,288 listed buildings in Scotland. Of these, 8% were Category A, and 50% were Category B, with the remaining 42% being Category C.

== See also ==
- List of listed buildings in Aberdeenshire
