= Fourman Hill =

Hill in Aberdeenshire, Scotland

Coordinates: 57.500°N 2.718°W

Fourman Hill is a hill located west of Bogniebrae, Aberdeenshire, Scotland.

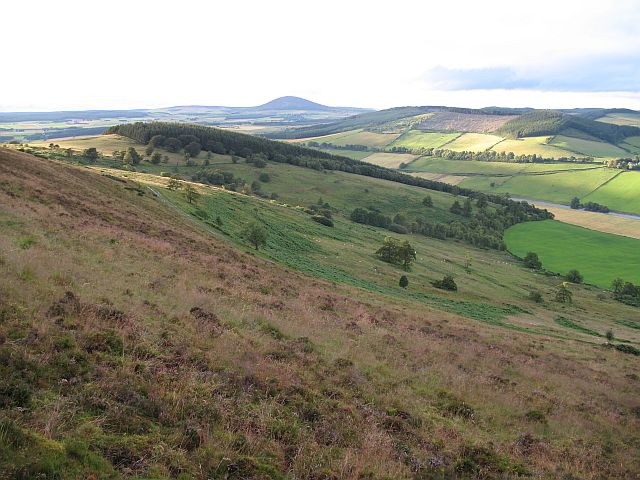
Northern slopes of Fourman Hill

It has an elevation of 1,127 feet (344 m). A cairn near the summit marked the historical boundary of Rothiemay and Huntly parishes. The summit of Fourman Hill also marks the highest point on Bognie Estate, held by the Morisons of Bognie since 1635.

A pretty eminent hill so called from the fact that it is the property of four Proprietors all of which, it is said, could dine on one table on the top of the hill and each proprietor seated on his own land.

— George Rose, Civil Assistant, Ordnance Survey Name Books 1865-1871: Aberdeenshire volume 40

There is a possible site of a Roman Camp on the hill. Suggestions of a Roman road were thought to be unlikely: "There are faint traces of an old road on the Fourman Hill in this Parish which is supposed to be the Roman Road which led between the Camp on the Spey and the Camp near Glenmellan in Forgue parish, the traces in this parish resemble rather those of an old bridle road than a Roman Road being only about ten to twenty links wide & crooked, no other traces whatever are visible along its supposed course in Huntly parish."
