= Fourman =

Fourman may refer to:

- Fourman Hill
- Michael Fourman
