= STAGEStheatre =

Coordinates: 33.87007°N 117.91706°W

STAGEStheatre was a 501(c)(3) non-profit theater located in Fullerton, California. It was the oldest storefront theatre in Orange County, and had mounted hundreds of productions, including American classics, comedies, dramas, Shakespeare, absurdist, avant-garde, and original plays.

== History ==
STAGEStheatre was founded in 1992 by Brian Kojac. At first, it was a small space for actors to work on their craft. The theatre had drawn on the talents of many students (and former students), college faculty and arts administrators in Orange County's three high schools, community college and university. Over time STAGEStheatre developed into a well-known Orange County artistic venue.

In 1993, STAGEStheatre began producing shows in an industrial complex in Northeast Anaheim. Kojac named the theatre “STAGES;” alluding to the stages one goes through in life. A year later, after forty-one productions, the theatre expanded to a second space next door to the Anaheim location. It was at this time the theatre began to produce late night productions, in addition to the regular primetime season.

By 1997, the theatre had produced 112 productions; more than 90 were original works. Two years later, STAGEStheatre graduated from its self-described “underground, indie” status and moved to the storefront occupying at 400 East Commonwealth Avenue.

In 2004, the theatre achieved non-profit status, under the direction of Patrick Gwlatney as Managing Artistic Director, and changed its name to STAGEStheatre. The theatre was operated by volunteers, and was run by a Board of Directors, led by an artistic director and executive director.

STAGEStheatre would permanently close its doors at its Fullerton location in 2020, due to lacking revenue because of the COVID-19 pandemic.

Spectacles Improv Engine was an improvisation group that performed regularly at the theatre, conducting improv classes during the day and organizing the charity fundraiser Orange County Improv Cup and the Orange County Improv Festival. In late 2012, Spectacles broke the record for Longest Improv Scene by performing for 25 continuous hours.
