= Morrison's =

Morrison's or Morrisons may refer to:

- Morrisons, a chain of supermarkets in the United Kingdom
- Morrisons, New Zealand, a settlement in Otago, New Zealand
- Morrison's Academy, a Scottish school in Crieff, Perth and Kinross
- Morrison's Cafeteria, a southeastern United States restaurant chain
- Morrisons Cove, a valley in Pennsylvania, United States
- Morrison's Haven, a Scottish harbour in East Lothian
- Morrisons Hill, New South Wales, a former railway halt in Australia

== See also ==
- Morrison (disambiguation)
- Morrisson (disambiguation)
