= Hugh Stewart =

Hugh Stewart may refer to:

- Hugh Stewart (film editor) (1910–2011), British film editor and producer
- Sir Hugh Stewart, 2nd Baronet (1792–1854), MP for Tyrone 1830–1835
- Hugh Stewart (cricketer) (1907–1995), Scottish cricketer
- Hugh Stewart (Canadian politician), member for Comox in the Legislative Assembly of British Columbia, 1916–1920
- Hugh Stewart (tennis) (1928–2024), American tennis player
- Hugh Stewart (sport shooter), Northern Ireland sport shooter
- Hugh Alexander Stewart (1871–1956), Canadian politician
- Hugh Fraser Stewart (1863–1948), British academic, churchman and literary critic
- Hugh Stewart (classical scholar) (1884–1934), New Zealand university professor, classicist, military leader and historian
