= George Thom =

Scottish mathematician and pedagogue

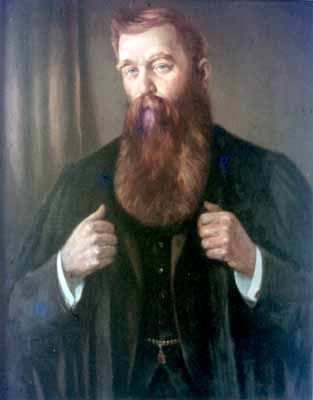
- Born: 2 July 1842; Forgue (Huntly), Aberdeenshire, Scotland
- Died: 20 December 1916 (aged 74); Aberdeen, Scotland
- Resting place: Dollar Churchyard (Clackmannanshire, Scotland); 56.163675°N 3.669141°W
- Education: University of Aberdeen
- Scientific career
- Fields: Mathematics
- Workplaces: Dollar Academy

George Thom (2 July 1842–20 December 1916) was a Scottish mathematician and pedagogue who was principal at Dollar Academy from 1878 to 1902.

== Life and work ==
Thom graduated from the University of Aberdeen in 1863. In 1867 he became Principal of Doveton College in Madras, India and he remained there till 1876, when he returned to Scotland as Vice-Principal of Chanonry School Aberdeen. In 1878 he was appointed Rector of Dollar Institution (later to become Dollar Academy). He held this post for 24 years, till his retirement in 1902. He was a founder member of the Edinburgh Mathematical Society in 1883 and became its fifth President in 1886. In 1887 the University of St Andrews conferred on him the degree of Doctor of Laws

He wrote a number of standard class-books on mathematics, botany, physiology, and other subjects.

== Bibliography ==
- Anonymous (1917). "Obituary of Gorge Thom". The Aberdeen University Review. 4: 186.
