= John Archibald Watt Dollar =

John Archibald Watt Dollar FRSE (28 November 1866 – 11 November 1947) was a British veterinary surgeon. He served as President of the Royal College of Veterinary Surgeons 1904–05. He was an important and influential author of many veterinary textbooks.

He held a Royal Warrant for four consecutive British monarchs, granting him as personal vet to the animals (especially horses) of Queen Victoria, King Edward VII, King George V and King George VI.

== Biography ==
He was born on 28 November 1866 in Lewisham in Kent the son of Thomas Aitkin Dollar (1833–1909), veterinary surgeon, of Kirkintilloch in Scotland. His father owned a high class veterinary surgery in New Bond Street in London. John was (appropriately) sent to Dollar Academy in central Scotland for his education. He then attended the Clydesdale College in Hamilton and the Royal College of Veterinary Surgeons in London becoming a fellow in 1887, aged only 21.

On qualifying he pursued a series of prestigious posts across Europe, notably under Prof Robert Koch at Berlin University in 1889. He then worked in the Pasteur Institute in Paris and the Veterinary School in Alfort. He then joined his father's practice on New Bond Street in London, where his brother William Dollar also worked. In 1902 he was elected a Fellow of the Royal Society of Edinburgh. His proposers were James More, Sir John McFadyean, Sir German Sims Woodhead, and Sir Edward Albert Sharpey-Schafer.

Dollar served on the RCVS Council from 1894 until 1909 including a year as president. He was made an Honorary Fellow in 1940. During his presidency he had a new gold chain of office created and wore this at official ceremonies. At the end of his presidency he gifted this to the college. His portrait (in full regalia) was painted during his presidency. In April 1939 he gifted this to the college.

He died on 11 November 1947.

== Personal life ==
In 1907 he married Violet Smart Hammond. The following year they had a child: Archibald Thomas John Dollar (1908–1981) who became a celebrated geologist.

== Publications ==
Dollar was Editor of The Veterinarian journal until its demise in 1902.

- A Handbook of Horse-Shoeing (1898)
- An Atlas of Veterinary Surgical Operations (1899)
- The Practise of Veterinary Surgery (1900)
- A Surgical Operating Table for a Horse (1900)
- Studies in Clinical Veterinary Medicine and Surgery (1900)
- Regional Veterinary Surgery and Operative Technique (1912)
- Veterinary Surgery (1912) translated from German (original by John Moller)
- Veterinary Surgery: General, Operative and Regional (4 editions) (1938)
