= Ythanwells =

Coordinates: 57.435°N 2.610°W

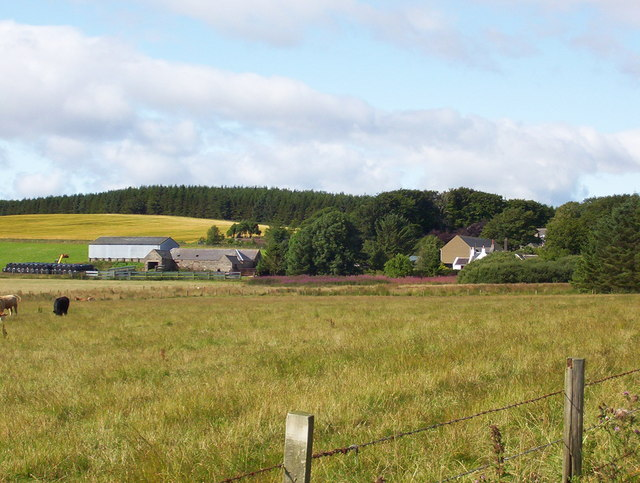
- Ythanwells

- Location within Aberdeenshire
- OS grid reference: NJ634384
- Council area: Aberdeenshire
- Lieutenancy area: Aberdeenshire
- Country: Scotland
- Sovereign state: United Kingdom
- Post town: HUNTLY
- Postcode district: AB54
- Dialling code: 01464
- Police: Scotland
- Fire: Scottish
- Ambulance: Scottish
- UK Parliament: Gordon and Buchan
- Scottish Parliament: Aberdeenshire West

Ythanwells (/ˌaɪθənˈwɛlz/) is a village in the Marr area of Aberdeenshire, Scotland, lying 10.6 kilometres (6.6 mi) east of Huntly and south of Largue. The village is sometimes known as Wells of Ythan, although this name strictly refers to the nearby source of the River Ythan.

Ythanwells Church, now semi-derelict and in use as an agricultural barn, was built in 1864. The village also formerly had a school, which serves today as a community centre. Ythanwells now comes under the catchment area for Drumblade Primary School.

The Roman Camp site known as Ythan Wells or Glenmailen is situated near the farm of Glenmellan, 2.1 kilometres (1.3 mi) east of the village.
