= Archibald Thomas John Dollar =

English geologist

Dr Archibald Thomas John Dollar FRSE FGS MIMM (18 May 1908 – 24 November 1981) was an English geologist and seismologist. He was Head of Geology at Birkbeck College in London and had a particular interest in both vulcanology and seismology. In papers and books he is usually referred to as A. T. J. Dollar. The hill range Dollartoppen on the Arctic island Jan Mayen is named after Dollar. The National Seismological Archive (NSA) hold a large collection of Dollar's personal artefacts jointly known as the ATJ Dollar Collection.

== Life ==
He was born on 18 May 1908 the son of John Archibald Watt Dollar FRSE (1866–1947) an eminent veterinarian.

Archibald attended St Paul's School in London. He then studied geology at King's College London, graduating BSc in 1931, before continuing to Emmanuel College, Cambridge for postgraduate studies under Cecil Edgar Tilley, gaining a PhD in 1935.

In the Second World War he began as a Scientific Officer in the Ministry of Supply and as a Radio Maintenance officer in the Royal Army Ordnance Corps. He was promoted to 2nd Lieutenant in 1942. In 1944 he became Commanding Officer of the army unit working on Quartz oscillator plates in India. After the war, he returned to the post of Lecturer in Geology at Glasgow University which he had begun only shortly before the war. In 1948 he was promoted to Senior Petrologist. In 1950 he moved to Birkbeck College in London and remained there for the remainder of his working life rising to Head of Geology. He was elected a Fellow of the Royal Society of Edinburgh in 1940. His proposers were John Archibald Watt Dollar (his father), George Walter Tyrrell, Sir Arthur Trueman, and John Weir.

From 1947 to 1959 he carried out various explorations in northern Norwegian and Arctic lands. He served as Vice President of the Geologists Association (UK).

He died on 24 November 1981.

== Family ==
He was married with three children, all living at Caterham in Surrey.

== Publications ==
- An Integrating Micrometer for the Geometrical Analysis of Rocks (1937)
- The Lundy Complex: Its Petrology and Tectonics (1941)
- Catalogue of Scottish Earthquakes, 1916–1949 (1950)
- The First Book of Caves (1964) with Elizabeth Hamilton
