= Iain Anderson (businessman) =

Scottish cricketer and business executive (born 1931)

Personal information
- Full name: Iain Mair Anderson
- Born: 11 May 1931 (age 95); Ballygunge, Bengal Presidency, British India
- Batting: Right-handed
- Bowling: Right-arm fast-medium

Domestic team information
- Years: Team
- 1951–1953: Scotland

Career statistics
Competition	First-class
Matches	5
Runs scored	114
Batting average	14.25
100s/50s	–/–
Top score	40
Catches/stumpings	2/–
- Source: ESPNcricinfo, 13 June 2022

Iain Mair Anderson (born 11 May 1931) is a Scottish former first-class cricketer and automotive industry executive.

The son of Ian Hoyle Anderson, he was born in British India at Ballygunge in May 1931. He was educated in Scotland at the Dollar Academy, before matriculating to the University of Edinburgh where he studied accountancy. A club cricketer for Kelburne Cricket Club, Anderson made his debut in first-class cricket for Scotland against Worcestershire at Dundee in 1951, with him making a further four first-class appearances for Scotland to 1953. Anderson scored 114 runs in his five matches at an average of 14.25, with a highest score of 40 which he made on debut.

Anderson emigrated to Canada in 1954, where he was employed until 1955 by the Boynton Acceptance Company. He then began his career in the automotive industry, being employed in various financial, manufacturing and purchasing positions by the Ford Motor Company. In 1963, he moved to the United States to work for American Motors, eventually becoming their vice president of finance, and later the executive vice president of the company. In 1978, Anderson joined Volkswagen, where he was their executive vice president of finance and administration in North America.
