= Yonder Bognie =

Stone circle in Aberdeenshire, Scotland

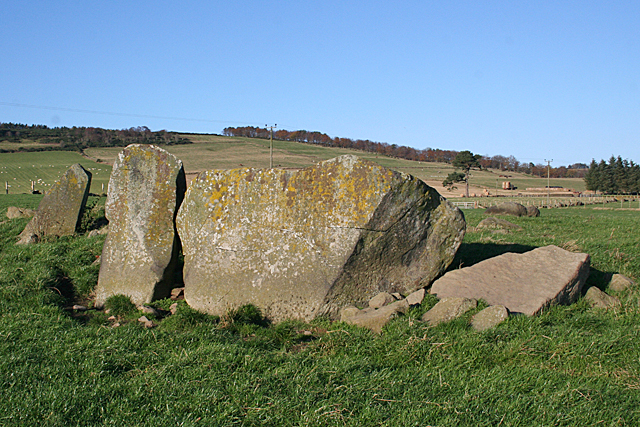
- The recumbent photographed in 2015
- Interactive map of Yonder Bognie
- 57.499°N 2.669°W
- Type: Recumbent stone circle
- Location: Scotland, United Kingdom

Site notes
- Material: Stone
- Public access: Yes

Scheduled monument
- Official name: Yonder Bognie stone circle
- Type: Prehistoric ritual and funerary: stone circle or ring
- Designated: 17 August 1925
- Reference no.: SM56

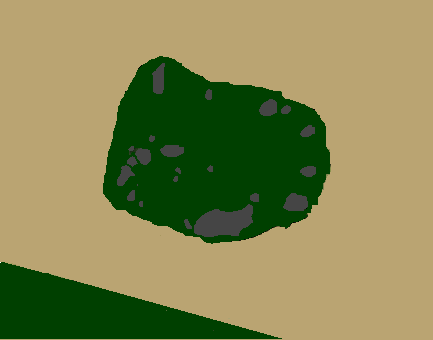
Yonder Bognie Stone Circle, enhanced from a satellite view

Yonder Bognie is a recumbent stone circle near Forgue in Aberdeenshire, Scotland.

== Recumbent stone circles ==
A recumbent stone circle is a type of stone circle constructed in the early Bronze Age. The identifying feature is that the largest stone (the recumbent) is always laid horizontally, with its long axis generally aligned with the perimeter of the ring between the south and southwest. A flanker stone stands each side of the recumbent and these are typically the tallest stones in the circle, with the smallest being situated on the northeastern aspect. The rest of the circle is usually composed of between six and ten orthostats graded by size. The builders tended to select a site which was on a level spur of a hill with excellent views to other landmarks. Over seventy of these circles are found in lowland Aberdeenshire in northeast Scotland – the most similar monuments are the axial stone circles of southwest Ireland. Recumbent stone circles generally enclosed a low ring cairn, though over the millennia these have often disappeared. They may have been a development from the Clava cairns found nearby in Inverness-shire and axial stone circles may have followed the design. Whilst cremated remains have been found at some sites, the precise function of these circles is not known.

== Description ==
Yonder Bognie is located near Forgue in Aberdeenshire. The monument is in ruined state. Whilst it has been suggested by Alexander Thom that there were two circles, if there was one it was an oval shape between 18 and 22 metres wide. Nine of the original stones remain, three are fallen. The recumbent is 3.35 metres long and 1.70 metres high. It appears to be aligned with the Foudland Hills. The western flanker stands at 1.75 metres. The circle is located in an agricultural field under private ownership and is a scheduled monument.
