= Morrisonville, Illinois =

Morrisonville
- Village
- Nickname: Motown
- Motto: "Where progress meets the prairie."
- Location of Morrisonville in Christian County, Illinois.
- Coordinates: 39°25′18″N 89°27′32″W
- Country: United States
- State: Illinois
- County: Christian
- Township: Ricks
- Founded: 1869
- Incorporated: May 1872

Government
  - Type: Village
  - Mayor: Larry Tolliver

Area
  - Total: 1.03 sq mi (2.68 km^{2})
  - Land: 1.03 sq mi (2.68 km^{2})
  - Water: 0 sq mi (0.00 km^{2})
- Elevation: 620 ft (190 m)

Population (2020)
  - Total: 997
  - Density: 963.5/sq mi (372.02/km^{2})
- Time zone: UTC-6 (CST)
  - Summer (DST): UTC-5 (CDT)
- ZIP code: 62546
- Area code: 217
- FIPS code: 17-50543
- GNIS ID: 2399398

Morrisonville is a small town in Christian County, Illinois, United States. The population was 997 at the 2020 census.

== History ==
Morrisonville is a small, rural town in Central Illinois. It is located 45 miles (72 km) south of the state's capital, Springfield. Morrisonville has a rich history dating back to a time when it was used as a hunting ground for Native American Indians.

Before settlers established a town, four Indian tribes lived on Morrisonville's land, the Sac, Fox, Pottawatomie, and Kickapoo. They competed with each other for buffalo, elk, and deer. Morrisonville was also part of the Black Hawk hunting ground.

Since 1492, six flags have flown over what is now Morrisonville, including Spain, France, Great Britain, Virginia, Indiana, and Illinois. Germans have also settled in this area. The Marsch's and Millburgs were directly from Germany and settled there.

The town was incorporated under the general city and village law in May 1872. The first board of trustees consisted of the following: C.M. Leiberman, Dr. C. Voorhees, W.T. Ricks, E.S. Shull, and J.R. Hall. Siras Irion was police magistrate.

There were a few events that led up to this, such as on June 14, 1851, when Thomas Carlin, a former governor of Illinois, paid $1.25 an acre for land that is now Morrisonville, and in the fall of 1869, when Colonel James Morrison laid out the plat for the town. Colonel Morrison married Mary Ann Carlin in 1842. Mary Ann Carlin's parents were Thomas A. Carlin and Rebecca Huitt Carlin. (Thomas Carlin established the town of Carrollton, Illinois, and the town of Carlinville is named in his honor.)

After Carlin purchased the land, he left it to his daughter, and she left it to her husband, Morrison, and then, when the town was established, it was named after him. In fact, on Perrine Street, there is still a house that Colonel Morrison built and lived in with his wife after the town of Morrisonville was established. Col. Morrison made an agreement with the railroad company that he would help build a new town if the railroad company would make Morrisonville a regular place to stop.

Even though the town was named after Morrison, Joseph Poggenpohl built the first house in the Morrisonville area in February 1870. Then, in May of the same year, the railroad was laid diagonally through Morrisonville. Once the railroad was established, Morrisonville became a regular stopping place for all trains and passengers. As soon as this happened, the town grew in population and business. After the first resident in the town proper, Richard McLean, built his house, people came here looking for a better living.

Since 1871, many land additions have been annexed to this town, such as T.F. Potts, Perrine, Johnson, Pence, Cloyd, and Shull. All of these streets were named after people who loved the land of Morrisonville and wanted to see it grow and prosper. Since its founding in 1872, people have found many ways to socialize, learn, live, and make a living in Morrisonville.

The first Morrisonville picnic was held on August 27, 1923, and it included a parade beginning on Sarpy Street, and marching to the City Park, speakers, a $1.00 prize for the tallest and shortest man, a fat man race, and free movies shown. Many people attended the event, as they still do today. It also includes the world's largest bull frog jumping contest.

A craze that hit Morrisonville in the mid-1880s was roller skating. In fact, it was so popular a building was built just for roller skating. It was later used as the Knights of Columbus hall. In 1926, the Knights of Columbus purchased the “Opera House” from the Morrisonville Moose Lodge. Many activities were held there, including dances, card parties, talent shows, church bazaar, and roller-skating.

Ever since the 1920s, the local lumber company (Morrisonville Lumber Company) has remained in the same location, and fire has destroyed two office buildings; one in the early 1920s, and one in 1974.

Through the years, Morrisonville has been known as a very religious community. Some churches in Morrisonville are the First Baptist Church, the First United Presbyterian Church, St. Maurice Church, and the United Methodist Church. Colonel Morrison donated the land for St. Maurice. The first church was a large frame building on the corner of Fuller and Third Streets, and costed $4,000.

In 1870, the first school was built. It also served as a Sunday school and a town hall. The present St. Maurice School was built in 1922, and contained a full basement and a large room across the entire front of the school. “Country children would drive a horse and buggy to school.”

Some of the first businesses to open in Morrisonville that are still open today are Becker's Clothing Store and Morrisonville Lumber Company.

When Morrisonville abandoned the old Village Hall/firehouse, the Morrisonville Historical Society was organized in an effort to raise funds for preservation of this historic building, and renovate it for a museum. They housed artifacts such as old clothing, dolls and doll furniture, a collection of typewriters, old school and business pictures, sports memorabilia, and Morrisonville's first jail cell.

== Geography ==
According to the 2021 census gazetteer files, Morrisonville has a total area of 1.04 square miles (2.69 km^{2}), all land.

=== Climate ===
According to the Köppen Climate Classification system, Morrisonville has a humid subtropical climate, abbreviated "Cfa" on climate maps. The hottest temperature recorded in Morrisonville was 111 °F (43.9 °C) on July 14, 1936, while the coldest temperature recorded was −29 °F (−33.9 °C) on February 12, 1899.

Climate data for Morrisonville, Illinois, 1991–2020 normals, extremes 1895–present
Month	Jan	Feb	Mar	Apr	May	Jun	Jul	Aug	Sep	Oct	Nov	Dec	Year
Record high °F (°C)	73 (23)	78 (26)	94 (34)	92 (33)	98 (37)	104 (40)	111 (44)	108 (42)	104 (40)	95 (35)	83 (28)	73 (23)	111 (44)
Mean maximum °F (°C)	58.2 (14.6)	62.3 (16.8)	73.2 (22.9)	82.8 (28.2)	88.8 (31.6)	93.1 (33.9)	94.2 (34.6)	94.3 (34.6)	92.0 (33.3)	85.8 (29.9)	72.0 (22.2)	60.4 (15.8)	96.7 (35.9)
Mean daily maximum °F (°C)	35.6 (2.0)	40.8 (4.9)	51.8 (11.0)	65.1 (18.4)	75.0 (23.9)	83.2 (28.4)	86.4 (30.2)	85.5 (29.7)	80.7 (27.1)	68.1 (20.1)	52.7 (11.5)	40.7 (4.8)	63.8 (17.7)
Daily mean °F (°C)	27.5 (−2.5)	32.0 (0.0)	41.9 (5.5)	53.9 (12.2)	64.7 (18.2)	73.2 (22.9)	76.0 (24.4)	74.5 (23.6)	68.1 (20.1)	55.9 (13.3)	42.8 (6.0)	32.6 (0.3)	53.6 (12.0)
Mean daily minimum °F (°C)	19.2 (−7.1)	23.2 (−4.9)	32.1 (0.1)	42.8 (6.0)	54.3 (12.4)	63.2 (17.3)	65.7 (18.7)	63.5 (17.5)	55.6 (13.1)	43.8 (6.6)	33.0 (0.6)	24.5 (−4.2)	43.4 (6.3)
Mean minimum °F (°C)	−4.3 (−20.2)	3.3 (−15.9)	13.7 (−10.2)	27.7 (−2.4)	39.3 (4.1)	48.7 (9.3)	53.7 (12.1)	52.3 (11.3)	37.6 (3.1)	27.1 (−2.7)	17.1 (−8.3)	4.0 (−15.6)	−7.6 (−22.0)
Record low °F (°C)	−28 (−33)	−29 (−34)	−12 (−24)	15 (−9)	28 (−2)	38 (3)	44 (7)	41 (5)	24 (−4)	15 (−9)	−4 (−20)	−21 (−29)	−29 (−34)
Average precipitation inches (mm)	2.18 (55)	1.82 (46)	2.73 (69)	4.31 (109)	4.55 (116)	3.92 (100)	2.95 (75)	3.50 (89)	3.53 (90)	3.21 (82)	3.20 (81)	2.22 (56)	38.12 (968)
Average snowfall inches (cm)	5.9 (15)	3.9 (9.9)	2.4 (6.1)	0.0 (0.0)	0.0 (0.0)	0.0 (0.0)	0.0 (0.0)	0.0 (0.0)	0.0 (0.0)	0.2 (0.51)	0.6 (1.5)	3.2 (8.1)	16.2 (41.11)
Average precipitation days (≥ 0.01 in)	7.4	7.2	8.7	10.4	11.0	9.1	7.4	7.2	6.5	8.5	8.3	7.9	99.6
Average snowy days (≥ 0.1 in)	2.5	2.1	1.0	0.0	0.0	0.0	0.0	0.0	0.0	0.0	0.4	1.7	7.7
Source 1: NOAA
Source 2: National Weather Service

== Demographics ==
Historical population
Census	Pop.	Note	%±
1870	128		—
1880	593		363.3%
1890	844		42.3%
1900	934		10.7%
1910	1,200		28.5%
1920	1,183		−1.4%
1930	1,166		−1.4%
1940	1,149		−1.5%
1950	1,132		−1.5%
1960	1,115		−1.5%
1970	1,165		4.5%
1980	1,148		−1.5%
1990	1,113		−3.0%
2000	1,068		−4.0%
2010	1,056		−1.1%
2020	997		−5.6%
U.S. Decennial Census

As of the 2020 census there were 997 people, 439 households, and 315 families residing in the village. The population density was 963.29 inhabitants per square mile (371.93/km^{2}). There were 446 housing units at an average density of 430.92 per square mile (166.38/km^{2}). The racial makeup of the village was 94.98% White, 0.20% African American, 0.10% Native American, 0.20% from other races, and 4.51% from two or more races. Hispanic or Latino of any race were 1.71% of the population.

There were 439 households, out of which 29.8% had children under the age of 18 living with them, 58.31% were married couples living together, 10.25% had a female householder with no husband present, and 28.25% were non-families. 25.28% of all households were made up of individuals, and 11.16% had someone living alone who was 65 years of age or older. The average household size was 2.93 and the average family size was 2.56.

The village's age distribution consisted of 27.4% under the age of 18, 7.2% from 18 to 24, 23.4% from 25 to 44, 25.9% from 45 to 64, and 16.2% who were 65 years of age or older. The median age was 37.0 years. For every 100 females, there were 101.3 males. For every 100 females age 18 and over, there were 102.7 males.

The median income for a household in the village was $64,219, and the median income for a family was $77,847. Males had a median income of $50,078 versus $30,500 for females. The per capita income for the village was $31,368. About 5.4% of families and 9.0% of the population were below the poverty line, including 21.9% of those under age 18 and 6.6% of those age 65 or over.

== Notable people ==
- Wayne Rosenthal, state of Illinois official (Illinois Department of Natural Resources)
- Al Unser, catcher for the Detroit Tigers and Cincinnati Reds
- A. H. "Gus" Belt, founder of Steak 'n Shake
