= Alexander Leith (British Army officer) =

Scottish officer (1774–1859)

General Sir Alexander Leith KCB
- Born: 1 December 1774; Forgue, Aberdeenshire, Scotland
- Died: 19 February 1859 (aged 84); Freefield, Aberdeenshire, Scotland
- Burial place: Towie, Aberdeenshire
- Military career
- Allegiance: United Kingdom
- Branch: British Army
- Service years: 1792–1859
- Rank: General
- Conflicts: French Revolutionary Wars; Flanders Campaign; West Indies Campaign; Invasion of St Lucia; Anglo-Russian Invasion of Holland; Battle of Alkmaar (WIA); Napoleonic Wars; Alexandra Expedition; Battle of Rosetta; Peninsular War; Battle of Vitoria; Battle of the Pyrenees; Battle of Nivelle; Battle of the Nive (WIA); Battle of Garris; Battle of Orthez; Battle of Toulouse
- Awards: Army Gold Cross

General Sir Alexander Leith KCB (1 December 1774 – 19 February 1859) was a Scottish officer in the British Army.

He was born in Cobardie, Forgue, Aberdeenshire, Scotland, the son of Alexander Leith of Freefield & Glenkindie and Mary Elizabeth Gordon.

He joined the British Army as an ensign in August 1792 and was made first a lieutenant and then captain in 1794. He was present with the 42nd Foot at the defence of Nieuwpoort, Flanders in 1794 and with the 31st Foot at the capture of St Lucia. He lost an eye at the Battle of Alkmaar in 1799.

He was promoted to major in 1804 and served in Egypt in 1807, including at the attack on Rosetta. Raised to lieutenant-colonel in 1811 and transferred in 1812 to the Iberian peninsula to fight in the Peninsular War, he commanded the 31st Foot at the Battle of Vittoria, the Battle of the Pyrenees and the Battle of Nive, where he was severely wounded at St Pierre. He was afterwards involved at the Battles of Orthez and Toulouse in 1814. He was knighted KCB in 1815.

He was promoted major-general in 1830 and lieutenant-general in 1841. In 1841 he was given the Colonelcy of the 90th Regiment of Foot (Perthshire Volunteers), which he held until offered the Colonelcy of his old regiment, the 31st (Huntingdonshire) Regiment of Foot, in 1853, which he then held until his death. He was made a full general on 20 June 1854.

He died in Aberdeenshire in 1859. He had married twice; firstly Maria Thorp, with whom he had a large family, and secondly Mary Mackenzie. He was succeeded by his son Alexander Leith of Glenkindie, another son Robert became a general of the Army and his son James won the VC during the Indian Mutiny.

Military offices
Preceded by Sir Henry Trevor, 21st Baron Dacre	Colonel of the 31st (Huntingdonshire) Regiment of Foot; 1853–1859	Succeeded by Sir Patrick Edmonstone Craigie
Preceded by Sir Henry Sheehy Keating	Colonel of the 90th Regiment of Foot (Perthshire Volunteers); 1841–1853	Succeeded by Felix Calvert
