= Carruthers Beattie =

Sir Carruthers Beattie FRSE
- Born: John Carruthers Beattie; 21 November 1866; Waterbeck, Scotland
- Died: 10 September 1946 (aged 79); Cape Town, Union of South Africa
- Education: University of Edinburgh
- Spouse: Elizabeth Paton (m. 1898)
- Children: 3
- Scientific career
- Fields: Physics, Vice Chancellor
- Workplaces: University of Cape Town
- Thesis: The Behaviour of Bismuth Plates in a Steady Magnetic Field (1896)

Sir John Carruthers Beattie FRSE (21 November 1866 – 10 September 1946) was the first principal and Vice Chancellor of the University of Cape Town (1918–1937).

Beattie was born in Waterbeck, Scotland. He graduated from the University of Edinburgh having studied at the Ludwig-Maximilians-Universität München, the University of Vienna, the Friedrich Wilhelm University of Berlin, and the University of Glasgow. Soon afterwards, he was appointed Professor of Applied Mathematics and Experimental Physics at South African College in Cape Town. He married Elizabeth Paton in 1898. They had two daughters and a son. Their son was killed while serving with the Royal Air Force in 1942. For his contributions to education in South Africa, he was knighted in 1920. He died in Cape Town.

== Life ==
John Carruthers Beattie was born on 21 November 1866, in Dumfriesshire.

He attended St John's Boarding School in Workington and Moray House in Edinburgh. He entered the University of Edinburgh and obtained a degree in Chemistry, Botany and Mathematics before furthered his studies in physics at the Ludwig-Maximilians-Universität München, the University of Vienna, the Friedrich Wilhelm University of Berlin and the University of Glasgow (under Lord Kelvin). In 1896, he was awarded a Doctorate of Science from the University of Edinburgh for his thesis entitled The Behaviour of Bismuth Plates in a Steady Magnetic Field.

He married Elizabeth Paton in 1898.

He died in Cape Town in South Africa.

== University career ==
In 1897, Beattie was appointed as Professor of Applied Mathematics and Experimental Physics at the South African College in Cape Town. Beattie's research included the influence of X-rays, ultra-violet light, and the rays from uranium on the electrical conductivity of gases, and the leakage of electricity from charged bodies at moderate temperatures. During the Anglo-Boer War in February 1899, he and others demonstrated the application of wireless telegraphy by transmitting signals over a distance of 120 metres on Cape Town's Grand Parade using equipment imported from Britain. In 1901 he began a magnetic survey of South Africa with Prof John Todd Morrison. Starting in 1908 he extended the survey through central Africa to Egypt, arriving in Cairo in December 1909.

Beginning in 1904, there was a movement to obtain a charter for both the University of Cape Town and the University of Stellenbosch. Alfred Beit, a mining magnate and one of Cecil John Rhodes' collaborators, died in 1906 leaving a bequest of £200 000 for the creation of a university in Johannesburg. The then government though had a preference for Rhodes's idea of establishing a university in Cape Town on his former estate. The Beit trustees were then persuaded to allow the Beit Bequest to rather be used to pursue Rhodes's dream and additionally to contribute a further £300 000. Establishing a new university adjacent to South African College would then have inhibited its further development. Seeing an opportunity, Beattie became involved in the 'audacious bid' to develop South African College into this new national university. He succeeded, despite strong opposition from people in Johannesburg who wished to establish the university there, and the Beit's Bequest was subsequently used to establish the University of Cape Town.

Beattie in 1917 was appointed as Principal of the South African College, abandoning his academic research. In 1918, he was appointed as the first vice-chancellor and Principal of the University of Cape Town, which he held until his retirement at the end of 1937. He was responsible for the establishment of the campus on the slopes of Table Mountain. The move to the present-day campus took place between 1928 and 1929. This helped establish the reputation of the university, opening of new departments and greatly increasing in the number of students from about 600 in 1918 to 2200 in 1938.

== Awards ==
Beattie was a member of the Edinburgh Mathematical Society, joining in November 1891. He was elected to the Royal Society of Edinburgh on 1 March 1897, his proposers being Sir William Thomson (Lord Kelvin), Peter Guthrie Tait, Alexander Crum Brown and Cargill Gilston Knott. He was a member of the South African Philosophical Society and was elected as president for the 1905-6 session. In 1910 he was awarded by the South African Association for the Advancement of Science the South Africa Medal and Grant; he was President of Section A of the Association in that year and President of the Association in 1928. In 1920 he was knighted for his services to education.

Honorary degrees were conferred on him by the Universities of the Witwatersrand, Edinburgh, and Cape Town. The citation for the Honorary degree from the University of Edinburgh on 2 July 1927 reads:

Sir John Carruthers Beattie, F.R.S.E., Vice-Chancellor and Principal of the University of Cape Town (in absentia.) Sir Carruthers Beattie is an alumnus and Doctor of Science of Edinburgh, who went to Cape Town as Professor of Physics thirty years ago, and soon traversed the heart of the African continent in the course of a magnetic survey. The reputation he made for himself as Professor led to his selection as Principal of the University of Cape Town, when that institution, largely his handiwork, was established in 1918. When its new buildings are completed within a year or two, there will be fulfilled the vision of Cecil Rhodes, who dreamt of a great South African University rising on the slopes of Table Mountain, and actually selected and gifted a site in this magnificent situation. This temple of learning will be a lasting memorial both of the great empire-builder who first conceived the idea, and of the Vice-Chancellor whose executive ability and unflagging exertions have brought it into being. Sir Carruthers's great services to the Dominion have been recognised by the Knighthood conferred upon him, and his alma mater is proud to laureate a son whose name is written so large in the academic history of South Africa; her only regret is that distance and pressure of affairs prevent his presence at today's ceremony.

His numerous public activities included membership of the Board of Trustees of the South African Public Library, Cape Town (Chairman for several years), membership of the Scientific and Industrial Research Committee of the Union of South Africa and Vice-Chairman of the South African Broadcasting Board from 1937 to 1943.

Academic offices
New title	Vice-Chancellor of the University of Cape Town; 1918–1937	Succeeded by AW Falconer
