= Forgue =

Coordinates: 57°29′23.6″N 2°38′58.5″W

- Location within Aberdeenshire
- OS grid reference: NJ607452
- Council area: Aberdeenshire
- Lieutenancy area: Aberdeenshire
- Country: Scotland
- Sovereign state: United Kingdom
- Post town: HUNTLY
- Postcode district: AB54
- Police: Scotland
- Fire: Scottish
- Ambulance: Scottish
- UK Parliament: Gordon and Buchan
- Scottish Parliament: Aberdeenshire West

Forgue is a hamlet in Aberdeenshire. It lies 35 miles (56 km) northwest of Aberdeen and 8 miles (13 km) northeast of Huntly. It is northwest of the village Largue.

The hamlet is surrounded by the lands of Bognie Estate, which have been held by the Morisons of Bognie since 1635.

The Glendronach distillery, Bognie Castle and Scott Hall are located within the wider area.

== History ==
Forgue parish church was built 1819 to a design by Archibald Simpson and is Category B listed. The adjacent churchyard is C listed. Since 2007, the parish church has been run as a community facility.

St. Margaret's Episcopal Church was built in 1856 to a design by William Ramage.

In 1884, a parish hall was erected in Forgue, named Scott's Hall, it was gifted to the community by Walter Scott of Glendronach Distillery.

== Education ==
Forgue primary school was built in 1865.

== Notable residents ==
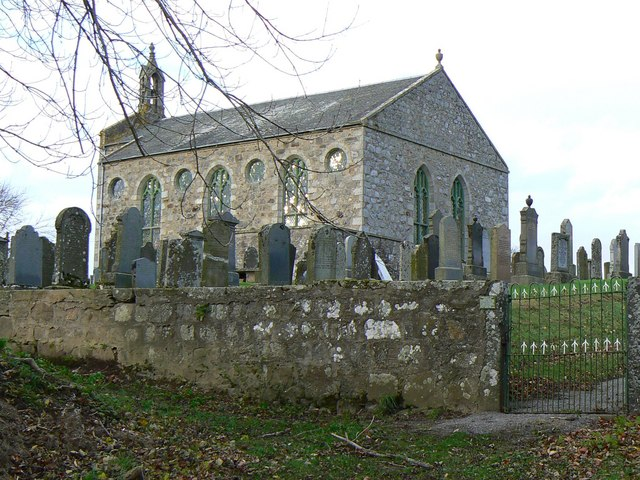
Forgue parish church

- George Bartlet, Dean of Aberdeen and Orkney
- Sir George Stuart Forbes, Indian civil servant
- John Fordyce, missionary
- George Garden, religious controversialist
- General Sir Alexander Leith, British soldier
- J Cameron Peddie, preacher
- John Stuart, archivist and genealogist
- Thomas Thain, Canadian politician
- George Thom, mathematician and educator
- Bell Duncan, Scottish traditional singer

== See also ==
- Listed buildings in Forgue
