= Caroline Flanagan =

Scottish lawyer (born 1960)

Caroline Flanagan (born 1960) is a Scottish lawyer who served as president of the Law Society of Scotland from 2005 to 2006, the first woman to hold the post. She was also the youngest person to hold the position.

== Early life and education ==
Born Caroline Ebbot on 12 January 1960 she was educated at Dollar Academy from 1971 to 1978, and then studied law at the University of Edinburgh.

== Career ==
Flanagan was a partner at the Dunfermline law firm Ross & Connel and is an accredited family law specialist. She was first elected to the Law Society of Scotland Council in 1998 after working as a client relations committee member for five years.

Flanagan retired in 2022.

== Personal life ==
She lives in Dunfermline and is married to Roy Flanagan and has two children, Claire and James.
