= Dollar Academy =

Day and boarding school in Clackmannanshire, Scotland

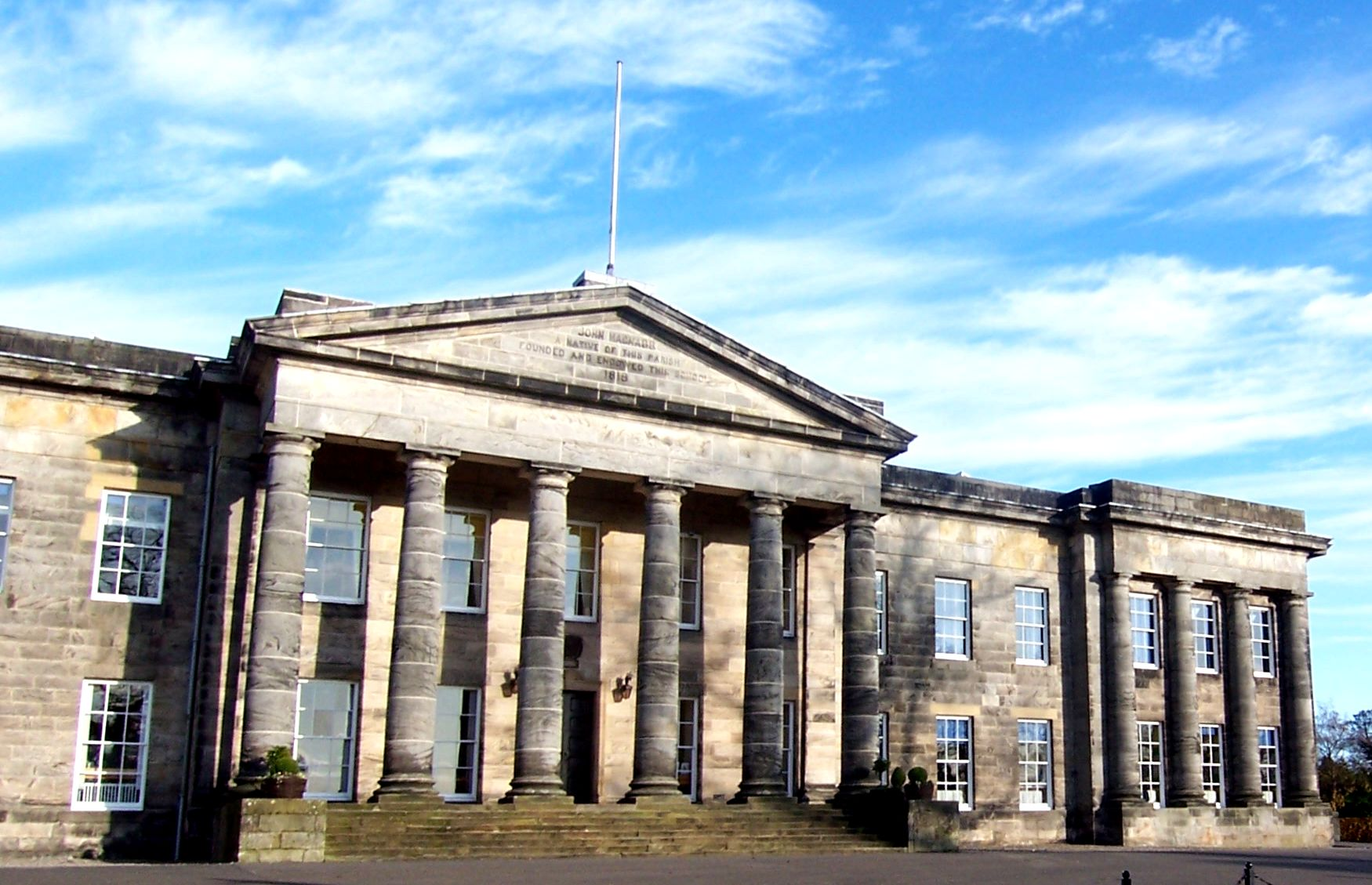
- Coat of arms Dollar Academy (Playfair Building)

Location
- Academy Place; Dollar, Clackmannanshire, FK14 7DU; Scotland

Information
- Type: Private day and boarding school
- Motto: Juventutis Veho Fortunas (Latin: "I carry the fortunes of youth")
- Established: 1818; 208 years ago
- Founder: Captain John McNab
- Rector: Ian Munro
- Gender: Coeducational
- Age: 5 to 18
- Enrolment: c. 1200
- Houses: Atholl, Mar, Stewart, Argyll
- Colour
- Publication: Fortunas (biannual publication)
- Alumni: Old Academicals
- School newspaper: The Galley Student Newspaper
- Website: dollaracademy.org.uk

Dollar Academy is a 5–18 private co-educational day and boarding school in Scotland. The open campus occupies a 70-acre (28-hectare) site in the centre of Dollar, Clackmannanshire, at the foot of the Ochil Hills. The school was founded in 1818 following a bequest by the sea captain, merchant and ship-owner John McNabb, and the architect William Henry Playfair was responsible for the design of the school building.

== History ==
=== Establishment ===
Dollar Academy was founded in 1818 following a bequest by the Scottish sea captain, merchant and ship-owner John McNabb, who bequeathed £65,000 (equivalent to £5,478,398 in 2025) to provide "a charity or school for the poor of the parish of Dollar where I was born". Born in 1732 into a poor family of farmers, McNabb escaped from poverty through a career at sea, which eventually led him to own his own shipping company. Between 1789 and 1791, four ships owned by his company engaged in slaving voyages as part of the Atlantic slave trade. In 2019, the academy commissioned a research project in collaboration with external advisors to understand the extent of McNabb’s involvement in the slave trade. The school also teaches about McNabb's links to the slave trade in several subjects.

=== Architecture ===
William Playfair was commissioned to design the building. The interior of the Playfair Building was gutted by a fire in 1961, but Playfair's Greek-style outer facades remained intact. The interior was rebuilt on a plan based on central corridors with equal-sized classrooms on both sides. An extra (second) floor was concealed, increasing the total available space. The school was re-opened in 1966 by former pupil Lord Heyworth, and the assembly hall was rebuilt after the fire. The school library is a "whispering gallery" because of its domed ceiling.

Many other buildings have been added to the school over time- such as the Dewar Building for science and the Maguire Building for art and physical education. And in 2016 the Westwater Building was added, named after Private George Philip Westwater, an FP killed in the First World War at Gallipoli. This building contains the Modern Languages department and two Economics classrooms.

=== Recent history ===
Dollar Academy library prior to the 1961 fire

In 1961, a fire broke out at the school which destroyed the interior of the Playfair Building, with all classrooms and the school library containing 12,000 books being destroyed. Following the outbreak of the fire, the local community and school staff provided assistance for the rebuilding and restructuring of the school whilst teaching continued for pupils within the Prep School facilities as well as within Harviestoun Castle, local halls and even in private houses. The inside of the Playfair Building was reconstructed on three floors instead of the original two and finally re-opened in 1966.

During the 1970s, there was a change in legislation which ultimately resulted in the phasing out the "Direct Grant". The Central Regional Council decide to not continue with the long-standing agreement which was in place in regards to fees for Dollar Parish pupils which resulted in the school becoming an entirely independent school.

In 2024, Dollar Academy was awarded The Sunday Times "Scottish Independent School of the Year".

== Overview ==
=== Coat of arms ===
The school has its own coat of arms which, in its present form, was devised by the Lord Lyon King of Arms in 1918. The motifs that feature on the coat of arms are derived from the clan Campbell coat of arms, whilst Castle Campbell, dominant as part of both the town and the school, was the lowland seat of the earls and dukes of Argyll, chiefs of clan Campbell, from the 15th to the 19th centuries. The ship motif was lifted directly from the Campbell arms and features as the centrepiece of the school's arms.

Additionally, the coat of arms features an open book (a symbol of knowledge) and the lamp of learning, and it includes the school's motto – Juventutis Veho Fortunas – which translates to “I bear the fortunes of youth”.

=== Enrolment and houses ===
Pupils attending a morning assembly

As of 2020, there are over 1,200 pupils at Dollar Academy, making it the sixth largest independent school in Scotland. Day pupils are usually from the village of Dollar or the surrounding counties of Clackmannanshire, Stirlingshire, Perth and Kinross, and Fife. The remaining pupils are boarders. Almost 50% of the boarding pupils are from overseas, with the rest being British nationals.

There are currently four school houses:

- Atholl
- Mar
- Stewart
- Argyll

=== Traditions ===
Each year full colours and half colours are awarded to senior pupils for achievement in sporting or cultural pursuits. These awards merit piping on the school blazer (blue for cultural, white for sporting) and/or a distinctive blazer badge. Internationalists' Award ties are presented to pupils, prep, junior, and senior, who have represented their country in sporting or cultural activities.

=== Pipe Band ===
The school has two main pipe bands. The "A" band won the Scottish Schools CCF Pipes and Drums competition every year from 2000 to 2012 and 2014 and 2015, as well as winning the RSPBA World Pipe Band Championships in 2010, 2014, 2015, 2017, 2019, 2022 and 2023. In 2013, the band was placed first at the last "Major" of the season, the Cowal Gathering. In 2015, 2017, 2018, 2019, 2022 and 2023 the band won the Scottish, British, United Kingdom, European, and World Championships, leading to them being awarded the title "Champion of Champions". Additionally, the Novice A, or "B" band won the British, Scottish, and European Championships in 2015, and was crowned "Champion of Champions".

=== Rectors ===
The Revd Dr Andrew Mylne, first Rector of Dollar Academy, (1818–1850)

- The Rev. Dr Andrew Mylne DD (1818–1850)
- The Rev. Dr Thomas Burbidge (1850–1851)
- The Dr John Milne LLD (1851–1868)
- The Rev. Dr William Barrack (1868–1878)
- George Thom (1878–1902)
- Charles Dougall (1902–1923)
- Hugh Martin (1923–1936)
- Harry Bell OBE (1936–1960)
- James Millar (1960–1962) – Acting Rector
- Graham Richardson (1962–1975)
- Ian Hendry (1975–1984)
- Lloyd Harrison (1984–1994)
- John Robertson (1994–2010)
- David Knapman (2010–2019)
- Ian Munro (current Rector)

== Notable alumni ==
=== Academia and science ===
- John Thomas Irvine Boswell, botanist
- John Macmillan Brown, university professor and administrator
- Andrew Clark, Church of England clergyman, scholar, and diarist
- Sir James Dewar, inventor of the vacuum flask
- John Archibald Watt Dollar, veterinarian to four monarchs
- George Alexander Gibson, physician and geologist
- Sir David Gill, astronomer
- William Frederick Harvey, public health expert, Director of the Central Research Institute in India, Vice President of the Royal Society of Edinburgh
- Professor Sir Donald Mackay, economist
- Matthew Hay, physician and forensic expert
- John Robertson Henderson FRSE zoologist and antiquary
- Sir Hector Hetherington, social philosopher
- Henry Halcro Johnston botanist
- James MacRitchie, Municipal Engineer in Singapore 1883–95, Lighthouse Engineer in Japan
- Agnes Murgoci English zoologist, folklorist and teacher
- James Samuel Risien Russell Guyanese-British physician, neurologist,
- Sir David Wallace, CMG, FRCSEd, Surgeon
- Andrew Wilson FRSE (1852-1912) zoologist and author

=== Politics ===
- Herbert Beresford, Canadian politician
- Sir George Birdwood, colonial administrator in India
- Lord Constable CBE, KC, Conservative politician and judge
- William Scott Fell, Australian Liberal politician and businessman
- Sir John Dunlop Imrie FRSE CBE, City Chamberlain of Edinburgh 1926–1951, First Government Commissioner of Trinidad and Tobago 1951–53
- Sir George Reid, Lord Lieutenant for Clackmannanshire and former Presiding Officer of the Scottish Parliament
- Sir William Snadden Bt, Conservative politician
- Euphemia Gilchrist Somerville, social worker and local politician
- Sir Frank Swettenham, first Resident-General of the Federated Malay States
- Mandy Telford, former President of the National Union of Students
- James Galloway Weir, Liberal MP and sewing machine entrepreneur
- Rt Hon Lord Keen of Elie PC QC, Conservative Party politician lawyer

=== Media and arts ===
- Henry Clark Barlow, literary scholar
- Ian Hamilton Finlay, poet, playwright, artist and experimental garden designer
- Alasdair Hutton OBE TD, announcer, former journalist and politician
- Alan Johnston, BBC Gaza correspondent taken hostage in 2007
- Doreen Jones, casting director
- Fergus McCreadie, jazz musician and 2022 Mercury Prize nominee
- Fraser Nelson, journalist
- George Henry Paulin, sculptor
- Jessie M. Soga, LRAM, contralto singer and suffragist
- Jo L. Walton, poet
- Harry Raymond Egerton Watt, film director
- Andrew Whalley, architect
- John McAslan, architect

=== Law ===
- Lord Brodie, judge
- Andrew Constable, Lord Constable
- Caroline Flanagan, President of the Law Society of Scotland 2005
- Richard Keen, Baron Keen of Elie, Advocate General and Justice Minister
- James Avon Clyde, Lord Clyde, judge

=== Military ===
- Sir Charles Morton Forbes, naval officer
- Colin Mackenzie, army and political officer in India

=== Royal or noble ===
- The Master of Bruce (future 13th Earl of Elgin)
- Various members of the Ethiopian Imperial Family including the nephews of Haile Selassie
- James MacArthur of Milton, Chief of Clan Arthur
- The Master of Moncreiff (future 7th Baron Moncreiff)
- Sir Arthur Bolt Nicolson, 9th Bt

=== Business ===
- Iain Anderson, automotive industry executive
- David Greig, landowner
- Lord Heyworth of Oxton, Chairman of Unilever and ICI
- Sir Archibald Page, engineer and electricity supply manager
- Sir William Reid - mining engineer and joint author of the "Reid Report" on the state of British mining
- Sir Wei Yuk – nineteenth-century Hong Kong businessman and legislator

=== Sport ===
- Iain Anderson, first-class cricketer
- Jim Thompson, Scottish 7s rugby player
- John Barclay, Scottish rugby player
- Hamish Brown, mountaineer and writer
- Adam Kelso Fulton, Scottish rugby player
- Cameron Glasgow, Scottish rugby player
- Rory Lawson, Scottish rugby player
- Graeme Morrison, Scottish rugby player
- Jennifer McIntosh, Rifle shooter, five times Commonwealth Games Medallist, double European Champion and two-time Olympian
- Seonaid McIntosh, Rifle shooter, double Commonwealth Games Medallist, World Champion, double European Champion and Olympian
- Shirley McIntosh, Rifle shooter, four times Commonwealth Games medallist
- Archibald MacLaren, gymnast, fencing master and author
- Mike Adamson, former Scottish rugby player and referee
- Hugh Stewart, cricketer and cricket administrator
- Evie Wills, Scottish rugby player

=== Miscellaneous ===
- Sara Mendes da Costa, voice of the speaking clock
- Charles Maxwell Heddle, merchant
- Sir Thomas Morison Legge, factory inspector
- Tom Kitchin, chef
- G. A. Frank Knight, minister, archaeological author, and conchologist
