= Johnny Morrison =

Johnny Morrison may refer to:

- Johnny Morrison (baseball) (1895–1966)
- Johnny Morrison (footballer) (1911–1984)
- Johnny E. Morrison, American judge for the Third Circuit of Virginia
- John Morrison (wrestler) (born 1979), sometimes referred to as Johnny Morrison

== See also ==
- John Morrison (disambiguation)
