= Morrison Lake =

Morrison Lake may refer to:

- Morrison Lake (Minnesota), a lake in Cass County
- Morrison Lake (Ontario)
