= Largue, Aberdeenshire =

Coordinates: 57°27′50.7″N 2°36′03.5″W

Largue
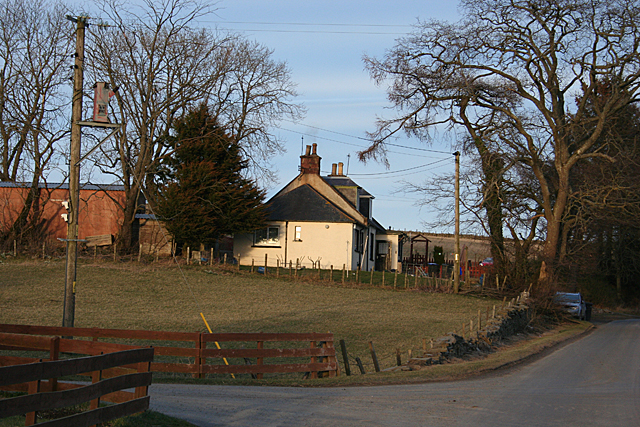
- Cottage at Largue

- Location within Aberdeenshire
- Civil parish: Forgue
- Council area: Aberdeenshire
- Country: Scotland
- Sovereign state: United Kingdom
- Police: Scotland
- Fire: Scottish
- Ambulance: Scottish

Largue is a small village in Aberdeenshire in the parish of Forgue. Areas within the settlement include Easter Aucharnie, Nether Aucharnie and Aucharnie. Largue is located southeast of Forgue and north of Ythanwells. The nearby Brae of Largue is a farm.

== History ==
To the western edge of Largue there is a mid-18th century mansion house, Templeland, that is Category B listed.

In 1840, the Auchaber free church and manse were built just outside Largue, although the church and manse are in private ownership since 2025.

The former cottage hospital was built in 1874 at the desire of Alexander Morison of Bognie.

== School ==
Largue School is a primary school in the village serving age groups P1 to P7. The school was threatened with closure due to declining student numbers in 2023 but the council postponed closure plans.
