= Douglas Morison =

English painter

- Born: 22 August 1814; Tottenham, Middlesex
- Died: 12 February 1847 (aged 32); Datchet
- Occupation: Painter

Douglas Morison (22 August 1814 – 12 February 1847) was an English painter.

== Biography ==
Morison was born at Tottenham in Middlesex on 22 August 1814, was the son of Dr. Richard Morison of Datchet, near Windsor. He studied drawing under John Frederick Tayler, and practised chiefly in water colours. His works were principally of an architectural nature, but he painted several views in Scotland. He was elected an associate of the Royal Institute or New Society of Painters in Watercolours in 1836, but resigned in 1838. On 12 February 1844 he was elected an associate of the Royal (or 'Old') Society of Painters in Water-colours. He also practised in lithography, published some illustrations of 'The Eglinton Tournament,' in 1842 a set of views in lithography of 'Haddon Hall,' and in 1846 lithographic ' Views of the Ducal Palaces of Saxe-Coburg and Gotha,' from sketches made on the spot, with notes and suggestions from the prince consort. He made some sketches for the queen at Windsor Castle, and he received several medals in recognition of his art. Morison died at his residence at Datchet on 12 February 1847. He exhibited occasionally at the Royal Academy from 1836 to 1841. His sister Letitia was the wife of Percival Leigh.
