= Morrison Lake (Minnesota) =

Lake in the state of Minnesota, United States

- Location within Minnesota
- Location: Cass County, Minnesota
- Coordinates: 46°49′20″N 93°52′44″W
- Type: lake

Morrison Lake is a lake in Cass County, Minnesota, in the United States.

Morrison Lake was named for an early lumberman.

== See also ==
- List of lakes in Minnesota
