= John Todd Morrison =

Scottish scientist and meteorologist

- Born: 1863
- Died: 1944 (aged 80–81); Stellenbosch, South Africa
- Education: University of Edinburgh
- Scientific career
- Fields: Meteorology
- Workplaces: Stellenbosch University

Prof John Todd Morrison FRSE FRSSA (1863–1944) was a Scottish scientist and meteorologist who lived most of his professional life in South Africa. Stellenbosch University created the John Todd Morrison Research Medal in his memory.

== Life ==
Morrison was born in Muthill in Perthshire in 1863, the second son of Mary Todd and James Morrison, who owned a small shoemaking company. He was educated locally for seven years, then spent three years at George Watson's College, where he was school dux.

He studied science at the University of Edinburgh, graduating with an MA in 1883 and gaining a second degree (BSc) in 1888. From 1886 he lectured in physics at Heriot-Watt University. In 1891 he emigrated to Cape Colony to take on the post of Professor of Chemistry and Physics at Victoria College, Stellenbosch.

In 1892 he was elected a Fellow of the Royal Society of Edinburgh. His proposers were Peter Guthrie Tait, Alexander Crum Brown, Alexander Buchan and Cargill Gilston Knott.

In 1901 he joined forces with John Carruthers Beattie to undertake a study of magnetism at the Cape of Good Hope. Following this the study was widened to encompass all of South Africa.

He retired in 1934, and died at Stellenbosch in 1944.
