= SUNY Orange =

Community college in Orange County, New York, U.S.

SUNY Orange (Orange County Community College)
- Motto: If you have the dream, we have the way!
- Type: Public community college
- Established: 1950; 76 years ago
- Parent institution: State University of New York
- President: Kristine M. Young
- Undergraduates: 5,940 (fall 2025)
- Location: Middletown, New York, United States; 41.439863°N 74.426923°W
- Campus: Suburban 37 acres (0.15 km^{2})
- Colors: navy blue and orange
- Nickname: Colts
- Sporting affiliations: NJCAA – Region XV, Mid-Hudson Athletic Conference
- Website: www.sunyorange.edu

SUNY Orange (Orange County Community College) is a public community college with two campuses, one in Middletown, New York, and one in Newburgh, New York. It is part of the State University of New York (SUNY) system and offers almost 40 associate degrees and certificate programs. SUNY Orange is accredited by Middle States Commission on Higher Education. The college employs an open enrollment policy to all applicants who are graduates of an accredited high school or recipients of a state high school equivalency diploma.

== History ==
As late as 1945, on the west side of the Hudson River from New York City to the state capital at Albany, there were only two colleges, the United States Military Academy at West Point and what would become SUNY New Paltz. Orange County did not have a public college, and consequently in 1948, research began to find a suitable site.

The Webb Horton House and property, now the 'mansion' at the Middletown campus, was chosen for founding the college. Built by Webb Horton, the mansion was left to his cousin, John H. Morrison, upon his death. His wife Mrs. Christine Morrison, lived there alone after the death of her husband in 1946. In 1950, she donated the mansion and property as the home of Orange County Community College.

The College was founded in 1950, opening its doors to 160 students as the first county-sponsored community college in the SUNY system. It was the first community college in the nation to offer a two-year nursing degree program.

When it opened, the College consisted of Morrison Hall and Horton Hall, on 14 acres. Today, it has 12 buildings at the Middletown campus, and two buildings at the Newburgh campus.

== Campuses ==
SUNY Orange comprises two campuses: the main one in city of Middletown, New York and the Newburgh branch campus, situated on the banks of the Hudson River.

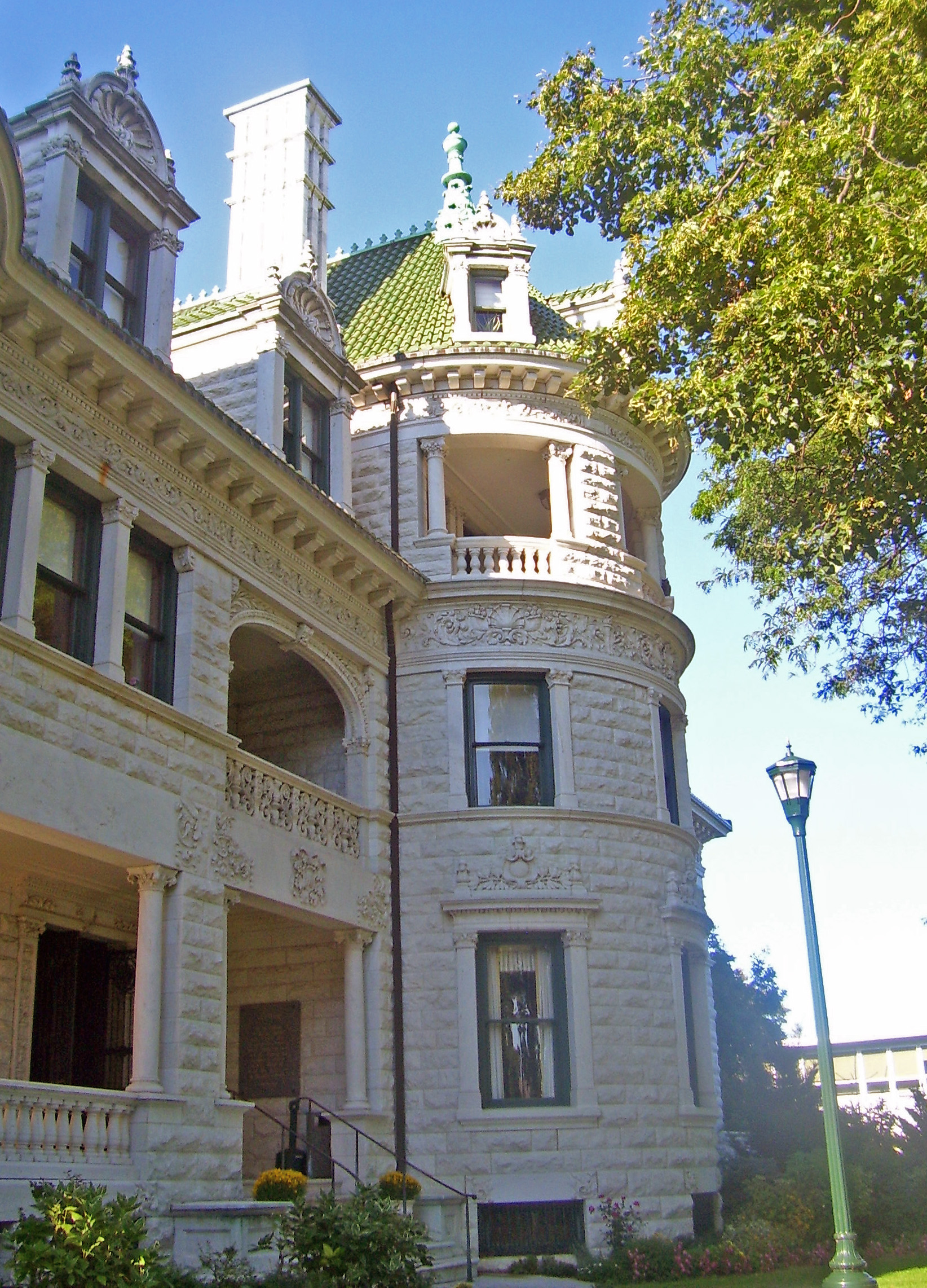
Morrison Hall - SUNY Orange Middletown Campus

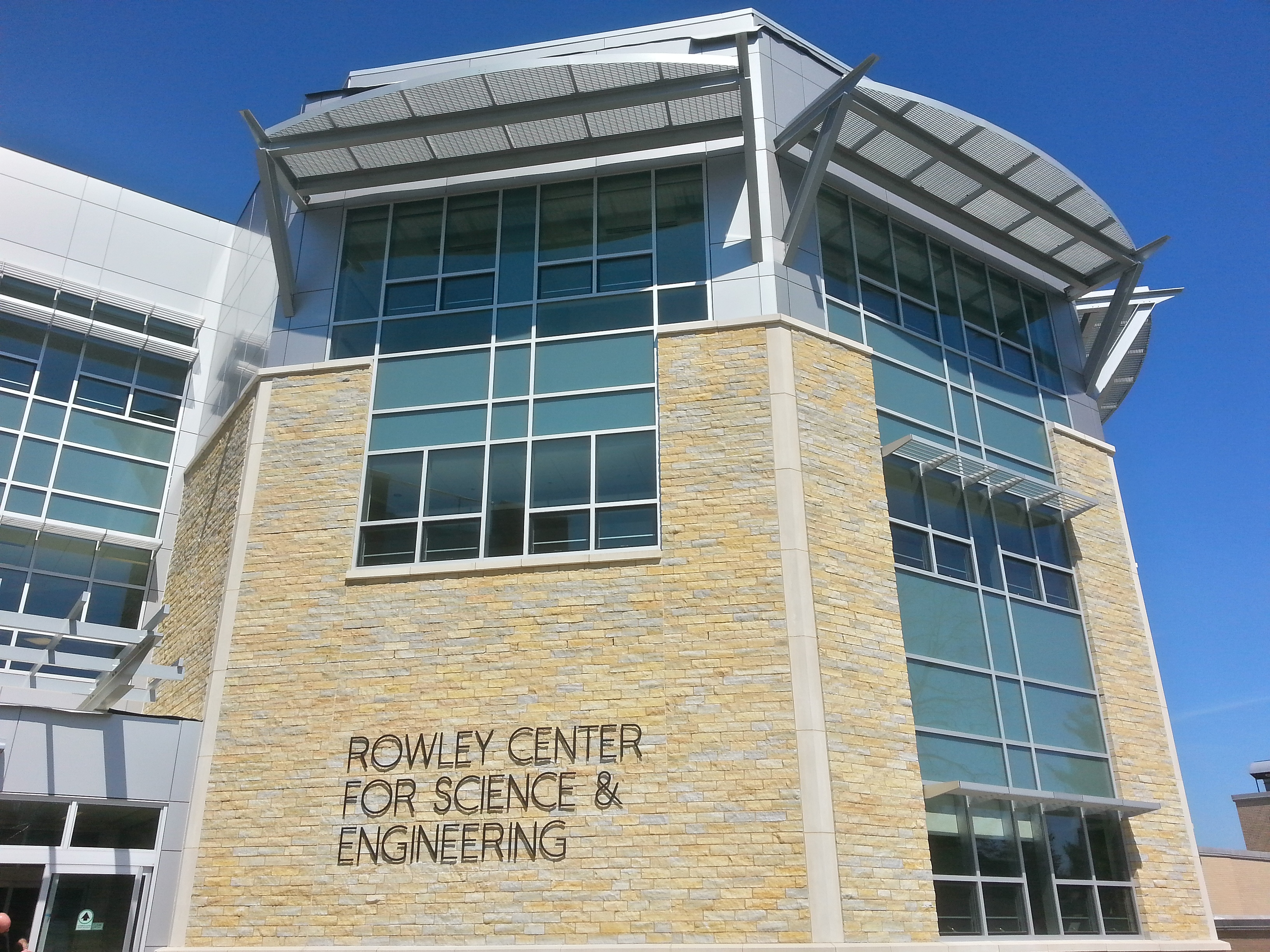
The Rowley Center for Science and Engineering, at the Middletown Campus of SUNY Orange.

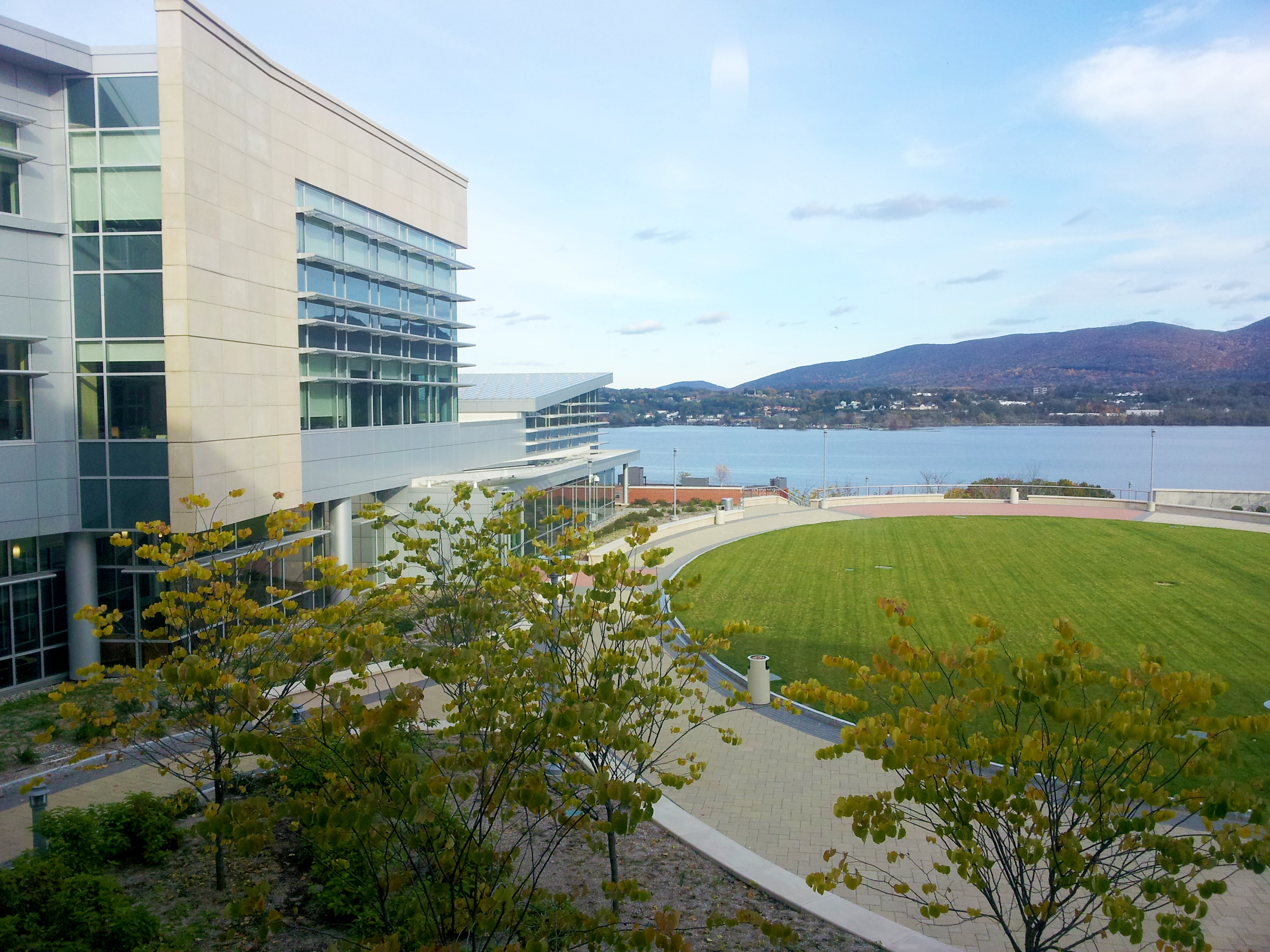
The Hudson River from Kaplan Hall, at the SUNY Orange Newburgh Campus.

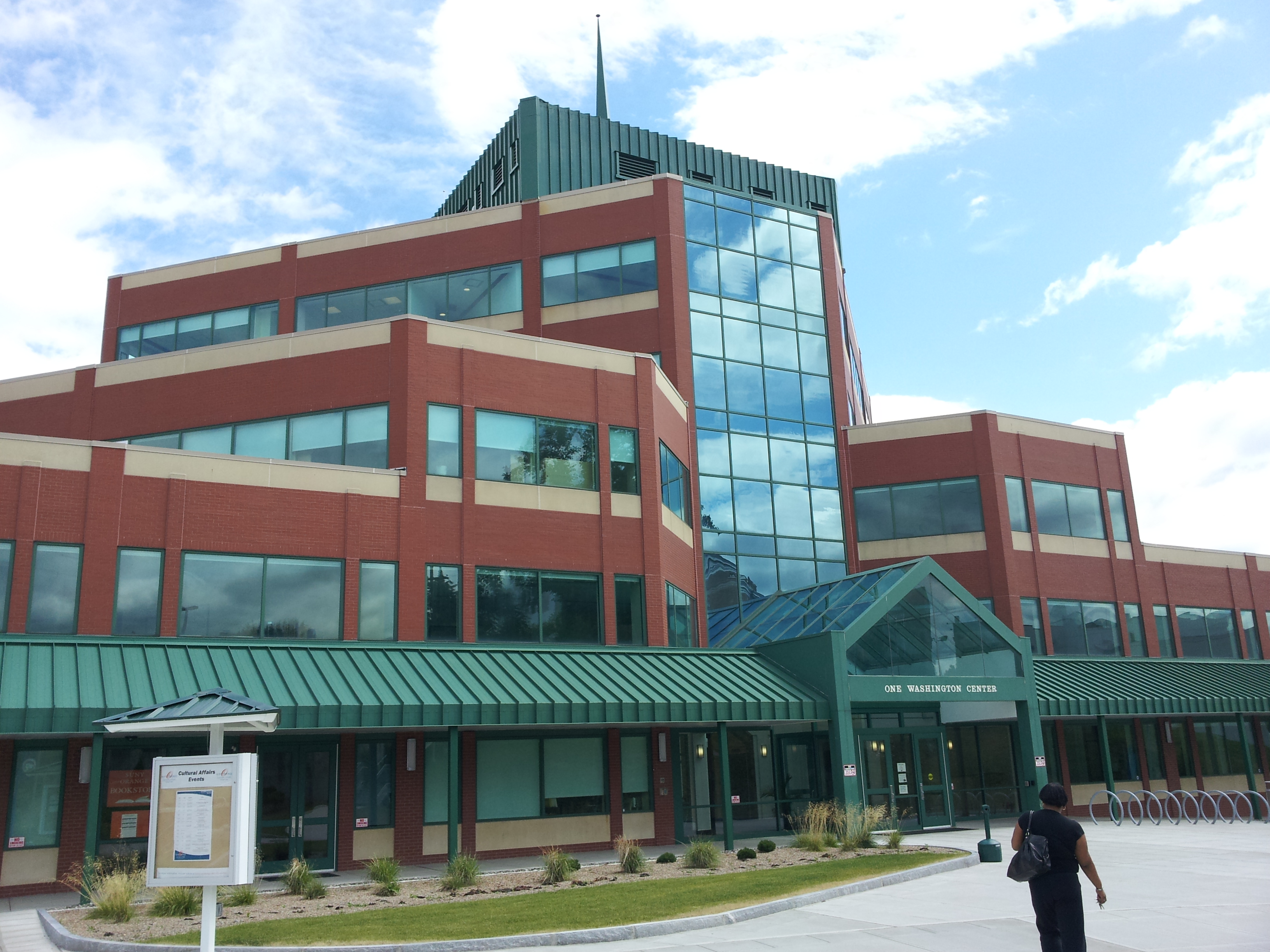
Tower Building on the SUNY Orange Newburgh Campus.

== Academics ==
SUNY Orange offers a total of 39 associate degrees and certificate programs. As of 2023, the college enrolled approximately 6,500 students annually. The college has matriculation agreements with more than 30 four-year institutions, facilitating the transfer of SUNY Orange students graduating with an associate degree who want to complete 4-year degrees.

== Student life ==
The Middletown campus offers a dental clinic, fitness studios, a swimming pool, soccer and softball fields, computer and tutorial labs, child-care facilities, theatre, gymnasium, art gallery, gaming rooms and micro-markets on-campus. The Newburgh campus has its own child-care facilities, fitness room, micro-market, art gallery, and gaming room. The college also has a chapter of Phi Theta Kappa, the international honors society for two-year colleges.

The college also has an Alumni Relations office which holds events specifically for alumni throughout the year.

== Community programs and events ==
The college's Continuing and Professional Education department offers G.E.D. programs, industry certifications and personal enrichments programs. The ENCORE program offers classes for people over 50. The college allows free auditing of classes for community members 60 or above. The college's Cultural Affairs department has a variety of exhibits, lectures, master classes, theater performances and concerts each semester which are open to the public.

== See also ==
- Webb Horton House
