= Bognie Castle =

Ruined castle in Scotland

Conzie Castle
- Aberdeenshire
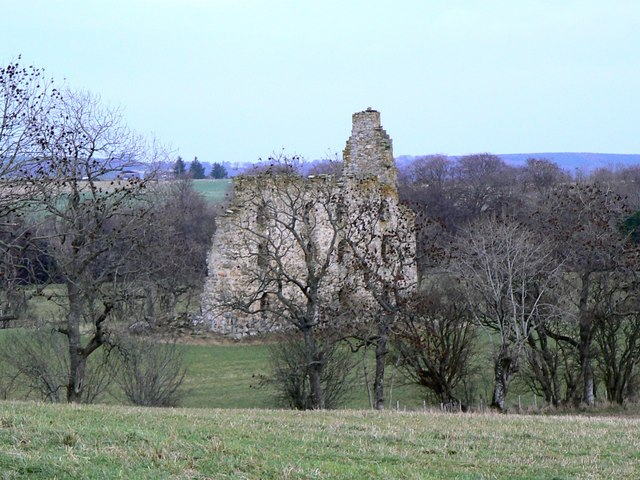
- Ruins of Conzie Castle in 2006

Location
- Coordinates: 57.49339928105619°N 2.6774564185801695°W

Site history
- Built: 17th century

Scheduled monument
- Official name: Conzie Castle and Doocot
- Type: Secular: castle; doocote, dovecote, pigeon loft; manor house
- Designated: 14 February 1994
- Reference no.: SM5899

Bognie Castle (also called Conzie Castle) is a ruined castle on Bognie Estate, between Huntly and Banff, in the parish of Forgue, Aberdeenshire region of Scotland. Once rising four storeys high, it is thought to have been constructed in the 1660s by the Morisons of Bognie.

== History ==
Bognie Castle was most likely built in the 1660s by the Morisons of Bognie when they lived at Bognie House. However, there is no evidence of the Morisons ever inhabiting it. This is most likely due to their subsequent acquisition of Frendraught through marriage around 1676. The 1688 date-stone at Frendraught suggests that they elected to complete the (re)construction of Frendraught that had begun under Sir James Crichton (following the Fire of Frendraught in 1630).

There is some confusion about the name of this building. Local enquiries cannot confirm if it had ever been known by any name other than 'Conzie', the only information being that it was originally situated on land belonging to the farm of Conzie, but which has long belonged to Bognie Estate. Castle Conzie may have stood a little to the west of Bognie House, but no trace of it remains.
