= Morrisson =

Morrisson may refer to:

== People ==
- Morrisson (rapper)
- Andrew Morrisson, a British classical organist
- Cécile Morrisson, a French historian and numismatist
- Mary Foulke Morrisson, an American suffragist and social activist

== See also ==
- Morrisson v Robertson, a case establishing the common law principles that govern unilateral error in Scots law
- Morrison (disambiguation)
