= John Morrison (Australian footballer) =

Australian rules footballer

Personal information
- Full name: John Morrison
- Born: 22 September 1947 (age 79)
- Original team: East Coburg
- Height: 175 cm (5 ft 9 in)
- Weight: 71.5 kg (158 lb)

Playing career^{1}
Years	Club	Games (Goals)
1966–67	Carlton	5 (2)
- ^{1} Playing statistics correct to the end of 1967.

John Morrison (born 22 September 1947) is a former Australian rules footballer who played with Carlton in the Victorian Football League (VFL).
