= Morrisonville =

Morrisonville may refer to:

United States

- Morrisonville, Illinois, a village
- Morrisonville, New York, a hamlet
- Morrisonville, Virginia, an unincorporated community
- Morrisonville, Louisiana, an abandoned community
- Morrisonville, Wisconsin, an unincorporated community
