= Hugh Stewart (cricketer) =

Scottish cricketer and administrator

Personal information
- Full name: Hugh Lambert Stewart
- Born: 2 May 1907; Ceres, Fife, Scotland
- Died: 12 December 1995 (aged 88); Cupar, Fife, Scotland
- Batting: Right-handed
- Bowling: Right-arm fast-medium

Domestic team information
- Years: Team
- 1932: Scotland

Career statistics
Competition	First-class
Matches	2
Runs scored	42
Batting average	10.50
100s/50s	–/–
Top score	25
Balls bowled	150
Wickets	1
Bowling average	71.00
5 wickets in innings	–
10 wickets in match	–
Best bowling	1/31
Catches/stumpings	2/–
- Source: Cricinfo, 30 July 2022

Hugh Lambert Stewart JP (2 May 1907 — 12 December 1995) was a Scottish first-class cricketer and administrator.

Stewart was born in May 1907 at Ceres, Fife. He was educated at the Dollar Academy. A club cricketer for Cupar Cricket Club, Stewart made two appearances in first-class cricket for Scotland in 1932, against Ireland at Grennock and the touring South Americans at Edinburgh. He scored 45 runs in his two matches, with a highest score of 25, while with his right-arm fast-medium bowling, he took a single wicket. Stewart later served as the president of the Scottish Cricket Union in 1962.

Outside of cricket, Stewart was also a noted rugby player. He was a justice of the peace for Fife, being appointed in December 1934. Stewart died in December 1995 at Cupar, Fife.
