= Kipling Gordon Morison =

Canadian electrical engineer

- Occupation: Electrical engineer
- Employer: BC Hydro
- Known for: Contributions to on‑line stability assessment tools for power systems
- Awards: Fellow of the IEEE (2013)

Kipling Gordon Morison is an electrical engineer with BC Hydro in Burnaby, British Columbia. Morison was named a Fellow of the Institute of Electrical and Electronics Engineers (IEEE) in 2013 for his contributions to on-line stability assessment tools for power systems.
