= James Morison (physician) =

British quack-physician (1770–1840)

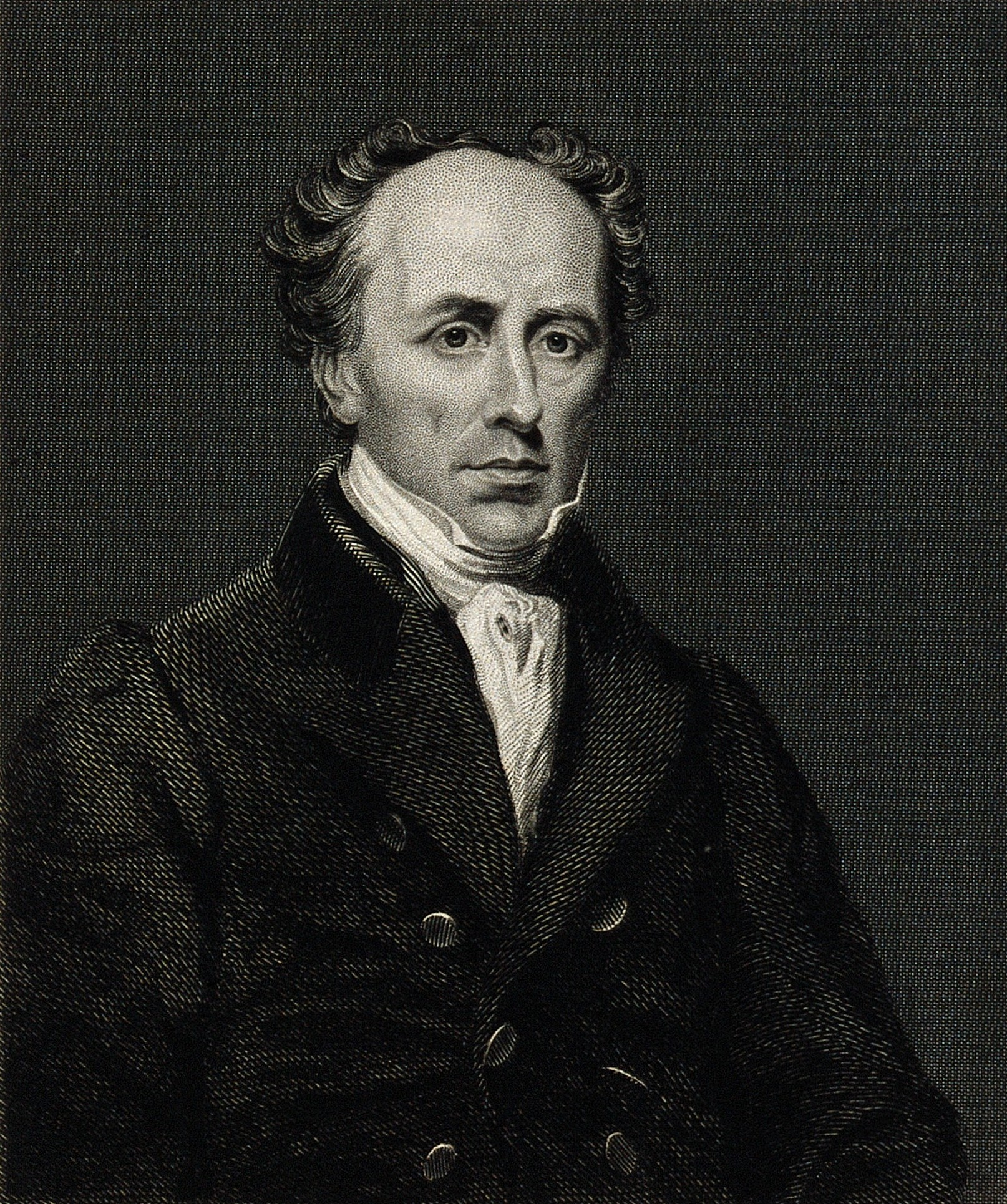
- Born: 1770; Bognie, Aberdeenshire
- Died: 3 May 1840 (aged 69–70); Paris
- Occupation: Quack physician

James Morison (1770 – 3 May 1840) was a British quack-physician who sold Hygeian Vegetable Universal Medicine, a patent medicine marketed as a cure-all.

== Life ==
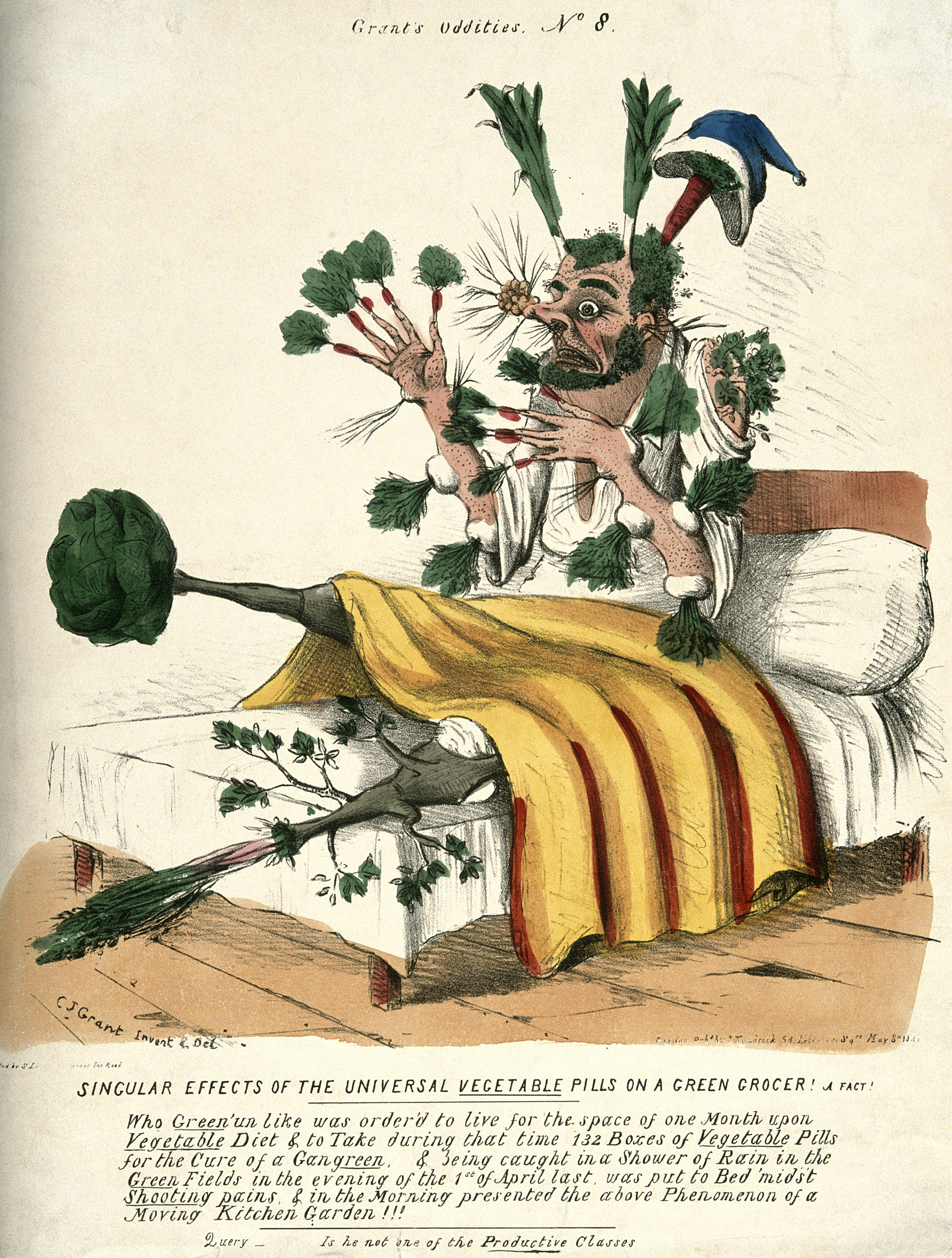
Satirical coloured lithograph (C. J. Grant, 1831) depicting a man who has overdosed on James Morison's Vegetable Pills. Wellcome Library collections.

Morison was born at Bognie, Aberdeenshire, in 1770, the youngest son of Alexander Morison, 4th Baron of Bognie. After studying at Aberdeen University and Hanau in Germany, he established himself at Riga as a merchant, and subsequently in the West Indies, where he acquired property. Ill-health obliged him to return to Europe, and about 1814 he settled at Bordeaux.

After "thirty-five years' inexpressible suffering", and experimenting with every imaginable course of medical treatment, he accomplished "his own extraordinary cure" about 1822 by the simple expedient of swallowing a few vegetable pills of his own compounding at bed-time and a glass of lemonade in the morning. His success led him to set up in 1825 as the vendor of what he called "vegetable universal medicines", commonly known as "Morison's Pills", of which the principal ingredient was said to be gamboge. His medicines soon became highly popular, especially in the west of England, and in 1828 he opened an establishment for their sale in Hamilton Place, New Road, London, which he dignified with the title of "The British College of Health".

Morison believed that bad blood was the cause of all disease and that diarrhea induced by high doses of laxatives was the only cure. He advertised his pills as capable of curing all disease. He bought a pleasant residence at Finchley, Middlesex, called Strawberry Vale Farm, but later lived in Paris. It was said that the profits from the sale of his medicines in France alone were sufficient to cover his expenditure there. From 1830 to 1840, he paid £60,000 to the British government for medicine stamps.

In 1836, he received heavy criticism as an apothecary owner named Robert Salmon was indicted on charges of manslaughter of one John M'Kenzie after he died from an overdose of Morison's pills caused by Salmon.

Morison died in Paris on 3 May 1840. His body was interred within a substantial mausoleum in Kensal Green Cemetery, which was renovated in 2022.

== Personal life ==
James Morison married twice, firstly to Anne Victoire de La Marre, Baroness of Remiremont. They had three daughters (Anna Jacquette Morison, Catherine Morison and Caroline Morison) and two sons, who were Capt. Alexander Morison of Larghan (later the 8th Baron of Bognie and Mountblairy) and John Morison (later the 9th Baron of Bognie and Mountblairy). The brothers developed their father's pill empire, which continued to operate from the British College of Health. The only surviving child of James' second marriage with Clara Cotter (only daughter of Captain Cotter of the Royal Navy) was James Augustus Cotter Morison.

== Works ==
Morison's writings were essentially advertisements for his nostrum. They included:

- Some Important Advice to the World (with supplement entitled More New Truths), 1825
- A Letter Addressed to the Honorable the Court of Directors of the United East India Company; proposing an Easy and Safe Remedy for Prevention and Cure of the Cholera Morbus of India ..., 1825
- The Hygeian Treatment of the Most Prevalent Diseases of India, and of Warm Climates Generally, 1836

His essays were collected together in a volume called Morisoniana, or Family Adviser of the British College of Health (2nd edition 1829; 3rd edition 1831), which was translated into several European languages. Prefixed to the volume is a portrait of the author from a picture by Clint.

== Popular culture ==
- In Robert Wilkie's farce, the Yalla Gaiters (1840), the hero is fascinated by the vocal powers of a countryman who is singing a ballad in praise of Morison's "Vegetable Pills"; the verses are printed in Notes and Queries.
- Thomas Carlyle's Past and Present (1843) makes frequent scornful references to Morison's pills.
- The pills' endurance is mentioned in Robert Louis Stevenson's (1885) More New Arabian Nights: The Dynamiter..
