= John Morison (bacteriologist) =

Dr John Morison FRSE CIE (1879–1971) was a 20th-century British physician prominent in the field of bacteriophage.

== Life ==
He was born in Rajshahi (now part of Bangladesh) on 6 November 1879 the son of Dr Donald Morison who had come to India as a medical missionary with his wife in 1878.

John returned to his parents home country of Scotland for education at Glasgow High School and then George Watson's School in Edinburgh. Then went to study medicine at Glasgow University, graduating MB ChB in 1902. After some practical experience (probably at Glasgow Royal Infirmary he joined the Indian Medical Service and returned to the country of his birth in 1906. He rose to be Director of the Pasteur Institute in Rangoon. In this role in 1927 he encountered the famed microbiologist Prof Felix d'Herelle, who engendered in him a love of bacteriophages.

In 1932 he was created a commander of the Order of the Indian Empire by King George V. In 1937 he was elected a fellow of the Royal Society of Edinburgh. His proposers were Anderson Gray McKendrick, William Glen Liston, Percy Samuel Lelean, and John Du Plessis Langrishe.

He retired from the Indian Medical Service in 1934 and returned to Scotland in 1935 where he then undertook research on behalf of the Royal College of Physicians of Edinburgh.

He died in Edinburgh on 21 February 1971 aged 91.

== Family ==
In 1907 he married Annie Macdonald McLean. They had no children.
