= James Augustus Cotter Morison =

English essayist and historian (1832–1888)

James Cotter Morison
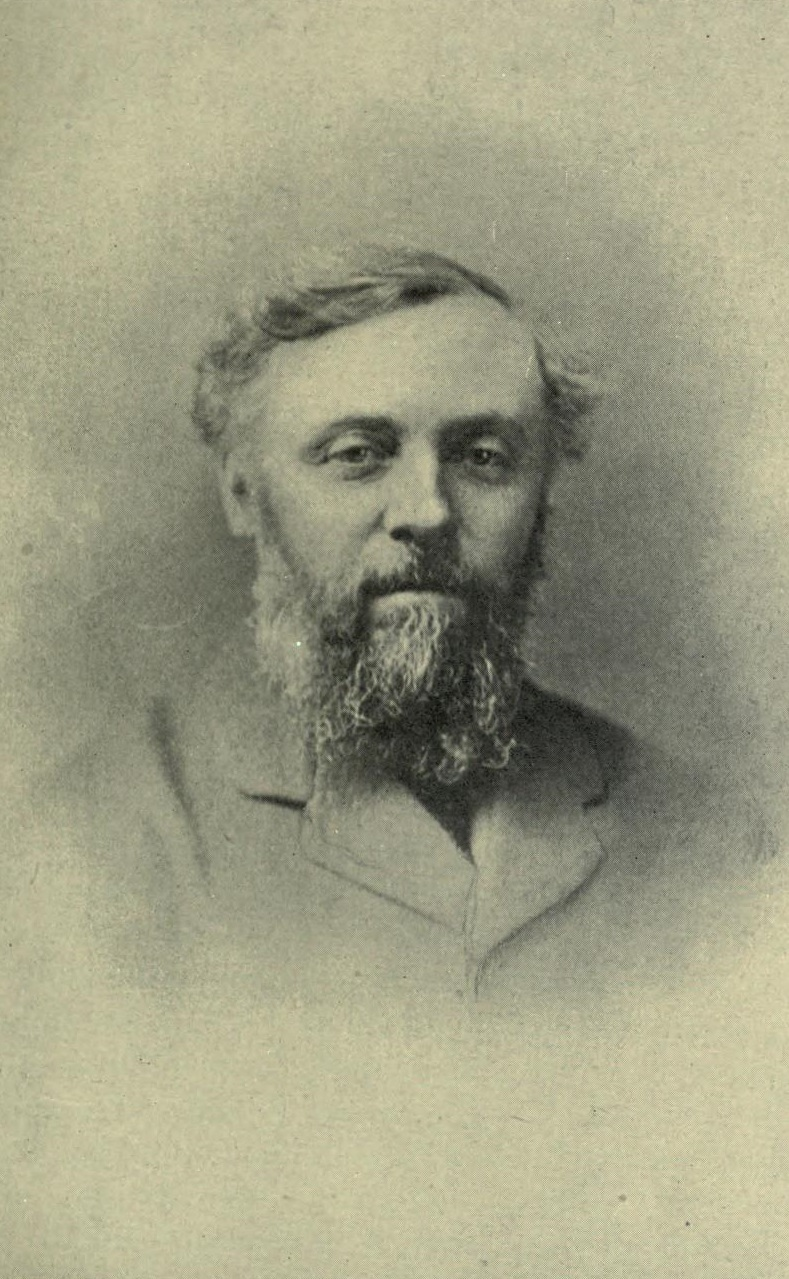
- Born: James Augustus Cotter Morison; April 20, 1832; London, England
- Died: February 26, 1888 (aged 55); FitzJohn Avenue, London, England
- Education: Highgate School
- Alma mater: Lincoln College, Oxford
- Occupations: Essayist, historian
- Children: 3 including Theodore Morison
- Relatives: George Virtue (father-in-law)
- Writing career
- Period: Victorian era
- Subjects: History, biography, positivism
- Literary movement: Positivism

James Augustus Cotter Morison (20 April 1832 – 26 February 1888), was an English essayist and historian, born in London.

== Early years ==
His father, James Morison, had made a large fortune as the inventor and proprietor of "Morison's Pills", settling in Paris until his death in 1840. Thus, Cotter Morison acquired not only an acquaintance with the French language, but a profound sympathy with France and French institutions.

He was educated at Highgate School and Lincoln College, Oxford. Here he fell under the influence of Mark Pattison, to whom his impressionable nature perhaps owed a certain over-fastidiousness that characterised his whole career. He also made the acquaintance of the leading English Positivists, to whose opinions he became an ardent convert. Yet he retained a strong sympathy with the Roman Catholic religion, and at one time spent several weeks in a Catholic monastery.

== Career ==
One other great influence appears in Life of St Bernard, which Morison published in 1863. The book is dedicated to his friend Carlyle. Meanwhile, he had been a regular contributor to The Literary Gazette, edited by his friend John Morley, and then to The Saturday Review.

In 1868, he published a pamphlet entitled Irish Grievances shortly stated. In 1878, he published a volume on Gibbon in the Men of Letters series. This he followed up in 1882 with his Macaulay in the same series.

== Family ==
In 1861, Morison married Frances Virtue (d.1878), the daughter of publisher George Virtue. They had three children: Theodore Morison, a principal of Mohammedan Anglo-Oriental College from 1899 to 1905 which later on became Aligarh Muslim University and member of the Council of India from 1906; and daughters Helen Cotter, and Margaret.

== Later life ==
In later life, he resided for some years in Paris. Towards the close of his life, he meditated a work showing the application of positivist principles to conduct. Failing health compelled him to abandon the second or constructive part: the first, he published in 1887 under the title of The Service of Man.

He died at his house in Fitz John Avenue, London, on 26 February 1888.
