= Theodore Morison =

British educationalist

Sir Theodore Morison KCSI KCIE
- Born: 9 May 1863; Malta
- Died: 14 February 1936 (aged 72); Paris, France
- Education: Trinity College, Cambridge (B.A., 1885)
- Occupation: Educationalist

Sir Theodore Morison KCSI KCIE (9 May 1863 – 14 February 1936) was a British educationalist who served as a member of the Council of India and director of the University of London Institute in Paris. He is best known as an interpreter of Muslim life in India.

== Early life and education ==
Morison was born in Malta to James Augustus Cotter Morison and Frances Virtue (d. 1878), the daughter of publisher George Virtue. He had two sisters, Helen Cotter and Margaret.

Morison was educated at Westminster School and Trinity College, Cambridge, graduating in 1885.

== Career ==
After completing his education, Morison joined the Department of Education. He was appointed as an educational advisor to young rulers of Chattarpur (Bundelkhand) and Charkhari (Hamirpur) and subsequently moved to India.

He was the principal of Muhammadan Anglo-Oriental College from 1899-1905 and a member of the Council of India from 1906. He was the principal of College of Sciences at Durham University from 1919-1929. He was also the principal of Armstrong College. He was also the vice-chancellor of Durham University from 1924-1926.

== Association with Aligarh Movement ==
In 1899, he was appointed as a professor of English at M.A.O. College, serving until 1905. In 1899, he went to England for vacation and resigned from his teaching at M.A.O. College. On 2 September 1899, Principal Theodore Beck died in Shimla, and M.A.O. College offered the job of principal to Morison; he accepted and started the position on 29 October 1899. The 5-year tenure of Prof. Morison as Mohammedan Anglo-Oriental College Principal was a distinctive period for Mohammedan Anglo-Oriental College. He paid much attention to the educational upliftment of Mohammedan Anglo-Oriental College. He paid special attention to the discipline of MAO College and established the Proctorial System at Mohammedan Anglo-Oriental College. Hostel life of MAO College became disciplined and peaceful. He took keen interest in the discipline and hygiene of the students’ community. The college discipline was in good shape during his tenure as Principal. He established the Proctorial system in the college and appointed Mir Wilayat Hussain as Proctor. He enforced students’ 24-hour timetable. He equally enforced discipline among his staff and never tolerated indiscipline in their teachings and schedules. His disciplined approach paid off, and the college results were improved, and student strength started growing. In 1899. when he joined as principal, student strength was 465, but in 1903 it became 713. At the same time, the performance of the students was also on the rise. From 1900 to 1904, the rate of success in B.A. examinations was between 71% and 79%. Morison paid attention to other activities of students and promoted The Siddons’ Club. To improve Arabic conversation and communication, he established "Lahjatul-Adab". He also established "Anjuman Urdu-e-Moalla" to promote writing and oratory skills among college students.

Morison also paid attention to the religious studies. He created a position of Dean of Theology. He promoted the Darse-Quran program, which used to be given by Allama Shibli in the Strachey Hall and asked Nazim-e-Diniyat, Maulana Abdullah Ansari, to continue. Principal Morison also paid attention to sports. He had a keen interest in riding, so he played a key role to establish The MAO College Riding Club in 1893. Due to his interest in riding, he was also known as "Sipaahi Morison".

He also started an Employment Bureau to help the students secure jobs. He used to keep student records with his personal remarks so that, upon the request of the government, he could furnish the records to help the students.

Principal Morison was also appointed as Finance Secretary of Mohammedan Anglo-Oriental College. He helped a lot to improve the financial condition of the college.

He was also elected as President of Muhammadan Educational Conference in December, 1904 at Aligarh. In 1905, he took early retirement from MAO College and moved back to England. Even then, he was a part of the Aligarh Movement and always took keen interest in helping MAO College and the Aligarh Movement. He made several visits to MAO College from England and proved his belief of teacher taught relationship. For his contributions, key role, and active participation in the Aligarh Movement, the MAO College Board of Trustees elected him as a Visitor to MAO College.

After 1920, when Mohammedan Anglo-Oriental College became Aligarh Muslim University, Morison Court hostel and Morison Road were named for him on the campus.

The Morison medal was given to the student of MA History, standing first. It was endowed by the staff of MAO College in honour of its Morison. It was a silver medal with a gold border.

== Later life and death ==
In 1933, Morison moved to Paris to become director of the University of London Institute in Paris. He died at his flat in Paris in 1936. In 1895, he married Margaret, daughter of barrister and politician Arthur Cohen.

== Works ==
- "Indian Education" . The Empire and the century. London: John Murray. 1905. pp. 696–706.
