= John Morison (Banffshire MP) =

British politician (1757 – 1835)

The Much Honoured Baron of Bognie and Mountblairy
- Born: John Morison; 1757
- Died: 12 February 1835 (aged 77–78); London, UK
- Resting place: Mountblairy, UK
- Title: Baron
- Spouse: Jane Fraser
- Children: Alexander Morison, 7th Baron of Bognie and Mountblairy
- Parents: Alexander Morison, 4th Baron of Bognie (father); Catharine Duff (mother)

John Morison, 6th Baron of Bognie and Mountblairy, (1757 – 12 February 1835) was a British politician who sat in the House of Commons as the Member of Parliament (MP) for Banffshire, Scotland, between 1827 and 1832. He was the second son of Alexander Morison, 4th Baron of Bognie, and Catharine Duff.

During the 1780s and 1790s, John was occupied as a merchant in Riga, before acquiring the lands of Auchintoul (Aberchirder) in 1799. John married Jane Fraser, daughter of Alexander Fraser (8th of Strichen). He was known primarily as John Morison of Auchintoul, though he did succeed his elder brother as 6th Baron of Bognie and Mountblairy for the final four months of his life.

Parliament of the United Kingdom
Preceded by James Duff, 4th Earl Fife	Member of Parliament for Banffshire; 1827–1832	Succeeded by George Ferguson
Baronage of Scotland
Preceded by Theodore Morison	Baron of Bognie; 1834-1835	Succeeded by Alexander Morison
