= Baron of Bognie =

Barony of Bognie held with Barony of Mountblairy
- Creation date: 1635
- Creation: Baronage of Scotland
- First holder: Alexander Morison, 1st Baron of Bognie
- Present holder: Alexander Morison, 14th Baron of Bognie and Mountblairy
- Heir apparent: Conner Morison, Yr. of Bognie and Mountblairy
- Subsidiary titles: Laird of Frendraught
- Status: Extant
- Motto: SUNT TRIA HAEC UNUM (These three are one); UNO ICTU (With one blow)
- Dynastic title held by 14 incumbents of the same family

Baron of Bognie is a title of nobility in the Baronage of Scotland, historically associated with the Morison family and Bognie Estate in Aberdeenshire. The title was granted in 1635, in the aftermath of the Fire of Frendraught (1630), when the lands of Bognie were chartered by Sir James Crichton of Frendraught to Alexander Morison of Bognie.

== History ==
Bognie Castle was most likely built in the 1660s by the Morisons of Bognie when they lived at Bognie House. However, there is no evidence of the Morisons ever inhabiting it. This is most likely due to the subsequent acquisition of Frendraught after the marriage of George Morison, 2nd Baron of Bognie, and Christian Urquhart, Viscountess Frendraught (the widow of James Crichton, 2nd Viscount Frendraught), around 1676. Thereafter, the Morisons became the Lairds of Frendraught; the title Viscount Frendraught being held by the Crichtons until it was attainted in 1690. The British royal family can claim direct descent from the early Morisons of Bognie through the maternal line of Lady Diana Spencer, Princess of Wales. The Barony of Bognie has been held with the Barony of Mountblairy, associated with Mountblairy Estate in Aberdeenshire (former Banffshire), since the acquisition of the latter from Major-General Andrew Hay in 1812.

== Barons of Bognie (1635) ==
- Alexander Morison, 1st Baron of Bognie (1590–1660)
- George Morison, 2nd Baron of Bognie (1640–1699)
- Theodore Morison, 3rd Baron of Bognie (1685–1766)
- Alexander Morison, 4th Baron of Bognie (1724–1801)
- Theodore Morison, 5th Baron of Bognie and Mountblairy (1750–1834)
- John Morison MP, 6th Baron of Bognie and Mountblairy (1757–1835)
- Alexander Morison DL, 7th Baron of Bognie and Mountblairy (1802–1874)
- Capt. Alexander de La Marre Morison, 8th Baron of Bognie and Mountblairy (1809–1879)
- John Morison, 9th Baron of Bognie and Mountblairy (1812–1886)
- Lt. Col. Frederick de La Marre Morison DL, 10th Baron of Bognie and Mountblairy (1842–1911)
- Capt. Alexander Edward Forbes Morison DL, 11th Baron of Bognie and Mountblairy (1874–1932)
- Lt. Duncan Maitland Morison, 12th Baron of Bognie and Mountblairy (1885–1956)
- Alexander Gordon Morison, 13th Baron of Bognie and Mountblairy (1920–2013)
- Alexander Gordon Morison, 14th Baron of Bognie and Mountblairy (1952-)

The heir apparent is Dr Conner Alexander Grant Morison, Younger of Bognie and Mountblairy (1997-).

== Heraldic insignia ==
The Shield of Morison of Bognie is defined as:

Azure, three Saracens' heads conjoined on one neck Argent, the uppermost face looking to the chief and affixed by a wreath Argent and Azure to the other two, which turn to the dexter and sinister.

The associated Standard comprises a serpent curling upwards and forwards Vert upon a chapeau Gules furred Ermine, depicted three times. The liveries are Argent and Azure, with the Arms of Morison of Bognie in the hoist. The motto is displayed on bands Vert in letters Argent.

== See also ==
- Bognie Castle
- Frendraught
- Viscount Frendraught
- James Morison, the Hygeist
- James Augustus Cotter Morison
- Sir Theodore Morison
