= Gilmore (surname) =

Gilmore and Gillmore are surnames with several origins and meanings.

The name can be of Irish, in particular from Ulster, or Scottish Highlands origin, Anglicised from the Gaelic Mac Gille Mhoire (Scottish Gaelic), Mac Giolla Mhuire (Ulster Irish Gaelic). The name was a patronymic name meaning "servant of (the Virgin) Mary".

Gilmore is an alternative, or sept, of Clan Morrison from Scotland, known as MacGilleMhoire in Scottish Gaelic. Gillmore has been noted as a derivative of the Scottish Gaelic Gille-mòr, meaning "great servant", a name given to the armour-bearer to a Highland chief, or more prosaically to the servant or henchman of a chief.

Another origin of the surname Gilmore is Irish, with two separate meanings. In County Armagh, the name is an Anglicised form of Mac Giolla Mhura, meaning "servant of St. Mura" (of Fahan, County Donegal). In County Sligo, Gilmore is an Anglicisation of Mac Giolla Mhir, meaning "son of the spirited lad".

== People surnamed Gilmore or Gillmore ==
- Aaron Gilmore (born 1973), New Zealand politician
- Ada Gilmore (1883–1955), American watercolorist and printmaker
- Alan C. Gilmore (born 1944), New Zealand astronomer
- Alexander Gilmore Cochran (1846–1928), American politician
- Alexie Gilmore (born 1976), American actress
- Alfred Gilmore (1812–1858), American politician
- Art Gilmore (1912–2010), American voice actor
- Artis Gilmore (born 1949), American basketball player
- Bernard Gilmore (1937–2013), American composer
- Bob Gilmore (1961–2015), Northern Irish musicologist
- Boyd Gilmore (1905 or 1910–1976), American Delta blues singer, guitarist and songwriter
- Brenda Gilmore (born 1952), American politician
- Brian Gilmore (1933–1959), Australian footballer
- Bryan Gilmore (born 1978), American footballer
- Charles W. Gilmore (1874–1945), American paleontologist
- Craig Gilmore (born 1968), American actor
- Daniel Gilmore (born 1983), Australian footballer
- David Gilmore (born 1964), American jazz guitarist
- David Gillmore (1934–1999), British diplomat
- Eamon Gilmore (born 1955), Irish politician
- Edward Gilmore (1867–1924), American politician
- Grover Gilmore (baseball) (1888–1919), American baseball player
- Elka Gilmore (1960–2019), American chef
- Eugene Allen Gilmore (1871–1953), American lawyer, diplomat and politician
- Florence Magruder Gilmore (1881–1945), American author
- Frederick Gilmore (1887–1969), American boxer
- Gail Gilmore (1937–2014), Canadian actress and dancer
- Gary Gilmore (1940–1977), American murderer
- Gary Gilmore (baseball), American baseball coach
- George Gilmore (1898–1995), IRA leader
- Georgia Gilmore (1920–1990), American civil rights activist
- Glen Gilmore (polo player), Australian polo player
- Glenda Gilmore, American historian
- Grant Gilmore (1910–1982), American law professor
- Greg Gilmore (born 1962), American musician
- Grover C. Gilmore (born 1950), American psychologist
- Harold LeBruce Gilmore (1912–1996), American politician
- Helen Gilmore (1900–1947), American actress
- Howard W. Gilmore (1902–1943), US Navy submarine commander and Medal of Honor recipient
- Ian Gilmore (born 1947), British hepatologist
- Inez Haynes Gillmore (1873–1970), American feminist author
- Jared S. Gilmore (born 2000), American child actor
- Jennifer Gilmore (born 1970), American novelist
- Jill Gilmore (born 1973), New Zealand footballer
- Jim Gilmore (born 1949), American politician
- Jimmie Dale Gilmore (born 1945), American country singer
- Joe Gilmore (1922–2015), barman
- Joey Gilmore (1944–2024), American electric blues and soul blues singer
- John Gilmore (disambiguation) various people including:
- John Gilmore (activist) (born 1955), co-founder of the Electronic Frontier Foundation and Cygnus Solutions
- John Gilmore (musician) (1931–1995), American jazz saxophonist
- John Gilmore (politician) (1780–1845), American politician from Pennsylvania
- John Gilmore (tenor) (1950–1994), American operatic tenor
- John Gilmore (writer) (1935–2016), American true crime writer, author of Hollywood memoirs, and novelist
- John C. Gilmore (1837–1922), American Civil War soldier
- John S. Gilmore, American sociologist
- John Gilmore (American football) (John H. Gilmore, born 1979), American football player
- John W. Gilmore (1872–1942), American agronomist, educator and academic administrator
- Joseph A. Gilmore (1811–1867), American railroad superintendent
- Julianna Gilmore, birth name of Christian singer Julianna Zobrist (born 1984)
- June Gilmore (1922–1980), American baseball player
- Laurie Gilmore, American author
- Len Gilmore (1917–2011), American baseball player
- Lillian Gilmore (1909–1982) American actress
- Lyman Gilmore (1874–1951), American aviation pioneer
- Margalo Gillmore (1897–1986), English-born American actress
- Margaret Gilmore (born 1956), British journalist
- Maria McIlvaine Gillmore (1871–1965), American writer and missionary
- Marion Gilmore (1909–1984), American artist
- Martha Gilmore, (born 1980), American planetary geologist
- Marshall Gilmore (born 1931), American Methodist bishop
- Dame Mary Gilmore (1865–1962), Australian poet and journalist
- Matthew Gilmore (born 1972), Belgian-Australian track cyclist
- Mikal Gilmore (born 1951), American music journalist
- Patrick Gilmore (actor) (born 1976), Canadian actor
- Patrick Gilmore (1829–1892), Irish-born American composer and bandmaster
- Peter Gilmore (1931–2013), British actor
- Peter H. Gilmore (born 1958), American author; administrator of the Church of Satan
- Quincy Adams Gillmore (1825–1888), American author, civil engineer and general
- Rachna Gilmore (1953–2021), Canadian children's writer
- Rebecca Gilmore (born 1979), Australian diver
- Richie Gilmore (c. 1966), American motorsport executive
- Rochelle Gilmore (born 1981), Australian racing cyclist
- Samuel Louis Gilmore (1859–1910), American politician
- Scott Gilmore (born 1971), social entrepreneur
- Stephon Gilmore (born 1990), American football player
- Steve Gilmore (admiral) (born 1961), Australian naval officer
- Stuart Gilmore (1909–1971), American film editor
- Susan Gilmore (born 1954), English actress
- T. J. Gilmore (born 1949), Irish Gaelic footballer
- Ted Gilmore (born 1967), American football player and coach
- Thea Gilmore (born 1979), English musician
- Thomas R. Gilmore (1825–1899), American politician
- Toby Gilmore (1745–1812), African American soldier in the American Revolution
- Tom Gilmore (American football) (born 1964), America football player and coach
- Tom Gilmore (ice hockey) (born 1948), Canadian ice hockey player
- Tom Gilmore (North Carolina politician) (1936–2019), American nurseryman and politician
- Tom Gilmore (property developer) (born 1953), American property developer
- Tom Gilmore (rugby league) (born 1994), English rugby league footballer
- Tom Gilmore Jr. (1946–2024), Australian politician
- Tom Gilmore Sr. (1908–1994), Australian politician
- Tommy Joe Gilmore (born 1950), Galway Gaelic footballer
- Tony Gilmore (1949–2018), Australian rules footballer
- Vanessa Gilmore (born 1956), American jurist
- Virginia Gilmore (1919–1986), American actress
- Voit Gilmore (1918–2005), American politician
- Walt Gilmore (born 1947), American basketball player
- Wilky Gilmore (1940–1993), African-American basketball player
- William Gilmore (rower) (1895–1969), American rower
- William H. Gilmore (1839–1910), American politician
- William J. Gilmore (1821–1896), American judge
- William Gilmore Simms (1806–1870), American poet, novelist and historian
- Woody Gilmore, Dragster and funny car chassis builder (1933 - 2020)

== Fictional characters ==
- Jim Gilmore, protagonist of Ernest Hemingway's early short story "Up in Michigan," written in 1921 and revised in 1938.
- Hugh Gilmore, alter ego alias of pulp magazine character Jethro Dumont as The Green Lama
- The title family in the comedy-drama series Gilmore Girls
  - Lorelai Gilmore and Rory Gilmore, mother-and-daughter protagonists
  - Emily Gilmore, Lorelai's mother and Rory's grandmother
  - Richard Gilmore, Lorelai's father and Rory's grandfather.
- Happy Gilmore, the title character of the Adam Sandler movie Happy Gilmore.
- Shaun Gilmore, a recurring character in the first season of Critical Role, a powerful sorcerer and ally of Vox Machina who runs Gilmore's Glorious Goods, a store selling magical items and artifacts.
- Hannah Gilmore, a character in the British soap opera Coronation Street

== See also ==
- Gillmor
- Morrison
- Clan Morrison
- Gilmor
- Gilmore (disambiguation)
- Gilmour (surname)
- Gilmer (surname)
- Dùn Èistean
- Gilmore Girls
