= John Gilmore =

John Gilmore may refer to:

- John Gilmore (activist) (born 1955), co-founder of the Electronic Frontier Foundation and Cygnus Solutions
- John Gilmore (musician) (1931–1995), American jazz saxophonist
- John Gilmore (politician) (1780–1845), American politician from Pennsylvania
- John Gilmore (tenor) (1950–1994), American operatic tenor
- John Gilmore (writer) (1935–2016), American true crime writer, author of Hollywood memoirs, and novelist
- John C. Gilmore (1837–1922), American Civil War soldier
- John S. Gilmore, American sociologist
- John Gilmore (American football) (John H. Gilmore, born 1979), American football player
- John W. Gilmore (1872–1942), American agronomist, educator and academic administrator

== See also ==
- John Gilmour (disambiguation)
- Gilmore (surname)
- John Gilmore Riley House, historic house in Florida
