= William Freudenburg =

American sociologist

William R. Freudenburg
- Born: 2 November 1951; Madison, Nebraska, United States
- Died: 28 December 2010 (aged 59); Santa Barbara, California, United States
- Education: Yale University
- Known for: work on Risk perception, Social disruption and Environmental degradation
- Spouse: Sarah Stewart
- Scientific career
- Fields: Sociology, Environmental studies
- Workplaces: University of California, Santa Barbara; University of Wisconsin-Madison

William Robert ('Bill') Freudenburg, (2 November 1951 – 28 December 2010) was an environmental sociologist and social theorist, best known for his work in rural sociology on the topics of risk perception, social disruption, and the causes of environmental degradation. Born in Madison, Nebraska, raised in West Point, Nebraska, he was educated at the University of Nebraska–Lincoln and Yale University. Freudenburg was a professor of sociology at a number of universities; his ultimate position was as Dehlsen Professor of Environmental Studies at the University of California, Santa Barbara. He died at his home in Santa Barbara, of cholangiocarcinoma (cancer of the bile duct).

Much of Freudenburg's research dealt with the relationship between society and the environment, often in rural communities. Although not opposed to forms of environmentalism which emphasize reducing one's impact on the environment (such as recycling), Freudenburg focused less on the role of consumers and more on the role of regulatory structure and actions of industry, emphasizing the socially structured sources of environmental impacts. He was involved in both rural and environmental sociology, and was elected and served as president of the Rural Sociological Society in 2004–2005, and at the time of his death was president-elect of The Association for Environmental Studies and Sciences (AESS), an organization which he helped found.

== Education and career ==
Freudenburg completed his undergraduate work at the University of Nebraska–Lincoln and then earned three graduate degrees, including his PhD, from Yale University. He began his professional career at Washington State University, then moved to the University of Wisconsin, where he spent most of his professional career. While he was still on the faculty at Wisconsin, he was nominated for an endowed professorship at the University of California, Santa Barbara, which he accepted, and he worked at UCSB until his death.

== Theory of double diversion ==
Freudenburg published a number influential ideas, but his central focus in recent years was on what he called the double diversion. Although in his latter years he taught in the program established in part by Garrett Hardin, and he often stressed his high regard for Hardin's work, the predictions that derive from Freudenburg's double diversion work are contrary to those associated with Hardin's "tragedy of the commons." Rather than being due mainly to the actions of individual consumers, Freudenburg argued, much or most of all environmental harm is actually due to a small number of organized producers. Contrary to the notion that environmental protection is bad for the economy and jobs, the worst sources of environmental harm are commonly due to a surprisingly small fraction of all economic activity—and to an even smaller fraction of the jobs. In the first peer-reviewed article in which this perspective was spelled out, for example, Freudenburg found that the majority of all toxic emissions in the U.S. economy came from industries that were responsible for only about 5% of the gross national product—and just 1.4% of the nation's jobs.

- The March 2012 issue of the Journal of Environmental Studies and Sciences featured a "Symposium on the Legacy of William R. Freudenburg".
