= Gilmar (disambiguation) =

Gilmar dos Santos Neves (1930–2013) is a Brazilian football (soccer) goalkeeper.

Gilmar may also refer to:

- Gilmar Antônio Batista (born 1970), Brazilian footballer
- Gilmar Jones (born 1986), Surinamese badminton player and coach
- Gilmar Jorge dos Santos (born 1971), Brazilian footballer
- Gilmar Lobato da Rocha (born 1973), Brazilian-Portuguese footballer
- Gilmar Mayo (born 1969), Colombian high jumper
- Gilmar Mendes (born 1955), Brazilian attorney and judge
- Gilmar Pisas (born 1971), Curaçaoan politician
- Gilmar Rinaldi (born 1959), Brazilian footballer
- Gilmar Santos (born 1970), Brazilian middle-distance runner
- Gilmar Silva (born 1984), Brazilian footballer
- Gilmar Tavinho (born 1995), Santomean footballer
- Gilmar Fubá (1975–2021), Brazilian footballer

== Other ==
- Gilmar Records, record label based in Encino, California

== See also ==
- Gilmer (disambiguation)
