= Gilmer =

Gilmer may refer to:

== Places in the United States ==
- Gilmer, Illinois
- Gilmer, Roanoke, Virginia
- Gilmer, Texas
- Gilmer, Washington
- Gilmer, West Virginia
- Gilmer County, Georgia
- Gilmer County, West Virginia
- Gilmer Township, Adams County, Illinois
- Lake Gilmer, Texas

== Other uses ==
- Gilmer (surname)
- USS Gilmer, a World War II destroyer and a patrol boat
