= Gilmer (surname) =

Gilmer is a surname. Notable people with the surname include:

- Alexander Gilmer (1829–1906), American sawmill owner
- Dixie Gilmer (1901–1954), U.S. Representative from Oklahoma
- Elizabeth Gilmer (1880–1960), New Zealand social worker, educationist and horticulturist
- Elizabeth Meriwether Gilmer (1861–1951), American columnist better known as Dorothy Dix
- Dr. George Gilmer, Sr. (1700–1757), American politician, mayor of Williamsburg, Virginia
- George Rockingham Gilmer (1790–1859), American politician
- Harry Gilmer (1926–2016), College Football Hall of Fame member and National Football League player
- Jeremy Francis Gilmer (1818–1883), American soldier, Chief Engineer of the Confederate States Army during the American Civil War
- John Adams Gilmer (1805–1868), American politician and brother of Jeremy Gilmer
- Thomas Walker Gilmer (1802–1844), American statesman
- Vince Gilmer, American physician and convicted murderer
- William Gilmer (1863–1955), American Naval officer and Governor of Guam

== See also ==
- Gilmore (surname)
- Gilmer (disambiguation)
