= John Gilmour =

John Gilmour may refer to:

- Sir John Gilmour of Craigmillar (1605–1671), Scottish judge, Lord President of the Court of Session 1661–1671
- John Taylor Gilmour (1837–1917), Canadian physician, journalist and politician
- Sir John Gilmour, 1st Baronet (1845–1920), Scottish Unionist politician
- Sir John Gilmour, 2nd Baronet (1876–1940), Scottish Unionist politician, Home Secretary, Secretary of State for Scotland
- John Inglis Gilmour (1896–1928), Scottish flying ace in World War I
- John Gilmour (footballer) (1901–1963), Scottish footballer (Dundee FC and Scotland)
- John Gilmour (botanist) (1906–1986), British botanist
- Sir John Gilmour, 3rd Baronet (1912–2007), Scottish Conservative Party politician, Member of Parliament for East Fife 1961–1979
- Sir John Gilmour, 4th Baronet (1944–2013), Scottish nobleman
- John Gilmour (ice hockey), (born 1993)
- John Gilmour (cartoonist) (1892–1951), New Zealand cartoonist

== See also ==
- John Gilmore (disambiguation)
