= Raymond Gilmore =

American zoologist

- Raymond M. Gilmore (photo: San Diego Natural History Museum Research Library)
- Born: Raymond Maurice Gilmore; January 1, 1907; Ithaca, New York
- Died: December 31, 1983 (aged 76); San Diego, California
- Scientific career
- Fields: Zoology, Cetology
- Workplaces: Rockefeller Foundation, U.S. Fish and Wildlife Service, San Diego Natural History Museum

Raymond Maurice Gilmore (1 January 1907 - 31 December 1983) was an American zoologist and a recognized authority on whales. He conducted the first census of California gray whales and is credited with creating public interest in their conservation by leading the earliest whale-watching excursions for the San Diego Natural History Museum. Guiding groups of whale-watchers beginning in 1958, Gilmore was the first onboard naturalist in San Diego; he continued his popular excursions for 25 years. Known as the father of whale watching, Gilmore was the leading expert on California gray whales.

== Biography ==
Gilmore was born in Ithaca, New York, on January 1, 1907, the son of Elizabeth M. Hitchcock and agronomist John W. Gilmore. He was raised in Honolulu, Hawai'i and Berkeley, California. Gilmore received both his A.B. degree (1930, Zoology) and his M.A. (1933, Zoology and Anthropology) from the University of California, Berkeley. He was the Virginia Barret Gibbs Scholar at Harvard University (1934-1935), and completed his PhD in zoology at Cornell University in 1942.

From 1935 to 1938, Gilmore worked for the International Health Division of the Rockefeller Foundation as the zoologist on a 65-member team researching jungle yellow fever in the Amazon Basin. He helped to establish an epidemiological research station at Villavicencio, Colombia in 1938, and, working with the Institute of Inter-American Affairs (1941-1943), helped set up research facilities for control of malaria in a rubber collecting area of Guayaramerin in northeast Bolivia. From 1944 to 1945, Gilmore was Curator of Mammals at the National Museum of Natural History (Smithsonian), where he produced important archaeozoological publications on the value of mammal bones in the interpretation of prehistoric cultures. He contributed the chapter "Fauna and Ethnozoology of South America" to Volume 6 of Julian Haynes Steward's Handbook of South American Indians.

From 1946 to 1958, Gilmore worked for the U.S. Fish and Wildlife Service, first in the San Francisco Bay area, and from 1952, on the Scripps Institution of Oceanography campus in La Jolla. In 1954, participating in Carl L. Hubbs's seven-year gray whale breeding survey, Gilmore (with Gifford C. Ewing) confirmed the species' mainland calving sites on the Pacific Coast of Baja California. In 1969, Gilmore led a National Science Foundation research team to Antarctica; on the expedition, the team discovered the breeding grounds of the right whale off the coast of Argentina.

Gilmore's association with the San Diego Natural History Museum began in the early 1950s, and in 1955, he was named a Research Associate in Marine Mammals. Retiring from the Fish and Wildlife Service in 1972, Gilmore expanded his involvement in cetology at the museum, opening the Office of Marine Mammal Information in 1977. He popularized whale conservation and promoted public education via radio, television, popular writing, and guiding public whale-watching excursions from 1958 until his death in 1983.

== Professional Societies ==
- Phi Beta Kappa (Berkeley, 1929)
- Phi Sigma (Berkeley, 1928)
- Sigma Xi (Ithaca, 1942)
- American Society of Mammalogists (1925)
- American Society of Systematic Zoologists (1948)

== Selected publications ==
- Gilmore, Raymond M. (1976). "The Friendly Whales of Laguna San Ignacio". Terra (Los Angeles, Calif.).
- —— (1967). Gray Whales near Yavaros, Southern Sonora, Gulfo de California, Mexico. San Diego, CA.
- Moore, Joseph Curtis; Gilmore, Raymond M. (1965). "A beaked whale new to the western hemisphere". Nature. 205 (4977): 1239–40. Bibcode:1965Natur.205.1239M. doi:10.1038/2051239a0. S2CID 4166592.
- Gilmore, Raymond M. (1962). Bubbles and Other Pilot-Whales. Del Mar, CA: Barley Brae Printers.
- —— (1961). "Whales without Flukes or Flippers". Journal of Mammalogy. 42 (3): 419–20. doi:10.2307/1377062. JSTOR 1377062.
- Mahnken, Thomas; Gilmore, Raymond M. (1960). "Suckerfish on Porpoise". Journal of Mammalogy. 41 (1): 134. doi:10.2307/1376540. JSTOR 1376540.
- Gilmore, Raymond M.; Rice, Dale W. (1960). A Census of the California Gray Whale. Washington, D.C.: U.S. Dept. of Interior, Fish and Wildlife Service.
- Gilmore, Raymond M.; Rice, Dale W. (1959). The California Gray Whale. Seattle, Wash.: [publisher not identified].
- Gilmore, Raymond M. (1958). The Story of the Gray Whale. [San Diego, Calif.?]: [Yale Printing Co.?].
- —— (1957). Whales Aground in Cortés' Sea: Tragic Strandings in the Gulf of California. San Francisco, Calif.: California Academy of Sciences.
- —— (1955). "The Return of the Gray Whale". Scientific American. 192 (1): 62–67. Bibcode:1955SciAm.192a..62G. doi:10.1038/scientificamerican0155-62.
- —— (1949). "The Identification and Value of Mammal Bones from Archeologic Excavations". Journal of Mammalogy. 30 (2): 163–69. doi:10.2307/1375265. JSTOR 1375265. PMID 18121321.
- Boyd, William C.; Bastos D'Avila, Jose; Frenguelli, Joaquin; Gilmore, Raymond M.; Henckel, Carlos; Herzog, Ernesto; Imbelloni, Jose; et al. (1948). Steward, Julian H. (ed.). Handbook of South American Indians: Physical Anthropology, Linguistics and Cultural Geography of South American Indians. Bureau of American Ethnology Bulletin 143. Vol. 6. Washington, D. C.: United States Government Printing Office.
- Gilmore, Raymond M. (1947). "Cyclic Behavior and Economic Importance of the Rata-Muca (oryzomys) in Peru". Journal of Mammalogy. 28 (3): 231–241. doi:10.2307/1375173. JSTOR 1375173.
- —— (1947). "Report on a Collection of Mammal Bones from Archeologic Cave-Sites in Coahuila, Mexico". Journal of Mammalogy. 28 (2): 147–65. doi:10.2307/1375456. JSTOR 1375456.
- —— (1946). "Mammals in Archeological Collections from Southwestern Pennsylvania". Journal of Mammalogy. 27 (3): 227–34. doi:10.2307/1375432. JSTOR 1375432.
- —— (1946). "To Facilitate Cooperation in the Identification of Mammal Bones from Archaeological Sites". American Antiquity. 12 (1): 49–50. doi:10.2307/275814. JSTOR 275814. S2CID 163622140.
- —— (1943). "Mammalogy in an Epidemiological Study of Jungle Yellow Fever in Brazil". Journal of Mammalogy. 24 (2): 144–162. doi:10.2307/1374796. JSTOR 1374796.
- —— (1933). A Systematic and Zoogeographic Study of the Mammalian Genera Citellus, Dicrostonyx, and Microtus in Alaska.
- Hall, E. Raymond; Gilmore, Raymond Maurice (1932). New Mammals from St. Lawrence Island, Bering Sea, Alaska. Berkeley, Calif.: University of California Press.
