= Double diversion =

Theory about environmental harm developed by William Freudenburg

The double diversion is a two-part theory about environmental harm that was developed by William Freudenburg and colleagues beginning in the 1990s, and focusing on "disproportionality" and "distraction." The concept of disproportionality involves the observation that, rather than being a reflection of overall levels of economic activity, the majority of environmental destruction is actually due to a relatively small number of economic actors, which enjoy privileged access to natural resources, "diverting" those resources for the private benefit of the few. Freudenburg's original work on this concept was carried out in conjunction with his colleague from the University of Wisconsin-Madison, Peter Nowak. The reference to the "double" diversion reflects the argument that this first diversion is made possible in large part by the second—the diversion of attention, or distraction, often ironically relying on the widespread but empirically inaccurate belief that environmental harm is economically beneficial to the population as a whole.

== Historical emphasis on individual factors ==
The double diversion differs from previous theories about responsibility for environmental harm, which tend to focus on overall or average levels of environmental harm. The most notable example is Garret Hardin's 1968 article The Tragedy of the Commons, which focuses on the conflict between individual self-interest and what benefits the society as a whole. Hardin illustrates this concept through an example of herders sharing an open stretch of farmland, which results in each individual developing an incentive to increase his individual number of cows. Hardin argued that as a result, all of the individual herders ignore long-term benefits that result from environmental conservation, resulting in "individual rationality leading to a collective tragedy".

This tendency to focus on overall impacts continued into the 1970s and 1980s with the development of the I = PAT equation by Barry Commoner, Paul R. Ehrlich and John Holdren. The formula states that human impact on the environmental equals the product of population, affluence, and technology, without considering that all individuals do not have equal environmental impacts. This is similarly true in the case of William Catton's 1980 book Overshoot: the Ecological Basis of Revolutionary Change, in which Catton emphasizes the argument that all of us have lifestyles that are based upon a time when our carrying capacity exceeded human load. He argues that because we have been unwilling to modify our lifestyles as carrying capacities have been exceeded, subsequent generations are destined to inherit a world of increasing conflict for finite resources Also integral to the individual-emphasis from the writing of this period is the notion of the conflict between economic protection and economic growth. The typical feeling of this period is articulated through O'Connor (1988, 1991), who sees capitalism as relying on prosperity for the legitimization of economic expansion. What occurs as a result, according to O'Connor, is an ever-increasing exploitation of both the environment and workers.

== Disproportionality and distraction ==
According to the double diversion hypothesis, the emphasis on overall or average levels of individual impacts, which many 20th century authors stressed, ultimately missed the importance of the disproportionate impacts that economic outliers can have on the environment. According to Lisa Berry, "For societies where a small fraction of the population consumes many more resources or produces much more pollution than other members, the I = PAT model fails to communicate the vast differences in resource consumption that exist within groups." Freudenburg (2006) traces this emphasis to the fact that most scientists are trained to focus on statistical means. However, according to the double diversion hypothesis, rather than being discarded, the extreme cases need to be the focus of the debate.

When this privileged access is threatened, according to Freudenburg, organized producers use distraction through "privileged accounts" – the repetition of largely unchallenged stories and beliefs that divert attention away from the unequal patterns of resource use. These privileged accounts ultimately get repeated so often that they become "embedded" within our language and thought. If the opposition still refuses to stay silent and challenges them on their inequitable effects on the environment, they engage in a disappearing act, where they do not "respond" as to why their company has the right to profit off public goods, but instead point to the benefits that the populace supposedly receives. As a result, when laws and policies are created, organized interests can expect to receive tangible rewards from the political system, while the remainder of the citizenry can expect to receive mainly symbolic rewards in the form of rhetoric.

== Double diversion in practice ==
The double diversion is a sufficiently new theory for it to not have been tested extensively, but several notable studies suggest that it deserves greater attention. Although no notable counter-examples have yet been provided, their existence is entirely possible.

== In agriculture ==
A case study of disproportionality in agriculture is provided by Peter Nowak and colleagues, who researched the agricultural practices of several thousand farmers in Wisconsin. They discuss how the trend of subsistence farms developing into livestock ranches, where the reuse of manure is discouraged, has increased disproportionality of negative environmental practices. Nowak et al. found that a small number of farmers using non-normative practices had a significantly greater responsibility for environmental damage. This was true regarding the amount of fertilizer used, the degree of erosion from the production of croplands, and the amount of phosphorus that accumulated in watersheds. The majority of the soil test results are in the high or excessively high range for phosphorus values, with a clear sub-set of outliers that have values up to 900% above the sample mean. However, because environmental regulations were crafted for the "average" rather than the exceptional farms, the policies did little to curb the runoff from the few farms that created significantly more than "their share" of the phosphorus problem. Nowak et al. concludes that "we are suggesting that indicators of environmental degradation in this situation […] failed to decrease during the 1976–1994 period because of the increasing important of disproportionate contributions." Disproportionality in agriculture has also been observed in water use, with farmers and organized farm interests in dry western states of the U.S. commonly using 80 percent of those state's water, while only having an economic relevance of 1–3 percent of the total economy. This disproportionate effect signifies that twenty thousand times as many jobs would be created if this same amount of water was used in industry. Nevertheless, the top four percent of all farmers received 55 percent of all federal crop subsidies, with this trend of this disproportionality increasing into the future. Reluctance to challenge this status quo can be explained through diversion via the social multiplier effect: even if a given individual does not work in a given industry, that person's attitudes may be affected by whether his or her friends and relatives do. Therefore, it makes sense that rural resident would be especially reluctant to criticize the industries or facilities they see as providing jobs for their friends and neighbors.

== In industry ==
Disproportionate effects have also been observed within the industrial setting in cases of both between and within-group comparisons. These inequalities can be measured using the Gini coefficient, (which ranges from 0 to 1, with a higher number signifying greater inequality.) Freudenburg (2006) uses this coefficient to establish both between and in-group comparisons of industry toxicity, finding that chemical companies had a level 0.865 in comparison to other industries. However, in-group disproportionality between individual chemical companies was even more substantial, with the 62 chemical company facilities he analyzed producing a Gini coefficient of 0.975. These results are consistent with the Kolmogorov–Smirnov test, which finds that expectations for proportionate relationships between economic activity and environmental harm can consistently be rejected at very high levels of significance.

== Automobile pollution ==
Disproportionality has also been observed by A. Kurniawan and A. Schmidt-Ott, who developed a new sensing method in order to measure emissions of individual cars. As in previous studies by Beaton et al. (1995) and Bishop & Stedman, (1996) they found that contrary to popular belief, a small group of "super polluters" is actually responsible for a disproportionate amount of total emissions. In this particular study, Kurniawan et al. found that 5 percent of the total vehicles accounted for 43 percent of emissions. From these findings, they conclude that "properly maintained vehicles of any age are relatively small contributors to exhaust pollution and that most of the pollution is cause by a small percentage of badly maintained cars." Given these results, they suggest that unlike the current policies of most industrialized countries, the best solution is a targeted repair program that focuses on disproportionate polluters. The benefits of such a policy is demonstrated through are demonstrated by Netherlands where it has been implemented, and the contribution of super-polluters has been greatly diminished. Nonetheless, the failure of other countries to follow their lead has meant that "about half of the present particulate pollution by passenger cars would be avoidable if adequate monitoring would enable enforcement of existing laws"
