= Thomas Alfred Davies =

American businessman, engineer and soldier

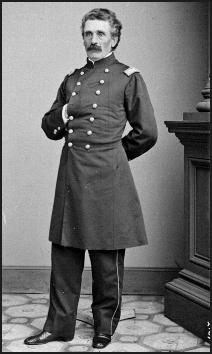
- Thomas Alfred Davies
- Born: December 3, 1809; Black Lake, New York
- Died: August 19, 1899 (aged 89); Ogdensburg, New York
- Burial place: Davies Cemetery, Oswegatchie, New York
- Military career
- Allegiance: United States of America; Union
- Branch: United States Army; Union Army
- Service years: 1829–1831; 1861–1865
- Rank: Brigadier General; Brevet Major General
- Conflicts: American Civil War; Bull Run campaign; 1st Battle of Bull Run; Siege of Corinth; Second Battle of Corinth

Thomas Alfred Davies (December 3, 1809 – August 19, 1899) was an American businessman, engineer, and soldier. He served as a brigadier general in the Union Army during the American Civil War. In 1866, he was nominated and confirmed for appointment to the grade of brevet major general of volunteers, to rank from July 11, 1865. After the war, Davies was a successful realtor as well as an author.

== Early life and career ==
Davies was born in 1809 near Black Lake, located in St. Lawrence County, New York. He spent his childhood and early youth in his father's farm and received common education from the local schools. He entered the United States Military Academy on July 1, 1825, and graduated on July 1, 1829, ranked twenty-fifth. Future high-ranking Confederates in the class of 1829 were Robert E. Lee, Joseph E. Johnston, and Theophilus H. Holmes. Davies was commissioned in the 1st U.S. Infantry on the Wisconsin frontier and as quartermaster at the Military Academy. In 1831, he resigned his commission to practice civil engineering in New York City. He was a merchant in New York from 1841 to the outbreak of the American Civil War in 1861.

== Civil War service ==
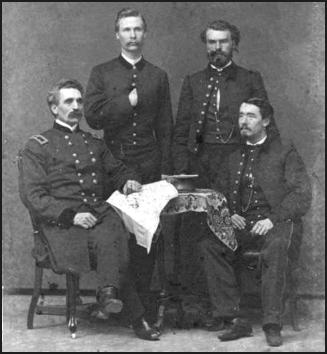
Thomas Davies (seated, left) during the American Civil War

When the American Civil War began in 1861, Davies chose to follow his native state and the Union cause. He was elected colonel of the 16th New York Infantry Regiment on May 15. Davies led a brigade during the First Battle of Bull Run that July. He then commanded the 10th Brigade in the defenses of Washington, D.C., until March 7, 1862. On that date, Davies was promoted to brigadier general in the Union Army, and he was transferred to the Army of the Tennessee in the Western Theater.

In April and May 1862, Davies was engaged in the Siege of Corinth as a division commander. He took part in the Second Battle of Corinth on October 3–4, 1862, also in division command. Davies was assigned to command the Districts of Columbus, Kentucky, in 1862–63, Rolla, Missouri, in 1863–64, and North Kansas in 1864–65. While in command at Columbus, Davies issued orders that the fortified Union post at Island No. 10 be disarmed with all ammunition destroyed, cannon spiked, and gun carriages burned, directives that seemed so nonsensical to the post commander that they had to be repeated several times before they were obeyed. One military investigator looking into the matter reported to headquarters that Davies' conduct should result in his dismissal from the army "the better for our country, its cause and its treasury." Davies, however, was not dismissed. On January 13, 1866, President Andrew Johnson nominated Davies for appointment to the grade of brevet major general of volunteers, to rank from July 11, 1865, and the United States Senate confirmed the appointment on March 12, 1866. Davies was mustered out of the Union Army on August 24, 1865.

== Postbellum ==
After the war, Davies returned to New York. He made a substantial fortune in real estate, and also devoted himself to philosophic and theological speculation. He published a number of books supporting the divine inspiration of the Bible, and rebutting materialistic philosophy. His books on theology were Cosmogony; or, Mysteries of Creation, Adam and Ha-Adam, Genesis Disclosed, and Answer to Hugh Miller and Theoretical Geologists. Davies was an Episcopalian, and was one of the oldest and influential members of St. Bartholomew's Episcopal Church, New York. He also published How to Make Money, and How to Keep It, which was later revised and reissued by Henry Ford.

Davies died in Ogdensburg, New York, in the fall of 1899, and was buried in the family cemetery in nearby Oswegatchie.

== See also ==
- List of American Civil War generals (Union)
