= 16th New York Infantry Regiment =

- Active: May 15, 1861, to May 22, 1863
- Country: United States
- Allegiance: Union
- Branch: Union Army
- Type: Infantry
- Engagements: Peninsula Campaign; Battle of Gaines Mill; Battle of Crampton's Gap; Battle of Chancellorsville

The 16th New York Infantry Regiment (or 1st Northern New York Regiment) was an volunteer infantry regiment in the Union Army during the American Civil War. This regiment fought in critical battles like the First Battle of Bull Run, Gaines Mill, and Chancellorsville. While this regiment was only active for two years, from 1861 to 1863, it became known for its notable headwear, which included straw hats, making it more easily identified.

== Recruitment ==
The 16th New York Infantry was organized by company in small towns and the regiment was assembled in Albany, New York, originally under the name "1st Northern New York Infantry. The regiment mustered in for two years of service as the 16th New York Infantry on May 15, 1861, under the command of Colonel Thomas A. Davies. This regiment recruited about 1,247 men, most of whom came from northern New York state. Among the enlisted men, the youngest member was 18 years old and the oldest was 45 years old.

Companies were principally recruited as follows: A at Ogdensburg, B and F at Potsdam, C and E at Plattsburg, D at Gouverneur, G at DePeyster, H at Stockholm, I at Malone, and K at West Chazy and Mooers.

The regiment was attached to the 2nd Brigade, 5th Division, Army of Northeastern Virginia from June 1861 to August 1861; Heintzelman's Brigade, Division of the Potomac to March 1862; Slocum's Brigade, Franklin's Division, I Corps to May 1862; 2nd Brigade, 1st Division, VI Corps to May 1863.

The regiment was originally armed with model 1840 muskets. In July 1861 the state of New York replaced these with Pattern 1853 Enfield rifle muskets. By the time of the Battle of Chancellorsville, Ordinance Dept. records show that the companies of the 16th were armed with a mixture of 1855 Springfield, 1861 Springfield and 1853 Enfield rifled muskets.

== Service ==
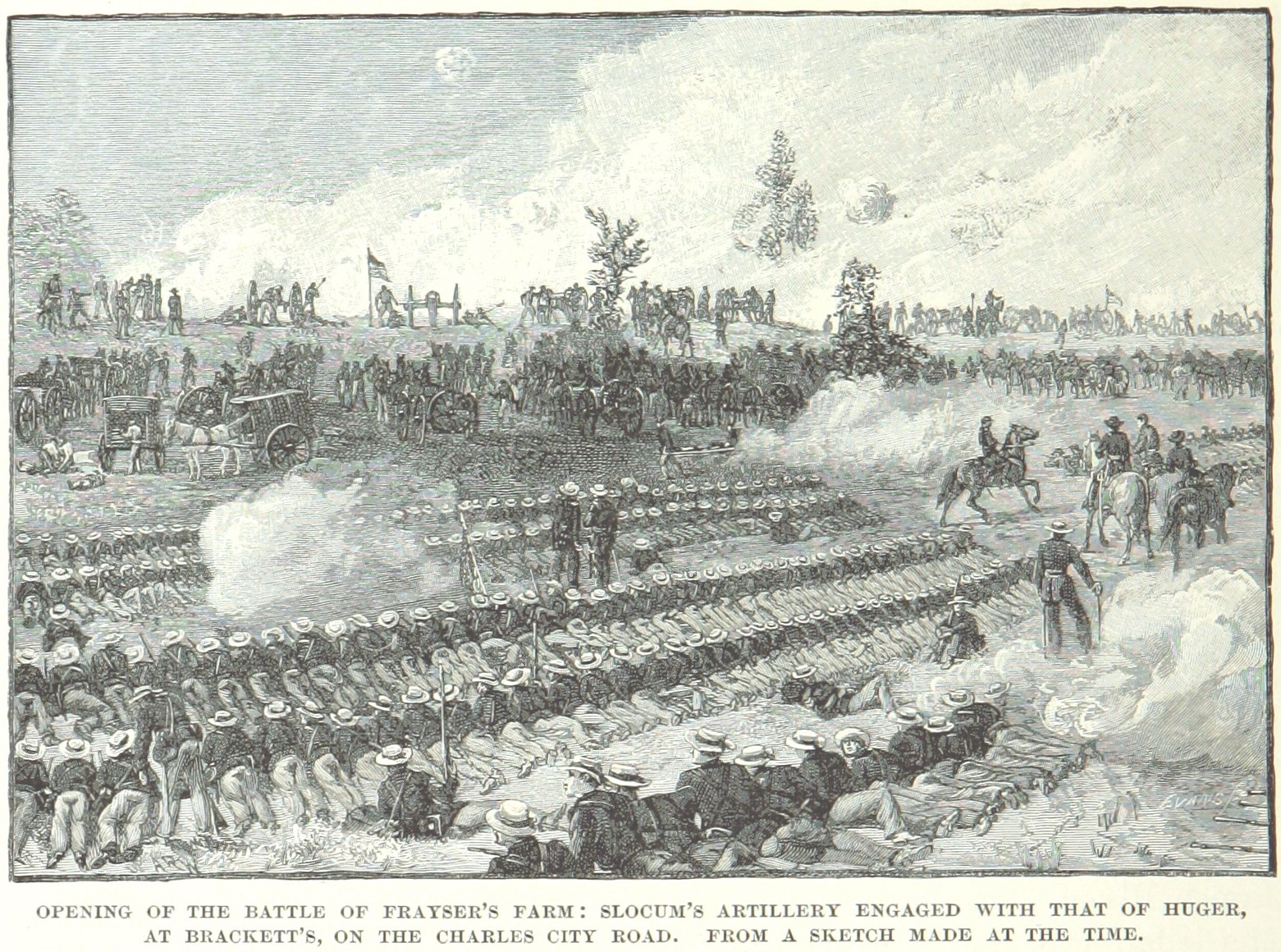
The 16th New York at the Battle of Frayser's Farm

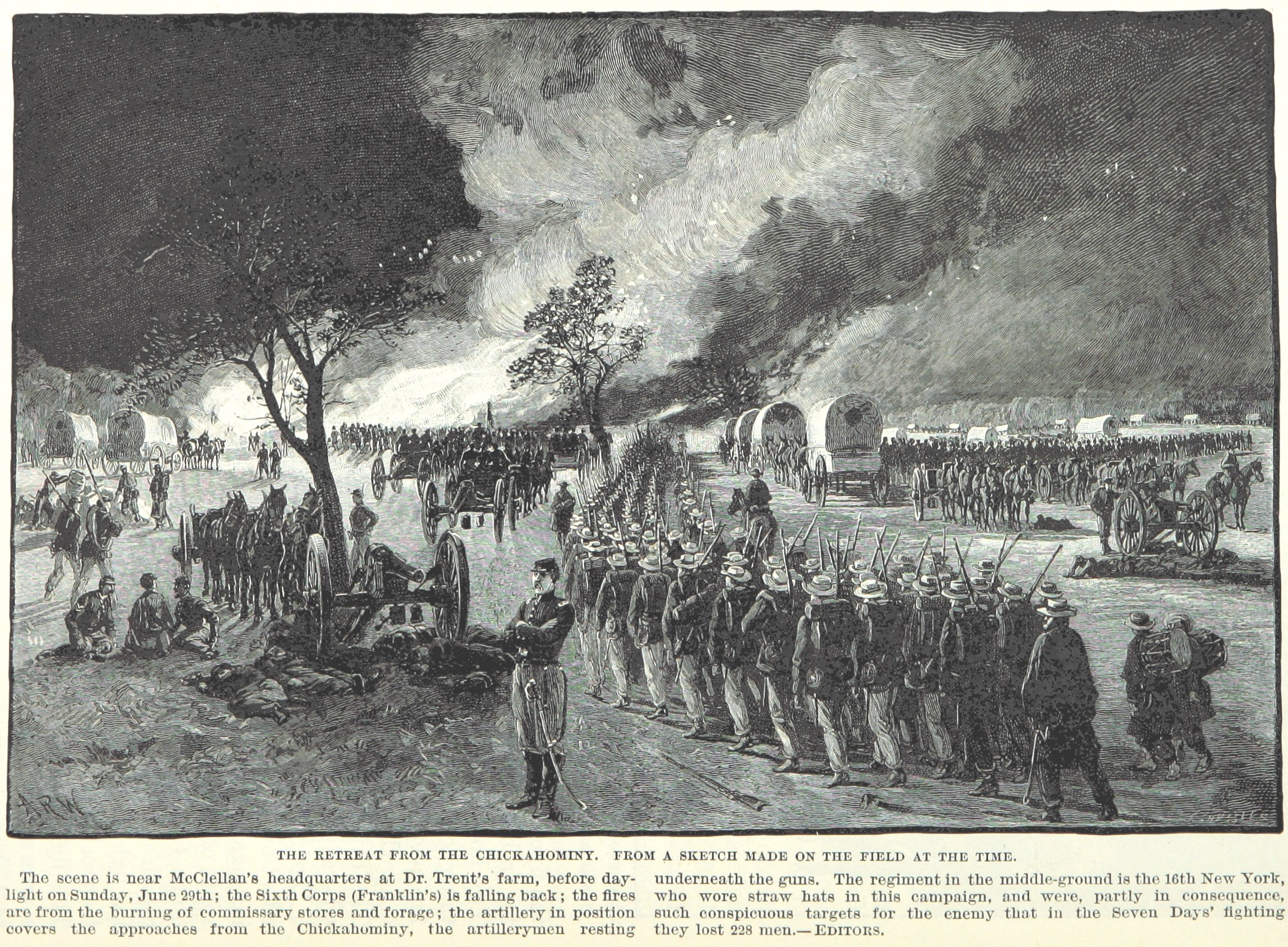
The 16th New York retreats with the Union Army after the Battle of Gaines's Mill

Mustered in at Albany, May 15, 1861, the regiment went into camp near Bethlehem and left the state for Washington on June 26. To Alexandria on July 11, from there to Manassas, where it was engaged but a very short time on the 21st and returned immediately after to Alexandria. On September 15, 1861, to Fort Lyon. The winter of 1861-62 was passed at Camp Franklin. Ordered to Catlett's Station April 6, 1862, but at once returned to camp; then ordered to Yorktown, where it arrived on May 3. In 1862 Major Joel J. Seaver of the regiment presented the members of the regiment with straw hats.

By the 18th of May, 1861 the companies of the 16th began squad and company drills at the Industrial School Barracks in Albany, NY. They practiced drills and the manual of arms for six hours a day except on Sundays. As a volunteer regiment, the officers were as inexperienced as the enlisted men, using their copies of Hardees Tactics for guidance and training the men.

On June 15, while in camp at Normand's Kill in Bethlehem, New York, the regiment was issued 150 Model 1840 Springfield muskets, and the men received their uniforms, notably first pattern New York State Jackets made by Brooks Brothers who were contracted by the New York State government to manufacture uniforms for volunteers. The morale of the regiment greatly improved upon receiving the new uniforms.

The regiment was in action at West Point, and at Gaines Mill, its loss being over 200 killed and wounded. Their straw hats stood out on the battlefield, making them targets for Confederate guns. The regiment was present through the remainder of that week of battle, but was not closely engaged, then encamped at Harrison's Landing until August 16, 1862, when it returned for a brief period to Alexandria. In the Battle of Crampton's Gap the regiment was in the battle field and lost heavily and was held in reserve at Antietam; at Fredericksburg was posted on picket duty, and after the battle went into winter quarters near Falmouth. It shared the hardships and discomforts of the Mud March under Burnside and was active in the Battle of Chancellorsville, with a loss at Salem Church of 20 killed, 87 wounded and 49 missing. A few days were next spent at Banks' Ford, then a short time in the old camp at Falmouth, and on May 22, 1863, the regiment was mustered out at Albany. During its term of service, its loss was 112 men killed or mortally wounded and 84 deaths from other causes. The three years men were transferred to the 121st New York Volunteer Infantry Regiment.

== Casualties ==
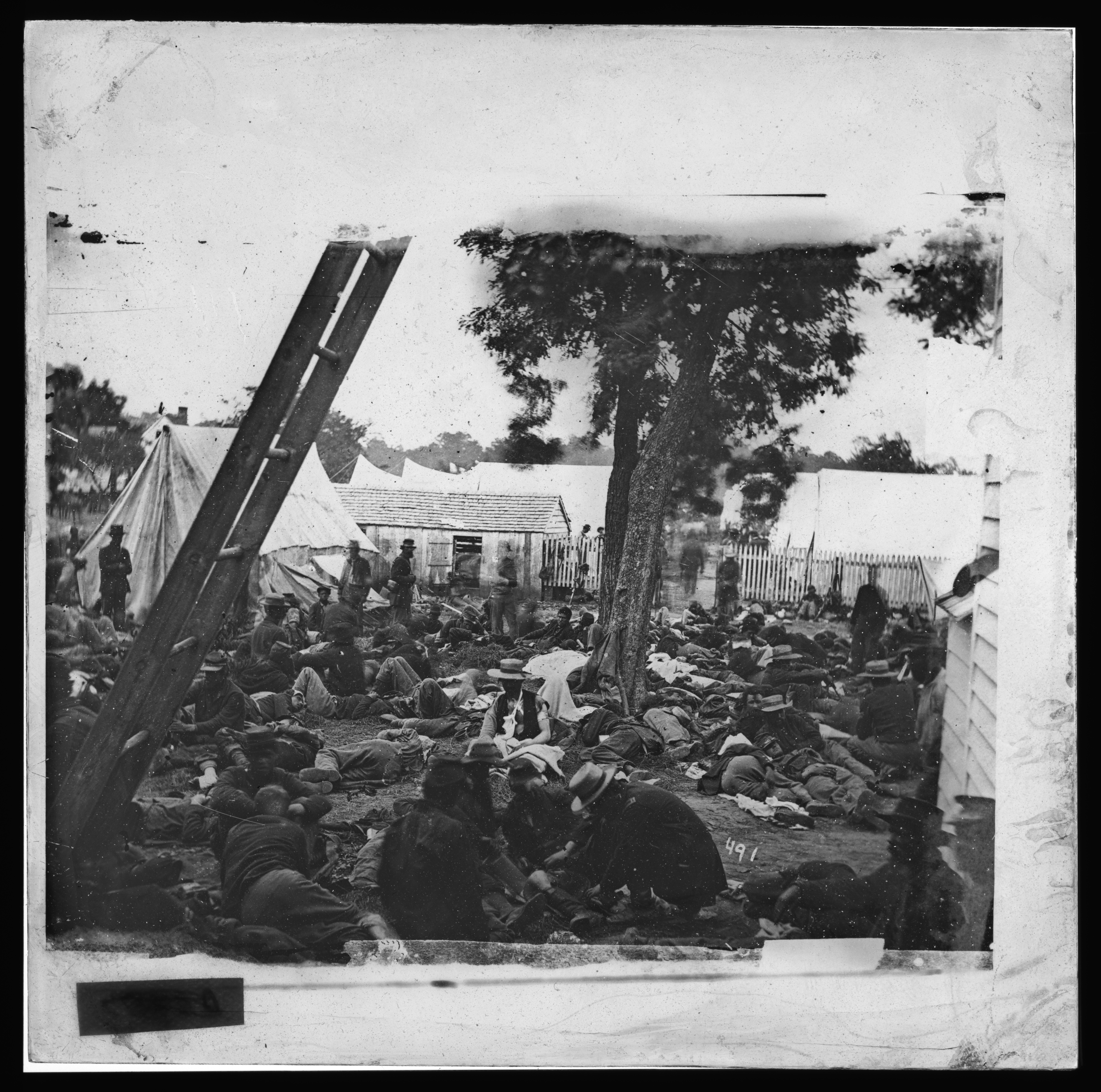
Savage Station, Va. Field hospital after the battle. June 30, 1862 (Gibson, James F., photographer: note the straw hats worn by the wounded.)

The regiment lost a total of 213 men during service, including five officers and 124 enlisted men either killed or mortally wounded and one officer and 83 enlisted men who died of diseases. Of the 38 New York regiments, except the Fifth, the 16th New York Infantry Regiment lost the most men among all the other regiments who served for the same length and time. Furthermore, a total of 111 men died due to serious wounds, with 107 of them being enlisted men and 4 of them were officers. An estimated 86 men died from imprisonment, disease, and accidents with 1 officer and 85 enlisted men dying.

== Commanders ==
- Colonel Thomas A. Davies
- Colonel Joseph Howland
- Colonel Joel J. Seaver
- Lieutenant Colonel Samuel Marsh
- Lieutenant Colonel Frank Palmer
- Major Buel Palmer
- Major John C. Gilmore

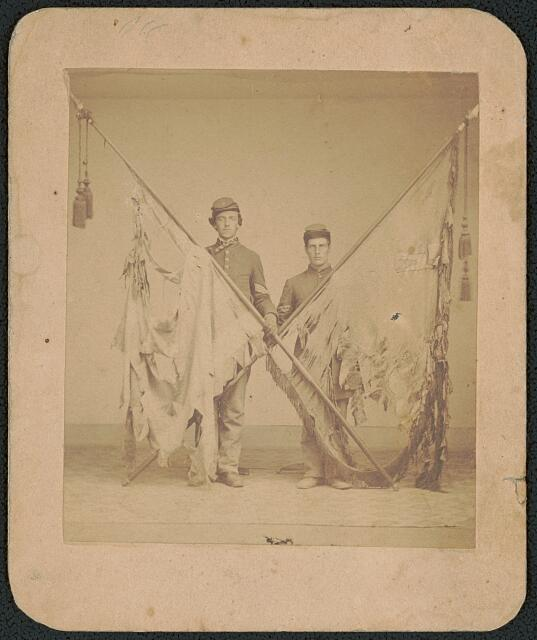
Corporal John S. Lyon of Co. A, 16th New York Infantry Regiment, and Corporal Melvin Tucker of Co. C, 16th New York Infantry Regiment, in uniforms holding torn flags, photographed by J.H. Abbott between 1861 and 1863

== Women's contributions ==
While the regiment consisted of men, numerous women assisted those on the battlefield by providing for and tending to the fighting men. In his 1906 monograph, From Bull Run to Chancellorsville, Newton Martin Curtis, a Union officer, notes that females contributed significantly to the medical care of the regiment in this regard. Mrs. Charles W. Woolsey Howland is among of these notable women who managed to provide hospitals "...with clothing and delicacies at the beginning of the war." Additionally, there were the efforts of Mrs. Howland and her sister (who goes unnamed by Curtis). Mrs. Howland was noted to have even saved a gentleman's arm from being amputated. Thanks to Mrs. Howland, "...Wells kept his arms and carried them to his grave, thirty seven years later." Last mentioned by Curtis is Miss Helen Gilson, who was noted to have kept an organized space for the injured on a "steamer" (boat or ship) despite the cramped conditions. Curtis fondly remembered Miss Gilson as a woman whose presence alone had quite the calming effect on the men in these less-than-ideal conditions.

Curtis also mentions the discrimination faced by women and nurses by surgeons, which was a male-dominated profession at the time. Despite these unpleasantries faced by the women, Curtis claims that they endured this discrimination for the sole purpose of helping the sick and dying of the regiments. This earned them the vast praises of Curtis, writing, "Their persistence was crowned with full acknowledgement of the importance of the essential need of women nurses in hospitals."

== See also ==
- List of New York Civil War regiments
- New York in the Civil War
