= Martha Gilmore =

American planetary geologist

- Born: 1972 (age 53–54) (Note: In 2002, Gilmore was reported to be 28)

Academic background
- Education: BA, Geology, 1991, Franklin & Marshall College; MS, PhD, Geological Sciences, 1997, Brown University
- Thesis: Tessera terrain on Venus: style, sequence and duration of deformation (1998)
- Doctoral advisor: James W. Head

Academic work
- Institutions: Jet Propulsion Laboratory; Washington and Lee University; Wesleyan University
- Website: mgilmore.faculty.wesleyan.edu

Martha Scott Gilmore (born c. 1972) is an American planetary geologist. She is the George I. Seney Professor of Geology and Director of Graduate Studies at Wesleyan University.

== Early life and education ==
Gilmore passed a high school equivalency exam at the age of 14 and applied to Franklin & Marshall College's geology and astronomy program. After graduating college, she earned her PhD from Brown University in 1998 and worked at NASA's Jet Propulsion Laboratory as a postdoctoral researcher.

== Career ==
Gilmore taught at Washington and Lee University for a year before joining the faculty at Wesleyan University in July 2000. That year, Gilmore and her research team published "Strategies for autonomous rovers at Mars" as they began developing a software that would allow the Mars rover to identify minerals and take samples.

As an associate professor of earth and environmental sciences, Gilmore received a grant from NASA to fund her study “Mapping and Structure Analysis of Fold Belts in Tessera Terrain, Venus” with Phil Resor. While sitting on NASA's Inner Planets Panel Membership team, she published "Remote sensing and in situ measurements for delineation and assessment of coastal marshes and their constituent species."

In May 2014, Gilmore was promoted to full professor of earth and environmental sciences. The following year, she collaborated with Patrick Harner to publish "Visible–near infrared spectra of hydrous carbonates, with implications for the detection of carbonates in hyperspectral data of Mars." Their article suggested that hydrous carbonate minerals might be relevant on Mars. Later that year, Gilmore was selected to join NASA's investigation teams; Deep Atmosphere Venus Investigation of Noble gases, Chemistry, and Imaging (DAVINCI) mission and The Venus Emissivity, Radio Science, InSAR, Topography and Spectroscopy mission (VERITAS) mission. Her research team received $3 million to conduct an in-depth concept design studies. Both mission concepts were resubmitted for Discovery funding in 2019 and in February 2020 were among the four missions selected as finalists, each receiving $3 million for further development.

By October 2019, Gilmore received funding by NASA to conduct her research on the habitability of Venus. In the following months, she would conduct run studies at NASA's Goddard Space Flight Center to explain how the mission would address the scientific priorities of the Decadal Survey and NASA.
