= Vince Gilmer =

American physician and pardoned convict

- Born: Vincent Donald Gilmer about 1962 (age 63–64); Fort Knox, Kentucky
- Occupation: Physician
- Children: None
- Parent(s): Dalton Donald Gilmer Jr & Gloria Jeanne Webster
- Relatives: Gloria “Diann” Gilmer (sister)
- Status: Conditional Pardon
- Conviction: First degree murder
- Penalty: Life imprisonment

Vincent Donald "Vince" Gilmer is an American physician who was convicted of the 2004 murder of his father. In 2022, he was conditionally pardoned by Virginia Governor Ralph Northam, but was not released until May 2024.

== Early life and career ==
Vince was born to Dalton Donald "Don" Gilmer and Gloria Jeanne (Webster) Hitt. Vince’s father was a Vietnam War veteran, who came back from the war a changed and sporadically violent man. He had a history of mental problems and of violent outbursts toward his wife and their children. Vince’s mother suffered abuse at the hands of Vince's father. Vince and his sister were sexually abused by their father from the time they were six and three years old, respectively. Vince's sister corroborated the abuse, but she disappeared before the trial in 2005. Her family has not seen or heard from her since, her whereabouts remain unknown and a mystery to many. Vince’s mother was unaware of the sexual abuse her children suffered.

Vince married a classmate from medical school and founded the Cane Creek Family Health Center in Fletcher, North Carolina. He was beloved by his patients, who nicknamed him Bear because he always hugged everyone.

== Crime ==
In June 2004, Gilmer checked his 60-year-old father, who had been diagnosed with schizophrenia and dementia, out of Broughton Hospital. Gilmer was supposed to transport his father from the state mental facility to private nursing care. Gilmer announced that he was going to take his father canoeing before checking him into private nursing care. Gilmer then strangled his father and left his body on the side of the road in Virginia. Gilmer left bloody rags and other evidence in his truck. Two days later, Gilmer reported his father missing and claimed that on the canoeing trip his father had wandered off.

== Trial ==
At trial, Gilmer fired his lawyers and represented himself. Gilmer testified that his father had sexually abused him and sister when they were children and that his father had tried to sexually assault him on the night of the murder. He also argued that he was withdrawing from using an anti-depressant drug, which can cause violent behavior and suicidal thoughts.

== Mental health diagnoses ==
In 2012, Sarah Koenig approached Benjamin Gilmer, the physician who had replaced Vince Gilmer at Cane Creek Family Health Center, about producing a podcast episode for This American Life covering Vince Gilmer's story. Benjamin Gilmer was not related to Vince and had tried to distance himself from the case, so he initially turned Koenig down. Benjamin Gilmer later agreed to the episode, and he and Koenig began investigating the murder. They discovered that in the months leading up to the murder, Vince's behavior had become erratic. He had injured his head in a car accident, suddenly divorced his wife, began drinking heavily, and stopped taking his anti-depressant medication. Benjamin Gilmer wrote to Vince, who was incarcerated, and received a letter back written in a "madman's scrawl" and asking for help.

Benjamin Gilmer and Koenig visited Vince Gilmer at Wallens Ridge State Prison, who told them that he had heard voices on the day of his father's murder and that his brain was failing. Following the visit, Benjamin Gilmer began reading the transcripts and court documents from Vince Gilmer's trial. After reading the documents, Benjamin Gilmer became convinced that Vince Gilmer was suffering from a mental illness or health condition. Benjamin Gilmer asked a psychiatrist to visit Vince in prison, who, after visiting, began to suspect that Vince Gilmer had Huntington's disease. Eventually, Vince Gilmer was tested and diagnosed with Huntington's, which is genetic and explained his father's previous diagnoses of schizophrenia and dementia. The combination of irritable aggression and psychosis caused by Huntington's, violent behavior and suicidal thoughts from Antidepressant discontinuation syndrome, and a history of sexual abuse could explain Gilmer's behavior on the night of the murder.

== Pardon ==
Benjamin Gilmer and other advocates lobbied Governor Terry McAuliffe to grant Gilmer clemency so he could be sent to a mental health facility, but McAuliffe failed to grant the petition.

Advocates then lobbied Governor Ralph Northam, hoping that his background as a pediatric neurologist would make him sympathetic to Gilmer's case. In 2021, Northam rejected Gilmer's petition. In January 2022, on his last day in office, Governor Northam granted Gilmer a conditional pardon. The pardon requires Gilmer to gain admission to a treatment facility that meets "both his psychiatric and medical needs," have the plan approved by the state Department of Corrections, and pay for secure transportation to be relocated. In July 2022, Benjamin Gilmer started a GoFundMe campaign to raise the money necessary to have Vince Gilmer transferred to an appropriate facility, which reached its $100,000 goal in November 2022.

== In popular culture ==
Gilmer's story was featured on a 2013 episode of This American Life. In March 2022, Benjamin Gilmer released a book titled The Other Dr. Gilmer. The book is being turned into a documentary.
