= Glen Gilmore =

Australian polo player

Glen Gilmore is a 7-goal Australian professional polo player. Gilmore has held the captaincy of the Australian polo team for the last 10 years and has represented his country at the Cartier International Day, gaining wins in 2003 and 2005.

Gilmore plays the whole of the UK season but has also competed in France, Spain, USA, Chile, Argentina, South Africa, New Zealand and Dubai.

Gilmore is also a Representative of professional playing members at the Guards Polo Club in the UK.
