= Gillette syndrome =

Disruption due to rapid population growth

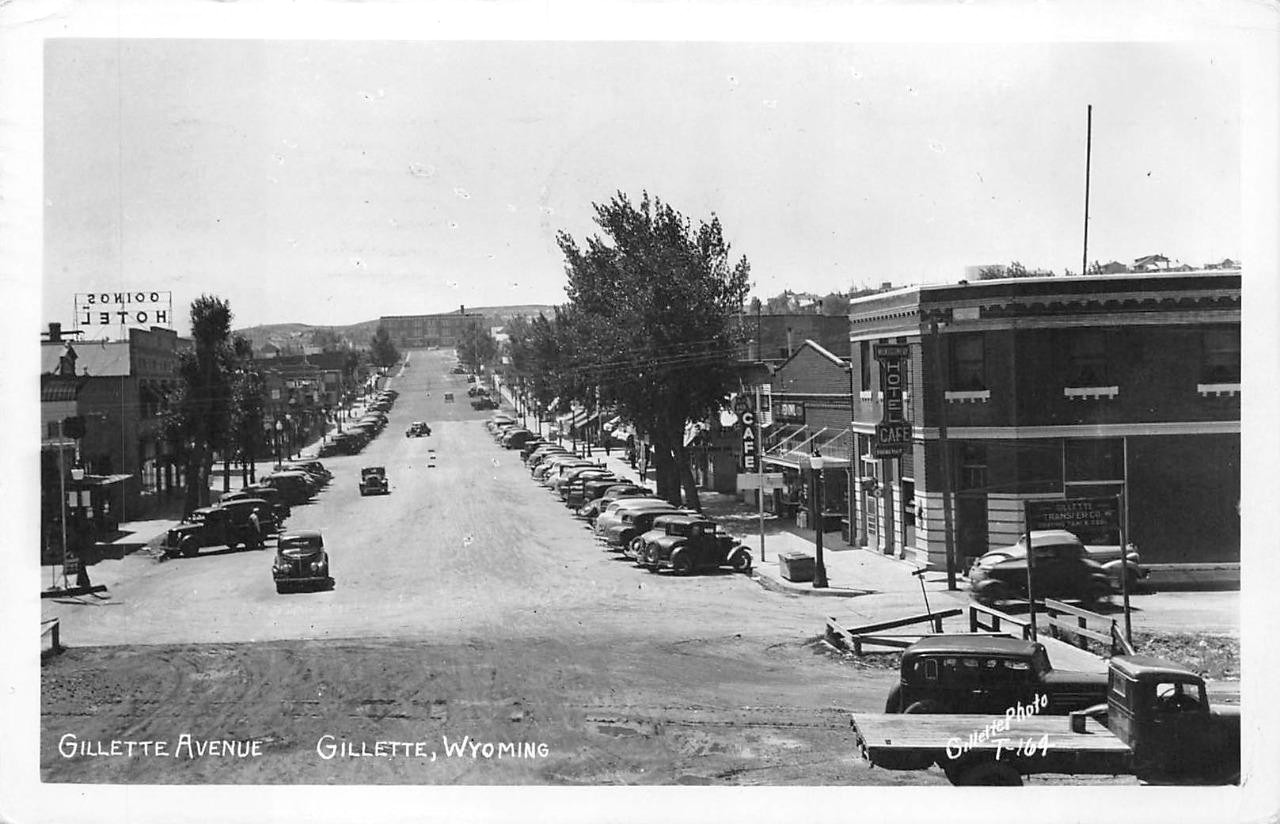
Postcard of Gillette Avenue looking south in Gillette, Wyoming.

Gillette syndrome is the social disruption that can occur in a community due to rapid population growth. Such disruptions usually include increased crime, degraded mental health, weakened social and community bonds, abnormally high costs of living, and other social problems.

Gillette syndrome is most relevant to boomtowns that are growing rapidly due to nearby natural resource extraction, such as coal mining or natural gas drilling.

Psychologist ElDean Kohrs coined the term "Gillette syndrome" in an attempt to describe the social impacts of rapid coal mining development on the American boomtown of Gillette, Wyoming.

== History ==
The first use of the term is thought to be in a 1973 article titled "Social Consequences of Technological Change and Energy Development" by ElDean Kohrs in the magazine The Wyoming Human Resources Confederation Insight. It was popularized by the media in Kohrs' 1974 conference paper "Social Consequences of Boom Growth in Wyoming" at the annual meeting of the Rocky Mountain American Association for the Advancement of Science.
