= Lake Gilmer =

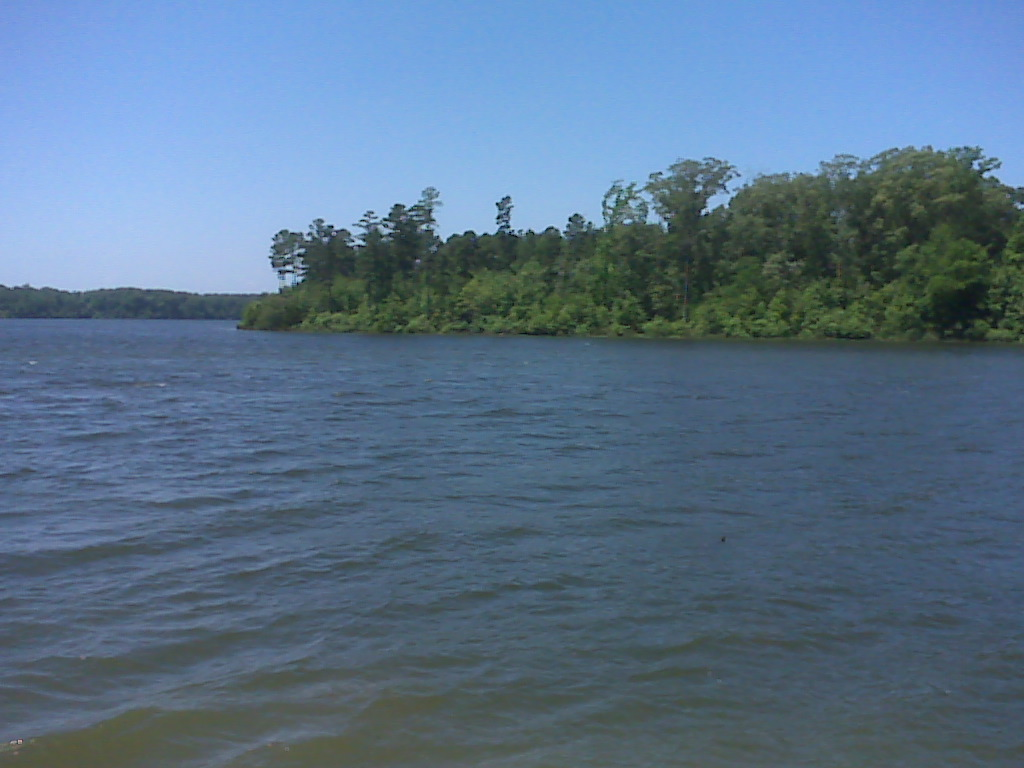

- Location within Texas Location within the United States
- Location: Upshur County, Texas, US
- Coordinates: 32.7593°N 94.9955°W
- Type: Reservoir
- Basin countries: United States
- Surface area: 1,010 acres (410 ha)
- Water volume: 12,720 acre⋅ft (15.69 hm^{3})

Lake Gilmer is four miles (6 km) west of downtown Gilmer, Texas, in the United States. It is located at State Highway 852 (SH 852).

The lake opened on September 29, 2001. It is 1,010 acres (4.1 km^{2}) in size and has another 1557 acres (6.3 km^{2}) of land that is planned to be developed into hiking and nature trails.
