= Gilmer, Illinois =

Unincorporated community in Illinois, United States

- Unincorporated community
- Location within Illinois Location within the United States
- Coordinates: 42°14′06″N 88°02′46″W
- Country: United States
- State: Illinois
- County: Lake
- Township: Ela
- Elevation: 810 ft (250 m)
- Time zone: UTC-6 (Central (CST))
  - Summer (DST): UTC-5 (CDT)
- Area codes: 847 & 224
- GNIS feature ID: 409027

Gilmer is an unincorporated community in Lake County, Illinois, United States. Gilmer is located along Gilmer Road and the Canadian National Railway north of Hawthorn Woods.
