= John Gilmour (cartoonist) =

New Zealand cartoonist

1936 cartoon by John Gilmore critiquing New Zealand’s reliance on Britain

John Henry Gilmour (1892 - 1951, also known as Jack Gilmour, Jno Gee, J.H. Gee and Jay Gee) was a New Zealand cartoonist. He was born in Christchurch and drew for the Canterbury Times (succeeding David Low), the Christchurch Star, the New Zealand Free Lance and the New Zealand Truth. He lived in England for several years from 1932, where he drew for the Evening Standard. During this time he also worked as a cartoonist for the British Union of Fascists and his work appeared in the movement's newspapers Fascist Week and The Blackshirt until 1935. He returned to New Zealand in the late 1930s, again working for Truth and the Star.

Ian F Grant has referred to Gilmour as a 'political chameleon': Gilmour 'drew cartoons for the Free Lance depicting the Labour Party as Bolsheviks. He went on to become the cartoonist for the Labour Party weekly the New Zealand Worker.'
