= The Association for Environmental Studies and Sciences =

Independent association

The Association for Environmental Studies and Sciences (AESS) is an independently run research association for higher education in the environmental studies and science field, aimed at expanding interdisciplinary studies in multiple fields, which includes environmental science, policy, management, ethics, and history. The AESS was formed in 2008, and states that the goal of the AESS is to allow researchers in diverse fields of study to research the relationships between human society and the environment. The current president of the AESS is Katherine Owens.

The AESS is also the host publisher of the Journal of Environmental Studies and Sciences (JESS). According to AESS, the Journal of Environmental Studies and Sciences aims to assist in the development of new environmental information that can potentially be applied in various parts of society by providing a base for scientists and scholars to use, whose fields of study span across multiple disciplinarians.
