= Richie Gilmore =

Richie Gilmore (c. 1966) is the Vice President in charge of Racing for Dale Earnhardt, Inc. (DEI).

== Background ==
Gilmore worked at Hendrick Motorsports for eight years. He was hired by DEI to be the team's head engine builder in 1998. He was promoted to his current position by DEI CEO/co-founder Teresa Earnhardt in January 2004 after Ty Norris resigned from the position.
