= Gilmar Tavinho =

Santomean footballer (born 1995)

Personal information
- Full name: Gilmar Lima Sacramento; Eusébio
- Date of birth: 3 March 1995 (age 31)
- Place of birth: São Tomé and Príncipe
- Position: Goalkeeper

Team information
- Current team: Trindade

Senior career*
Years	Team	Apps	(Gls)
2019–	Trindade		

International career^{‡}
2019–	São Tomé and Príncipe	1	(0)
- * Club domestic league appearances and goals as of 00:11, 26 March 2021 (UTC) ‡ National team caps and goals as of 00:11, 26 March 2021 (UTC)

Gilmar Lima Sacramento Eusébio (born 3 March 1995), known as Gilmar Tavinho, is a Santomean footballer who plays as a goalkeeper for Trindade and the São Tomé and Príncipe national team.

== International career ==
Trauré made his professional debut with the São Tomé and Príncipe national team in a 4–0 2021 Africa Cup of Nations qualification loss to Sudan on 13 November 2019.
