= Social disruption =

Sociology term

Social disruption is a term used in sociology to describe the alteration, dysfunction or breakdown of social life, often in a community setting. Social disruption implies a radical transformation, in which the old certainties of modern society fall away and something new emerges.

== Causes of social disruption ==
Social disruption might be caused through natural disasters, massive human displacements, rapid economic, technological, and demographic change but also due to controversial policy-making.

Social disruptions can be caused by rising sea levels that are creating new landscapes, drawing new world maps whose key lines are not traditional boundaries between nation-states.

On the local level, it could be the closing of a grocery store, or a newspaper causing a social disruption in a community by removing a "meeting ground" where members develop interpersonal relationships, find solidarity and share information.

In 2026, technologist Bill Gates spoke of the likelihood of large-scale social disruption that will happen over the next twenty years, resulting from the rapid deployment of Artificial Intelligence in the business world.

== Results of social disruption ==
Social disruptions often lead to five social symptoms: frustration, democratic disconnection, fragmentation, polarization and escalation. Studies from the last decade show, that our societies have become more fragmented and less coherent (e.g. Bishop 2008), neighbourhoods turning into little states, organizing themselves to defend the local politics and culture against outsiders (Walzer 1983; Bauman 2017) and increasingly identifying through ways of voting, lifestyle or wellbeing (e.g. Schäfer 2015). Especially people on the more right and left political spectrum are more likely to say it is important to them to live in a place where most people share their political views and have similar interests (Pew 2014). Hence, citizens become alienated from democratic consensus (Foa and Munk 2016; Levitsky and Ziblatt 2018) and tend to assume that their opponents believe more extreme things than they really do (Iyengar et al. 2012). Moreover, fear of being identified as unqualified, denied value and dignity and for that reason marginalized, excluded or outcast, is giving rise to a widespread disenchantment with the idea that the future will improve the human condition and a mistrust in the ability of nation-states to make this happen (Pew 2015; Bauman 2017). At the same time, accelerations in liberal progression, globalization and migration flows have led to increasing polarized contestations about national identities - a volatile and critical social state, prone to conflict escalation (e.g. hate crimes after Brexit vote, incident at far-right rally in Charlottesville, US).

== Policy making ==
International but also local challenges force our societies to find solutions and make decisions on controversial issues in an accelerated manner. The complexity of such decisions is not only mirrored in the aim to tackle a multi-causality of root causes, it also faces a high degree of uncertainty as regard to its impact. Hence, due to the growing separation between the world of public opinion on the one hand, and the world of problem solving on the other (Mair 2009), it is very likely that political decisions further polarize our societies. The explanation is that citizens evaluate disruptive developments and related policy changes on a two-way level, on the personal interests and comfort, as well on its perceived impact on their social identity and community (Ryan and Deci 2000; Haidt 2012). If a policy change reflects the substantive representation of the median voter, is something that just does not matter to citizens in regard to their acceptance of decisions (Esaiasson et al. 2017). This can produce multi facet conflicts over interests, facts and norms between supporters and opponents (Itten 2017). Simultaneously, the capacity of political parties and actors of civil society, to bridge that divide, is declining (Mair 2009). In such a situations, social psychology tells us that citizens who feel uncomfortable will hold tighter to the assumptions that make them feel secure (Podziba 2014). Especially in public policy disputes, parties are hardly giving up their assumptions voluntarily, and citizens begin to masquerade their true individual conflict of interest (e.g. devaluation of property; insecurity) with more normative conflict of interest (e.g. protection of nature; protection of culture). Such distorted behaviour remarkably increases at times citizens or communities feel that a policy change is threatening their way of living.

== Bridging social capital ==
In the light of the increasing social divisions and democratic disconnection, Putnam and Feldstein (2004) foresaw the importance of creating "bridging social capital", e.g. ties that link groups across a greater social distance. As the authors elaborate, the creation of robust social capital takes time and effort. It develops largely through extensive and time-consuming face-to-face conversation between two individuals or small groups of people. Only then there is the chance to build the trust and mutual understanding that characterizes the foundation of social capital. In no way, Putnam and Feldstein write, it is possible to create social capital instantaneous, anonymous or en masse. Furthermore, building social capital among people who already share a reservoir of similar cultural referents, ethnicity, personal experience or moral identity etc. is qualitatively different. Homogeneity makes connective strategies easier, however, a society with only homogeneous social capital risks looking like Bosnia or Belfast. Hence, bridging social capital is especially important for reconciling democracy and diversity. Yet, bridging social capital among diverse social group is intrinsically less likely to develop automatically.

== See also ==
Sociology:

- Boomtown
- Gillette syndrome
- Social problem
- Social capital
- Social transformation
