= Voit Gilmore =

American politician

Voit Gilmore (October 13, 1918 – October 15, 2005) was an American Democratic politician and geographer from North Carolina. Gilmore served two terms in the North Carolina Senate in 1965.

Born in Winston-Salem, North Carolina, Gilmore received his bachelor's degree in journalism and political science from University of North Carolina at Chapel Hill and went to the Rockefeller Institute of Public Affairs in Washington, D.C. As a college student, he worked to get Franklin Roosevelt to speak on campus.

He was the first director of the United States Travel Service from 1961 to 1964 during the administrations of John F. Kennedy and Lyndon Johnson. Gilmore served in the United States Navy during World War II. He served as mayor of Southern Pines, North Carolina and on the Southern Pines Town Board from 1952 to 1957.

Gilmore owned a travel agency and was the president of the Travel Council of North Carolina. He received two advanced degrees in geography.

Gilmore and Kathryn McNeil donated a learning center near Purchase Knob to the Great Smoky Mountains National Park in 2000.
