= Environmental studies =

Academic study of human–environment interaction

Environmental studies (EVS or EVST) is a multidisciplinary academic field which systematically studies human interaction with the environment. Environmental studies connects principles from the physical sciences, commerce/economics, the humanities, and social sciences to address complex contemporary environmental issues. It is a broad field of study that encompasses the natural environment, the built environment, and their relationship. The field encompasses study in basic principles of ecology and environmental science, as well as associated subjects such as ethics, geography, anthropology, public policy (environmental policy), education, political science (environmental politics), urban planning, law, economics, philosophy, sociology and social justice, planning, pollution control, and natural resource management.

Environmental studies degree programs include bachelor's and master's degrees. These programs provide analytical tools to address environmental issues and examine the interactions between individuals, society, and the environment.

Environmental education's main goal is to instill in all members of society a pro-environmental thinking and attitude. This will help create environmental ethics and raise people's awareness of the importance of environmental protection and biodiversity.

== History ==
The New York State College of Forestry at Syracuse University established a BS in environmental studies degree in the 1950s, awarding its first degree in 1956. Middlebury College established the major there in 1965.

The Environmental Studies Association of Canada (ESAC) was established in 1993 "to further research and teaching activities in areas related to environmental studies in Canada". ESAC was officially integrated in 1994, and the first convention for ESAC was held at the Learned Societies Conference in Calgary the same year. ESAC's magazine, A\J: Alternatives Journal was first published by Robert A. Paehlke on 4 July 1971.

In 2008, The Association for Environmental Studies and Sciences (AESS) was founded as the first professional association in the interdisciplinary field of environmental studies in the United States. The AESS is also the publisher of the Journal of Environmental Studies and Sciences (JESS), which provides researchers across disciplines related to environmental sciences with a platform to publish new information on environmental studies. In 2010, the National Council for Science and the Environment (NCSE) agreed to advise and support the association. In March 2011, the association's scholarly journal, the Journal of Environmental Studies and Sciences (JESS), commenced publication.

=== Environmental studies in U.S. universities ===
In the United States, many high school students can take environmental science as a college-level course. Over 500 colleges and universities in the United States offer environmental studies as a degree. The University of California, Berkeley has awarded the most degrees in environmental studies for U.S. universities, with 409 degrees awarded in 2019.

The university in the United States that has the highest percentage of degrees awarded is Antioch University-New England, where nearly 35% of degrees awarded in 2019 were in environmental studies.

== Education ==
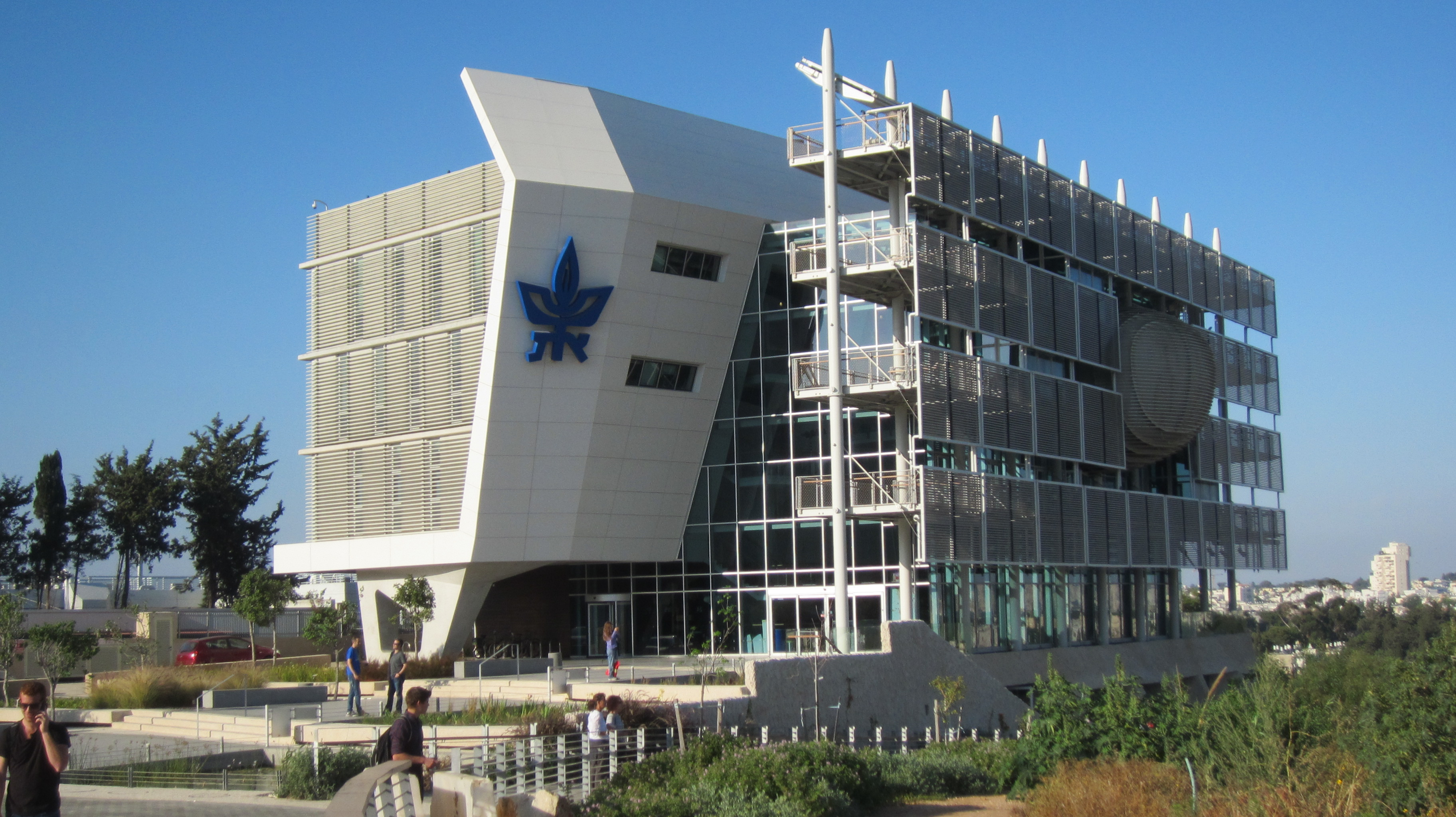
The Porter School of Environmental Studies Building – Tel Aviv University.

Worldwide, programs in environmental studies may be offered through colleges of liberal arts, life sciences, social sciences, or agriculture. Students of environmental studies use what they learn from the sciences, social sciences, and humanities to understand environmental problems better and potentially offer solutions. Students examine how we interact with the natural world and develop ideas to prevent its destruction.

In the 1960s, the word "environment" became one of the most commonly used in educational discourse in the United Kingdom. Educators were becoming increasingly worried about the influence of the environment on children and about schools' use of it. The attempt to define the field of environmental studies has sparked discussion about its role in the curriculum. The use of the environment is one of the teaching approaches used in today's schools to carry on the legacy of educational philosophy known as 'Progressive education' or 'New education' in the first part of the twentieth century.

The primary goal of environmental studies is to help children understand the processes that shape their surroundings so they do not remain passive, often befuddled observers of the environment, but rather become knowledgeable, active mediators of it. The study of the environment can be considered to offer unique chances for the development and exercise of the general cognitive skills that Piaget's work has made educators aware of. Environmental studies are increasingly being viewed as a long-term preparation for higher environmental studies such as Sociology, Archaeology, or Historical Geography.

== See also ==
- Conservation Commons
- Environmental ethics – Part of environmental philosophy
- Environmental communication – Type of communication
- Environmental education – Branch of pedagogy
- Environmental racism – Environmental injustice that occurs within a racialized context
- Environmental social science – Interaction of humans with the environment
- Environmental sociology – Study of interactions between societies and their natural environments
- Environmental geography – Intersection of human and physical geography
- List of environmental degrees – Overview of and topical guide to environmental studies
- List of environmental journals
- Sustainable development – Mode of human development
