= John S. Gilmore =

American sociologist

John S. Gilmore is an American sociologist who has written extensively about western energy boomtowns in the 1970s and 1980s.

While employed by the University of Denver Research Institute Gilmore wrote a number of influential papers and books regarding boomtown growth management. The most influential of which is the 1975 book Boom Town Growth Management: A Case Study of Rock Springs – Green River, Wyoming (with Mary K. Duff) (Westview, Florida Press).

Also influential and heavily cited is an article that appeared in the journal Science on February 13, 1976, called "Boomtowns May Hinder Energy Resource Development". The article outlined a hypothetical western boomtown called "Pistol Shot USA", which summarized for the first time the social, political, and economic problems various energy boomtowns had been experiencing during the 1970s.

== See also ==
- Gillette syndrome
- Boomtown
- Company town
