= Jill Gilmore =

New Zealand footballer (born 1973)

Personal information
- Full name: Jill Gilmore
- Date of birth: 5 April 1973 (age 53)
- Place of birth: New Zealand

International career
| Years | Team | Apps | (Gls) |
| 1993–2000 | New Zealand | 17 | (0) |

Jill Gilmore (née Corner) (born 5 April 1973) is an association football player who represented New Zealand at international level.

Gilmore made her Football Ferns as a substitute in a 7–0 win over Trinidad & Tobago on 8 August 1993, and finished her international career with 17 caps to her credit.

She co-coaches Auckland in the New Zealand National Women's Soccer League.
