= John W. Gilmore =

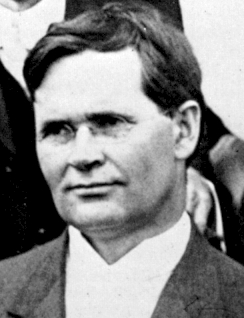
- John Washington Gilmore (photo circa 1908-1913, University of Hawai'i Library).
- Born: May 9, 1872; White County, Arkansas
- Died: June 25, 1942 (aged 70); Woodland, California
- Education: Cornell University
- Scientific career
- Fields: Agronomy

John Washington Gilmore (May 9, 1872 – June 25, 1942) was an American agronomist, educator and academic administrator who served as the first president of the University of Hawaii from 1908 to 1913.

== Biography ==
He was born May 9, 1872, in White County, Arkansas, to Thomas Griffin and Emily Landrum Gilmore. He received his elementary and secondary education in Fort Worth, Texas. He attended Cornell University, obtaining the B.S. degree in 1898 and the M.S.A. degree in 1906.

Upon his graduation from Cornell, he was the assistant director of the Provincial Agricultural College at Wuchang, China from 1898 to 1900, an instructor in charge of agriculture and nature study in the Honolulu Normal and Training School in 1901. He served as a fiber expert for the Philippine Bureau of Agriculture in 1902. From 1903 to 1907, he worked as an instructor and assistant professor of Agronomy at Cornell University, followed by as a professor of Agronomy in Pennsylvania State College from 1907 and 1908. From 1908 to 1913, he was the president of the University of Hawaii, now the University of Hawaii at Manoa. He went on to teach as a professor of Agronomy at the University of California Davis from 1913 until his death

The Gilmore Halls at University of Hawaii and at the University of California, Davis were both named in his honor. Gilmore's son Raymond M. Gilmore was a zoologist and expert on migration of California grey whales.

== Selected publications ==
- Gilmore, John W. Brief Observations on the Agricultural Conditions of Chile. n.p., 1921.
- Gilmore, John W. Cotton in the San Joaquin Valley. Circular / University of California, College of Agriculture, Agricultural Experiment Station; no. 192. Berkeley, Calif.: University of California, College of Agriculture, Agricultural Experiment Station, 1918.
- Gilmore, John W. Crop Sequences at Davis. Bulletin; no. 393. Berkeley, Cal.: Agricultural Experiment Station, 1925.
- Gilmore, John W. Potatoes in California. Circular / University of California, College of Agriculture, Agricultural Experiment Station; no. 161. Berkeley, Calif.: University of California, College of Agriculture, Agricultural Experiment Station, 1917.
- Gilmore, John W. Wheat Culture. Circular / University of California, College of Agriculture, Agricultural Experiment Station; no. 172. Berkeley, Calif.: University of California, College of Agriculture, Agricultural Experiment Station, 1917.
- Gilmore, John W., and C. F. Clark. Second Report on the Influence of Fertilizers on the Yield of Timothy Hay. Bulletin 241. Ithaca, N.Y.: Cornell University, 1906.
- Gilmore, John W., and L. J. Fletcher. Desirable Qualities of California Barley for Export. Circular / University of California, College of Agriculture, Agricultural Experiment Station; no. 246. Berkeley, Calif.: University of California, College of Agriculture, Agricultural Experiment Station, 1922.
