= John C. Gilmore =

John Curtis Gilmore
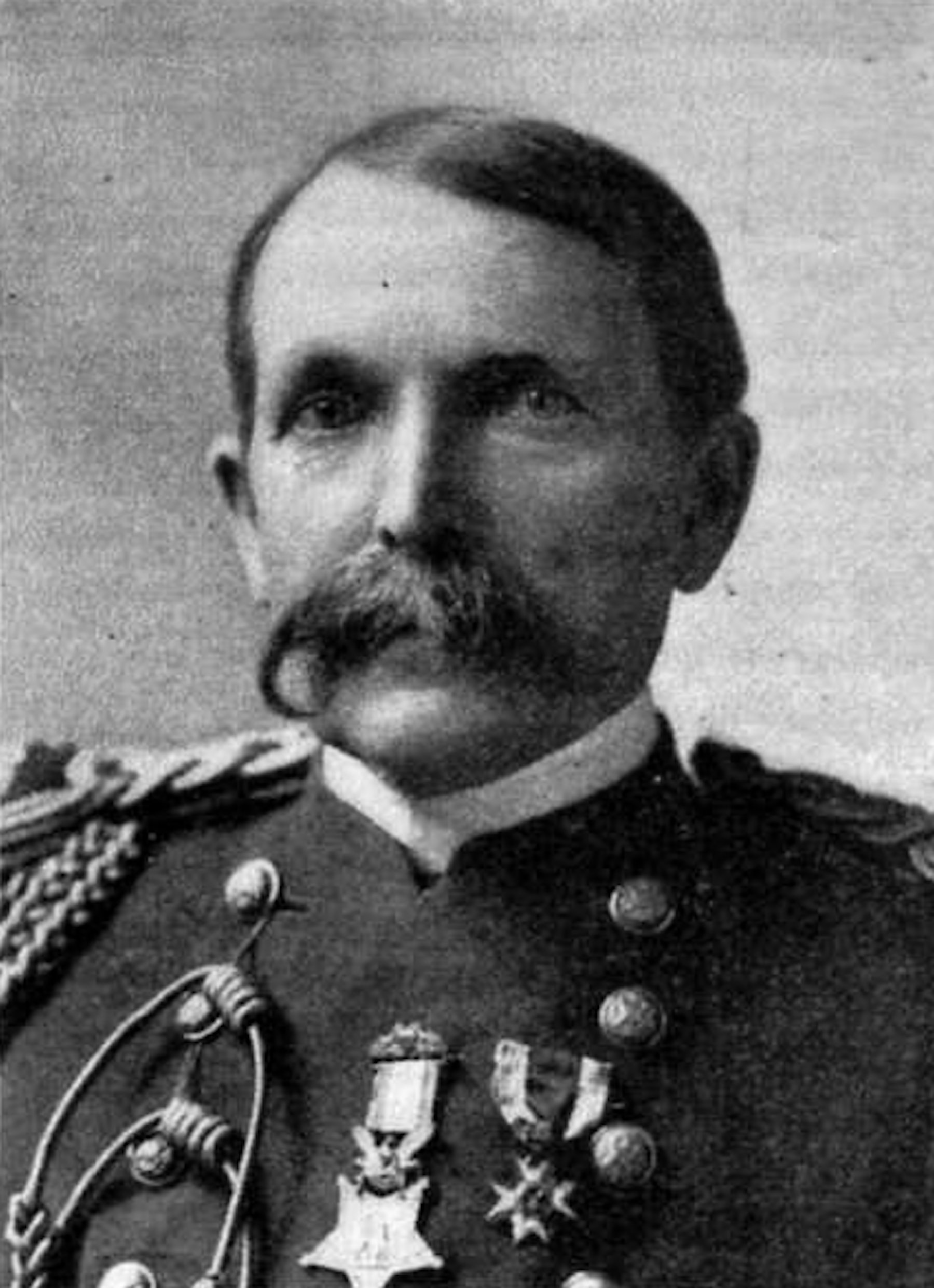
- Medal of Honor recipient John Curtis Gilmore
- Born: April 18, 1837; Canada
- Died: December 22, 1922 (aged 85)
- Burial place: Arlington National Cemetery, Virginia
- Military career
- Allegiance: United States of America
- Branch: United States Army
- Service years: 1861 - 1863, 1865 - 1901
- Rank: Brigadier general
- Unit: (New York (state)) 16th New York Volunteer Infantry Regiment
- Conflicts: Second Battle of Fredericksburg; American Civil War
- Awards: Medal of Honor

John Curtis Gilmore (April 18, 1837 – December 22, 1922) was an American soldier who fought in the American Civil War. He received the United States' highest award for bravery during combat, the Medal of Honor.

Gilmore's medal was won for capturing the flag and rallying the spirits of the troops under his command during the Second Battle of Fredericksburg on May 3, 1863. He was honored with the award on October 10, 1892.

== Biography ==
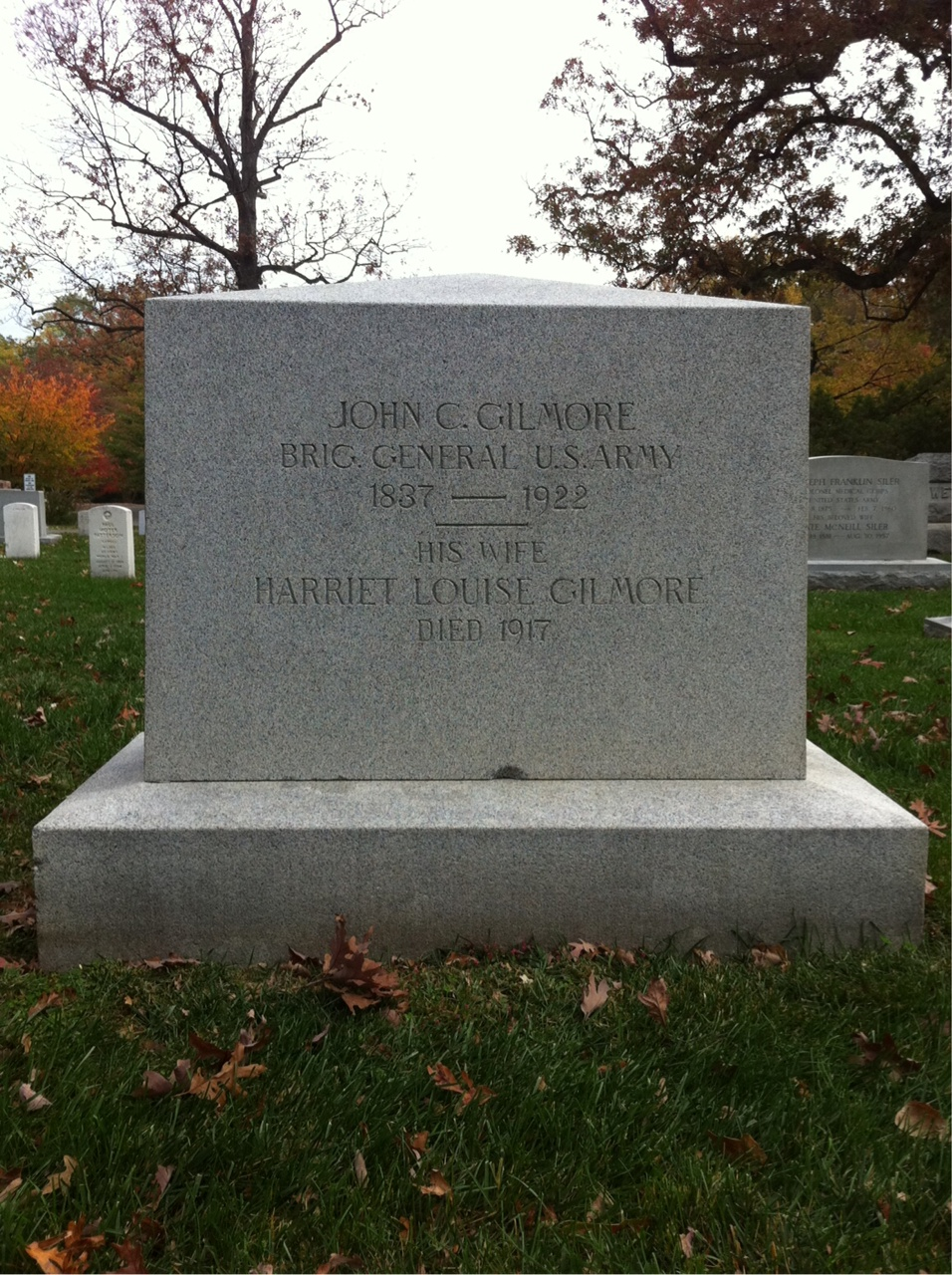
Grave at Arlington National Cemetery

Gilmore was born in Canada and was commissioned as a Captain in May 1861. He was promoted to major in September 1862 and mustered out in 1863. He rejoined the Army in 1865 and rose to the rank of brigadier general before retiring on his 64th birthday in 1901.

He was a companion of the District of Columbia Commandery of the Military Order of the Loyal Legion of the United States.

== Death and interment ==
Following his death on December 22, 1922, he was buried at Arlington National Cemetery.

== Medal of Honor citation ==
The President of the United States of America, in the name of Congress, takes pleasure in presenting the Medal of Honor to Major John Curtis Gilmore, United States Army, for extraordinary heroism on 3 May 1863, while serving with 16th New York Infantry, in action at Salem Heights, Fredericksburg, Virginia. Major Gilmore seized the colors of his regiment and gallantly rallied his men under a very severe fire.

== See also ==
- List of American Civil War Medal of Honor recipients: G–L
