= Ross-shire =

Coordinates: 57.8°N 5.0°W

- Historic county
- Sovereign state: United Kingdom
- Country: Scotland
- County town: Dingwall

Area
  - Total: 3,100 sq mi (8,000 km^{2})
- Ranked 3rd of 34
- Chapman code: ROC (as part of Ross and Cromarty)

Ross-shire (/ˈrɒs.ʃaɪər/; Scottish Gaelic: Siorrachd Rois), or the County of Ross, was a county in the Scottish Highlands. It bordered Sutherland to the north and Inverness-shire to the south, as well as having a complex border with Cromartyshire, a county consisting of numerous enclaves or exclaves scattered throughout Ross-shire's territory. The mainland had a coast to the east onto the Moray Firth and a coast to the west onto the Minch. Ross-shire was named after and covered most of the ancient province of Ross, and also included the Isle of Lewis in the Outer Hebrides. The county town was Dingwall.

Ross-shire was abolished in 1889, merging with Cromartyshire to form a new county called Ross and Cromarty. The area is now part of the Highland council area, except for the parts in the Outer Hebrides, which are in Na h-Eileanan an Iar. The name Ross-shire continued to be used by the Royal Mail as a postal county (including for the areas that were formerly in Cromartyshire) until postal counties were discontinued in 1996.

== History ==
The province of Ross is documented from the 10th century. Prior to that, the area was the northern part of the province of Moray. The boundary between Moray and Ross in the 10th century followed the River Beauly, which also marked the southern extent of Norwegian overlordship at the time. The Scottish crown claimed the overlordship of Ross and neighbouring Caithness (which then included Sutherland) from Norway in 1098, but the process of establishing effective Scottish authority over the area took many years. Whereas Moray to the south was divided into shires (areas administered by a sheriff) during the 12th century, Ross and Caithness at that time were placed under the nominal jurisdiction of the Sheriff of Inverness (one of the three sheriffdoms created covering the province of Moray) rather than being given their own sheriffs.

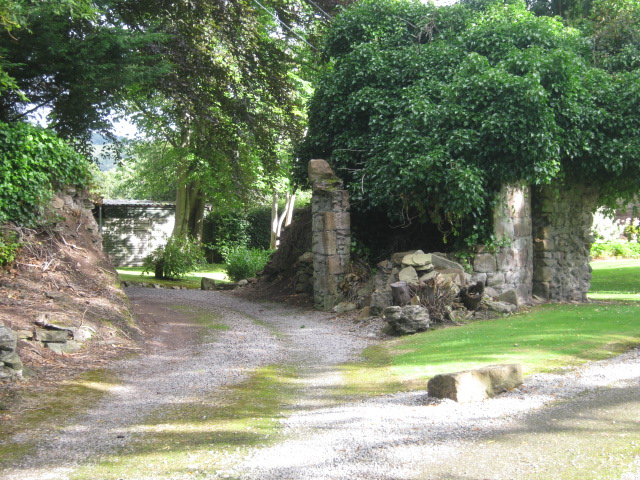
Ruins of Dingwall Castle, seat of the Earls of Ross

By the mid-13th century there were sheriffs at Cromarty and Dingwall, both within the province of Ross, but each appears to have had only a small area of jurisdiction around those towns, rather than the larger territories usually given to sheriffs. The Sheriff of Inverness was therefore still responsible for most of Ross and Caithness. The position of Sheriff of Dingwall did not endure.

Following the crown's defeat of the rebellion in 1475 by John MacDonald, Lord of the Isles and Earl of Ross, the Lordship of the Isles was fully absorbed into the kingdom of Scotland. The shire of Inverness was therefore enlarged to take in the Outer Hebrides and some of the Inner Hebrides (notably Skye). An act of parliament in 1504 acknowledged that the shire of Inverness was too big for the effective administration of justice, and so declared Ross and Caithness to be separate shires, with the sheriff of Ross to sit at either Dingwall or Tain.

That act was set aside for most purposes in 1509, and Ross once more came under the sheriff of Inverness. Another act in 1649 re-stated Ross's separation from Inverness-shire, but was only implemented for the purposes of appointing commissioners (as members of the Parliament of Scotland were called). A subsequent act in 1661 finally separated Ross from Inverness-shire for all other purposes. Kenneth Mackenzie, 3rd Earl of Seaforth, was subsequently appointed as the first permanent Sheriff of Ross in 1662 (following some resistance from Alexander Stuart, 5th Earl of Moray, who held the position of sheriff of Inverness and was reluctant to cede his authority over Ross).

Most of Scotland's shires had been created centuries earlier, when feudalism was at its height; many shires corresponded to the older comital provinces, or groupings or subdivisions of them. By the time Ross-shire was created in the mid-17th century, there were several powerful landowners in Ross, but the old title of Earl of Ross had become effectively extinct, having been merged into the crown. The vested interests of the landowners influenced the boundaries of the new shire. Whereas the old province of Ross had not included any of the Hebrides, Ross-shire was defined to also included the northern Outer Hebrides, notably the Isle of Lewis, which was owned by Kenneth Mackenzie, 3rd Earl of Seaforth, a major landowner in Ross. (The rest of the Outer Hebrides stayed in Inverness-shire.) Conversely, Ross-shire excluded the small area of Cromartyshire, which just covered the area around the town of Cromarty at that time. Ross-shire also excluded other areas north of the River Beauly owned by Clan Fraser of Lovat, which stayed in Inverness-shire where that family was based, and the Ferintosh estate on the Black Isle, which was owned by the Forbes family based in Nairnshire, and so was made an exclave of that county.

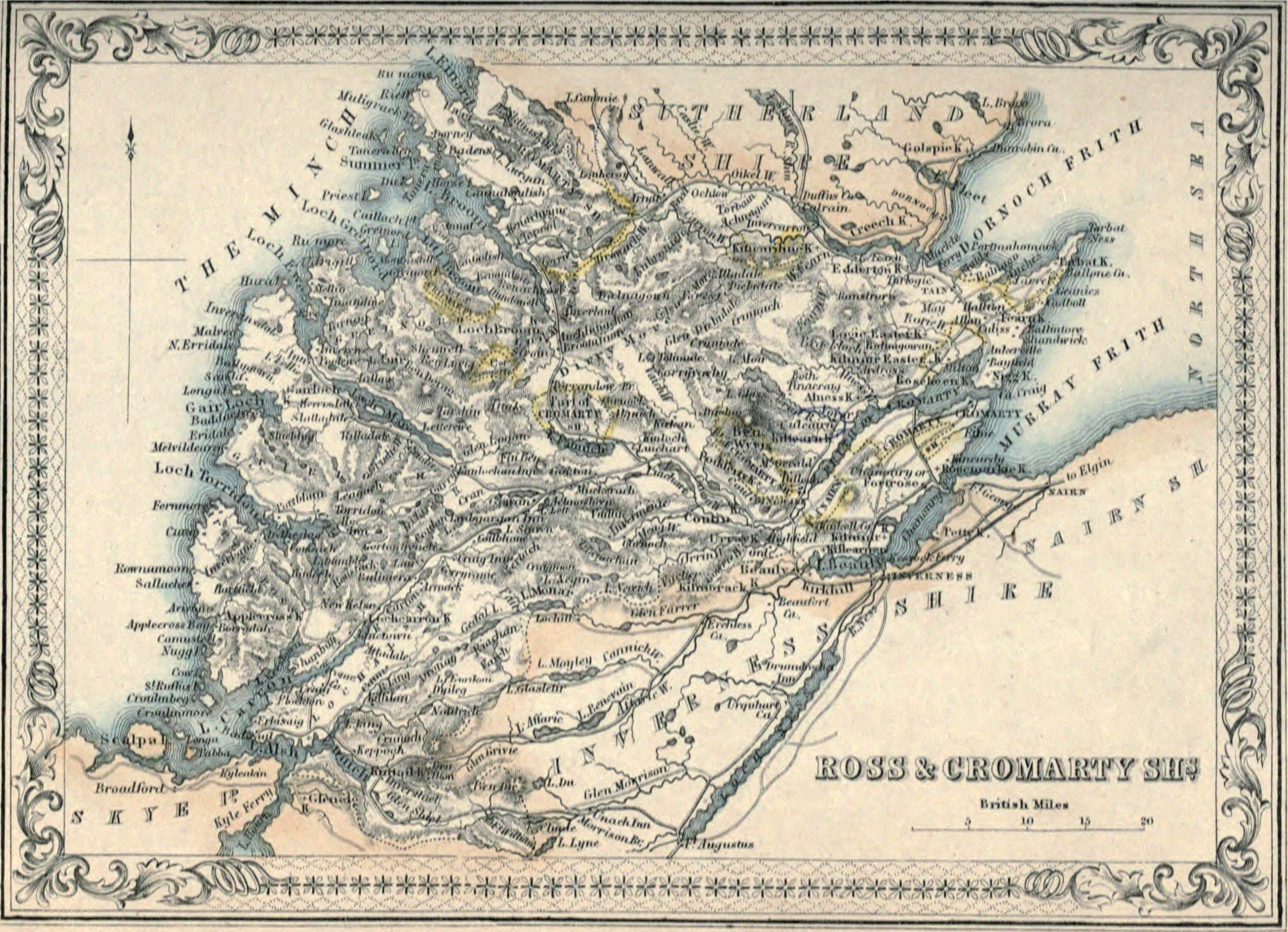
1861 map of Ross-shire and Cromartyshire

In the late 17th century, Cromartyshire was significantly enlarged to take over numerous separate tracts of land across Ross-shire. Despite many being some distance from Cromarty itself, they were owned by George Mackenzie, Viscount of Tarbat, who owned the barony of Cromarty and wanted all his lands to be in the same shire.

Over time, Scotland's shires became more significant than the old provinces, with more administrative functions being given to the sheriffs. In 1667 Commissioners of Supply were established for each shire, which would serve as the main administrative body for the area until the creation of county councils in 1890. Following the Acts of Union in 1707, the English term 'county' came to be used interchangeably with the older term 'shire'.

Following the Jacobite rising of 1745, the government passed the Heritable Jurisdictions (Scotland) Act 1746, returning the appointment of sheriffs to the crown in those cases where they had become hereditary positions, as had been the case for the Sheriff of Cromarty. The scope for a major landowner or clan chief to control the office of sheriff, which had been the major cause of Cromartyshire being separated from the rest of Ross, was therefore greatly reduced. From 1748 the government merged the positions of Sheriff of Ross and Sheriff of Cromarty into a single position.

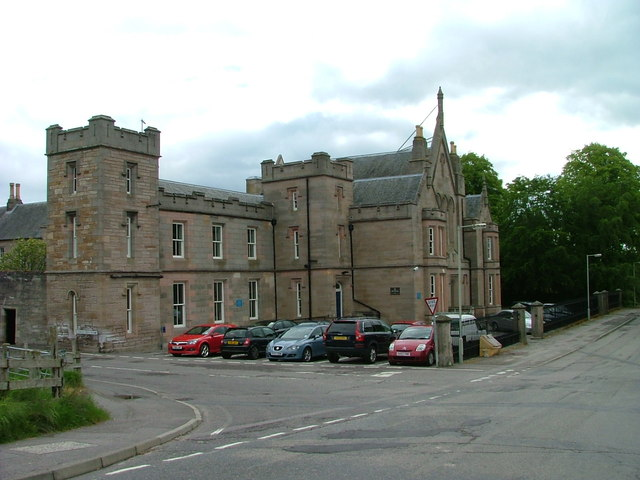
Dingwall Sheriff Court, built 1845: Ross-shire's main courthouse and meeting place of the county's Commissioners of Supply. Subsequently became meeting place for the Ross and Cromarty County Council created in 1890

Despite sharing a sheriff from 1748, Ross-shire and Cromartyshire remained legally separate counties. They retained separate commissioners of supply, and from 1794 each appointed their own lord-lieutenants. From 1860 the commissioners of supply for the two counties were directed to work together on delivering some functions, notably relating to prisons.

The Local Government (Scotland) Act 1889 provided that "the counties of Ross and Cromarty shall cease to be separate counties, and shall be united for all purposes whatsoever, under the name of the county of Ross and Cromarty." The new county of Ross and Cromarty came into being from the passing of the act in August 1889. The act also established elected county councils, which came into being in May 1890. Ross and Cromarty existed as a county until 1975. The Royal Mail used 'Ross-shire' as the name of the postal county for the mainland part of Ross and Cromarty, including the parts which had been in Cromartyshire. Postal counties were officially discontinued in 1996.

In 1975, Ross and Cromarty was itself replaced by the Highland region and the Western Isles, under the Local Government (Scotland) Act 1973. A lower-tier district called Ross and Cromarty covering a similar area to the mainland part of the pre-1975 county existed from 1975 to 1996, when the Highland region became a single-tier council area.

There was a Ross-shire constituency of the Parliament of Great Britain from 1708 to 1801, and of the Parliament of the United Kingdom from 1801 to 1832. In 1832 it was merged with the Cromartyshire constituency to form the Ross and Cromarty constituency.

== Geography ==
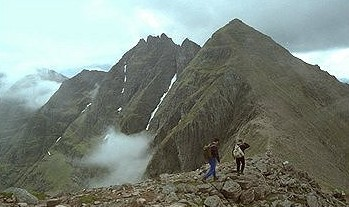
Sgurr Fiona and the Corrag Bhuidhe pinnacles on An Teallach in Wester Ross

Western Ross-shire, also known as Wester Ross, is typified by its mountainous Highland scenery, especially the Torridon Hills which includes such peaks as Beinn Eighe and Liathach. The highest point in the area of the pre-1889 county is Càrn Eighe at 1,183 metres (3,881 feet).

The west coast of mainland Ross-shire onto The Minch and Inner Sound (opposite Skye), is heavily indented with sea lochs and peninsulas. From north to south the chief of these are Loch Broom, the Scoraig peninsula, Little Loch Broom, Gruinard Bay, Rubha Mòr peninsula, Loch Ewe, Rua Reidh/Melvaig peninsula, Loch Gairloch, Loch Torridon, Applecross peninsula, Loch Kishorn, Loch Carron, Lochalsh peninsula, Loch Long, Loch Duich and the Glenelg peninsula (shared with Inverness-shire).

The eastern half (Easter Ross) is generally flatter, and consists of towns, villages and farmland bordering the Moray Firth. In the north Dornoch Firth separates the county from Sutherland. In the north-east can be found the hammerhead-shaped Tarbat peninsula which was shared with Cromartyshire; across Cromarty Firth lies the Black Isle (actually a peninsula not an island), which was also shared with Cromartyshire. To the south-east Beauly Firth forms the border with Inverness-shire.

The county contains numerous lochs, some of which have been enlarged to use as reservoirs. The larger inland lochs are: (Note: Being the lochs (excluding sea lochs) shown on modern Ordnance Survey 1:50,000 maps labelled in all capital letters.)

- Fionn Loch
- Loch Cluanie
- Loch Damh
- Loch Fannich
- Loch Glass
- Loch Langabhat (on Lewis)
- Loch Loyne
- Loch Luichart
- Loch Maree
- Loch Mullardoch
- Orrin Reservoir

=== Islands ===
Ross-shire included the northern parts of the Outer Hebrides, in particular the Isle of Lewis. Lewis is not an island on its own but forms part of the larger island of Lewis and Harris, which is the largest island of the Outer Hebrides and the third largest in the British Isles after Britain and Ireland. Harris is in Inverness-shire. Due to its flatter, more fertile land, Lewis contains three-quarters of the population of the Western Isles, and the largest settlement, Stornoway. The only other island in the Outer Hebrides that was in Ross-shire prior to 1889 and was inhabited at the 2011 census was Great Bernera, which is linked to Lewis by a bridge. Ross-shire also included some small and now uninhabited islands, including the remote Flannan Isles to the west of Lewis. About 71 kilometres (44 miles) north of the Butt of Lewis lie North Rona and Sula Sgeir, a remote group of islands which were included within Ross-shire.

Ross-shire also included numerous islands closer to the west coast of the mainland. Only two were inhabited at 2011, being Dry Island in Loch Gairloch and the Isle of Ewe in Loch Ewe. Tanera Mòr in Loch Broom was part of Ross-shire when the shire was first created, but became part of Cromartyshire as part of the late 17th century boundary changes.

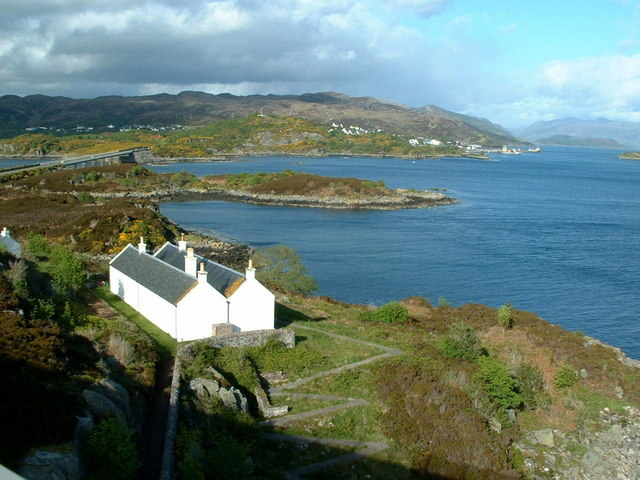
Eilean Bàn from the Skye Bridge, looking towards Kyle of Lochalsh

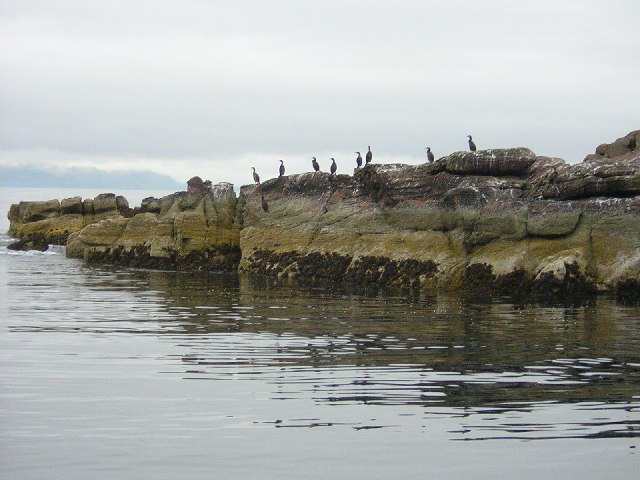
Shag birds on Longa Island

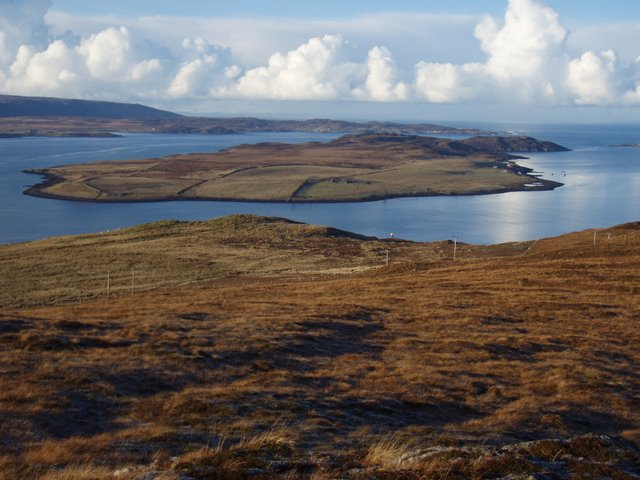
The Isle of Ewe

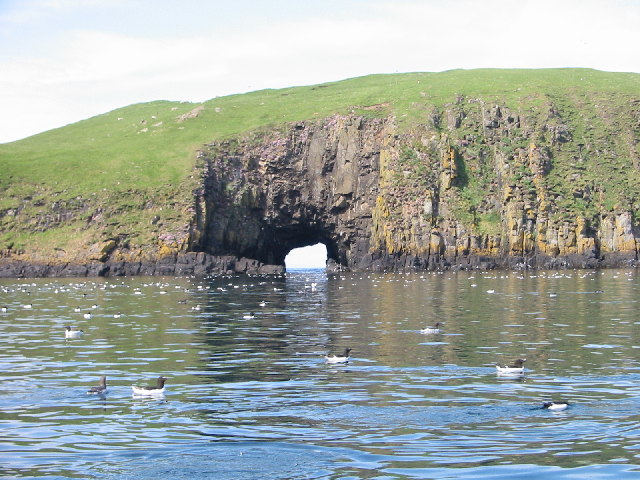
Cave on Garbh Eilean, Shiant Islands

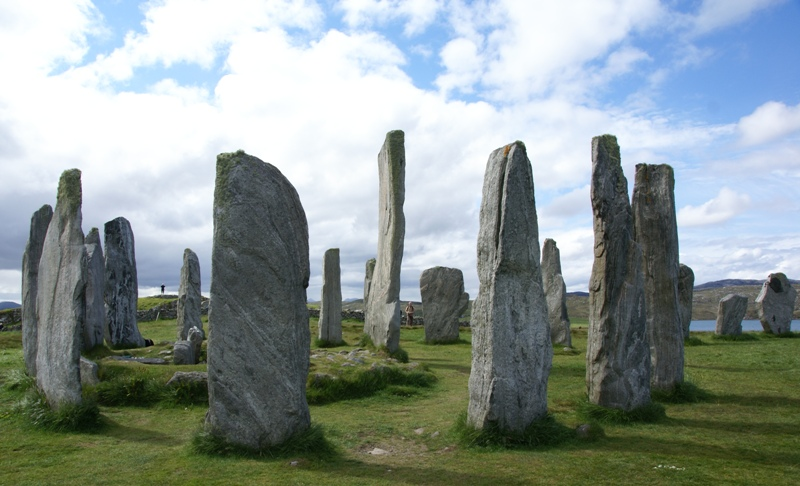
The Callanish Stones on Lewis

== Settlements ==
=== Mainland ===
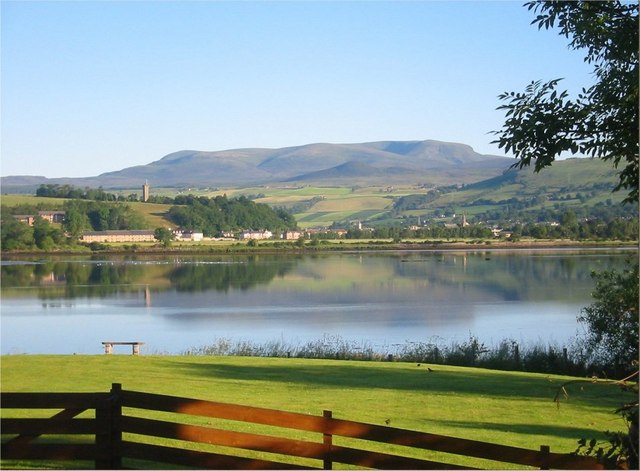
Dingwall, with Ben Wyvis in the distance

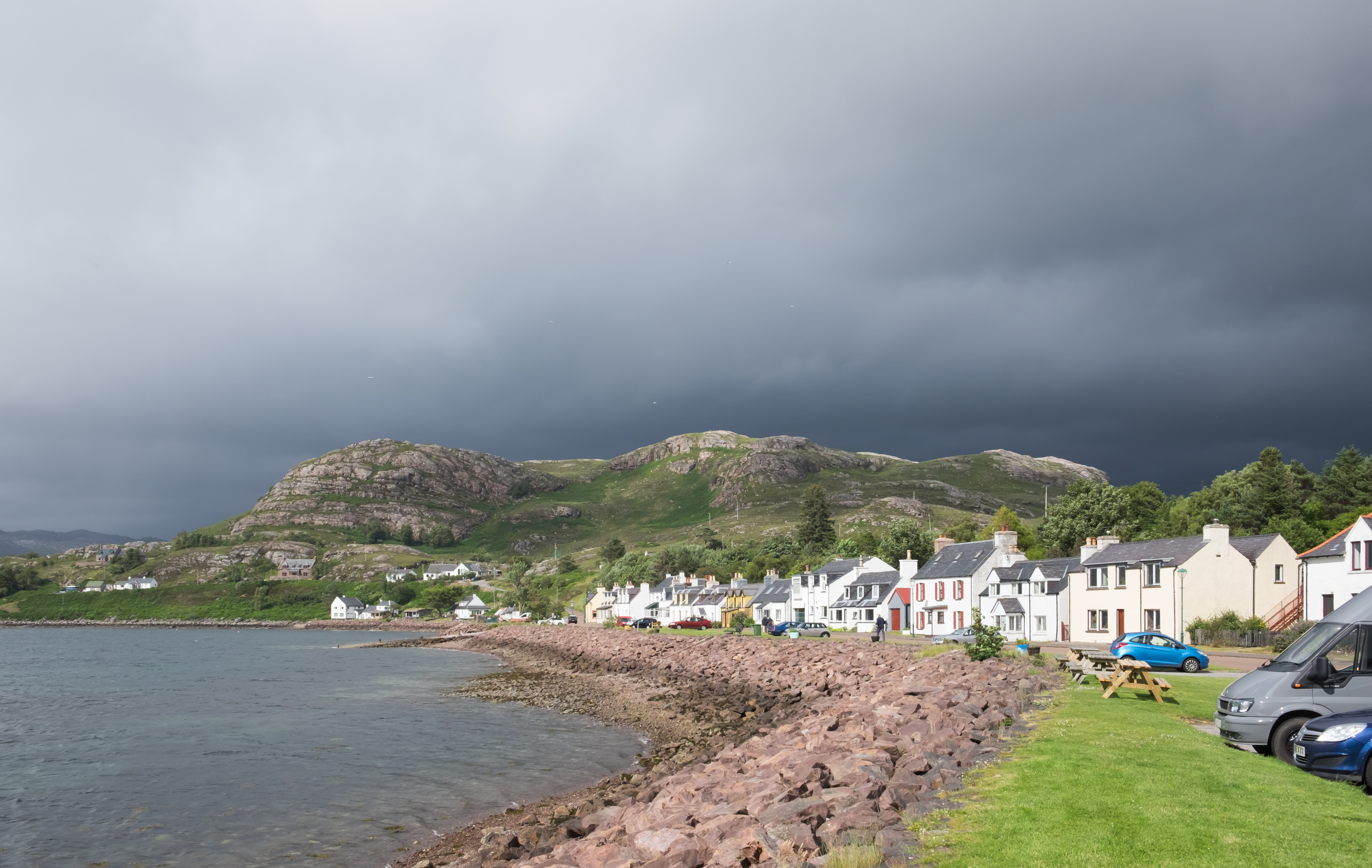
Shieldaig

- Achnasheen
- Alness
- Applecross
- Ardgay
- Aultbea
- Avoch
- Barbaraville
- Conon Bridge
- Contin
- Culrain
- Diabaig
- Dingwall
- Dornie
- Easter Fearn
- Edderton
- Evanton
- Fearn
- Fortrose
- Garve
- Gairloch
- Hill of Fearn
- Invergordon
- Inverinate
- Kilmuir, Black Isle
- Kilmuir, Easter Ross
- Kinlochewe
- Kyle of Lochalsh
- Laide
- Marybank
- Muir of Ord
- Munlochy
- Nigg
- North Kessock
- Poolewe
- Shieldaig
- Strathcarron
- Strathpeffer
- Stromeferry
- Tain
- Torridon

=== Isle of Lewis ===
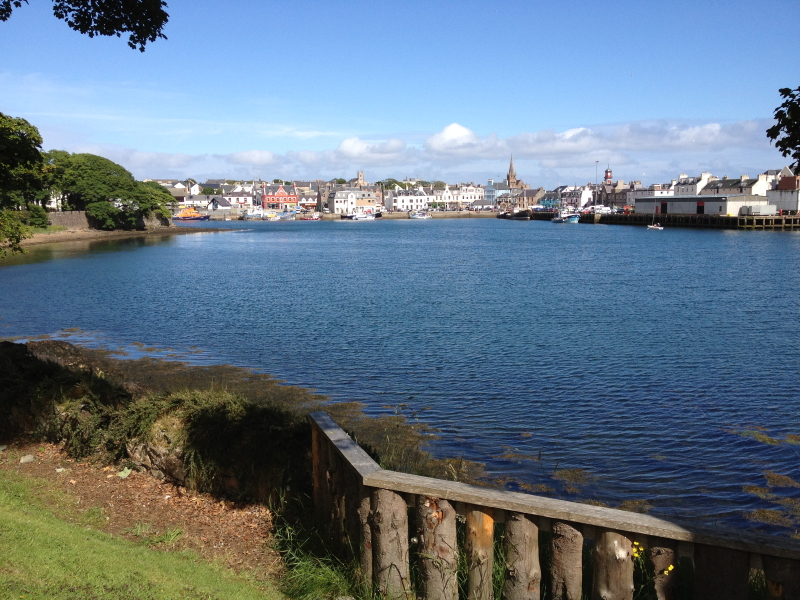
Stornoway

- Achmore
- Adabrock
- Aignish
- Aird
- Aird Uig
- Arnol
- Back
- Balallan
- Ballantrushal
- Barvas
- Borve
- Bragar
- Branahuie
- Brue
- Breaclete
- Breanish
- Breasclete
- Calbost
- Callanish
- Carloway
- Cliff
- Coll
- Cromore
- Cross
- Crossbost
- Dalbeg
- Eorodale
- Eoropie
- Fivepenny
- Flesherin
- Garynahine
- Gisla
- Gravir
- Gress
- Habost
- Holm
- Keose
- Kirkibost
- Kneep
- Knockaird
- Laxdale
- Leurbost
- Lionel
- Lower Bayble
- Marybank
- Melbost
- Newmarket
- Newvalley
- North Dell
- North Tolsta
- Orinsay
- Parkend
- Plasterfield
- Portnaguran
- Port of Ness
- Portvoller
- Sandwick
- Shader
- Shawbost
- Shulishader
- Skigersta
- South Dell
- South Galson
- Steinish
- Stornoway
- Swainbost
- Timsgarry
- Tong
- Upper Bayble

== Parishes ==
In the medieval period the area was divided into the following parishes:

1. Alness
2. Applecross
3. Avoch
4. Barvas (on the Isle of Lewis)
5. Contin
6. Cullicudden
7. Dingwall or Inverferan
8. Edderton
9. Eye (on the Isle of Lewis)
10. Fodderty
11. Gairloch
12. Kilchrist or Tarradale
13. Killearnan aka Ederdour
14. Kilmuir Easter
15. Kilmuir Wester
16. Kiltearn
17. Kincardine
18. Kinnettes
19. Kintail
20. Kirkmichael
21. Lemlair
22. Lochalsh, aka Kilchoan
23. Lochbroom
24. Lochcarron
25. Logie Easter
26. Logie Wester or Logiebride
27. Ness (on the Isle of Lewis)
28. Nigg
29. Nonakiln
30. Rosemarkie
31. Rosskeen
32. Suddy
33. Tain
34. Tarbat
35. Uig (on the Isle of Lewis)
36. Urquhart
37. Urray

These were all in the Diocese of Ross, apart from the parishes on Lewis which were in the Diocese of the Isles.

After the extension of Cromartyshire in the late 17th century, several of the parishes included detached parts of that county; the only parish that was entirely in Cromartyshire was Cromarty itself.

In common with other parts of Scotland, several parishes were suppressed, united or merged in the century or so following the Reformation:

- Applecross was merged into Lochcarron, but then re-created in 1726.
- Ness was split between Eye (which was renamed Stornoway) and Barvas.
- At an unknown date Lochs (Lewis) was created.
- Kinnettes was absorbed into Fodderty.
- Kilchrist was absorbed into Urray in 1574.
- Lemlair was absorbed into Kiltearn in 1618.
- The parish of Fearn was created out of part of Tarbat in 1626.
- Cullicudden and Kirkmichael were united c. 1700 to form the parish of Resolis.
- Nonakiln was absorbed into Rosskeen c. 1714.
- The parish of Glenshiel was created out of part of Kintail in 1726.
- Kilmuir Wester and Suddy were united in 1750 to form the parish of Knockbain.
- Urquhart and Logie Wester were united in 1845.

== See also ==
- Mormaer of Ross
- Bishop of Ross
- James McKenzie
