= Ross and Cromarty =

Historic county and registration county of Scotland

Ross and Cromarty Ros agus Cromba (Scottish Gaelic)
- Historic county
- County of Ross and Cromarty (1889–1975)
- Area
  - Coordinates: 57°40′N 5°00′W

Ross and Cromarty (Scottish Gaelic: Ros agus Cromba) is an area in the Highlands and Islands of Scotland. In modern usage, it is a registration county and a lieutenancy area. Between 1889 and 1975 it was a county.

Historically, Ross-shire and Cromartyshire were separate counties, with Cromartyshire comprising a number of disconnected tracts of land scattered across Ross-shire. The two counties shared a sheriff from 1748, and were both included in the Ross and Cromarty constituency from 1832. They were formally united into a single county called Ross and Cromarty in 1889.

The mainland part of the county had a coast to the east onto the Moray Firth, and a coast to the west onto the Minch. Much of the mainland is sparsely populated, including parts of the Northwest Highlands mountains. The mainland's principal towns are all on the east coast, including Dingwall (the county town), Alness, Cromarty, Fortrose, Invergordon and Tain. The largest settlement on the west coast was the village of Ullapool. The county also covered parts of the Outer Hebrides, principally the Isle of Lewis, including the town of Stornoway. The neighbouring counties were Sutherland to the north and Inverness-shire to the south.

The county ceased to be used for local government purposes in 1975. Since then, the mainland has been part of the Highland region, which became a single-tier council area in 1996. The Outer Hebrides parts of the county became part of the Western Isles, which since 1998 has used only the Scots Gaelic version of its name, Na h-Eileanan an Iar. The pre-1975 county boundaries are still used for certain functions, being a registration county. There was a local government district called Ross and Cromarty from 1975 to 1996, which was a lower-tier district within the Highland region, covering most but not all of the mainland part of the pre-1975 county.

The Ross and Cromarty lieutenancy area, which prior to 1975 had been the county, was redefined in 1975 to be the Ross and Cromarty district plus the neighbouring Skye and Lochalsh district. The registration county and lieutenancy area therefore have slightly different definitions. Notable differences are that the registration county includes the Isle of Lewis and Kincardine, which are not in the lieutenancy area, whereas the lieutenancy area includes the Isle of Skye, which is not in the registration county. The lieutenancy area is 8,019 square kilometres (3,096 square miles) in extent.

== History ==
=== Before 1889 ===
The mainland part of Ross and Cromarty broadly corresponds to the ancient province of Ross. This area was claimed by the Scottish crown from 1098, having previously been under Norwegian overlordship. It was initially included within the shire of Inverness following its incorporation into Scotland.

By the mid-13th century there were sheriffs based at Cromarty and Dingwall, both within the province of Ross, but each appears to have had only a small area of jurisdiction around those towns, rather than the larger territories usually given to sheriffs. The Sheriff of Inverness was therefore still responsible for most of Ross. The position of Sheriff of Dingwall did not endure. After a couple of abortive attempts, the rest of Ross was eventually separated from Inverness-shire in 1661, being given its own Sheriff of Ross and becoming Ross-shire.

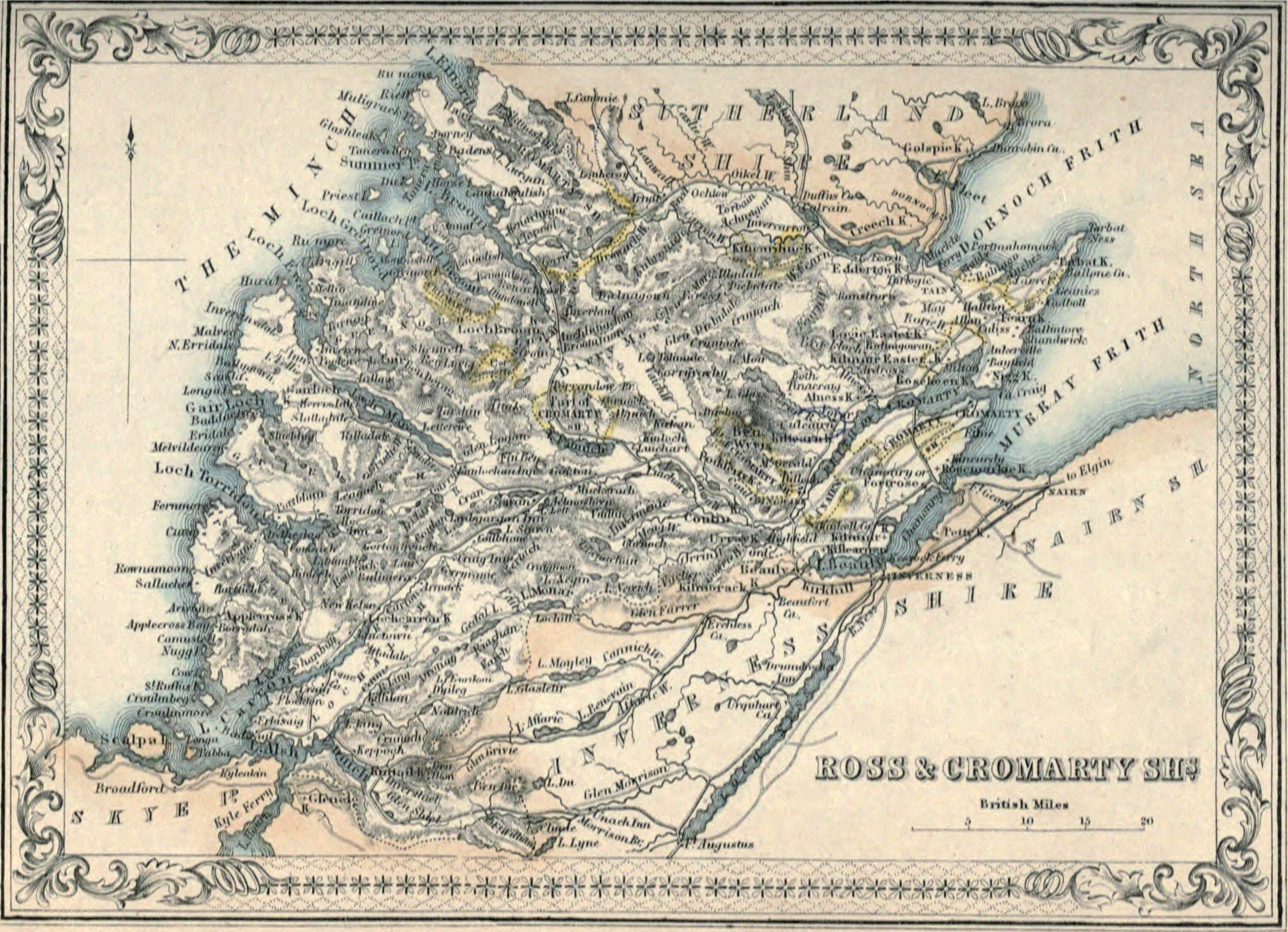
1861 map of Cromartyshire and mainland Ross-shire

The interests of landowners led to some variations in the 1661 definition of Ross-shire from the old province of Ross. In particular, the Isle of Lewis had not been in Ross but was included in Ross-shire on account of being owned by Kenneth Mackenzie, 3rd Earl of Seaforth, a major landowner in Ross. Conversely, an area north of the River Beauly including Beauly and Kilmorack had been in Ross but was excluded from Ross-shire on account of being owned by Clan Fraser of Lovat, based in Inverness-shire. Likewise the Ferintosh estate on the Black Isle was made an exclave of Nairnshire on account of being owned by the Forbes family. The small shire of Cromarty (which still just covered that town and its immediate vicinity) retained its independence. Cromartyshire was significantly enlarged in the late 17th century to gain numerous separate tracts of land scattered across Ross-shire which were owned by George Mackenzie, Viscount of Tarbat, who owned the barony of Cromarty.

Following the Jacobite rising of 1745, the government passed the Heritable Jurisdictions (Scotland) Act 1746, returning the appointment of sheriffs to the crown in those cases where they had become hereditary positions, as had been the case for the Sheriff of Cromarty. The scope for a major landowner or clan chief to control the office of sheriff, which had been the major cause of Cromartyshire being separated from Ross-shire, was therefore greatly reduced. From 1748 the government merged the positions of Sheriff of Ross and Sheriff of Cromarty into a single position.

Despite sharing a sheriff from 1748, Ross-shire and Cromartyshire remained legally separate counties. They retained separate Commissioners of Supply (established in 1667), and from 1794 each appointed their own lord-lieutenants. From 1860 the commissioners of supply for the two counties were directed to work together on delivering some functions, notably relating to prisons.

=== County ===
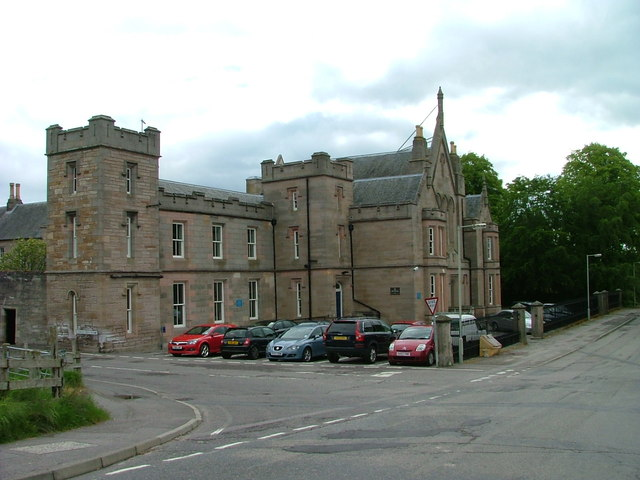
Dingwall Sheriff Court

The county of Ross and Cromarty was created under the Local Government (Scotland) Act 1889, covering the combined area of the two former counties of Ross-shire and Cromartyshire. The new county came into being on the passing of the act on 26 August 1889, from when the previously separate commissioners of supply for each former county merged into a single body, and the last Lord Lieutenant of Ross-shire, Kenneth Smith Mackenzie, became the first Lord Lieutenant of Ross and Cromarty.

The act also established elected county councils, which came into effect in 1890, taking over most of the functions of the commissioners (which were eventually abolished in 1930). The new Ross and Cromarty County Council held its first official meeting on 8 May 1890 at Dingwall Sheriff Court, which had been built in the 1840s as the main courthouse for Ross-shire and had also served as the meeting place for the commissioners. Kenneth Smith Mackenzie, already the lord lieutenant and a major landowner in the county, was also appointed the first convener of the county council.

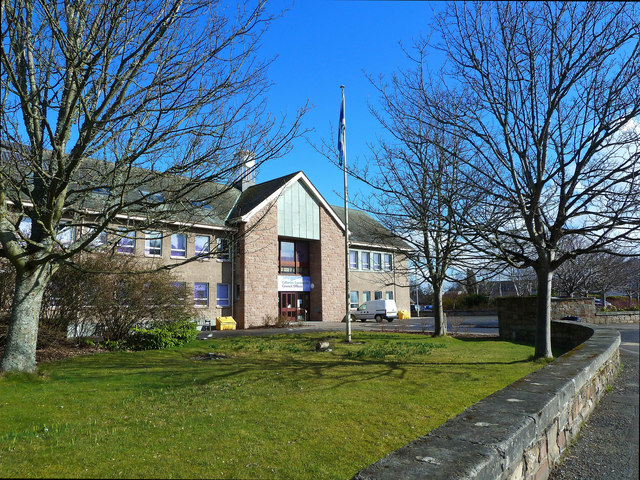
County Buildings, Dingwall, built 1965 as headquarters of Ross and Cromarty County Council

The act also led to a review of boundaries, with exclaves being transferred to a county they actually bordered, and parish and county boundaries being adjusted to eliminate cases where parishes straddled county boundaries. The main exclaves in the area prior to the act had been the many parts of Cromartyshire scattered across Ross-shire, which were resolved as a result of the two counties merging into one. After the merger, there still remained an exclave of Nairnshire at the Ferintosh estate on the Black Isle, whilst the parish of Urray straddled Inverness-shire and Ross and Cromarty. Ferintosh was transferred to Ross and Cromarty, and the parts of Urray in Inverness-shire were transferred to the Inverness-shire parish of Kilmorack. These boundary changes (and others to eliminate exclaves in parish boundaries) took effect in 1891.

Despite the creation of Ross and Cromarty in 1889, the Royal Mail used 'Ross-shire' as the name of the postal county for the mainland part of Ross and Cromarty, including the parts which had been in Cromartyshire. Postal counties were officially discontinued in 1996.

Although the county was officially called Ross and Cromarty, the names 'Ross County Council' and 'Ross-shire County Council' were both also used for its county council in the media. Ross and Cromarty County Council built itself a new headquarters at County Buildings in Dingwall in 1965.

=== Since 1975 ===
Local government was reformed in 1975 under the Local Government (Scotland) Act 1973, which replaced Scotland's counties, burghs and landward districts with a two-tier structure of upper-tier regions and lower-tier districts for most of Scotland. A single-tier structure of island areas was used for Orkney, Shetland and the Western Isles. The mainland of Ross and Cromarty became part of the Highland Region, whilst the Outer Hebrides parts (the landward district of Lewis and burgh of Stornoway) became part of the Western Isles.

The part of Ross and Cromarty which went to the Highland region was split between three lower-tier districts.

- Ross and Cromarty district, covering most of the mainland of the pre-1975 county, and the nearby islands that were not transferred to the Western Isles.
- Skye and Lochalsh district, covering the Isle of Skye district from Inverness-shire plus the South West District from Ross and Cromarty (comprising the parishes of Glenshiel, Kintail, and Lochalsh).
- Sutherland district, covering most of the pre-1975 county of Sutherland, plus the parish of Kincardine from Ross and Cromarty.

As part of the 1975 reforms, the last lord lieutenant of the county of Ross and Cromarty, Alexander Francis Matheson, became lord lieutenant of the new Ross and Cromarty lieutenancy area, which was defined as the combined area of the new Ross and Cromarty district plus the Skye and Lochalsh district.

The Ross and Cromarty District Council was based at the former county council's headquarters at County Buildings in Dingwall. Throughout the district's existence from 1975 to 1996, a majority of the seats were held by independent councillors.

Further local government reforms in 1996 under the Local Government etc. (Scotland) Act 1994 saw the regions and districts created in 1975 abolished and replaced with single-tier council areas. The former Highland region became one of the new council areas. The lieutenancy areas continue to be defined as they had been in 1975 despite the abolition of the districts on which they were based. The boundaries of the historic county of Ross and Cromarty (as it was following the 1891 boundary changes) are still used for some limited official purposes connected with land registration, being a registration county.

In 1998 the Western Isles Council formally changed the English language version of the area's name from Western Isles to Na h-Eileanan an Iar (Scots Gaelic for 'Western Isles'), to be used in both English and Gaelic contexts.

== Geography ==
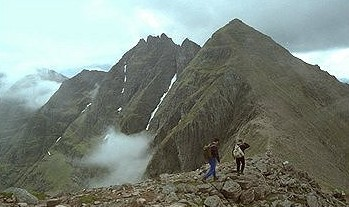
Sgurr Fiona and the Corrag Bhuidhe pinnacles on An Teallach in Wester Ross

The western part of the county of Ross and Cromarty, also known as Wester Ross, is typified by its mountainous Highland scenery, especially the Torridon Hills which includes such peaks as Beinn Eighe and Liathach. The highest point in the county is Càrn Eighe at 1,183 metres (3,881 feet).

The west coast of the mainland onto The Minch and Inner Sound (opposite Skye), is heavily indented with sea lochs and peninsulas. From north to south the chief of these are the Coigach peninsula, Loch Broom, the Scoraig peninsula, Little Loch Broom, Gruinard Bay, Rubha Mòr peninsula, Loch Ewe, Rua Reidh/Melvaig peninsula, Loch Gairloch, Loch Torridon, Applecross peninsula, Loch Kishorn, Loch Carron, Lochalsh peninsula, Loch Long, Loch Duich and the Glenelg peninsula which is shared with Inverness-shire.

The eastern part (Easter Ross) is generally flatter, and consists of towns, villages and farmland bordering the Moray Firth. In the north Dornoch Firth separates the county from Sutherland. In the north-east can be found the hammerhead-shaped Tarbat peninsula; across Cromarty Firth lies the Black Isle (actually a peninsula not an island). To the south-east Beauly Firth forms the border with Inverness-shire.

The county contains numerous lochs, some of which have been enlarged to use as reservoirs. The larger inland lochs are: (Note: Being the lochs (excluding sea lochs) shown on modern Ordnance Survey 1:50,000 maps labelled in all capital letters.)

- Fionn Loch
- Loch Cluanie
- Loch Damh
- Loch Fannich
- Loch Glass
- Loch Langabhat (on Lewis)
- Loch Loyne
- Loch Luichart
- Loch Maree
- Loch Mullardoch
- Orrin Reservoir

=== Islands ===
The county of Ross and Cromarty includes the northern parts of the Outer Hebrides, in particular the Isle of Lewis. Lewis is not an island on its own but forms part of the larger island of Lewis and Harris, which is the largest island of the Outer Hebrides and the third largest in the British Isles after Britain and Ireland. Harris is in Inverness-shire. Due to its flatter, more fertile land, Lewis contains three-quarters of the population of the Western Isles, and the largest settlement, Stornoway. The only other island in the Outer Hebrides that is in the county of Ross and Cromarty and was inhabited at the 2011 census was Great Bernera, which is linked to Lewis by a bridge. Ross and Cromarty also included some small and now uninhabited islands, including the remote Flannan Isles to the west of Lewis. About 71 kilometres (44 miles) north of the Butt of Lewis lie North Rona and Sula Sgeir, a remote group of islands which were included within Ross and Cromarty.

The county also includes numerous smaller islands closer to the west coast of the mainland. Only three were inhabited at 2011, being Dry Island in Loch Gairloch, the Isle of Ewe in Loch Ewe, and Tanera Mòr in Loch Broom.

The Isle of Skye and several of its smaller neighbouring islands form part of the Ross and Cromarty lieutenancy area, but they form part of the registration county and historic county of Inverness-shire.

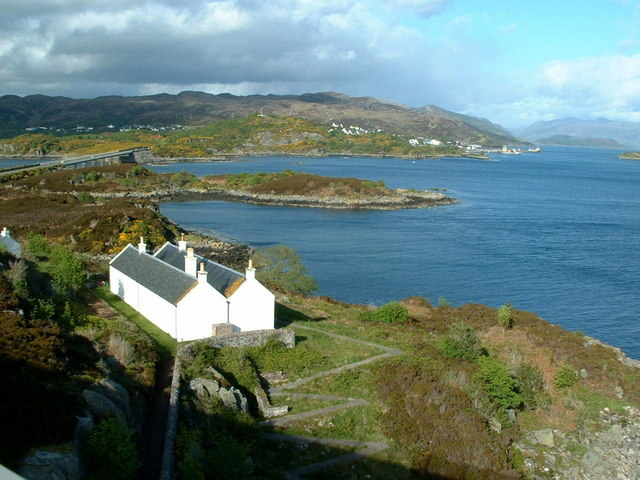
Eilean Bàn from the Skye Bridge, looking towards Kyle of Lochalsh

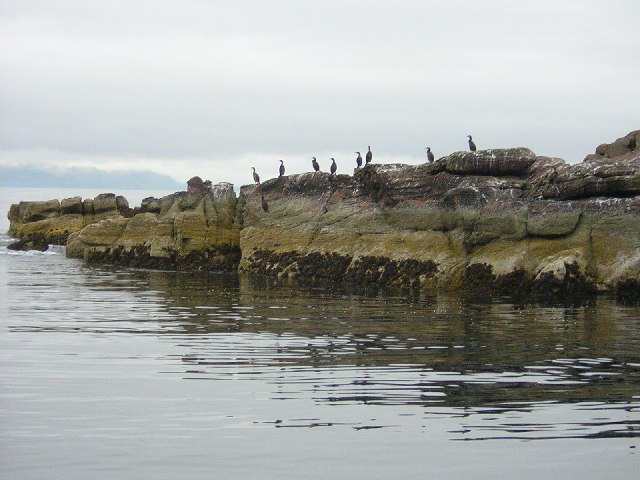
Shag birds on Longa Island

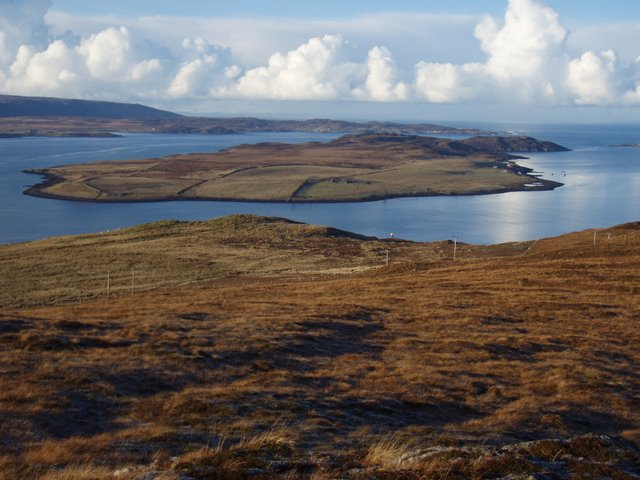
The Isle of Ewe

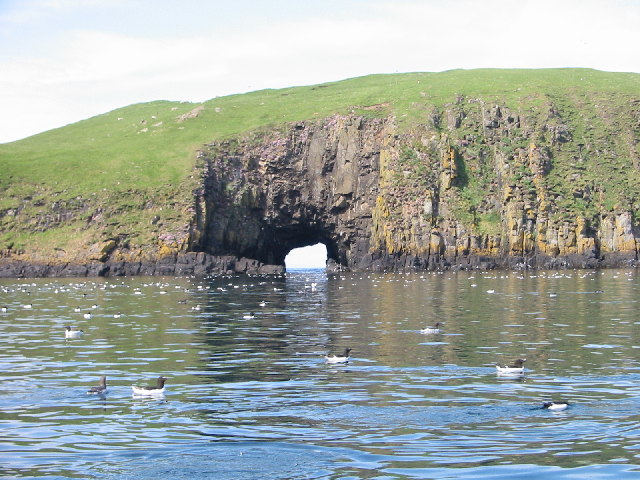
Cave on Garbh Eilean, Shiant Islands

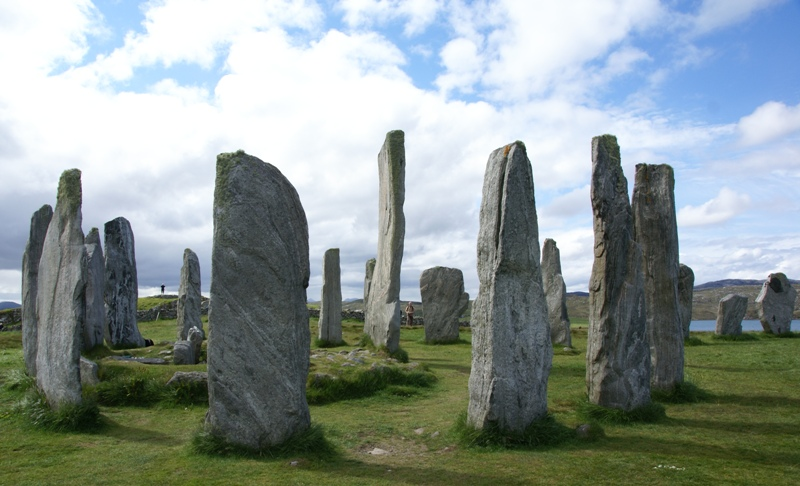
The Callanish Stones on Lewis

== Economy and population ==
The main economic activities in Ross and Cromarty are crofting, fishing and tourism.

The parishes which make up the registration county (being the pre-1975 county) had a population of 77,382 at the 2011 census. The lieutenancy area (including Skye but excluding Lewis and Kincardine) had a population of 67,253.

== Civil parishes ==
Parishes existed from medieval times. From 1845 to 1894 they had parish boards and from 1894 to 1930 they had parish councils. They have had no administrative functions since 1930, but continue to be used for the presentation of statistics.

Following the 1891 boundary changes, the county of Ross and Cromarty contained the following civil parishes:

1. Alness
2. Applecross
3. Avoch
4. Barvas (on Lewis)
5. Contin
6. Cromarty (included burgh of same name)
7. Dingwall (included burgh of same name)
8. Edderton
9. Fearn
10. Fodderty
11. Gairloch
12. Glenshiel
13. Killearnan
14. Kilmuir Easter
15. Kiltearn
16. Kincardine
17. Kintail
18. Knockbain
19. Lochalsh
20. Lochbroom
21. Lochcarron
22. Lochs (on Lewis)
23. Logie Easter
24. Nigg
25. Resolis
26. Rosemarkie (included burgh of Fortrose)
27. Rosskeen (included burgh of Invergordon)
28. Stornoway (included burgh of same name, on Lewis)
29. Tain (included burgh of same name)
30. Tarbat
31. Uig (on Lewis)
32. Urquhart and Logie Wester
33. Urray

== Transport ==
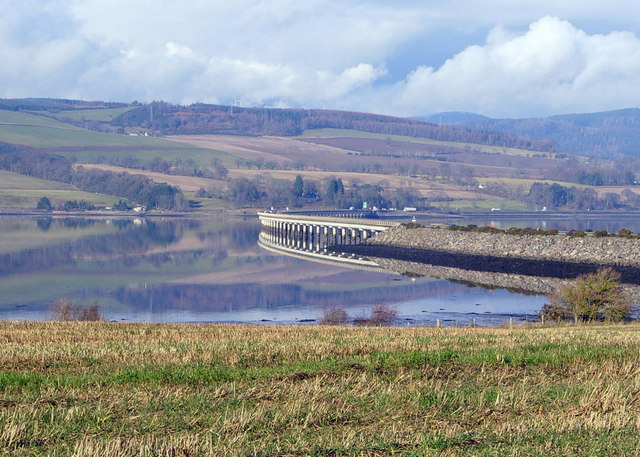
Cromarty Bridge

The Kyle of Lochalsh railway line traverses the county west–east, terminating at Inverness. The Far North Line goes north–south along the east coast, connecting Inverness in the south with Thurso and Wick in the north.

The Black Isle is connected by bridge to the 'mainland' - Cromarty Bridge in the north-west and the Kessock Bridge in the south-west. At the tip of the peninsula a ferry provides access to the Tarbat peninsula. The Skye Bridge links Kyle of Lochalsh to the isle of Skye.

Various buses operated by Stagecoach Group link the major towns of the east coast, with the 61 bus connecting Ullapool to Inverness. The latter route is also served by Scottish Citylink in the summer, continuing on to Glasgow. Various independent bus companies link the smaller towns of Wester Ross, though online information is limited.

A ferry connects Stornoway on Lewis with Ullapool on the mainland, taking about three hours.

The county contains one airport - Stornoway - which provides passenger flights to destinations within Scotland as well as London Southend.

== Settlements ==
=== Mainland ===
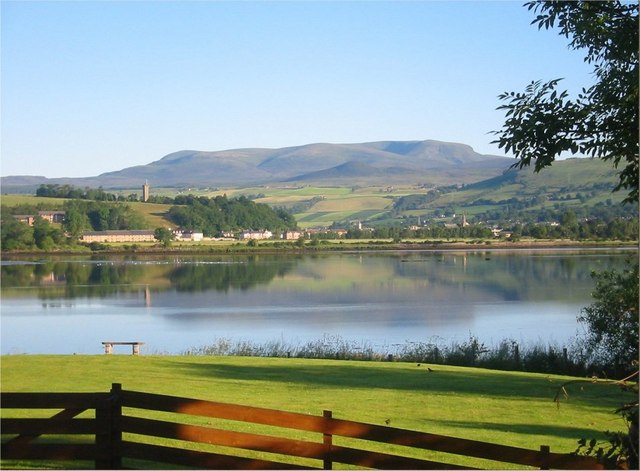
Dingwall, with Ben Wyvis in the distance

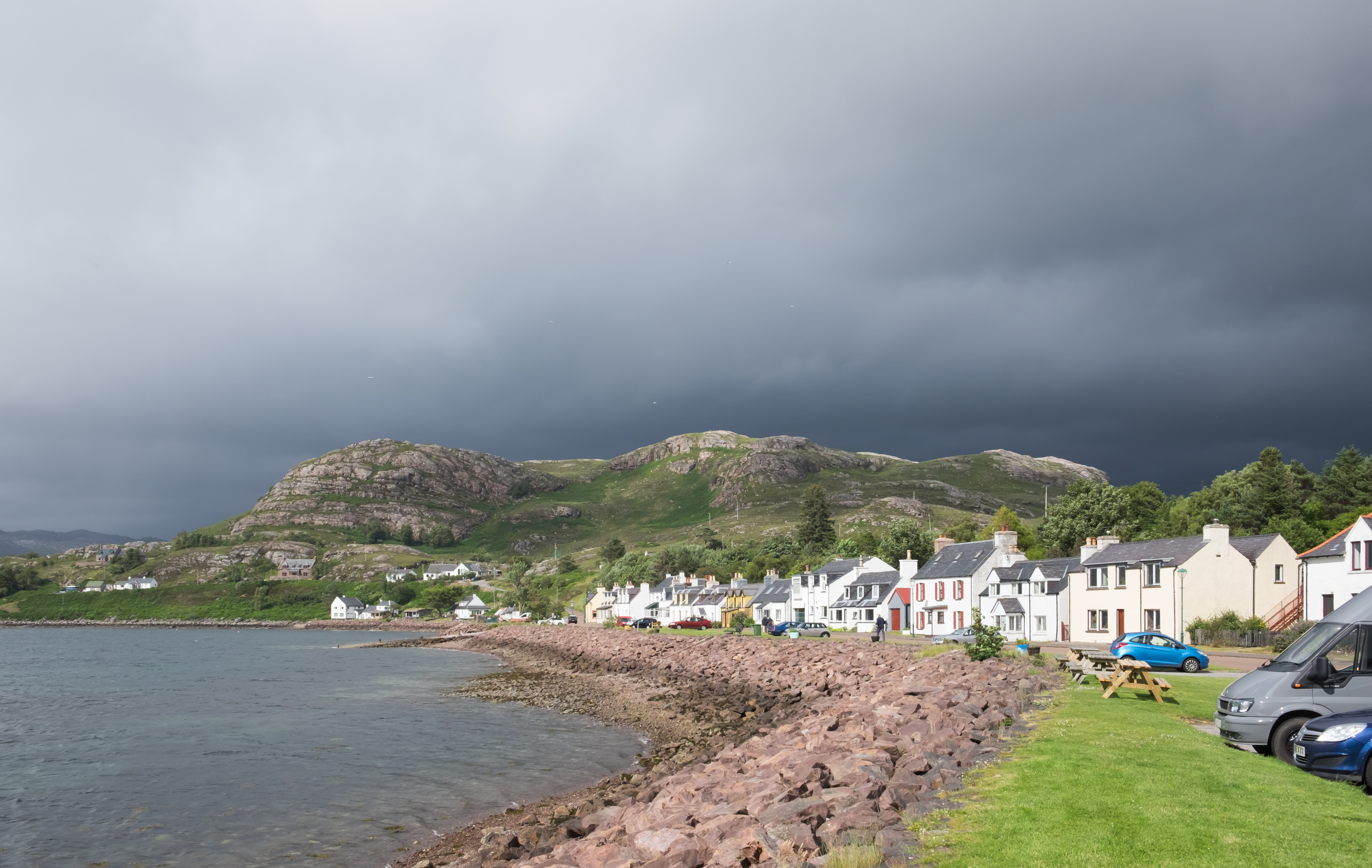
Shieldaig

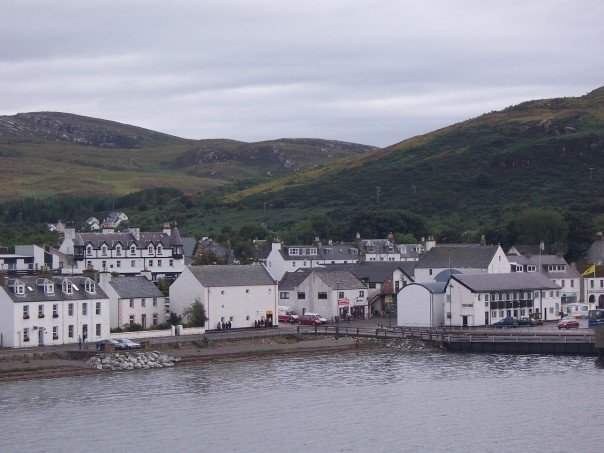
Ullapool

- Achnasheen
- Achiltibuie
- Alness
- Altandhu
- Applecross
- Ardgay
- Aultbea
- Avoch
- Badenscallie
- Balintore
- Barbaraville
- Conon Bridge
- Contin
- Cromarty
- Culbokie
- Culrain
- Diabaig
- Dingwall
- Dornie
- Dundonnell
- Edderton
- Evanton
- Fearn
- Fortrose
- Garve
- Gairloch
- Hill of Fearn
- Inver
- Invergordon
- Inverinate
- Inverness
- Jemimaville
- Kildary
- Kilmuir, Black Isle
- Kilmuir, Easter Ross
- Kinlochewe
- Kyle of Lochalsh
- Laide
- Lochcarron
- Marybank
- Maryburgh
- Milton
- Muir of Ord
- Munlochy
- Nigg
- North Kessock
- Polbain
- Polglass
- Poolewe
- Portmahomack
- Rosemarkie
- Shieldaig
- Strathcarron
- Strathpeffer
- Stromeferry
- Tain
- Torridon
- Ullapool

=== Isle of Lewis ===
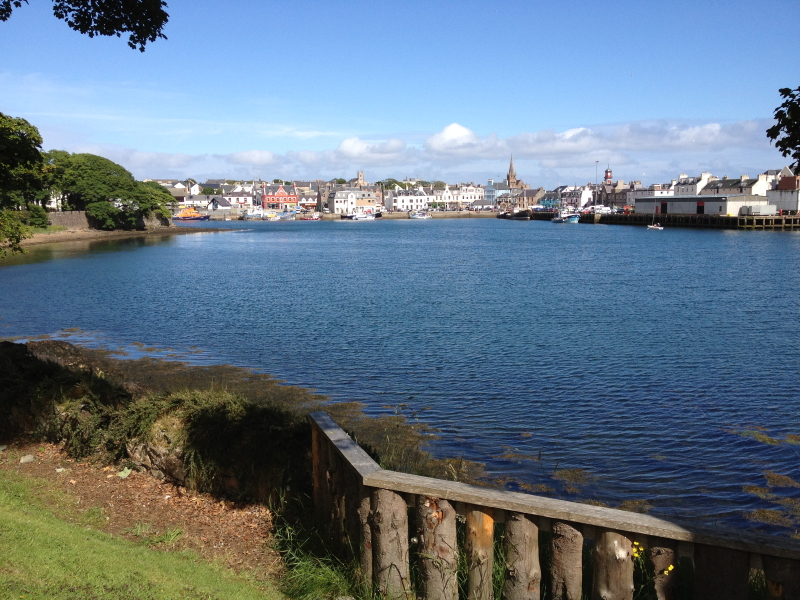
Stornoway

- Achmore
- Adabrock
- Aignish
- Aird
- Aird Uig
- Arnol
- Back
- Balallan
- Ballantrushal
- Barvas
- Borve
- Bragar
- Branahuie
- Brue
- Breaclete
- Breanish
- Breasclete
- Calbost
- Callanish
- Carloway
- Cliff
- Coll
- Cromore
- Cross
- Crossbost
- Dalbeg
- Eorodale
- Eoropie
- Fivepenny
- Flesherin
- Garynahine
- Gisla
- Gravir
- Gress
- Habost
- Holm
- Kirkibost
- Kneep
- Knockaird
- Laxdale
- Leurbost
- Lionel
- Lower Bayble
- Marybank
- Melbost
- Newmarket
- Newvalley
- North Dell
- North Tolsta
- Orinsay
- Parkend
- Plasterfield
- Portnaguran
- Port of Ness
- Portvoller
- Sandwick
- Shader
- Shawbost
- Shulishader
- Skigersta
- South Dell
- South Galson
- Steinish
- Stornoway
- Swainbost
- Timsgarry
- Tong
- Upper Bayble

== Parliamentary constituency ==
The name Ross and Cromarty was first used for the Ross and Cromarty county constituency of the Parliament of the United Kingdom from 1832 to 1983. As created in 1832, the constituency merged two former county constituencies: the Ross-shire constituency and the Cromartyshire constituency, and it elected a Member of Parliament to represent the counties of Ross-shire and Cromartyshire, minus their parliamentary burghs, Dingwall, Tain and Fortrose, which were represented as components of the Wick burghs constituency and the Inverness burghs constituency.

Constituency boundaries were altered in 1918, by the Representation of the People Act 1918, and the Ross and Cromarty constituency acquired the boundaries of the county of Ross and Cromarty, including the former parliamentary burghs, but minus Stornoway and Lewis, which became part of a new constituency, the Western Isles constituency.

In 1983, the Ross, Cromarty and Skye constituency was created to represent the then Ross and Cromarty district and Skye and Lochalsh district. The Kincardine area joined the Caithness and Sutherland constituency.

== See also ==
- List of counties of Scotland 1890–1975
- Medieval Diocese of Ross
- Politics of the Highland council area
