= Lochs, Outer Hebrides =

Civil parish on Isle of Lewis, Scotland

Coordinates: 58.144°N 6.468°W

Lochs: Scottish Gaelic: Sgìre nan Loch
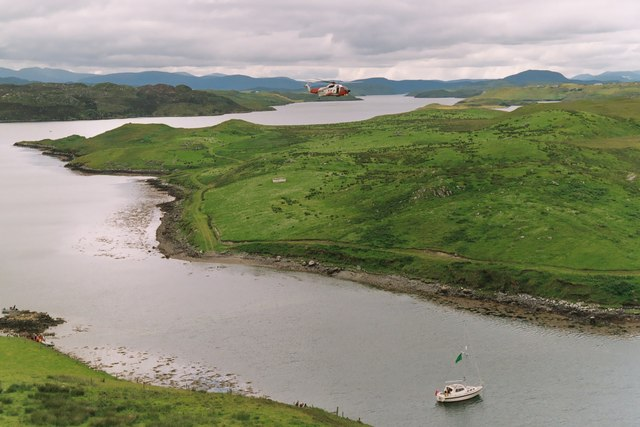
- Loch Erisort

- Location within the Outer Hebrides
- Area: 179.06 sq mi (463.8 km^{2})
- Population: 1,810 (2011)
  - Density: 10/sq mi (3.9/km^{2})
- Language: Scottish Gaelic Gaidhlig; English
- OS grid reference: NB371259
- Civil parish: Lochs
- Council area: Na h-Eileanan Siar
- Lieutenancy area: Western Isles
- Country: Scotland
- Sovereign state: United Kingdom
- Post town: ISLE OF LEWIS
- Postcode district: HS2
- Dialling code: 01851
- Police: Scotland
- Fire: Scottish
- Ambulance: Scottish
- UK Parliament: Na h-Eileanan an Iar
- Scottish Parliament: Na h-Eileanan an Iar

Parish of Lochs (1891)

Lochs is a civil parish on the Isle of Lewis in the Western Isles, Scotland. It is one of the four civil parishes in Lewis and extends over the south-eastern part. It is bordered by the parish of Stornoway in the north and Uig in the west. Loch Seaforth separates it from Harris in the south, apart from a 19 miles (31 kilometres) land border with Harris. It extends about 19 miles (31 kilometres) north to south and 16 miles (26 kilometres) east-west. The Shiant Islands, about five miles (8.0 km) to the south-east, also belong to the parish. The parish is so-named because of the profusion of lochs, sea and fresh-water, in the area.

Lochs does not have a main village, but instead three clusters of townships within the three main divisions of the parish. The northern division, North Lochs, lies between the River Creed (Gaelic: Abhainn Ghrioda), which forms the border with Stornoway parish, and Loch Leurbost. Its main townships are Leurbost and Crossbost on the north side of that loch and also Grimshader and Ranish on either side of Grimshader Loch. The central division called Kinloch lies between Lochs Leurbost and Erisort and its main townships are Keose, Laxay and Balallan on the north side of Loch Erisort, and Arivruaich near the head of Loch Seaforth. The southern division, known as South Lochs or Park (Gaelic: Pairc), is a peninsula between Lochs Erisort and Seaforth. It is joined to the mainland of Lewis by an isthmus about three-quarters mile (1.2 km) wide. The main townships are Orinsay, Gravir, Habost, Caversta, Calbost, and Cromore.

At the 2011 census, the population of the civil parish was 1,810. 62.0% had some knowledge of Gaelic. A hundred years before, in 1911, 91.1% were Gaelic speaking (and 97.5% in 1881). The area of the parish is 114,601 acres (179.1 mi^{2}; 463.8 km^{2}).

The parish originally belonged to the county of Ross and Cromarty. The parish council was formed in 1895 with 11 elected members. This was replaced by Lewis District Council in 1930, which had 19 members, 9 of whom were the County Councillors for Lewis and 10 elected to the District Council from the four parishes. Lochs had 4 members. Since 1976, this has been superseded by a community council for each of three parts of the parish, namely North Lochs, Kinloch and Park. Also Ross and Cromarty county council was replaced by Western Isles Council (now called Comhairle nan Eilean Siar), based in Stornoway.

Lochs is also a ward of Na h-Eileanan an Iar (Western Isles) Council, with 2 members.

The parish was not recorded prior to the Scottish Reformation and was subsequently known as St. Columbkil or Loghur, now Lochs. The old Parish Church, serving the whole parish was erected in 1830 on an island in Keose bay, but is now in ruins. There are now Church of Scotland churches in each of the three parts of the civil parish: Leurbost (for North Lochs), Laxay (for Kinloch) and Lemreway (for Park).

== Landmarks ==
- Eilean Chaluim Chille
- Loch Erisort
- Loch Seaforth

== Settlements ==
=== North Lochs ===
- Leurbost
- Crossbost

=== Kinloch ===
- Airidh a' Bhruaich (Airidhbhruaich)
- Balallan
- Laxay
- Keose and Keose Glebe

=== Park ===
- Orinsay
- Gravir
- Habost
- Caversta
- Calbost
- Cromore
