= Cabharstadh =

Village on the Isle of Lewis, Scotland

Coordinates: 58.091°N 6.472°W

Cabharstadh: Scottish Gaelic: Cabharstaigh
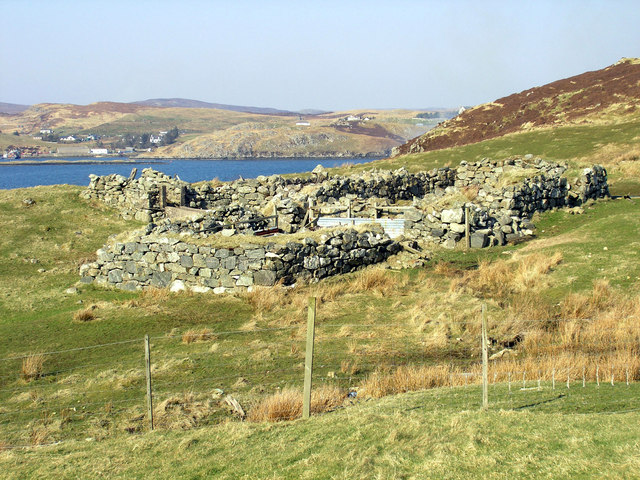
- A ruined blackhouse and enclosures at the end of the Caversta Road

- Location within the Outer Hebrides
- Language: Scottish Gaelic; English
- OS grid reference: NB364200
- Civil parish: Lochs
- Council area: Na h-Eileanan Siar
- Lieutenancy area: Western Isles
- Country: Scotland
- Sovereign state: United Kingdom
- Post town: ISLE OF LEWIS
- Postcode district: HS2
- Dialling code: 01851
- Police: Scotland
- Fire: Scottish
- Ambulance: Scottish
- UK Parliament: Na h-Eileanan an Iar
- Scottish Parliament: Na h-Eileanan an Iar

Cabharstadh or Caversta (Scottish Gaelic: Cabharstaigh) is a village on the Isle of Lewis in the Outer Hebrides, Scotland. Caversta is situated in the district of Pairc, and is within the parish of Lochs.
