= Kilmuir =

Kilmuir (Gaelic: Cill Mhoir or Cille Mhoire) is the name of a number of settlements in Scotland:

- Kilmuir, Skye, on the Trotternish peninsula
- Kilmuir, Black Isle, near North Kessock and Inverness, in the historic parish of Kilmuir Wester
- Kilmuir, Easter Ross, near Kildary and Invergordon, in the historic parish of Kilmuir Easter
- Kilmuir, Duirinish, an area of Dunvegan, on Skye
