= Eilean Chaluim Chille =

Island in the Outer Hebrides, Scotland

Calum Cille (Gaelic)

Location
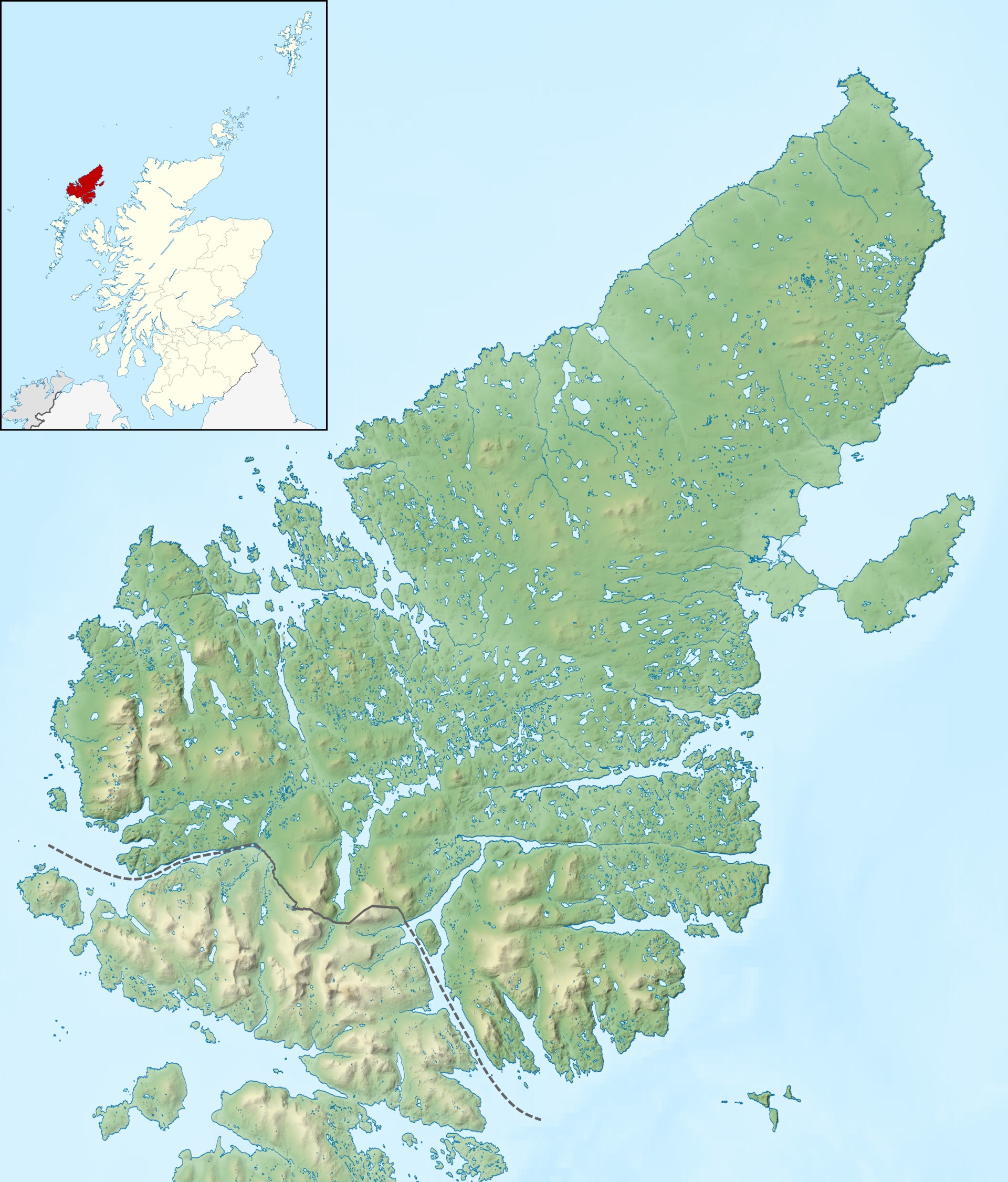
- Eilean Chaluim Chille shown next to Lewis Eilean Chaluim Chille shown within the Outer Hebrides
- OS grid reference: NB385215
- Coordinates: 58.11°N 6.44°W

Name
- Name meaning: island of Saint Columba

Physical geography
- Island group: Lewis and Harris
- Area: 110 ha
- Area rank: 144
- Highest elevation: Creag Mhor 43 m

Administration
- Council area: Na h-Eileanan Siar
- Country: Scotland
- Sovereign state: United Kingdom

Demographics
- Population: 0

Eilean Chaluim Chille (Gaelic: island of Saint Columba, Calum Cille) is an unpopulated island in the Outer Hebrides.

It lies off the east coast of Lewis at the mouth of Loch Erisort. The island reaches a height of 43m (141 feet) in the northeast. At low tide Eilean Chaluim Chille is connected by a causeway to the mainland of Lewis at Crobeag. There are two lochs in the centre of the island.

== History ==
At the southern end of the island lie the ruins of Teampall Chaluim Chille (St Columba's Church). Local tradition has it as the site where Columban monks first arrived in Lewis. Another tradition is that it was built by a man named Columb Kill.

It is cited in a report of 1549 as the main place of worship for the parish of Lochs. There was probably a church there from the medieval period. The cemetery was in use until 1878. Eilean Chaluim Chille is protected by Historic Environment Scotland as a scheduled monument.

Causeway to Eilean Chaluim Chille
