= Leurbost =

Coordinates: 58.144°N 6.468°W

Leurbost: Scottish Gaelic: Liùrbost
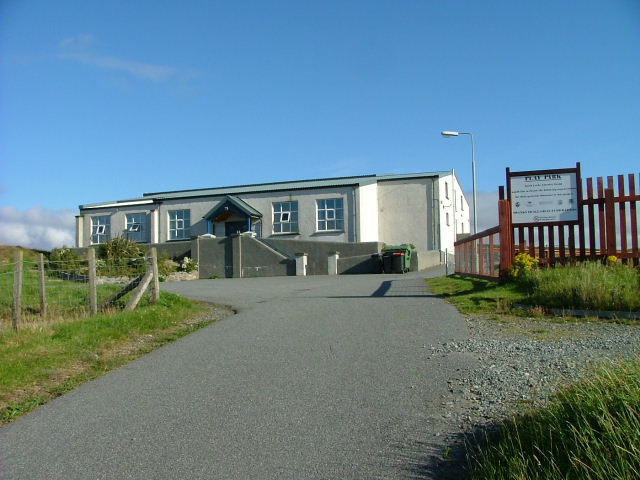
- Leurbost Community Centre

- Location within the Outer Hebrides
- Population: 500
- Language: Scottish Gaelic Gaidhlig; English
- OS grid reference: NB371259
- Civil parish: Lochs
- Council area: Na h-Eileanan Siar
- Lieutenancy area: Western Isles
- Country: Scotland
- Sovereign state: United Kingdom
- Post town: ISLE OF LEWIS
- Postcode district: HS2
- Dialling code: 01851
- Police: Scotland
- Fire: Scottish
- Ambulance: Scottish
- UK Parliament: Na h-Eileanan an Iar
- Scottish Parliament: Na h-Eileanan an Iar

Leurbost (Scottish Gaelic: Liùrbost [ˈʎuːrpɔs̪t̪]) is a village on the east coast of the Isle of Lewis in the Outer Hebrides of Scotland. It is approximately 6 miles (10 kilometres) south of Stornoway on the road to Harris. It is the main settlement in the area of the island known as North Lochs. Leurbost is within the parish of Lochs.

== History ==
In 1856 reports circulated of a 'sea-serpent' in a fresh water loch near the town. The creature, referred to as Searrach Uisge, was said to be eel-like, 40 feet (12 metres) long and raised comparisons to the mythical Kelpie.

== Economy ==
Amenities in the village include a community centre; a school, Sgoil nan Loch (which replaced the old Leurbost as well as Fidigarry (Ranish), Knockiandue (Keose) and Balallan schools); a petrol station and a shop. The school caters for children from nursery age through primary 1–7.
