= Achmore, Lewis =

Coordinates: 58.172°N 6.573°W

Achmore: Scottish Gaelic: An t-Acha Mòr
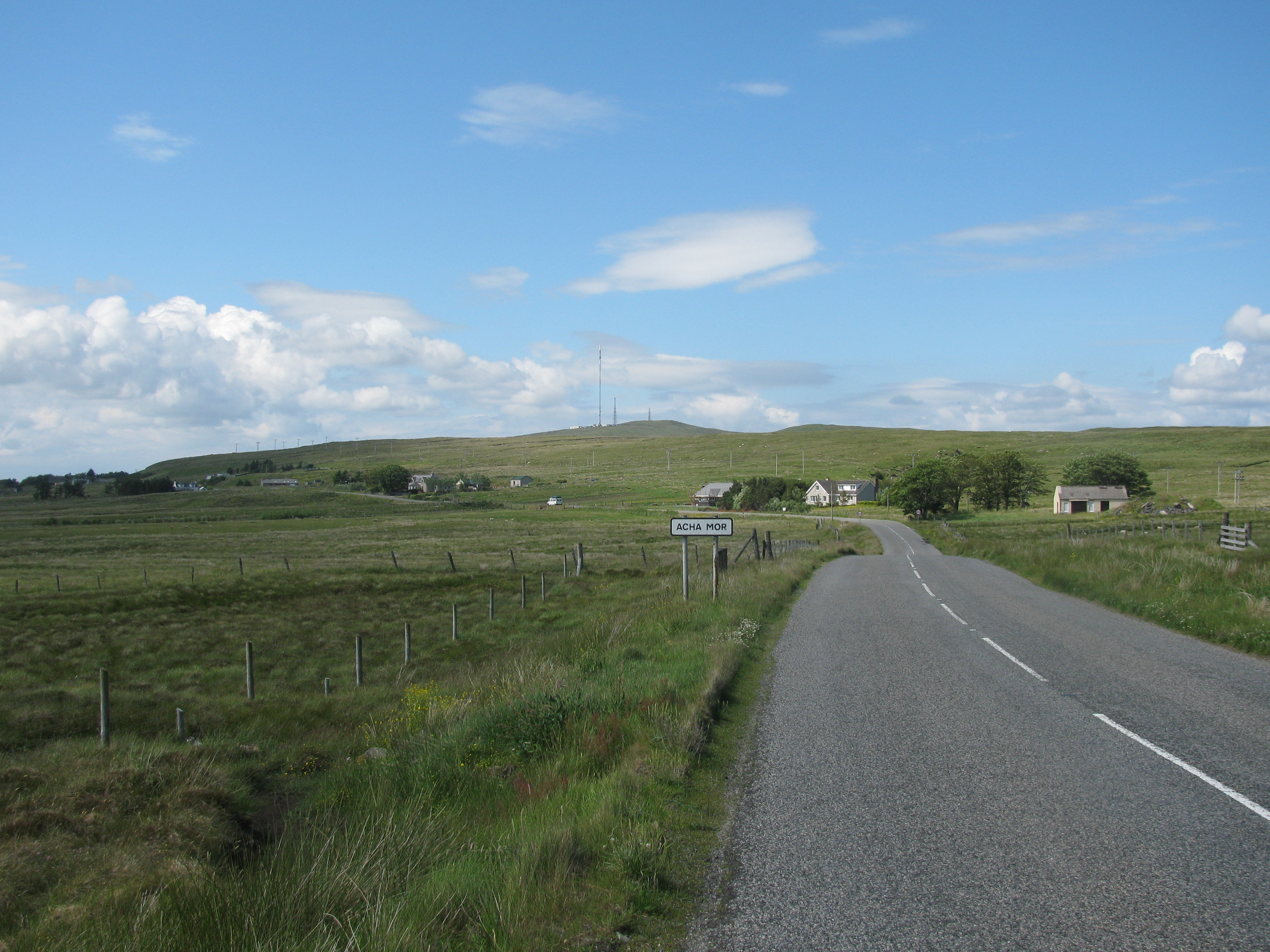
- View of the village from the main road

- Location within the Outer Hebrides
- Language: Scottish Gaelic; English
- OS grid reference: NB311294
- Civil parish: Lochs
- Council area: Na h-Eileanan Siar
- Lieutenancy area: Western Isles
- Country: Scotland
- Sovereign state: United Kingdom
- Post town: ISLE OF LEWIS
- Postcode district: HS2
- Dialling code: 01851
- Police: Scotland
- Fire: Scottish
- Ambulance: Scottish
- UK Parliament: Na h-Eileanan an Iar
- Scottish Parliament: Na h-Eileanan an Iar

Achmore (Scottish Gaelic: An t-Acha Mòr; marked on some maps as Acha Mòr) is a village in the Scottish Outer Hebrides, on the Isle of Lewis. The name means 'big field'. Achmore is within the parish of Lochs and lies on the A858, about 7 miles (11 km) southwest of Stornoway. The village is the only one on Lewis which does not lie on the coast.

The village was one of several that were created in around 1823 in Lochs to accommodate tenants that had been evicted from other parts of the parish and island. It was founded by former tenants of the farm of Kirkibost on the island of Bernera. They claimed that they had been forced to give up their lease at the insistence of the Seaforth Estate, and had moved to Achmore and nearby Lochganvich with the agreement of the said Estate and with the promise of a 14-year lease of these farms.

In the early 1830s, however, the Estate, having found a more profitable tenant or use for the land of these 1823 villages, began formal proceedings to evict the existing tenants, on the basis that they had no written lease. The other villages bowed to Estate pressure and disappeared, but Achmore seems to have been different.

Six of the tenants of that farm – John Maclennan Senior, John Macdonald Senior, John Mackenzie, Kenneth Maciver, Murdo Maciver and Finlay Maclean – fought their eviction notices through the courts, ending up in the Court of Session in Edinburgh in 1833. Their defence was that although they had not been given a formal written lease, their occupation of the lands had been verbally agreed by the Estate Factor; that they had their names recorded in the estate rental logs; and that they paid their rents in full to the estate over those previous nine years.

They also produced an estate document from 1823 which detailed how the farms of Achmore and Lochganvich should be lotted into 20 holdings together with a defined lot size of three acres, and rules by which the hill ground should operate in shared usage. It also suggested that 14 years would be the ordinary lease period. Ultimately, they were successful, and so they were allowed to stay.

== Early history ==
The remains of a fallen ancient stone circle lie close to the village. It was sited to link rare risings and settings of the moon and the sun with a hill range looking like a sleeping (and, only from the Achmore stone circle, pregnant) woman, called Cailleach na Mointeach (The Old Woman of the Moors). The circle was discovered in 1981 and measures 41 metres across. The circle was built around 3000 BC and probably consisted of 22 slabs up to two metres tall, two of which remain standing.
