= Steinish =

Coordinates: 58.220°N 6.347°W

Steinish: Scottish Gaelic: Steinnis
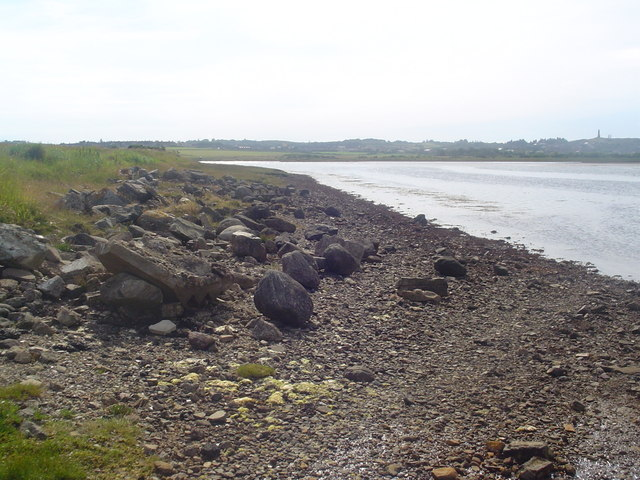
- The rocky shore viewed looking west from Steinish. The Tong Sands estuary is dangerous, with sinking sands and a strong tidal race.

- Location within the Outer Hebrides
- Language: Scottish Gaelic; English
- OS grid reference: NB447338
- Civil parish: Stornoway
- Council area: Na h-Eileanan Siar
- Lieutenancy area: Western Isles
- Country: Scotland
- Sovereign state: United Kingdom
- Post town: STORNOWAY
- Postcode district: HS1
- Dialling code: 01851
- Police: Scotland
- Fire: Scottish
- Ambulance: Scottish
- UK Parliament: Na h-Eileanan an Iar
- Scottish Parliament: Na h-Eileanan an Iar

Steinish (Scottish Gaelic: Steinnis, IPA:[ˈʃtʰʲeɲɪʃ]) is a village in the Scottish Outer Hebrides, on the Isle of Lewis, near Plasterfield and Stornoway Airport. Steinish is situated within the parish of Stornoway, and is also situated adjacent to the Laxdale estuary. A treasure trove was discovered in Steinish, in 1876, containing coins from the era of Francis and Mary, Mary, and James VI.

Wildlife in the area includes the Arctic tern, the corn crake, the blackpoll warbler and the knot, as well as a sighting of the cattle egret.
