= Keose =

Settlement in the civil parish of Lochs on the Isle of Lewis, Scotland

Coordinates: 58.10475°N 6.4839°W

Keose: Scottish Gaelic: Ceos
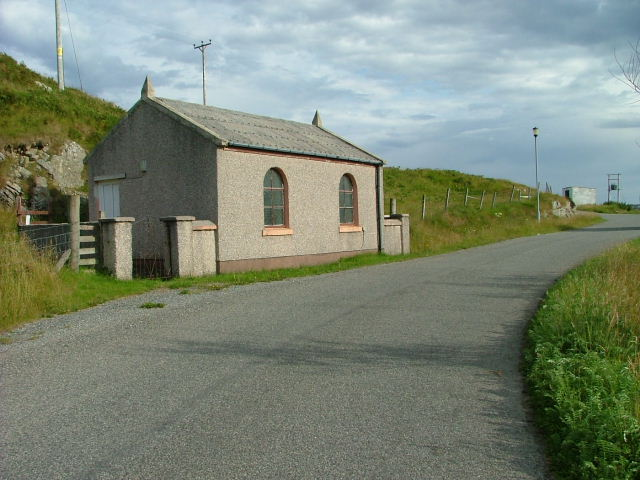
- Free Church of Scotland Meeting house, Keose

- Location within the Outer Hebrides
- Population: 106 (2011)
- Language: Scottish Gaelic Gaidhlig; English
- OS grid reference: NB371259
- Civil parish: Lochs
- Council area: Na h-Eileanan Siar
- Lieutenancy area: Western Isles
- Country: Scotland
- Sovereign state: United Kingdom
- Post town: ISLE OF LEWIS
- Postcode district: HS2
- Dialling code: 01851
- Police: Scotland
- Fire: Scottish
- Ambulance: Scottish
- UK Parliament: Na h-Eileanan an Iar
- Scottish Parliament: Na h-Eileanan an Iar

Keose is a settlement in the Kinloch community council area of the Western Isles, Scotland, in the civil parish of Lochs. It lies on the north shore of Loch Erisort. The old Parish Church, serving the parish of Lochs, was erected in 1830 on an island in Keose bay, but is now in ruins. The adjacent township of Keose Glebe was formerly the glebe of the manse of the parish church, but after 1929 it was split into crofts. Near Keose on the Swordale peninsula are ruins of what Is probably the first post-Reformation church in the parish of Lochs.

Keose, Gaelic spelling Ceòs, is derived from the word "Hollow" in Old Norse.

At the 2011 census, the population of Keose and Keose Glebe was 106.
