= Crossbost =

Coordinates: 58.134°N 6.439°W

Crossbost: Scottish Gaelic: Crosbost/Crosabost
- Location within the Outer Hebrides
- OS grid reference: NB395245
- Civil parish: Lochs
- Council area: Na h-Eileanan Siar
- Lieutenancy area: Western Isles
- Country: Scotland
- Sovereign state: United Kingdom
- Post town: STORNOWAY
- Postcode district: HS2 9NP
- Dialling code: 01851 860
- Police: Scotland
- Fire: Scottish
- Ambulance: Scottish
- UK Parliament: Na h-Eileanan an Iar
- Scottish Parliament: Na h-Eileanan an Iar

Crossbost is a village on the Isle of Lewis in the parish of North Lochs, in the Outer Hebrides, Scotland. It is located approximately ten miles away from Stornoway, the main town on the island. Due to its close proximity to the main island town there are very few local amenities. The village includes a Free Church of Scotland, graveyard, war memorial and an old fashioned, red telephone box (this no longer accepts coins; cards only). There are two piers in the village, both of which are regularly used, mainly for personal rather than business use.

The village of Crossbost was formed in the 1840s after the clearances of the people from Lemreway and other surrounding villages from the opposite side of Loch Erisort. Many of the families gathered the few possessions they could and came across the loch, most surviving their first winter in their upturned boats.
