= Gravir =

Coordinates: 58.052°N 6.449°W

Gravir: Scottish Gaelic: Grabhair
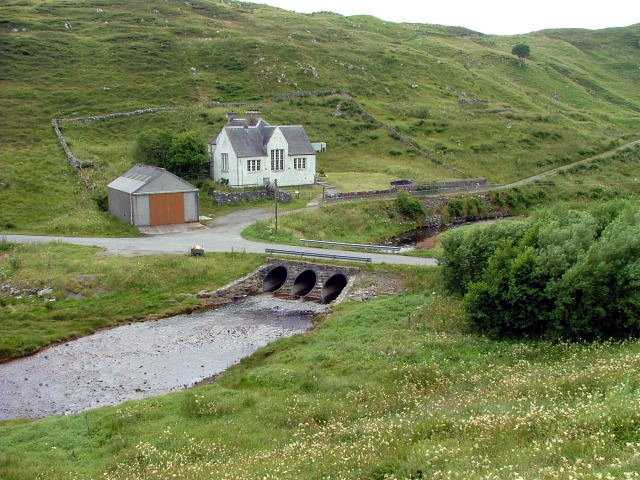
- Gravir folk museum

- Location within the Outer Hebrides
- Language: Scottish Gaelic; English
- OS grid reference: NB375156
- Civil parish: Lochs
- Council area: Na h-Eileanan Siar
- Lieutenancy area: Western Isles
- Country: Scotland
- Sovereign state: United Kingdom
- Post town: ISLE OF LEWIS
- Postcode district: HS2
- Dialling code: 01851
- Police: Scotland
- Fire: Scottish
- Ambulance: Scottish
- UK Parliament: Na h-Eileanan an Iar
- Scottish Parliament: Na h-Eileanan an Iar

Gravir (Scottish Gaelic: Grabhair), is a village on the shore of Loch Odhairn (a sea loch) in the Park district of the Isle of Lewis. Gravir is within the parish of Lochs. There is a Free Church, a school and a voluntary fire station in the village. There is also a pier. Most of the plots of land used to be used for crofting, but this has declined in the last 50 years. The road leading to the village is the B8060, and continues on to Orinsay and Lemreway.

== Economy ==
Gravir Pier is primarily used by fish farming vessels but is also used by small fishing and leisure craft. The fish farm located in Loch Odhairn is operated by Bakkafrost.

In March 2007, Scottish and Southern Energy proposed to build a converter station above the village and to use Gravir as the Western Isles landfall for a sub-sea interconnector cable, to export electricity generated from two proposed large scale windfarms at Eishken and Pairc across the Minch to mainland markets. The cable would run north of the Shiant bank and land at Little Lochbroom. On the Lewis side, it would enter the mouth of Loch Odhairn at the fish farm and run up the length of the sealoch under the shore at its head, by the old schoolhouse, and then be buried across crofts to the hilltop to the converter station. One network of overhead lines or pylons would run to the planned Pairc windfarm and to Eishken. Another run of overhead lines on wooden poles would leave Gravir by following the village road heading for the sub-station by the River Creed.
