= Marybank =

Coordinates: 57.547°N 4.540°W

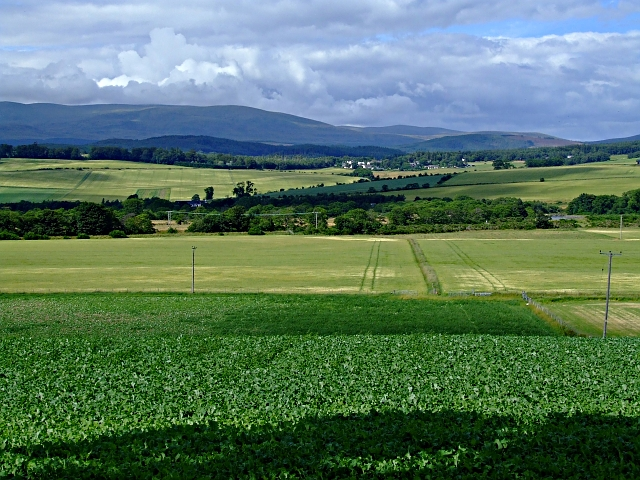
- A view next to the village

- Location within the Ross and Cromarty area
- OS grid reference: NH486534
- Council area: Highland
- Country: Scotland
- Sovereign state: United Kingdom
- Post town: Muir of Ord
- Postcode district: IV6 7
- Dialling code: 01997
- Police: Scotland
- Fire: Scottish
- Ambulance: Scottish

Marybank is a small village in Ross-shire, Scottish Highlands and is in the Scottish council area of Highland. The village of Muir of Ord lies 3 miles (4.8 km) south east of Marybank, along the A832 road. The village of Contin lies less than 2 miles (3.2 km) north-west of Marybank.

== Cycle race ==
The Strathconon Cycle ride happens every year on the first Saturday in May. This ride consists of a 19-mile ride from the top of Strathconon finishing in Marybank, a 38-mile "there and back" ride, and a 4 miler for younger kids. This event raises money for Marybank's Hall Committee.
