= Airidh a' Bhruaich =

Township on the Isle of Lewis

Coordinates: 58.06068°N 6.67259°W

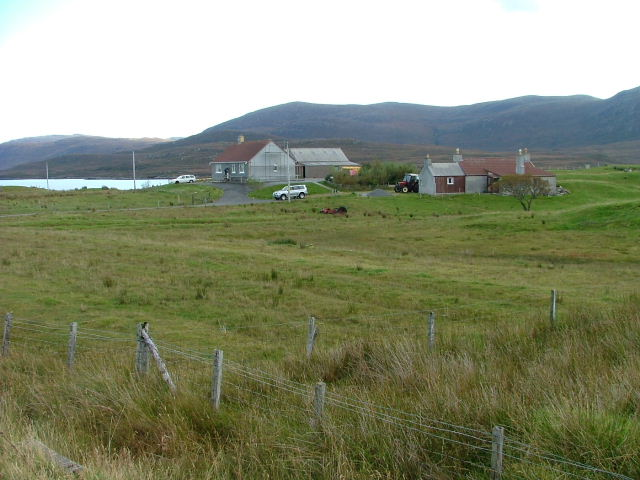
landholding system

Airidh a' Bhruaich (Arivruaich - anglicised) is a scattered crofting township in the South Lochs district of the Isle of Lewis in the Outer Hebrides of Scotland. It lies at the head of the sea loch of Loch Seaforth.
