= Baile an Truiseil =

Village on the Isle of Lewis, Scotland

Coordinates: 58.392°N 6.485°W

Ballantrushal: Scottish Gaelic: Baile an Truiseil
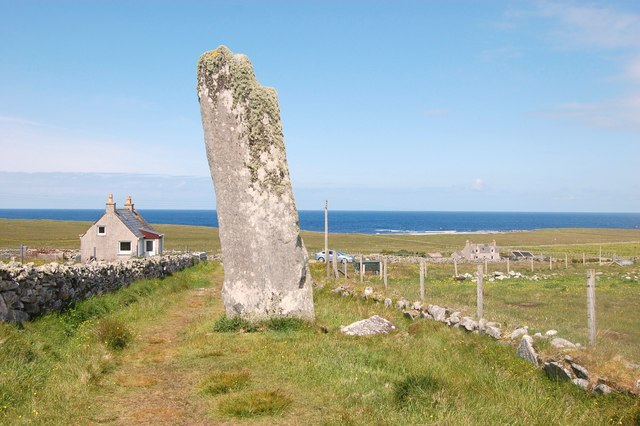
- The Clach an Trushal at Ballantrushal

- Location within the Outer Hebrides
- Language: Scottish Gaelic; English
- OS grid reference: NB379535
- Civil parish: Barvas
- Council area: Na h-Eileanan Siar
- Lieutenancy area: Western Isles
- Country: Scotland
- Sovereign state: United Kingdom
- Post town: ISLE OF LEWIS
- Postcode district: HS2
- Dialling code: 01851
- Police: Scotland
- Fire: Scottish
- Ambulance: Scottish
- UK Parliament: Na h-Eileanan an Iar
- Scottish Parliament: Na h-Eileanan an Iar

Ballantrushal (Scottish Gaelic: Baile an Truiseil) is a village on the Isle of Lewis in the West Side district, in the Outer Hebrides, Scotland. Ballantrushal is within the parish of Barvas, and is situated on the A857. The standing stone Clach an Trushal is beside the village. and was the site of the last battle between the Lewis Macaulays and Morrison clans.
