= Cliff, Lewis =

Settlement in the Outer Hebrides, Scotland

Coordinates: 58.215°N 6.969°W

Cliff: Scottish Gaelic: Cliobh
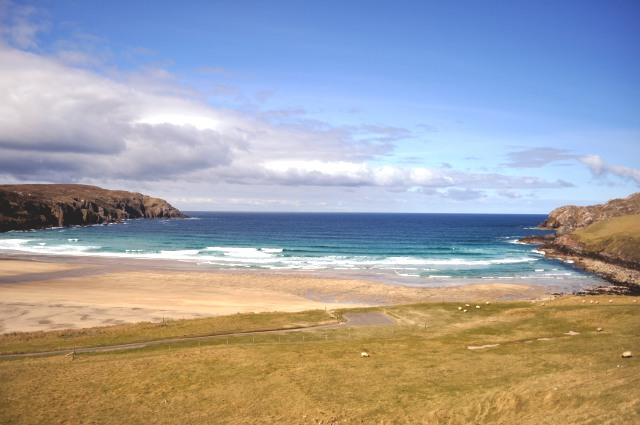
- Traigh na Clibhe, just north of the settlement

- Location within the Outer Hebrides
- Language: Scottish Gaelic; English
- OS grid reference: NB082358
- Civil parish: Uig
- Council area: Na h-Eileanan Siar
- Lieutenancy area: Western Isles
- Country: Scotland
- Sovereign state: United Kingdom
- Post town: STORNOWAY
- Postcode district: HS2
- Dialling code: 01851
- Police: Scotland
- Fire: Scottish
- Ambulance: Scottish
- UK Parliament: Na h-Eileanan an Iar
- Scottish Parliament: Na h-Eileanan an Iar

Cliff (Scottish Gaelic: Cliobh) is a small settlement on the Isle of Lewis, in the Outer Hebrides, Scotland. Cliff is within the parish of Uig. The settlement is situated on a minor road, off the B8011. The picturesque beach is unsafe for swimming. At low to mid tide holds an excellent barrelling beach break wave. Breaks up to 12 feet (3.7 metres) for experienced surfers and bodyboarders
