= Marybank, Lewis =

Coordinates: 58.218°N 6.418°W

Marybank: Scottish Gaelic: Bruach Màiri
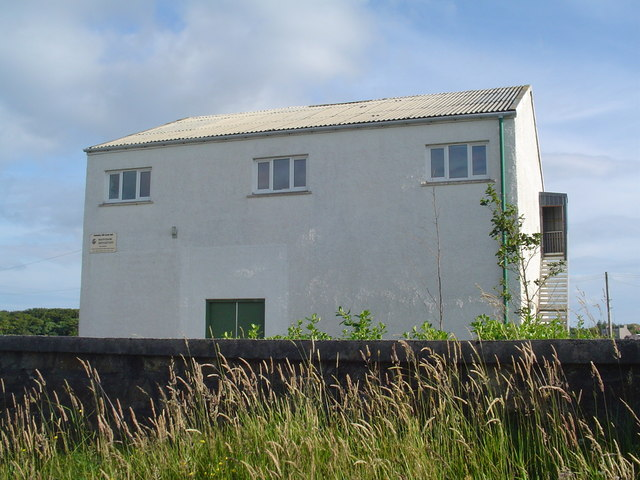
- The Marybank Depository

- Location within the Outer Hebrides
- Language: Scottish Gaelic; English
- OS grid reference: NB405339
- Civil parish: Stornoway
- Council area: Na h-Eileanan Siar
- Lieutenancy area: Western Isles
- Country: Scotland
- Sovereign state: United Kingdom
- Post town: ISLE OF LEWIS
- Postcode district: HS2
- Dialling code: 01851
- Police: Scotland
- Fire: Scottish
- Ambulance: Scottish
- UK Parliament: Na h-Eileanan an Iar
- Scottish Parliament: Na h-Eileanan an Iar

Marybank (Scottish Gaelic: Bruach Màiri [ˈpɾuəxˈmaːɾʲɪ]) is a settlement on the outskirts of Stornoway, Isle of Lewis in the Outer Hebrides of Scotland. It is also within the parish of Stornoway. Marybank is situated at the junction of the A858 and A859. Lews Castle and Stornoway Golf Club are to the east of Marybank.
