= Newvalley, Lewis =

Coordinates: 58.229°N 6.407°W

Newvalley: Scottish Gaelic: An Gleann Ùr
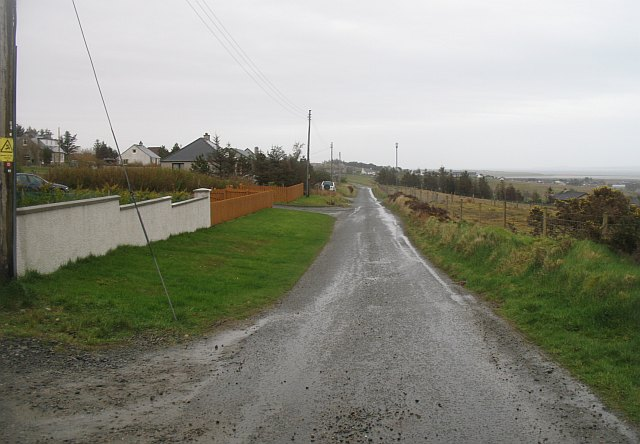
- An Gleann Ur, road serving houses built along a ridge

- Location within the Outer Hebrides
- Language: Scottish Gaelic; English
- OS grid reference: NB413351
- Civil parish: Stornoway
- Council area: Na h-Eileanan Siar
- Lieutenancy area: Western Isles
- Country: Scotland
- Sovereign state: United Kingdom
- Post town: ISLE OF LEWIS
- Postcode district: HS2
- Dialling code: 01851
- Police: Scotland
- Fire: Scottish
- Ambulance: Scottish
- UK Parliament: Na h-Eileanan an Iar
- Scottish Parliament: Na h-Eileanan an Iar

Newvalley (Scottish Gaelic: An Gleann Ùr) is a hamlet on the Isle of Lewis in the Outer Hebrides, Scotland. Newvalley is within the parish of Stornoway. The remains of the Priest's Glen stone circle are located the north of the settlement.
