= Newmarket, Lewis =

Coordinates: 58.233°N 6.390°W

Newmarket: Scottish Gaelic: An Margaidh Ùr
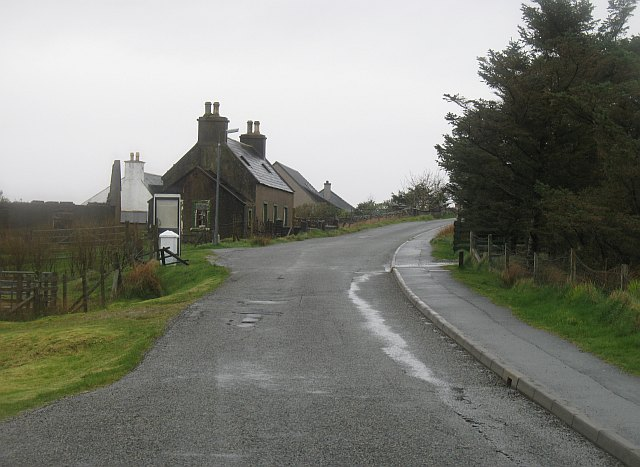
- Benside, in Newmarket

- Location within the Outer Hebrides
- Population: 1,610 (2020)
- Language: Scottish Gaelic; English
- OS grid reference: NB423355
- Civil parish: Stornoway
- Council area: Na h-Eileanan Siar
- Lieutenancy area: Western Isles
- Country: Scotland
- Sovereign state: United Kingdom
- Post town: ISLE OF LEWIS
- Postcode district: HS2
- Dialling code: 01851 70
- Police: Scotland
- Fire: Scottish
- Ambulance: Scottish
- UK Parliament: Na h-Eileanan an Iar
- Scottish Parliament: Na h-Eileanan an Iar

Newmarket (/njuːˈmɑːrkɪt/ new-MAR-kit; Scottish Gaelic: An Margaidh Ùr [ən̪ˠ ˈmaɾakaj ˈuːɾ]) is a village in the Outer Hebrides of Scotland, on the Isle of Lewis near Stornoway. It is part of the Leodsoch countryside and a peat site is not far away. Its nearest town is Stornoway and the nearest council headquarters is Na h-Eileanan Siar in Stornoway. Newmarket is within the parish of Stornoway. Newmarket is situated on the A857 at the junction with the B895. The remains of a stone circle exist to the west of the villages in a croft.

== Peat site ==
The peat site is situated just at the border of the village of Laxdale.

== Neighbouring villages ==
Neighbouring villages are: Laxdale (Lacasdail), Gress (Griais) and Tong (Thunga).
