= Sandwick, Lewis =

Coordinates: 58.206°N 6.355°W

Sandwick: Scottish Gaelic: Sanndabhaig
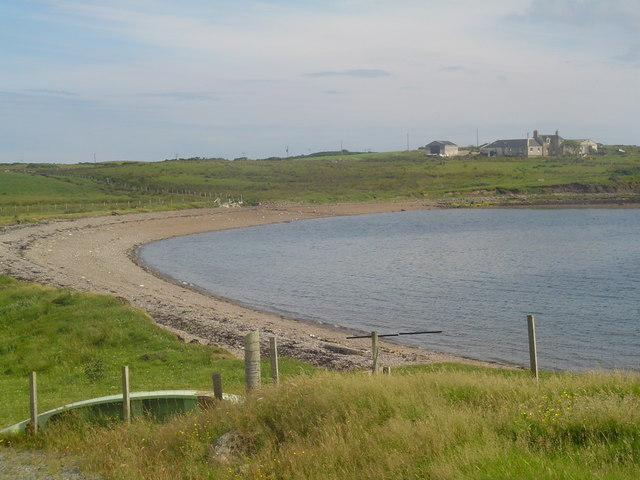
- Shingle Beach, Sandwick

- Location within the Outer Hebrides
- Population: 870 (2020)
- Language: Scottish Gaelic; English
- OS grid reference: NB441323
- Civil parish: Stornoway
- Council area: Na h-Eileanan Siar
- Lieutenancy area: Western Isles
- Country: Scotland
- Sovereign state: United Kingdom
- Post town: STORNOWAY
- Postcode district: HS1
- Dialling code: 01851
- Police: Scotland
- Fire: Scottish
- Ambulance: Scottish
- UK Parliament: Na h-Eileanan an Iar
- Scottish Parliament: Na h-Eileanan an Iar

Sandwick (Scottish Gaelic: Sanndabhaig, IPA:[ˈs̪aun̴̪t̪əvɪkʲ]) is a village in the Scottish Outer Hebrides, on the Isle of Lewis and a quasi-suburb of Stornoway. Sandwick is situated within the parish of Stornoway.

== Education ==
Sandwick is home to one of the three principal primary schools for the Stornoway area, Sandwickhill School.

== See also ==
- Lewis and Harris
- History of the Outer Hebrides
