= Park, Lewis =

Area in Lewis, Scotland

Coordinates: 58°0′N 6°34′W

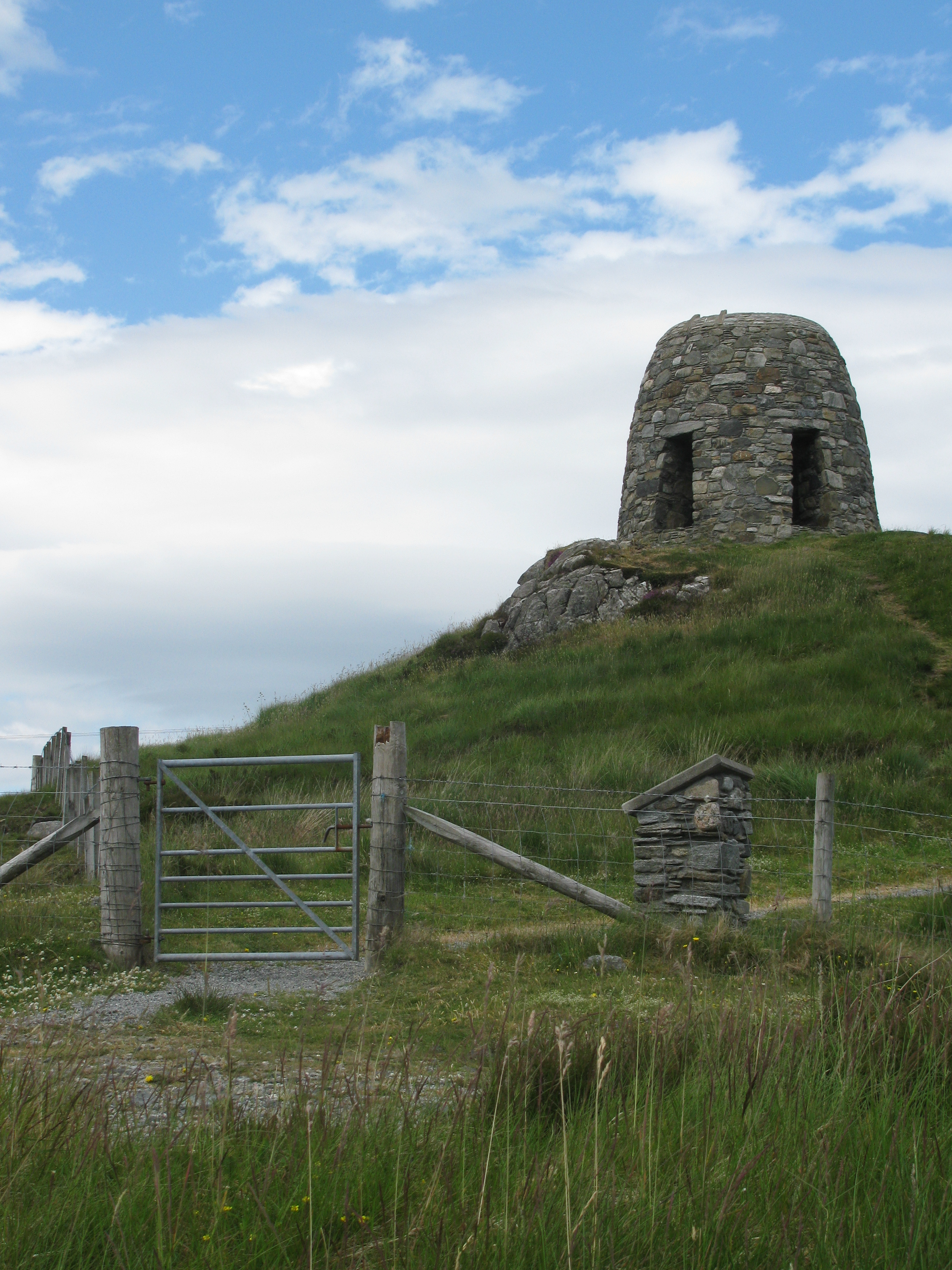
Monument to the Deer Raiders, Park

Park (Scottish Gaelic: A' Phàirc), also known as South Lochs, is a huge area of land connected to the rest of Lewis only by a narrow neck between Loch Seaforth and Loch Erisort. This had a wall called Gàrradh an Tighearna ("The Laird's Dyke") built across it by the Earl of Seaforth in the early 17th century, the outline of which can still be seen.

Only the north of Park is now inhabited: settlements in the south were cleared by Sir James Matheson in the nineteenth century. A famous deer raid took place here in 1887 as a demonstration by starving people, commemorated by a broch resembling a cairn at the Eishken junction. Much of this area is still used for deer stalking.

== Community buyout ==
The Pairc Estate extends to 10,845 hectares (26,800 acres) and includes 11 crofting townships with a combined population of nearly 400. In 2011 the Pairc Community Trust received approval from Roseanna Cunningham, the Environment Minister, for a bid to buy the estate under the crofting "Right to Buy" provisions of the Land Reform (Scotland) Act 2003. Pairc Trust chairman Angus McDowall, said: "This is an historic step forward for our community, and sends an unambiguous message to the landlord that the economic and social development of Pairc in the interests of the whole community should be ranked above private financial gain. It is a complete vindication of the persistence which we and the whole community have shown over so many years in trying to exercise our rights under the Act in order to plan a better future for local crofters and residents." In late 2013, an agreement was reached with the laird, Barry Lomas, for the sale of 26,775 acres (10,835 ha) at a price of £500,000. In May 2014 the community voted to proceed with the buyout, with 166 voting for and 77 against. In December 2015, the community trust formally gained possession of the land.

The Pairc Trust now owns and manages the estate from its resource centre at Kershader, South Lochs. Its aims are to develop and enhance local housing, employment, and infrastructure, and to reverse generations of population decline.

== Crofting townships in Park ==
- Orinsay
- Lemreway
- Gravir
- Garyvard
- Kershader
- Habost
- Caversta
- Marvig
- Calbost
- Eishken
- Shiltenish
- Torastay
- Cromore

== Natural environment ==
Loch Cromore, which has a slight salt water content, is good for wildfowl, including wintering whooper swans and common seals frequent the inlets. The deserted village of Stiomrabhagh is a short walk from Orinsay. Fine views of the Shiant Islands may be obtained from Lemreway and Orinsay.
