= Branahuie =

Coordinates: 58.206°N 6.309°W

Branahuie: Scottish Gaelic: Bràigh na h-Aoidhe
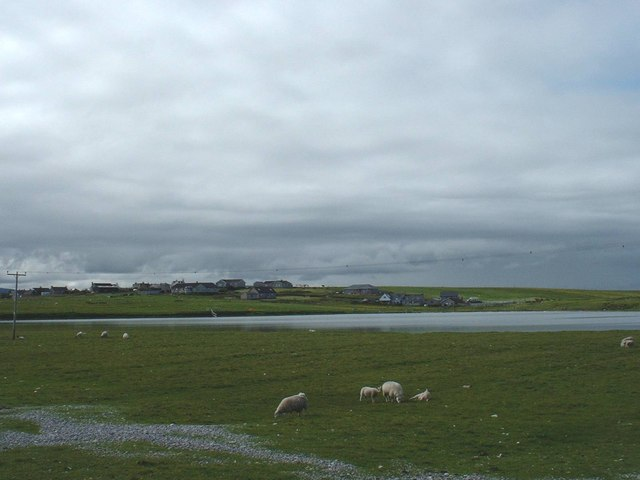
- Loch Bràigh na h-Aoidhe, looking towards Melbost

- Location within the Outer Hebrides
- Language: Scottish Gaelic; English
- OS grid reference: NB468321
- Civil parish: Stornoway
- Council area: Na h-Eileanan Siar
- Lieutenancy area: Western Isles
- Country: Scotland
- Sovereign state: United Kingdom
- Post town: ISLE OF LEWIS
- Postcode district: HS2
- Dialling code: 01851
- Police: Scotland
- Fire: Scottish
- Ambulance: Scottish
- UK Parliament: Na h-Eileanan an Iar
- Scottish Parliament: Na h-Eileanan an Iar

Branahuie (Scottish Gaelic: Bràigh na h-Aoidhe) is a village on the Isle of Lewis in the Outer Hebrides, Scotland. Branahuie is within the parish of Stornoway, and is situated on the A866. It is also close to Stornoway, Stornoway Airport and Melbost.
