= Brue =

Coordinates: 58.354°N 6.549°W

Brue: Scottish Gaelic: Brù
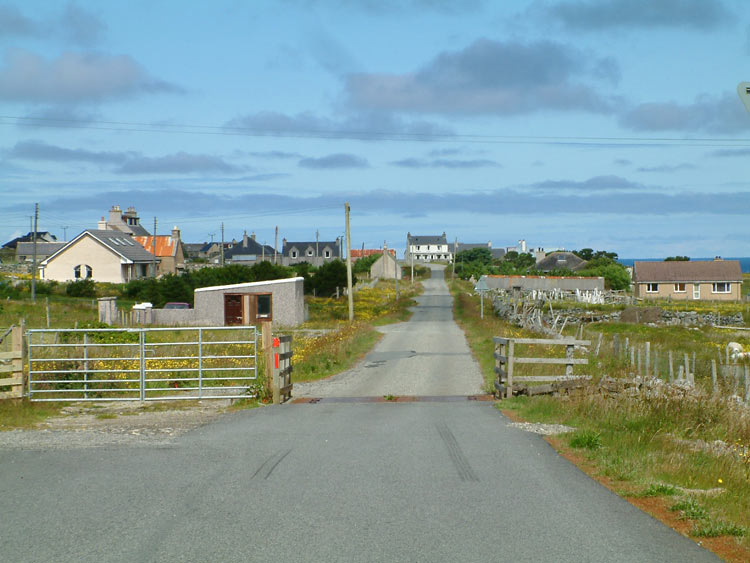
- A view into Brue from the end of the village

- Location within the Outer Hebrides
- Language: Scottish Gaelic; English
- OS grid reference: NB339495
- Civil parish: Barvas
- Council area: Na h-Eileanan Siar
- Lieutenancy area: Western Isles
- Country: Scotland
- Sovereign state: United Kingdom
- Post town: ISLE OF LEWIS
- Postcode district: HS2
- Dialling code: 01851
- Police: Scotland
- Fire: Scottish
- Ambulance: Scottish
- UK Parliament: Na h-Eileanan an Iar
- Scottish Parliament: Na h-Eileanan an Iar

Brue (Scottish Gaelic: Brù) is a village on the Isle of Lewis in the West Side district, in the Outer Hebrides, Scotland. It is a crofting township and it is composed of two areas: Am Baile Staigh, which is nearer the coast, and Pàirc Bhrù, which runs towards the moor. In total it covers a road distance of 2.5 km. Brue is situated on a minor road which joins to the A858, and is within the parish of Barvas.

The name Brue is an anglicised form of the Scottish Gaelic Brù which in turn comes from an Old Norse word which is believed to have meant bridge; this reflects the centuries of Norsemen occupation and settlement in the Outer Hebrides.

The coastline at Brue is the site of various cairns, including a prehistoric one, and is also near to the site of a blackhouse.
