= South Galson =

Coordinates: 58.444°N 6.394°W

South Galson: Scottish Gaelic: Gàbhsann bho Dheas
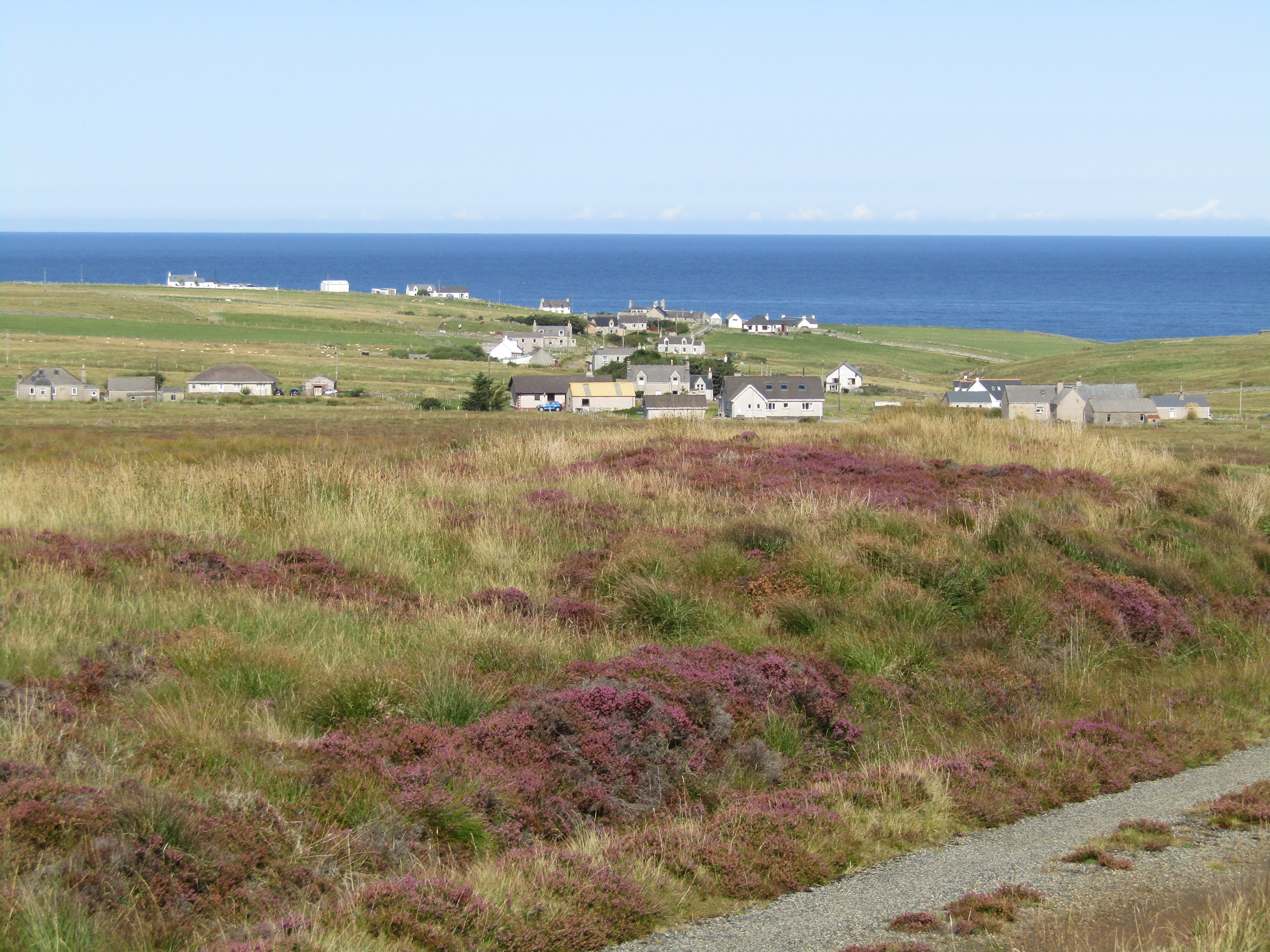
- View of South Galson

- Location within the Outer Hebrides
- Language: Scottish Gaelic; English
- Civil parish: Ness
- Council area: Na h-Eileanan Siar
- Lieutenancy area: Western Isles
- Country: Scotland
- Sovereign state: United Kingdom
- Post town: ISLE OF LEWIS
- Postcode district: HS
- Dialling code: 01851
- Police: Scotland
- Fire: Scottish
- Ambulance: Scottish
- UK Parliament: Na h-Eileanan an Iar
- Scottish Parliament: Na h-Eileanan an Iar

South Galson is a settlement on the northwest coast of the Isle of Lewis in the Western Isles of Scotland. It is 11 kilometres (6.8 mi) southwest of Port of Ness. The Galson Primary School closed in 1996. The populations of North Galson, South Galson, and Melbost were 149 in 1999.

== History ==
The village was a crofting village until 1863, after which the inhabitants of North Galson, South Galson and Melbost Galson were cleared to make way for a new farm.

The farm was occupied by tenants until 1921, when crofters began to lobby for land reform. The crofters had been promised land in return for fighting in the First World War, but that promise was not kept. As a result of this broken promise a number of ex-soldiers and others began to raid the Galson Farm and to campaign for the farm to be broken up into new crofts. In 1923, the government divided the farm into 53 crofts. All the buildings in Galson, except for the farmhouse and its steadings, have been built since 1923.

Eventually, in 2007, after a community buyout, the land was handed over to Galson Estate Trust.

== Urras Oighreachd Ghabhsainn / Galson Estate Trust ==
Urras Oighreachd Ghabhsainn was established in 2007 to manage the Galson Estate on behalf of the community. The 56,000-acre estate comprises 22 villages running from Upper Barvas to Port of Ness with a population of nearly 2,000 people. The development of the wind turbines at Ballantrushal and commercial developments provide the trust with an income stream. The trust's headquarters is located in South Galson. In 2019 the building caught fire. A new headquarters was under construction in 2021.

== Teampall a’ Chrò’ Naomh ==
Teampall a’ Chrò’ Naomh (Chapel of the Holy Cross) is a church situated in South Galson old cemetery. William Daniell drew and engraved the chapel in 1819, showing the building roofless with four walls intact and one of the two gables full height, but it is now a much reduced ruin. The site is a scheduled monument.
