= Cromore =

Coordinates: 58.103°N 6.414°W

Cromore: Scottish Gaelic: Crò Mòr
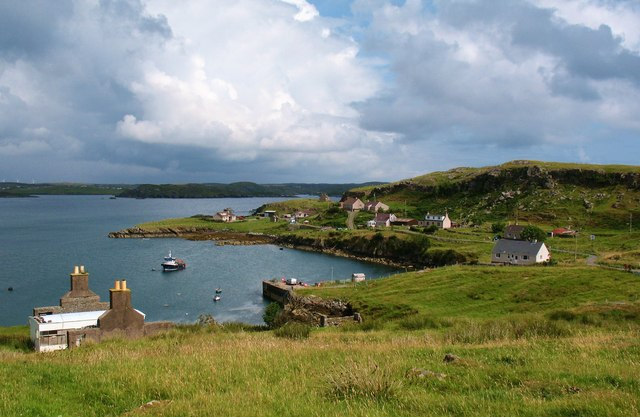
- Looking down on the sheltered natural harbour at Cromor

- Location within the Outer Hebrides
- Language: Scottish Gaelic; English
- OS grid reference: NB399211
- Civil parish: Lochs
- Council area: Na h-Eileanan Siar
- Lieutenancy area: Western Isles
- Country: Scotland
- Sovereign state: United Kingdom
- Post town: ISLE OF LEWIS
- Postcode district: HS2
- Dialling code: 01851
- Police: Scotland
- Fire: Scottish
- Ambulance: Scottish
- UK Parliament: Na h-Eileanan an Iar
- Scottish Parliament: Na h-Eileanan an Iar

Cromore (Scottish Gaelic: Crò Mòr) is a crofting township on the Isle of Lewis in the district of Pairc, in the Outer Hebrides, Scotland. The settlement is within the parish of Lochs. Cromore is about 27 miles away by road from Stornoway, the nearest town.

Cromore is an active crofting township close to one of Scotland's National Scenic Areas. Its wild and unspoiled beauty make it a draw for tourists. Some of the former croft houses are now in use as holiday cottages.

Notable figures from Cromore include actor and writer Kenny Boyle and Coinneach MacLeod The Hebridean Baker.
