= Calbost =

Village on the Isle of Lewis in Scotland

Coordinates: 58.069°N 06.388°W

Calbost: Scottish Gaelic: Calabost
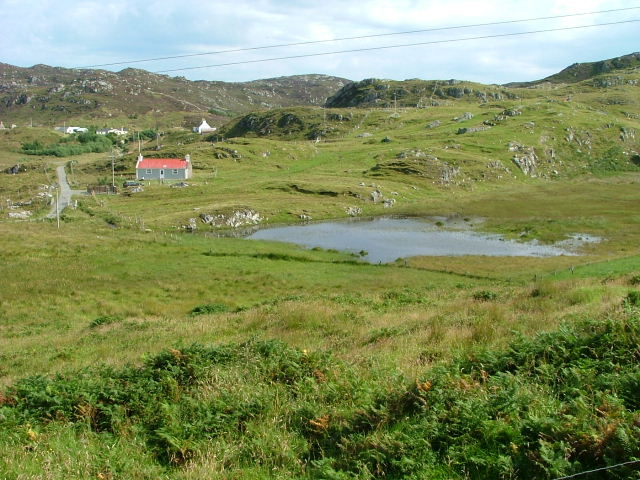
- Lochan and houses at the south of Calbost

- Location within the Outer Hebrides
- Language: Scottish Gaelic; English
- OS grid reference: NB412172
- Civil parish: Lochs
- Council area: Na h-Eileanan Siar
- Lieutenancy area: Western Isles
- Country: Scotland
- Sovereign state: United Kingdom
- Post town: ISLE OF LEWIS
- Postcode district: HS2
- Dialling code: 01851
- Police: Scotland
- Fire: Scottish
- Ambulance: Scottish
- UK Parliament: Na h-Eileanan an Iar
- Scottish Parliament: Na h-Eileanan an Iar

Calbost (Scottish Gaelic: Calabost) is a village on the Isle of Lewis in the Outer Hebrides, Scotland. Calbost is within the parish of Lochs, and within the district of Pairc.

Calbost is known for its pretty scenery and lively fishing scene.

On November 16, 1939, the British merchant ship S.S. Arlington Court was torpedoed and sunk in the Atlantic Ocean by the crew of the German submarine U-43. In his Scottish Gaelic language poem Calum Moireasdan an Arlington Court ("Calum Morrison of the Arlington Court"), North Uist war poet Dòmhnall Ruadh Chorùna paid tribute to the courage shown by one of the survivors, a seventeen year old merchant seaman from Calbost. Calum Morrison had been the only survivor in his lifeboat who had known how to sail and had managed to pilot their lifeboat eastwards for five days, until he and his fellow survivors were rescued at the mouth of the English Channel.

The Angus Macleod Archive, which contains much historical writing, photographs and recordings of the village and the South Lochs area, was originally kept at a museum in Calbost, and is now kept in Kershader. Many of the artefacts from the museum are now in the keeping of the Museum nan Eilean in Stornoway.
