= West Side, Lewis =

Coordinates: 58°20′57″N 6°31′11″W

The West Side (Scottish Gaelic: An Taobh Siar) is the name used for the (predominantly Gaelic-speaking) settlements along the NW coast of the Isle of Lewis between Dell in Ness to the NE and Shawbost to the SW.

The area is about 25 km long and is served by the A857 and A858 roads.

The settlements on the West Side are: (from the NE) Galson/Gabhsann, Melbost/Mealabost, Borve/Buirgh, Shader/Siadar, Barvas/Barabhas, Brue/Brù, Arnol/Àrnoil, Bragar/Bhràdhagair, and Shawbost/Siabost.
