= Habost =

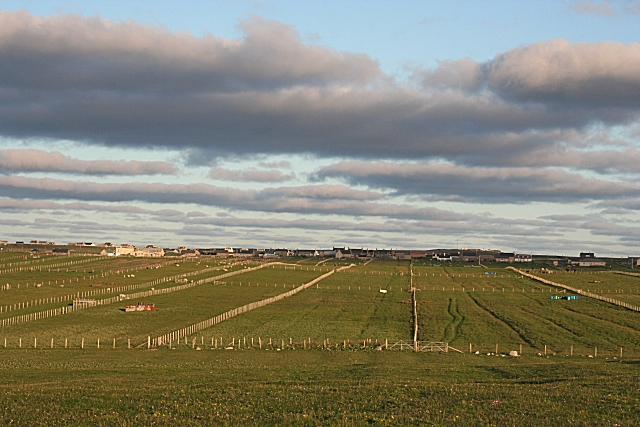
An example of the strip pattern of the croft fences seen in Habost

Habost (Scottish Gaelic: Tàbost) is the name of two crofting townships on the Isle of Lewis in the Outer Hebrides of Scotland.

One is in the Ness area at the northern tip of the island at grid reference NB519629 and is home to an arts and music centre. It is a traditional area of the Clan Morrison.

The other is in the district of Lochs and lies on the shore of Loch Erisort at grid reference NB325195.
