= Sheriff of Dingwall =

Sheriff post in Scotland

The Sheriff of Dingwall was historically the office responsible for enforcing law and order in Dingwall, Scotland and bringing criminals to justice. Dingwall was granted royal burgh status in 1226 by King Alexander II of Scotland. The seat of the sheriffdom from 1265 was Dingwall Castle.

== Sheriffs of Dingwall ==
- Alexander Comyn (1264–1266)
