= Kilmuir, Black Isle =

Coordinates: 57.518234°N 4.221854°W

Kilmuir: Scottish Gaelic: Cille Mhoire
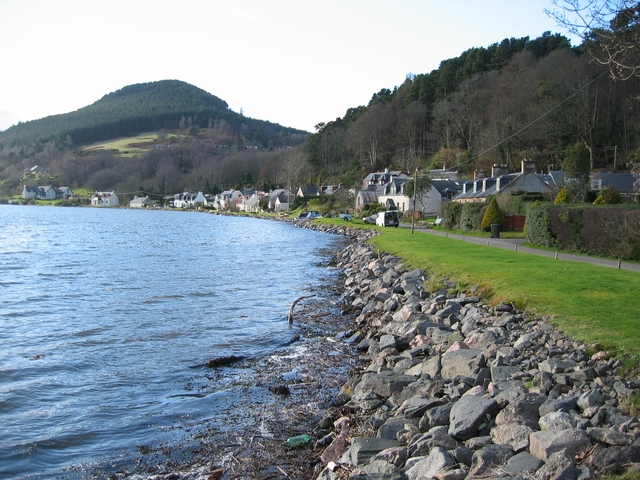

- Location within the Ross and Cromarty area
- OS grid reference: NH670497
- Council area: Highland
- Country: Scotland
- Sovereign state: United Kingdom
- Post town: Inverness
- Postcode district: IV1 3
- Police: Scotland
- Fire: Scottish
- Ambulance: Scottish
- UK Parliament: Ross, Skye and Lochaber
- Scottish Parliament: Skye, Lochaber and Badenoch

Kilmuir (from the Scottish Gaelic Cille Mhoire, meaning Mary's Church) is a former fishing village, located on the north coast of the Moray Firth in the Black Isle and is in the Scottish council area of Highland. Kilmuir is located 2 1/2 miles (4 km) northeast of Inverness.
