= North Lochs =

Area in eastern Lewis, Outer Hebrides, Scotland

Coordinates: 58°8′30″N 6°26′58″W

North Lochs, (Scottish Gaelic: Ceann a Tuath nan Loch), an area in eastern Lewis, Outer Hebrides, Scotland, is named for the many lochans (small lochs) which dot the landscape. Because of its largely undulating and rocky terrain, it is sparsely populated apart from flat ground near the coast. Its communities support traditional crofting and fishing.

North Lochs life is centred on the twin villages of Leurbost and Crossbost.

According to the 2011 Census, there are 942 Gaelic speakers (53%) in the Lochs area.
