= Balallan =

Coordinates: 58.092°N 6.607°W

Balallan: Scottish Gaelic: Baile Ailein
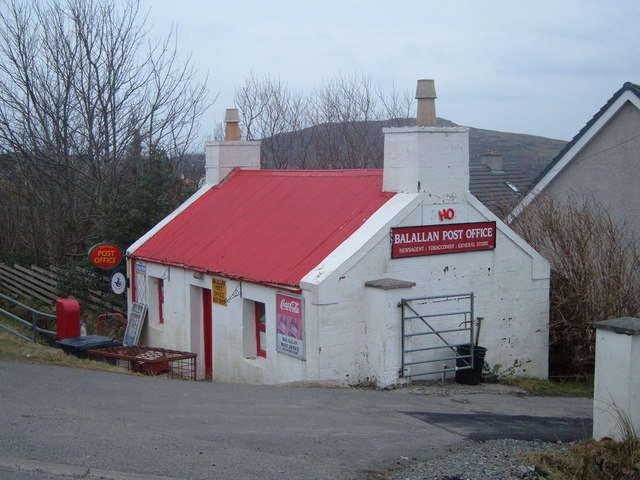
- Balallan Post Office

- Location within the Outer Hebrides
- Language: Scottish Gaelic; English
- OS grid reference: NB285206
- Civil parish: Lochs
- Council area: Na h-Eileanan Siar
- Lieutenancy area: Western Isles
- Country: Scotland
- Sovereign state: United Kingdom
- Post town: ISLE OF LEWIS
- Postcode district: HS2
- Dialling code: 01851
- Police: Scotland
- Fire: Scottish
- Ambulance: Scottish
- UK Parliament: Na h-Eileanan an Iar
- Scottish Parliament: Na h-Eileanan an Iar

Balallan (Scottish Gaelic: Baile Ailein, Bail' Ailein), meaning "Allan's Town", is a crofting township on the Isle of Lewis, in the Outer Hebrides, Scotland. Balallan is within the parish of Lochs.

The township has the distinction of being the longest village (4 miles or 6 kilometres from end to end) in Lewis, and also in northern Scotland. Straggled along the head of a long sea loch between Arivruach and Laxay, it developed due to a mixture of crofting along the loch shore and fishing. It sits at the head of Loch Erisort.

Those on the loch side were each given direct access to the loch for their boats as well as access to the moorland behind for their sheep. They also attended to their croft, given relative shelter from the elements by the high ground to the west.

The village formerly had a police house, and currently houses a post office.

Just south of the village there is a cairn that stands as a memorial to the Deer Park Raiders. It is one of three Land Struggle cairns to have been commissioned on the Isle of Lewis.

Celtic goalkeeper Rachael Johnstone was brought up in Balallan.

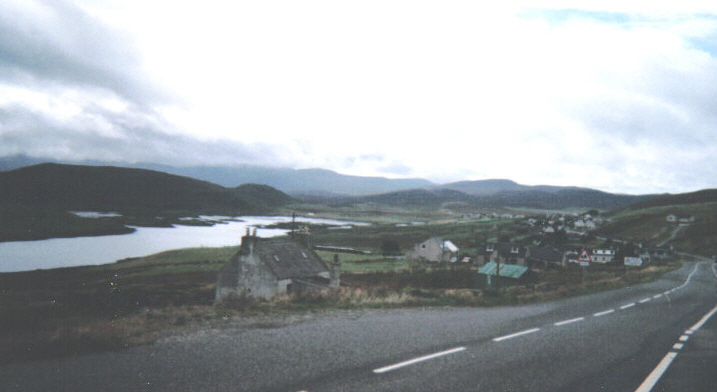
