= Orinsay =

Coordinates: 58.0142°N 6.46080138°W

Orinsay: Scottish Gaelic: Orasaigh
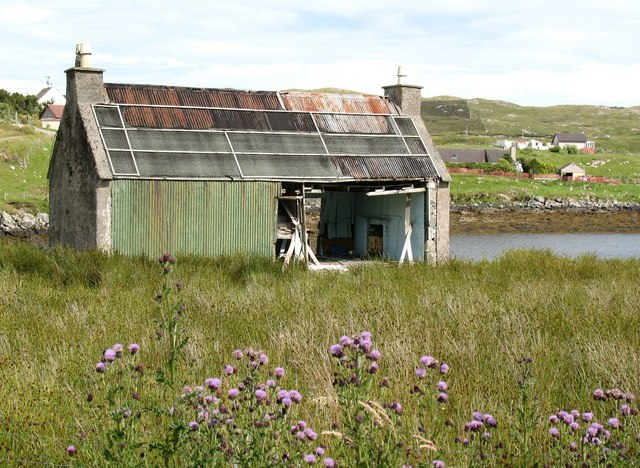

- Location within the Outer Hebrides
- Language: Scottish Gaelic; English
- OS grid reference: NB 3663 1148
- Civil parish: Lochs
- Council area: Na h-Eileanan Siar
- Lieutenancy area: Western Isles
- Country: Scotland
- Sovereign state: United Kingdom
- Post town: ISLE OF LEWIS
- Postcode district: HS2
- Police: Scotland
- Fire: Scottish
- Ambulance: Scottish
- UK Parliament: Na h-Eileanan an Iar
- Scottish Parliament: Na h-Eileanan an Iar

Orinsay (Scottish Gaelic: Orasaigh) is a crofting village on the Isle of Lewis in the district of Pairc, in the Outer Hebrides, Scotland. The settlement is within the parish of Lochs. Orinsay is 30 miles (50 kilometres) from Stornoway, the major town of the Isle of Lewis, by Road. It is the birthplace of folk singer Calum Kennedy.
