= Plasterfield =

Coordinates: 58.212°N 6.358°W

Plasterfield: Scottish Gaelic: Raon na Crèadha
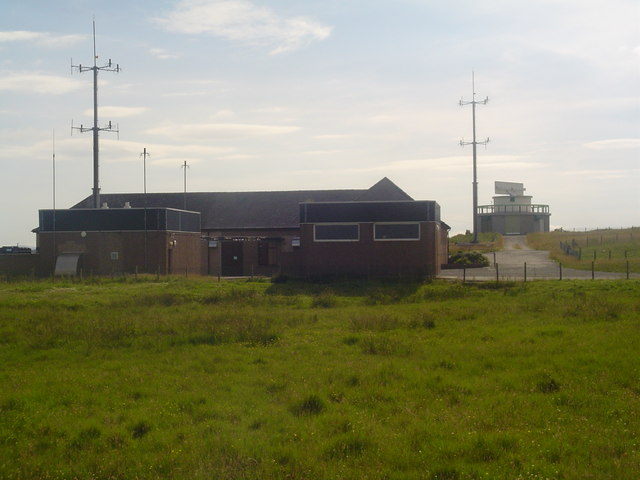
- Stornoway radar station, which helps controllers at Prestwick monitor transatlantic and other high-level air traffic, at the south-eastern corner of Plasterfield

- Location within the Outer Hebrides
- Language: Scottish Gaelic; English
- OS grid reference: NB440330
- Civil parish: Stornoway
- Council area: Na h-Eileanan Siar
- Lieutenancy area: Western Isles
- Country: Scotland
- Sovereign state: United Kingdom
- Post town: STORNOWAY
- Postcode district: HS1
- Dialling code: 01851
- Police: Scotland
- Fire: Scottish
- Ambulance: Scottish
- UK Parliament: Na h-Eileanan an Iar
- Scottish Parliament: Na h-Eileanan an Iar

Plasterfield (Scottish Gaelic: Raon na Crèadha) is a hamlet in the Scottish Outer Hebrides, on the Isle of Lewis. Plasterfield is within the parish of Stornoway.

Plasterfield is a suburb of Stornoway and consists of two groups of houses, built after World War II. The ambulance station for the Isle of Lewis is also here as well a small industrial estate (Mossend estate). In the 1970s a group of Barratt houses was built adjacent to Plasterfield; this area was originally called Bayview. Plasterfield is also the home of The Blackhouse bakery (formerly MacKinnon's).

Angus Macleod, the former Scottish editor of The Times, was raised in Plasterfield.
