= Loch Erisort =

Sea inlet in the Outer Hebrides off the west coast of Scotland

Coordinates: 58.09537°N 6.50897°W

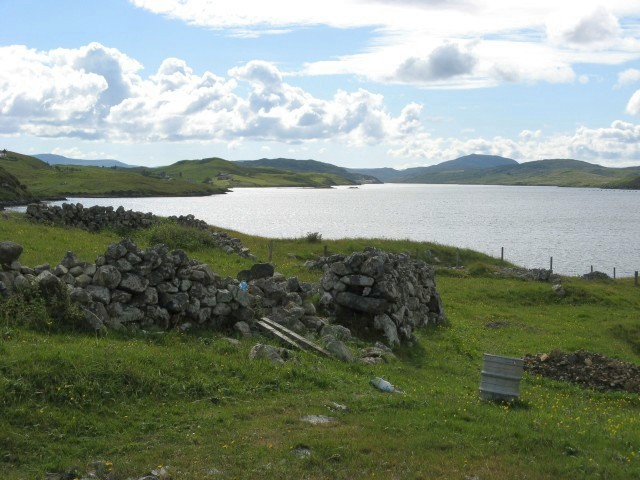

Loch Erisort (Scottish Gaelic: Èireasort) is an 8-mile (13-kilometre) long narrow sea inlet on the east coast of the Isle of Lewis in the Outer Hebrides off the west coast of Scotland.

The nearest town is Balallan. The loch is used by salmon fish farms.

The Loch is home to nesting Sea eagles, sea otters, deer, golden eagles and common seals.

Loch Erisort was thought to be the site of a dangerous programme about a secret mini sub testing in 1942.

Its name is a relic of the Viking Age and came from Old Norse Eiríksfjorðr = "Eric's fjord".

== Location references ==
- grid reference NB344207
