= HS postcode area =

Postcode area within the United Kingdom

Outer Hebrides
- Postcode area
- Coordinates: 57.967°N 6.712°W
- Country: United Kingdom
- Postcode area: HS
- Postcode area name: Outer Hebrides
- Post towns: 8
- Postcode districts: 9
- Postcode sectors: 11
- Postcodes (live): 962
- Postcodes (total): 1,093
- Statistics as at May 2020

The HS postcode area, also known as the Outer Hebrides postcode area, is a group of nine postcode districts, within eight post towns, covering the Outer Hebrides in Scotland.

It is the UK's newest postcode area, the Outer Hebrides formerly being part of the PA postcode area (forming PA80 - PA87 until January 1995).

Mail for the HS postcode area is processed at Inverness Mail Centre, along with mail for the IV and KW postcode areas.

== Coverage ==
The approximate coverage of the postcode districts:

Postcode district	Post town	Coverage	Local authority area(s)
HS1	STORNOWAY	Stornoway (immediate area), Plasterfield	Comhairle nan Eilean Siar
HS2	ISLE OF LEWIS	Settlements in Lewis outside the Stornoway area including Back, Carloway, Ness, North Lochs, Park (South Lochs), Point, Uig and West Side	Comhairle nan Eilean Siar
HS3	ISLE OF HARRIS	Harris excluding Leverburgh and Rodel area	Comhairle nan Eilean Siar
HS4	ISLE OF SCALPAY	All settlements	Comhairle nan Eilean Siar
HS5	ISLE OF HARRIS	Leverburgh, Rodel	Comhairle nan Eilean Siar
HS6	ISLE OF NORTH UIST	All settlements	Comhairle nan Eilean Siar
HS7	ISLE OF BENBECULA	All settlements	Comhairle nan Eilean Siar
HS8	ISLE OF SOUTH UIST	All settlements	Comhairle nan Eilean Siar
HS9	ISLE OF BARRA	All settlements, including Mingulay	Comhairle nan Eilean Siar

== Map ==
HS postcode area map, showing postcode districts in red and post towns in grey text, with links to nearby IV and PH postcode areas.

== See also ==
- Postcode Address File
- List of postcode areas in the United Kingdom
