= 1994 Western Isles Islands Council election =

1994 Scottish local government election

| ← 1990 | 5 May 1994 | 1999 → |

29 of the 30 seats to Western Isles Council 15 seats needed for a majority
| | First party | Second party |
|---|---|---|
| Leader | Donald MacLeod |
| Party | Independent | Labour |
| Leader's seat | Shawbost |
| Last election | 30 seats, 100.0% | Did not stand |
| Seats won | 25 | 4 |
| Seat change | ▼5 | ▲4 |
| Popular vote | 6,468 | 737 |
| Percentage | 89.8% | 10.2% |
| Swing | ▼10.2% | New |
Council control before election
Donald MacLeod
Independent
Council control after election
Donald Mackay
Independent

The sixth election to Western Isles Islands Council was held on 5 May 1994 as part of the wider 1994 Scottish regional elections. One ward - Laxdale - was unfilled, as no individuals came forward as candidates.

The election saw a political party gain representation on the Council for the first time as the Labour Party won four seats.

== Aggregate results ==
The result of the election

Western Isles Council election, 1994 Turnout: 7,205
| Party | Seats | Gains | Losses | Net gain/loss | Seats % | Votes % | Votes | +/− |
|---|---|---|---|---|---|---|---|---|
| Independent | 25 | 0 | ▼5 | ▼5 | 83.3 | 89.8 | 6,468 | ▼10.2 |
| Labour | 4 | 4 | 0 | ▲4 | 13.3 | 10.2 | 737 | New |
| Vacant | 1 | | | | 3.3 | | | |

== Ward results ==
Port of Ness
| Party | Candidate | Votes | % |
|---|---|---|---|
| Independent | K.M. MacKenzie | 270 | 56.7% |
| Labour | R.J. Murray | 206 | 43.2% |
| Majority | | 66 | 13.5% |
| Independent hold | | | |

Dell
| Party | Candidate | Votes | % |
|---|---|---|---|
| Independent | D.A. MacKay | 332 | 70.6% |
| Independent | Kathleen MacAskill (Incumbent) | 138 | 29.3% |
| Majority | | 194 | 51.3% |
| Independent hold | | | |

Barvas
| Party | Candidate | Votes | % |
|---|---|---|---|
| Independent | R. MacDonald (Incumbent) | unopposed | unopposed |
| Majority | | unopposed | unopposed |
| Independent hold | | | |

Shawbost
| Party | Candidate | Votes | % |
|---|---|---|---|
| Independent | Donald MacLeod (Incumbent) | 390 | 60.9% |
| Independent | N. Murray | 250 | 39.0% |
| Majority | | 140 | 21.9% |
| Independent hold | | | |

Carloway
| Party | Candidate | Votes | % |
|---|---|---|---|
| Independent | Alex MacDonald (Incumbent) | unopposed | unopposed |
| Majority | | unopposed | unopposed |
| Independent hold | | | |

Uig
| Party | Candidate | Votes | % |
|---|---|---|---|
| Independent | J. Campbell | 247 | 60.2% |
| Independent | Donald MacAulay (Incumbent) | 163 | 39.7% |
| Majority | | 84 | 20.5% |
| Independent hold | | | |

Gress
| Party | Candidate | Votes | % |
|---|---|---|---|
| Independent | Angus Graham (Incumbent) | unopposed | unopposed |
| Majority | | unopposed | unopposed |
| Independent hold | | | |

Coll
| Party | Candidate | Votes | % |
|---|---|---|---|
| Independent | A. Nicholson (Incumbent) | 229 | 52.1% |
| Independent | D.M. MacLean | 210 | 47.8% |
| Majority | | 19 | 4.3% |
| Independent hold | | | |

Blackwater
| Party | Candidate | Votes | % |
|---|---|---|---|
| Independent | D. Murray | unopposed | unopposed |
| Majority | | unopposed | unopposed |
| Independent hold | | | |

Laxdale
| Party | Candidate | Votes | % |
|---|---|---|---|
| | No Nominations | | |
| Majority | | | |

Coulregrein
| Party | Candidate | Votes | % |
|---|---|---|---|
| Labour | G. Lonie (Incumbent) | unopposed | unopposed |
| Majority | | unopposed | unopposed |
| Labour gain from Independent | | | |

Manor Park
| Party | Candidate | Votes | % |
|---|---|---|---|
| Independent | D.H. MacIver (Incumbent) | unopposed | unopposed |
| Majority | | unopposed | unopposed |
| Independent hold | | | |

Bayhead
| Party | Candidate | Votes | % |
|---|---|---|---|
| Independent | A.G. Macrae | 369 | 62.2% |
| Independent | Murdo Afrin (Incumbent) | 224 | 37.7% |
| Majority | | 145 | 24.5% |
| Independent hold | | | |

Goathill
| Party | Candidate | Votes | % |
|---|---|---|---|
| Independent | N.L. MacDonald | 305 | 70.1% |
| Independent | M.J. MacLeod | 130 | 29.8% |
| Majority | | 175 | 40.3% |
| Independent hold | | | |

Newton
| Party | Candidate | Votes | % |
|---|---|---|---|
| Labour | F.S. Burns | 234 | 52.5% |
| Independent | H. Smith | 142 | 31.9% |
| Independent | J. Kerr | 69 | 15.5% |
| Majority | | 92 | 30.6% |
| Labour gain from Independent | | | |

Sandwick
| Party | Candidate | Votes | % |
|---|---|---|---|
| Independent | Donald Nicholson (Incumbent) | unopposed | unopposed |
| Majority | | unopposed | unopposed |
| Independent hold | | | |

Aignish
| Party | Candidate | Votes | % |
|---|---|---|---|
| Labour | C.I. Macmillan | 297 | 48.6% |
| Independent | N. MacAskill | 212 | 34.7% |
| Independent | W. MacLeod | 101 | 16.5% |
| Majority | | 85 | 13.9% |
| Labour gain from Independent | | | |

Tiumpan
| Party | Candidate | Votes | % |
|---|---|---|---|
| Labour | I. MacSween (Incumbent) | unopposed | unopposed |
| Majority | | unopposed | unopposed |
| Labour gain from Independent | | | |

North Lochs
| Party | Candidate | Votes | % |
|---|---|---|---|
| Independent | A. MacLeod (Incumbent) | unopposed | unopposed |
| Majority | | unopposed | unopposed |
| Independent hold | | | |

Lochs
| Party | Candidate | Votes | % |
|---|---|---|---|
| Independent | Donald Mackay (Incumbent) | unopposed | unopposed |
| Majority | | unopposed | unopposed |
| Independent hold | | | |

Tarbert
| Party | Candidate | Votes | % |
|---|---|---|---|
| Independent | Kenny Mackay | 212 | 60.9% |
| Independent | C. Pratt | 136 | 39.0% |
| Majority | | 76 | 21.9% |
| Independent hold | | | |

Bays
| Party | Candidate | Votes | % |
|---|---|---|---|
| Independent | D. MacDonald (Incumbent) | unopposed | unopposed |
| Majority | | unopposed | unopposed |
| Independent hold | | | |

Obbe
| Party | Candidate | Votes | % |
|---|---|---|---|
| Independent | N. MacDonald | 225 | 54.6% |
| Independent | M.A. MacLean (Incumbent) | 187 | 45.3% |
| Majority | | 38 | 9.3% |
| Independent hold | | | |

Paible
| Party | Candidate | Votes | % |
|---|---|---|---|
| Independent | C. McNeill | unopposed | unopposed |
| Majority | | unopposed | unopposed |
| Independent hold | | | |

Lochmaddy
| Party | Candidate | Votes | % |
|---|---|---|---|
| Independent | D. MacLean | unopposed | unopposed |
| Majority | | unopposed | unopposed |
| Independent hold | | | |

Benbecula
| Party | Candidate | Votes | % |
|---|---|---|---|
| Independent | J.C.F. Campbell | 348 | 70.0% |
| Independent | J.A. MacLellan | 149 | 29.9% |
| Majority | | 199 | 40.1% |
| Independent hold | | | |

Iochdar
| Party | Candidate | Votes | % |
|---|---|---|---|
| Independent | Mary Bremner (Incumbent) | 346 | 69.4% |
| Independent | C. Malone | 152 | 30.5% |
| Majority | | 194 | 38.9% |
| Independent hold | | | |

Lochboisdale
| Party | Candidate | Votes | % |
|---|---|---|---|
| Independent | David Blaney | 251 | 42.8% |
| Independent | J.L. McArthur | 216 | 36.8% |
| Independent | Angus MacDonald | 119 | 20.3% |
| Majority | | 35 | 6.0% |
| Independent hold | | | |

Northbay
| Party | Candidate | Votes | % |
|---|---|---|---|
| Independent | R. MacKinnon (Incumbent) | unopposed | unopposed |
| Majority | | unopposed | unopposed |
| Independent hold | | | |

Castlebay
| Party | Candidate | Votes | % |
|---|---|---|---|
| Independent | A.F. MacLeod | 284 | 82.0% |
| Independent | E. McAtear (Incumbent) | 62 | 17.9% |
| Majority | | 222 | 64.1% |
| Independent hold | | | |
