= Mealaisbhal =

Hill on the Isle of Lewis, Scotland

Mealasbhal
- Mealisval or Mealaseal
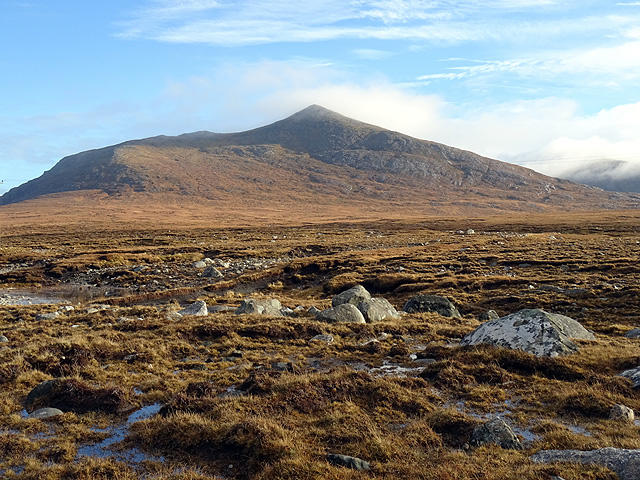
- Mealasbhal

Highest point
- Elevation: 574 m (1,883 ft)
- Prominence: 519 m (1,703 ft)
- Listing: Marilyn

Geography
- Location: Isle of Lewis, Outer Hebrides, Scotland
- Parent range: Uig Hills
- OS grid: NB022270
- Topo map: OS Landranger 13

Mealasbhal (574 m) is the highest peak on the Isle of Lewis in the Outer Hebrides of Scotland.

It is the highest of the Uig hills on the west coast of the island. It is usually climbed from the small village of Brenish where it provides excellent views from its summit. Looking westwards out to the North Atlantic the Flannan Isles and further offshore to St Kilda, Scotland.

The hill rises up directly from the heather Machair on the Brenish side and is primarily heather covered until the approach to the summit which is rocky and strewn with boulders. There are various lochs strewn around the base and the Brenish river runs from one directly through the village to the bay.
