= Park End =

Park End may be one of several places in the United Kingdom:

- Park End, Bedfordshire, England
- Park End, Cambridgeshire, England
- Park End, Middlesbrough, England
- Park End, Northumberland, England
- Park End, Somerset, England
- Park End, South Ayrshire, Scotland
- Park End, Staffordshire, England
- Park End, Worcestershire, England

== See also ==
- Parkend, Gloucestershire, England
  - Parkend railway station
- Parkend, Lewis, Scotland
