= Holm, Lewis =

Coordinates: 58.198°N 6.332°W

Holm: Scottish Gaelic: Tolm
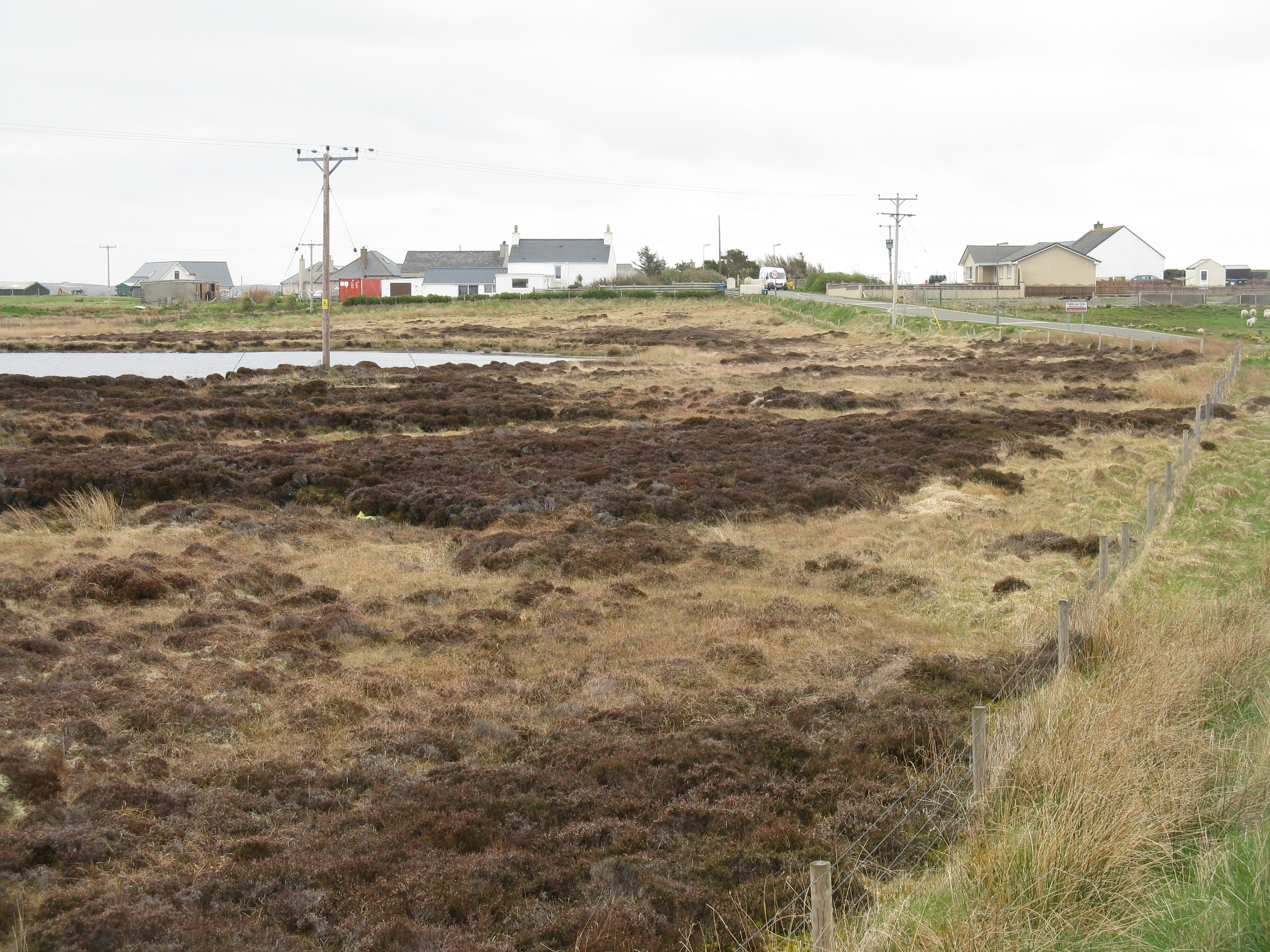
- A small community by the Shildinis headland

- Location within the Outer Hebrides
- Language: Scottish Gaelic; English
- OS grid reference: NB454313
- Civil parish: Stornoway
- Council area: Na h-Eileanan Siar
- Lieutenancy area: Western Isles
- Country: Scotland
- Sovereign state: United Kingdom
- Post town: STORNOWAY
- Postcode district: HS2
- Dialling code: 01851
- Police: Scotland
- Fire: Scottish
- Ambulance: Scottish
- UK Parliament: Na h-Eileanan an Iar
- Scottish Parliament: Na h-Eileanan an Iar

Holm Village (Scottish Gaelic: Tolm) is a village in the Scottish Outer Hebrides, on the Isle of Lewis near Stornoway. The modern area of Holm can be split into two distinct areas - "Holm Village" and "Holm Road with Parkend". Holm is within the parish of Stornoway.

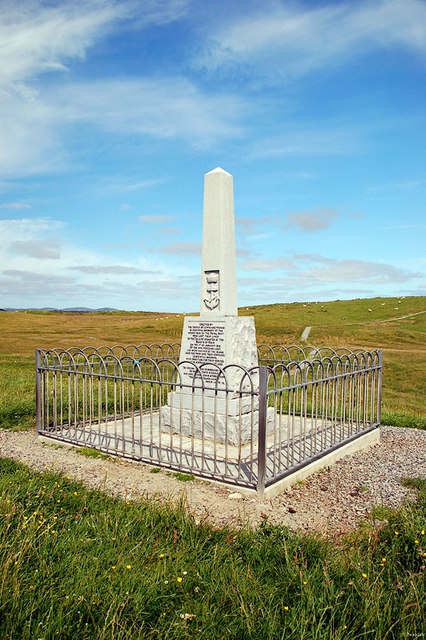
Iolaire Memorial

The Iolaire Memorial on Holm Point commemorates Admiralty Yacht HMS Iolaire, lost on rocks lying to the south in 1919. 205 died, many of them war veterans returning to the island.

== See also ==
- Lewis and Harris
- History of the Outer Hebrides
