= 1999 Comhairle nan Eilean Siar election =

← 1994	6 May 1999	2003 →

All 31 seats to Western Isles Council 16 seats needed for a majority

	First party	Second party	Third party
Leader	Donald Mackay
Party	Independent	Labour	SNP
Leader's seat	Lochs
Last election	25 seats, 89.8%	4 seats, 10.2%	Did not stand
Seats won	22	5	4
Seat change	▼3	▲1	▲4
Popular vote	6,866	935	1,468
Percentage	74.1%	10.1%	15.8%
Swing	▼15.7%	▼0.1%	New
Council Convener before election
Donald Mackay
Independent
Council Convener after election
Alex Macdonald
Independent

An election to Comhairle nan Eilean Siar was held on 6 May 1999 as part of the wider 1999 Scottish local elections.

The council, formerly known as Western Isles Council, had been renamed in 1997 in Gaelic as Comhairle nan Eilean Siar. Council ward boundaries had also been changed since the previous election, and the total number of wards was increased from 30 to 31.

The election was the first since 1994. Whilst the new Scottish councils had seen elections in 1995, the three Island Councils (Western Isles, Shetland and Orkney) had not, as they had not been affected by the abolition of the regional and district levels of governance in Scotland. The Island Councils had instead utilised a unitary system, like that adopted by the other Scottish councils in 1995, since their inception.

The Scottish National Party ran candidates for the first time, gaining four seats.

== Aggregate results ==
Comhairle nan Eilean Siar election, 1999 Turnout in contested wards: 64.2% (9,269)
Party	Seats	Gains	Losses	Net gain/loss	Seats %	Votes %	Votes	+/−
Independent	22			▼3		74.1	6,866	▼15.7
Labour	5			▲1		10.1	935	▼0.1
SNP	4			▲4		15.8	1,468	New

== Ward results ==
Barra & Vatersay
Party	Candidate	Votes	%
SNP	Donald Manford	418	73.5%
Independent	P. Brown	151	26.5%
Majority		267	46.9%
SNP gain from Independent			

Barvas & Arnol
Party	Candidate	Votes	%
Independent	Iain Morrison	275	53.9%
Independent	R. Macdonald (Incumbent)	235	46.1%
Majority		40	7.8%
Independent hold			

Bayhead
Party	Candidate	Votes	%
Independent	A. MacRae (Incumbent)	unopposed	unopposed
Majority		unopposed	unopposed
Independent hold			

Blackwater
Party	Candidate	Votes	%
Independent	Iain MacLeod	286	58.1%
Independent	D. Murray (Incumbent)	206	41.9%
Majority		82	16.3%
Independent hold			

Braighe
Party	Candidate	Votes	%
Independent	Donald Nicholson (Incumbent)	312	57.1%
Independent	M. McCormack	156	28.6%
Labour	E. Collier	78	14.3%
Majority		156	28.6%
Independent hold			

Carloway
Party	Candidate	Votes	%
Independent	Alex MacDonald (Incumbent)	unopposed	unopposed
Majority		unopposed	unopposed
Independent hold			

Castle
Party	Candidate	Votes	%
SNP	A. Nicolson	197	46.7%
Labour	C. MacMillan (Incumbent)	146	34.6%
Independent	M. O'Connor	79	18.7%
Majority		51	12.1%
SNP gain from Labour			

Coll
Party	Candidate	Votes	%
Independent	C. Graham	unopposed	unopposed
Majority		unopposed	unopposed
Independent hold			

Coulregrein
Party	Candidate	Votes	%
Labour	G. Lonie	unopposed	unopposed
Majority		unopposed	unopposed
Labour hold			

Daliburgh & Eriskay
Party	Candidate	Votes	%
Independent	David Blaney (Incumbent)	174	43.6%
Independent	Angus MacDonald	137	34.3%
Independent	W. Rusk	88	22.1%
Majority		37	9.3%
Independent hold			

Dell
Party	Candidate	Votes	%
SNP	M. MacLeod	161	32.2%
Independent	J. MacKay	133	26.6%
Independent	R. Martin	125	25.0%
Independent	D. MacKay (Incumbent)	81	16.2%
Majority		28	5.6%
SNP gain from Independent			

Eochar
Party	Candidate	Votes	%
Independent	Mary Bremner (Incumbent)	unopposed	unopposed
Majority		unopposed	unopposed
Independent hold			

Goathill
Party	Candidate	Votes	%
Independent	N. MacDonald (Incumbent)	unopposed	unopposed
Majority		unopposed	unopposed
Independent hold			

Gress
Party	Candidate	Votes	%
Independent	Angus Graham (Incumbent)	319	53.1%
Independent	M. MacLeod	282	46.9%
Majority		37	6.2%
Independent hold			

Harris East
Party	Candidate	Votes	%
Independent	D. MacDonald	463	79.7%
Independent	Kenny MacKay (Incumbent)	118	20.3%
Majority		345	59.4%
Independent hold			

Harris West
Party	Candidate	Votes	%
Independent	Morag Munro	325	52.5%
Independent	W. Fulton	294	47.5%
Majority		31	5.0%
Independent hold			

Knock & Bayble
Party	Candidate	Votes	%
Independent	Norman MacLeod	295	60.3%
Independent	I. MacIver	194	39.7%
Majority		101	20.7%
Independent hold			

Laxdale
Party	Candidate	Votes	%
Labour	R. Murray (Incumbent)	unopposed	unopposed
Majority		unopposed	unopposed
Labour hold			

Loch Eynort
Party	Candidate	Votes	%
Independent	R. MacKinnon	unopposed	unopposed
Majority		unopposed	unopposed
Independent hold			

Lochmaddy
Party	Candidate	Votes	%
Independent	D. MacLean (Incumbent)	292	59.8%
SNP	A. MacDonald	196	40.2%
Majority		96	19.7%
Independent hold			

Lochs
Party	Candidate	Votes	%
Independent	D. MacKay (Incumbent)	365	73.4%
SNP	L. Mac An Ultaigh	132	26.6%
Majority		233	46.9%
Independent hold			

Manor Park
Party	Candidate	Votes	%
Labour	R. MacDonald	266	59.0%
Independent	D. MacIver (Incumbent)	185	41.0%
Majority		81	18.0%
Labour gain from Independent			

Newton
Party	Candidate	Votes	%
Independent	Angus Campbell	284	64.4%
Labour	F. Burns (Incumbent)	114	25.9%
Independent	A. Smith	43	9.8%
Majority		170	38.5%
Independent gain from Labour			

North Benbecula
Party	Candidate	Votes	%
Independent	J. McArthur	159	53.4%
Independent	D. Johnstone	139	46.6%
Majority		20	6.7%
Independent hold			

North Lochs
Party	Candidate	Votes	%
Independent	F. Morrison (Incumbent)	unopposed	unopposed
Majority		unopposed	unopposed
Independent hold			

Paible
Party	Candidate	Votes	%
Labour	Archie Campbell	unopposed	unopposed
Majority		unopposed	unopposed
Labour gain from Independent			

Plasterfield
Party	Candidate	Votes	%
SNP	P. McLean	260	57.0%
Labour	M. MacLeod	196	43.0%
Majority		64	14.0%
SNP gain from Independent			

Port of Ness
Party	Candidate	Votes	%
Independent	K. MacKenzie (Incumbent)	278	61.5%
Independent	D. MacLennan	174	38.5%
Majority		104	23.0%
Independent hold			

Shawbost
Party	Candidate	Votes	%
Independent	R. Morrison (Incumbent)	unopposed	unopposed
Majority		unopposed	unopposed
Independent hold			

Tiumpan
Party	Candidate	Votes	%
Independent	Donald MacSween	219	47.8%
Labour	A. Cameron	135	29.5%
SNP	M. MacKenzie	104	22.7%
Majority		84	18.3%
Independent gain from Labour			

Uig
Party	Candidate	Votes	%
Labour	Norman MacDonald (Incumbent)	unopposed	unopposed
Majority		unopposed	unopposed
Labour hold			
