= Sad Day We Left the Croft =

Sad Day We left The Croft

Compilation album by Various Artists
- Released: Vinyl release early 1981; Reissued on CD; 25 September 2007
- Recorded: Summer 1980 at Croft Studios, Tong, Isle of Lewis, Scotland
- Genre: Punk, Post punk, Indie, alternative rock
- Label: Adult Entertainments, Honcho

Sad Day We Left The Croft is a compilation album of punk bands from the Scottish Hebridean Isle of Lewis. It was recorded in 1980 and released in 1981. The single was played by John Peel on his influential BBC Radio 1 music show shortly after its release. Pressed in limited quantities, both the single and the album became cult items and copies have been much sought after by collectors.

== Recording ==
The album was recorded at Croft Recordings, a small studio at Tong, about 5 miles from Stornoway. As the first recording studio in the Western Isles, Croft had been set up by Noel Eadie, a former member of Gaelic folk group Na h-Òganaich, in order to record local Gaelic and traditional music.

== Formats and releases ==
Sad Day We Left The Croft was first released in 1981 as a 12-inch vinyl LP on an independent record label, Adult Entertainments, based in Stornoway, and also in a cassette version by Croft Recordings. A related 7 inch vinyl single on Adult Entertainments was also released in 1981.

On 25 September 2007, Stornoway-based independent record label Honcho reissued the Sad Day We Left The Croft album on CD. All the original tracks were remastered for the CD release. Additional tracks on the CD include both tracks from the related single, and four other previously unreleased tracks.

== Background ==
In the late 1970s during the punk era, bands sprang up all across Britain following the musical style and 'do it yourself' ethos of groups such as the Ramones, Sex Pistols, and The Clash. This phenomenon was not confined to cities - many small towns and rural areas also had local punk music scenes, including the Western Isles of Scotland, where traditional Celtic and Gaelic music, and local covers bands had mainly prevailed. A number of punk bands emerged around the main town of Stornoway on Isle of Lewis. By 1979 there were several local punk and post punk bands, including The Bland, The Rong, The Subjects, Bruce Wayne Band, Noise Annoys, Battery Boys and Dirty Girls - and in 1980 they recorded the tracks for the album and the single.

== In popular media ==
The making and impact of the album are the subject of a BBC Gaelic television documentary in the arts series Ealtainn, also titled Sad Day We Left The Croft. The 30 minute programme produced by Moja and MacTV was first broadcast on BBC Two Scotland on 27 September 2007.

== Track listing ==
=== Original Compilation Album ===
==== Side one ====
1. Noise Annoys: "Living (in the world today)" – 1:28
2. The Rong: "Treatment" – 3:38
3. The Bland: "River Creed" – 4:28
4. Addo: "Deep down inside" – 5:56
5. The Subjects: "Paradise" – 5:14
6. Bruce Wayne Band: "First year fear" – 2:53

==== Side two ====
1. Dirty Girls: "Love or lust?" – 1:34
2. The Rong: "Union Jack" – 2:29
3. The Bland: "Letters while travelling" – 2:43
4. Addo: "Ocean of love" – 6:07
5. The Subjects: "Coming to save you?" – 4:14
6. Bruce Wayne Band: "Nightmares" – 2:04
7. Noise Annoys: "New heroes" – 1:25

All tracks recorded in 1980 at Tong Studio, Isle of Lewis c. Adult Entertainments 1981 ADD 1LP

=== Bonus tracks (only on CD reissue 2007) ===
==== Single (released 1981) ====
1. Noise Annoys: "Tomorrow" – 2:18
2. Battery Boys: "Cheap Local Talent" – 2:51

==== The Croft Sessions (1979 - previously unreleased) ====
1. The Bland: "Fun Fun Fun" – 1:08
2. The Bland: "Heads Blown Off in Slow Motion" – 2:45
3. The Bland: "Passions" – 2:39
4. The Bland: "River Elbe" – 4:09
