= Parkend, Lewis =

Coordinates: 58.202°N 6.341°W

Parkend: Scottish Gaelic: Ceann nam Buailtean
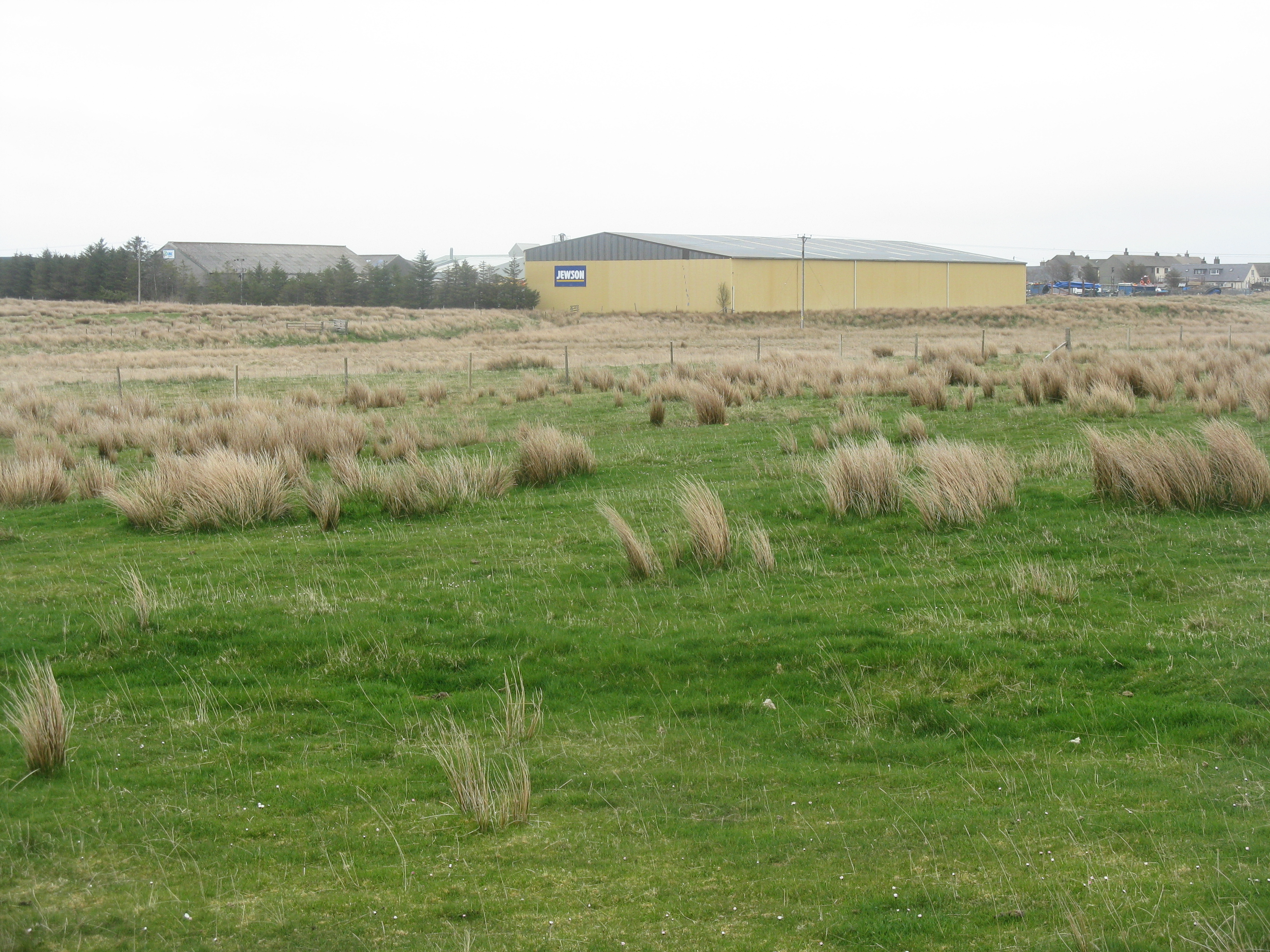
- A view across a field to the Parkend Industrial Estate

- Location within the Outer Hebrides
- Language: Scottish Gaelic; English
- OS grid reference: NB449318
- Civil parish: Stornoway
- Council area: Outer Hebrides
- Lieutenancy area: Western Isles
- Country: Scotland
- Sovereign state: United Kingdom
- Post town: STORNOWAY
- Postcode district: HS2
- Dialling code: 01851
- Police: Scotland
- Fire: Scottish
- Ambulance: Scottish
- UK Parliament: Na h-Eileanan an Iar
- Scottish Parliament: Na h-Eileanan an Iar

Parkend (Scottish Gaelic: Ceann nam Buailtean) is a hamlet in the Sandwick region of the Isle of Lewis, although like Melbost, it is not a part of the Eye Peninsula. Many people erroneously believe it to be a suburb of Stornoway, on the island of Lewis and Harris in the Outer Hebrides of Scotland. Parkend is within the parish of Stornoway. Parkend is situated on the A866, and the adjoining Holm Road allows access to the nearby Holm Village. The Parkend Industrial Estate is adjacent to the small housing estate.

== See also ==
- History of the Outer Hebrides
