= Brenish =

Coordinates: 58.122°N 7.110°W

Brenish: Scottish Gaelic: Brèinis
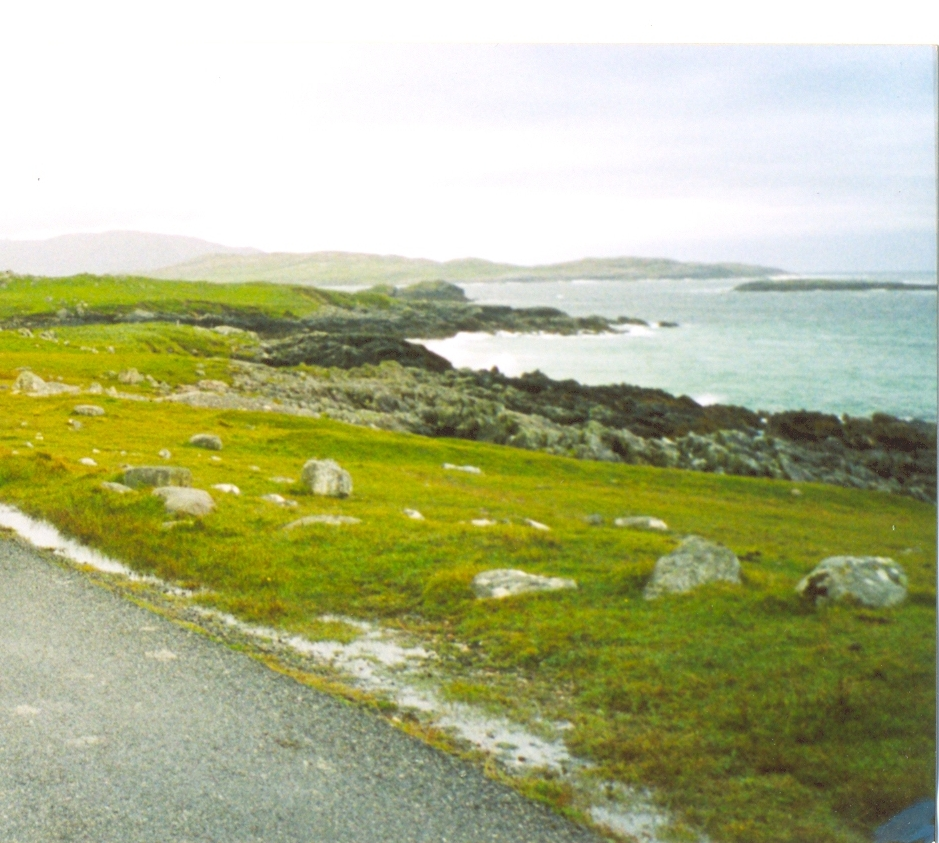
- Brenish coastline

- Location within the Outer Hebrides
- Population: 25
- Language: Scottish Gaelic; English
- OS grid reference: NA991261
- Civil parish: Uig
- Council area: Na h-Eileanan Siar
- Lieutenancy area: Western Isles
- Country: Scotland
- Sovereign state: United Kingdom
- Post town: ISLE OF LEWIS
- Postcode district: HS2
- Dialling code: 01851
- Police: Scotland
- Fire: Scottish
- Ambulance: Scottish
- UK Parliament: Na h-Eileanan an Iar
- Scottish Parliament: Na h-Eileanan an Iar

Brenish (Scottish Gaelic: Brèinis) is a small village situated on the west coast of the Isle of Lewis, which is part of the Outer Hebrides of Scotland. Brenish is within the parish of Uig. The name of the village is sometimes spelt Breanish (which is generally the spelling used locally), however maps normally refer to Brenish.

== Geography ==
Brenish is commonly regarded as one of the more scenic areas on the island, although its remote location at the end of the winding and decaying C39 makes it one of the less visited. The village itself runs parallel to the Atlantic coastline and is overlooked by Mealisval, the tallest mountain on the island. It is located next to the village of Mealista which is an uninhabited village known best for its selection of virginal sandy beaches. Mealista is where the road ends, making Brenish the last populated village on the C39.

Brenish can be reached by taking the A859 from Stornoway or Tarbert, Harris, then turning on to the A858 towards Garynahine. This route then travels along the B8011, which then becomes the C39 at Timsgarry. The journey takes between 60 and 90 minutes from Stornoway and 90 to 120 minutes from Tarbert (depending on driving experience on the Lewis roads).

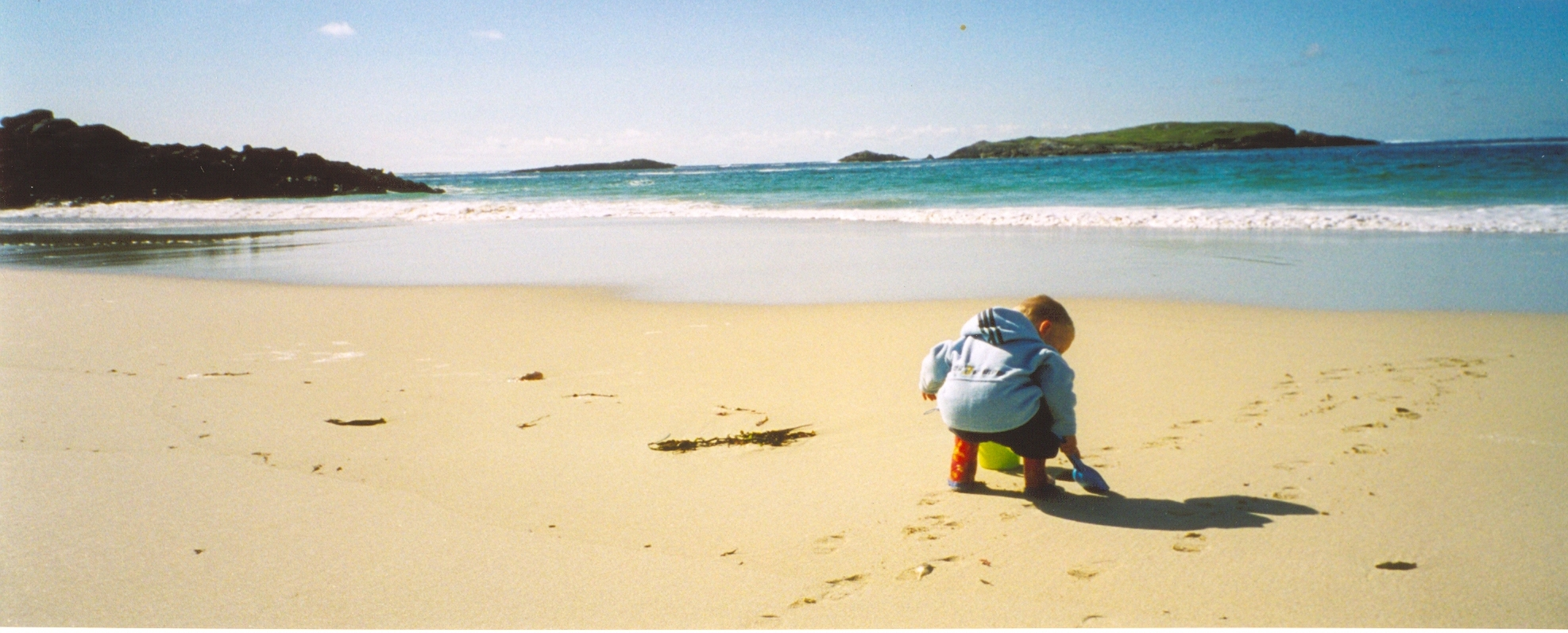
Mealista beach

=== Geology ===
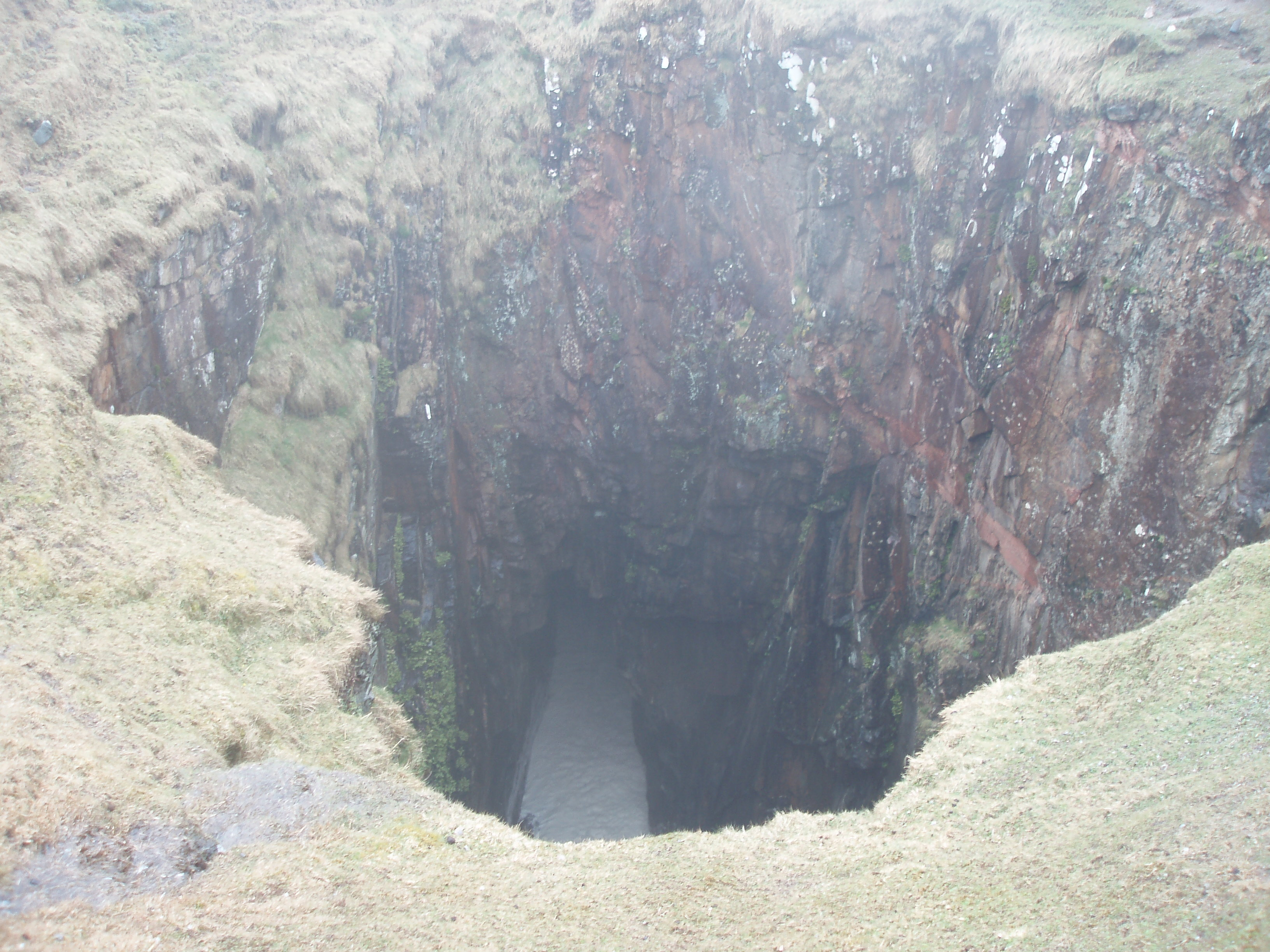
The "Blowhole"

One of the more interesting features of Brenish is the Blowhole. This is a deep hole in the ground which is roughly 20 metres inland. It has a sea cave which funnels sea water into the hole, sometimes with such ferocity that the sea water blows out the top of the hole. The hole is situated to the north of the village and although it is large it can easily be missed because it is situated in a dip in the ground. There is no fencing around the hole making it a hazard to the unsuspecting walker.

=== Flora and fauna ===
The terrain is mainly heather covered moorland which is peppered with lochs of varying size, which are kept full by the plentiful supply of rain. This land contains high quantities of peat, which is still used by many in the village as a fuel source for heating and cooking. The land between Brenish and Islivig is peat cutting land which has supplied the village with fuel for decades. Due to the wild, damp, salty climate only hardy vegetation is able to survive.

There are still a large number of sheep roaming freely and there is an increasing number of deer which can be seen coming into villagers gardens in the evening. Other natives include rabbit, hare, rat, and feral cat. There have also been sightings of frogs in recent years which is a new addition to the area. There are regular sightings of seal fishing for salmon and sea trout in the Brenish bay.

Lewis provides a good stop off point for migrating birds which can be seen along with the hardy native seabirds. Golden eagles have also been known to make an occasional visit to the village.

=== Climate ===
The oceanic climate means that Brenish experiences high volumes of rain, with temperatures struggling to reach double figures for a large part of the year. However, Brenish is far enough north to benefit from long summer days where there is daylight for over 20 hours. It is also a good place to view the Aurora Borealis (otherwise known as the Northern Lights).

== Demography ==
Brenish was once a highly populated village but has suffered a drastic decline in its numbers during the 1900s, brought about by a combination of the younger generation opting to move to the mainland and the demise of the ageing residents. There is very little employment in the local area and the traditional occupation of crofting has itself been in rapid decline since the 1980s. However, since the late 1990s the village has experienced a relative population boom. Over 50% of the population have migrated to Brenish from the UK mainland which has brought with it a feeling of revival.

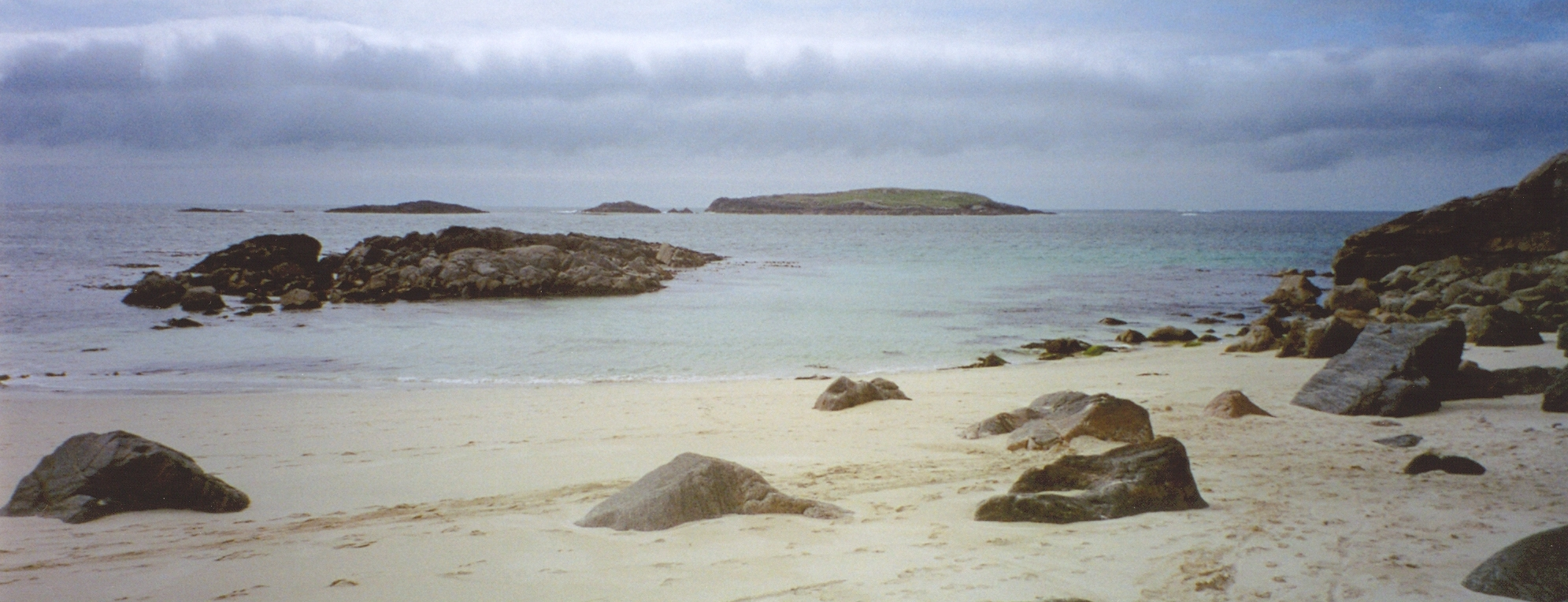
Mealista beach

== Community ==
=== Architecture ===
The architecture in the area is fairly typical for the island. Generally the houses are built beside the road, at the top of a croft which itself leads down to the sea. There have been several new houses built since the late 1990s which are changing the face of the village.

=== Religion ===
Brenish, like all parts of the Hebrides, has a strong religious (Presbyterian) population. To this end there is normally very little activity in the village on Sunday. Until relatively recent years even the act of watching television on Sunday would have been frowned upon.
