= Laxdale =

Coordinates: 58.228°N 6.389°W

Laxdale: Scottish Gaelic: Lacasdal
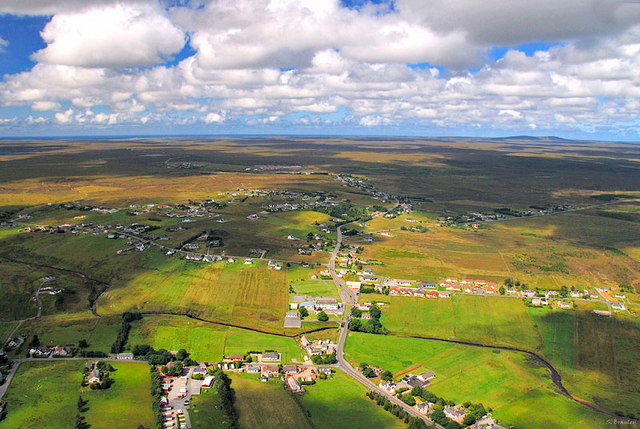
- An aerial view of Laxdale

- Location within the Outer Hebrides
- Language: Scottish Gaelic; English
- OS grid reference: NB423349
- Civil parish: Stornoway
- Council area: Na h-Eileanan Siar
- Lieutenancy area: Western Isles
- Country: Scotland
- Sovereign state: United Kingdom
- Post town: STORNOWAY
- Postcode district: HS2
- Dialling code: 01851
- Police: Scotland
- Fire: Scottish
- Ambulance: Scottish
- UK Parliament: Na h-Eileanan an Iar
- Scottish Parliament: Na h-Eileanan an Iar

Laxdale (Scottish Gaelic: Lacasdal) is a village in the Scottish Outer Hebrides, on the Isle of Lewis. Although nominally a distinct village, Laxdale is now effectively a suburb of Stornoway. Laxdale is also within the parish of Stornoway. There is a school called Laxdale School. The Abhainn Lacasdail or Laxdale River passes along the northern side of Laxdale. The A857 runs through Laxdale, from Stornoway to Port of Ness.

== See also ==
- Lewis and Harris
- History of the Outer Hebrides
