= Atlantic Bronze Age =

Period of approximately 1300-700 BC in Europe

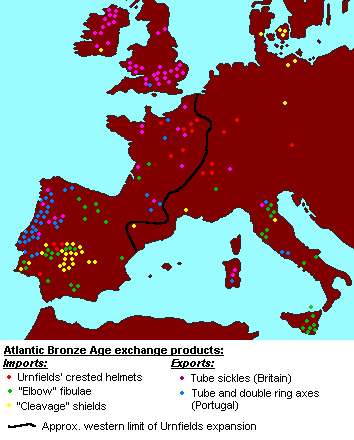
- Geographical range: Western Europe
- Period: Bronze Age
- Dates: c. 1300 – c. 700 BC
- Preceded by: Bell Beaker culture, Bronze Age Britain, Armorican Tumulus culture, Wessex culture, Argaric culture
- Followed by: Iron Age Britain, Iron Age Ireland, Iron Age France, Iron Age Spain

The Atlantic Bronze Age is a term that has never been formally defined. Some take its meaning to be a label for the period spanning approximately 1300–700 BC in Britain, France, Ireland, Portugal and Spain; that is, the Atlantic coast of Europe. Others assign it to a cultural complex of the Bronze Age period in prehistoric Europe that is defined by the culture prevalent at this time and location.

== Trade ==
The Atlantic Bronze Age is characterized by economic and cultural exchange between far-flung communities, resulting in a high degree of cultural similarity seen in coastal communities ranging from central Portugal in the south of coastal Europe, through Galicia (Spain), the Atlantic coast of France, including Armorica (Brittany) to Cornwall in southwest England and as far north as Scotland. This is evidenced by the frequent use of stone as chevaux-de-frise, the construction of cliff castles, and a similarity of domestic architecture and living spaces, sometimes characterized by roundhouses. Trade contacts extended northwards and eastwards to Sweden and Denmark and eastwards as far as the Mediterranean.

== Metal production ==
This Bronze Age culture was characterized by distinct regional centers of metal production, linked by regular maritime trade. The main centers were in southern England and Ireland, northwestern France, and western Iberia (Spain and Portugal). Items associated with this culture are often found in hoards or deposited in ritual areas. Metal finds have typically been preserved in watery contexts such as rivers, lakes, and bogs. This cultural complex includes various items, such as socketed and double-ring bronze axes, sometimes found buried in large hoards in Brittany and Galicia. Military equipment such as lunate spearheads, V-notched shields, and a variety of bronze swords, including carp-tongue swords, are usually found buried in lakes, rivers, or rocky outcrops. Elite feasting equipment such as spits, kettles, and meat hooks have also been found from central Portugal to Scotland.

== Celtic influence ==
It is during this period that the Celts rose to prominence in Europe In particular, the Celtic language may have developed as an Atlantic lingua franca. Communities may have adopted elite status markers such as grip-tongue swords and bronze sheet metalwork from the Urnfield period (Bronze D and Hallstatt A) and they must also have acquired the skills for their production, and ritual knowledge about their proper treatment involving deposition. These changes may indicate processes related to language change. The emergence of Celtic languages with a Proto-Celtic homeland in west-central Europe can be explained by elite contact from east to west. However, this view contrasts with the more widely accepted view that Celtic origins are linked to the central European Hallstatt C culture.

== Gallery ==
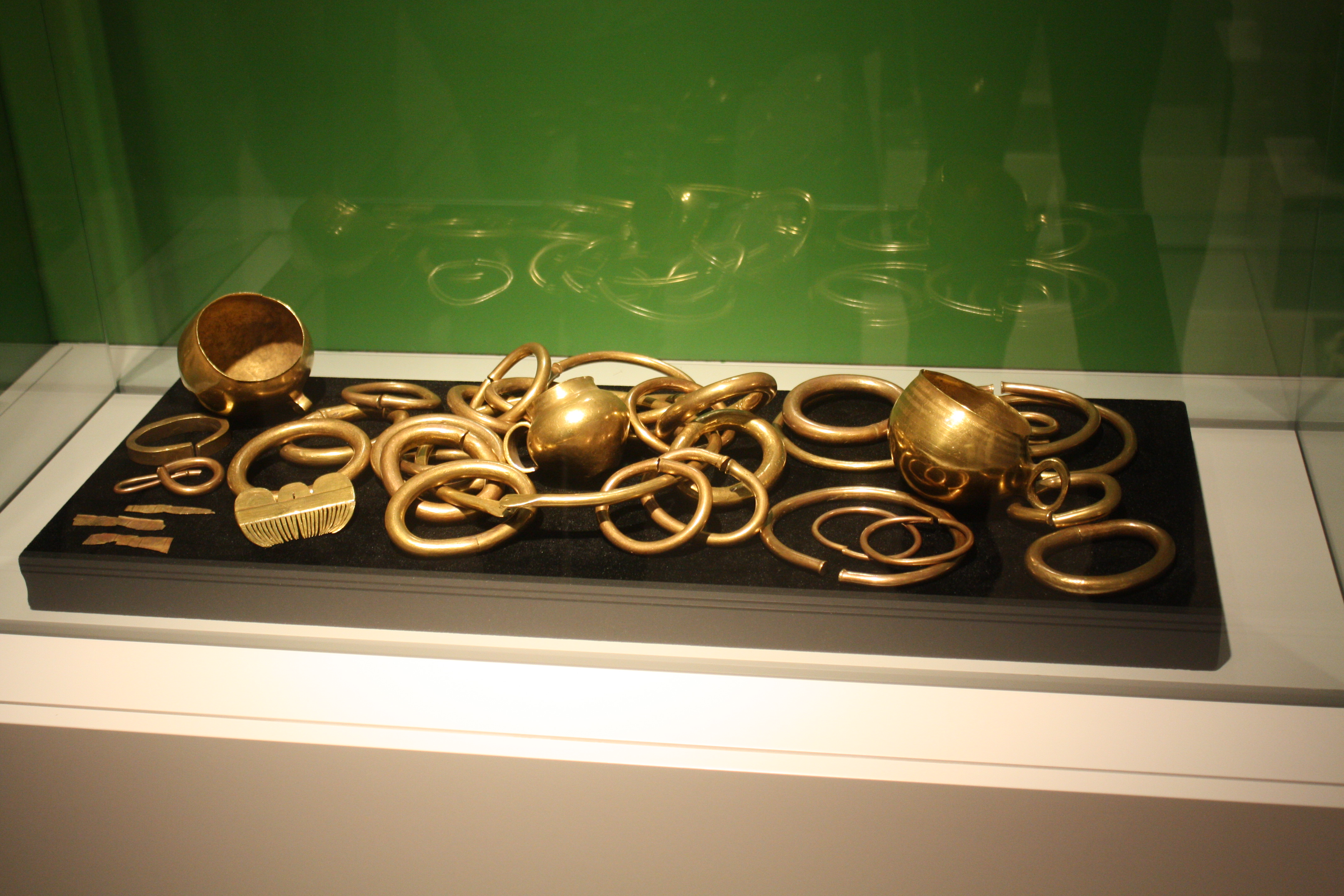
A Bronze Age gold hoard: Tesouro de Caldas, Galicia, Spain

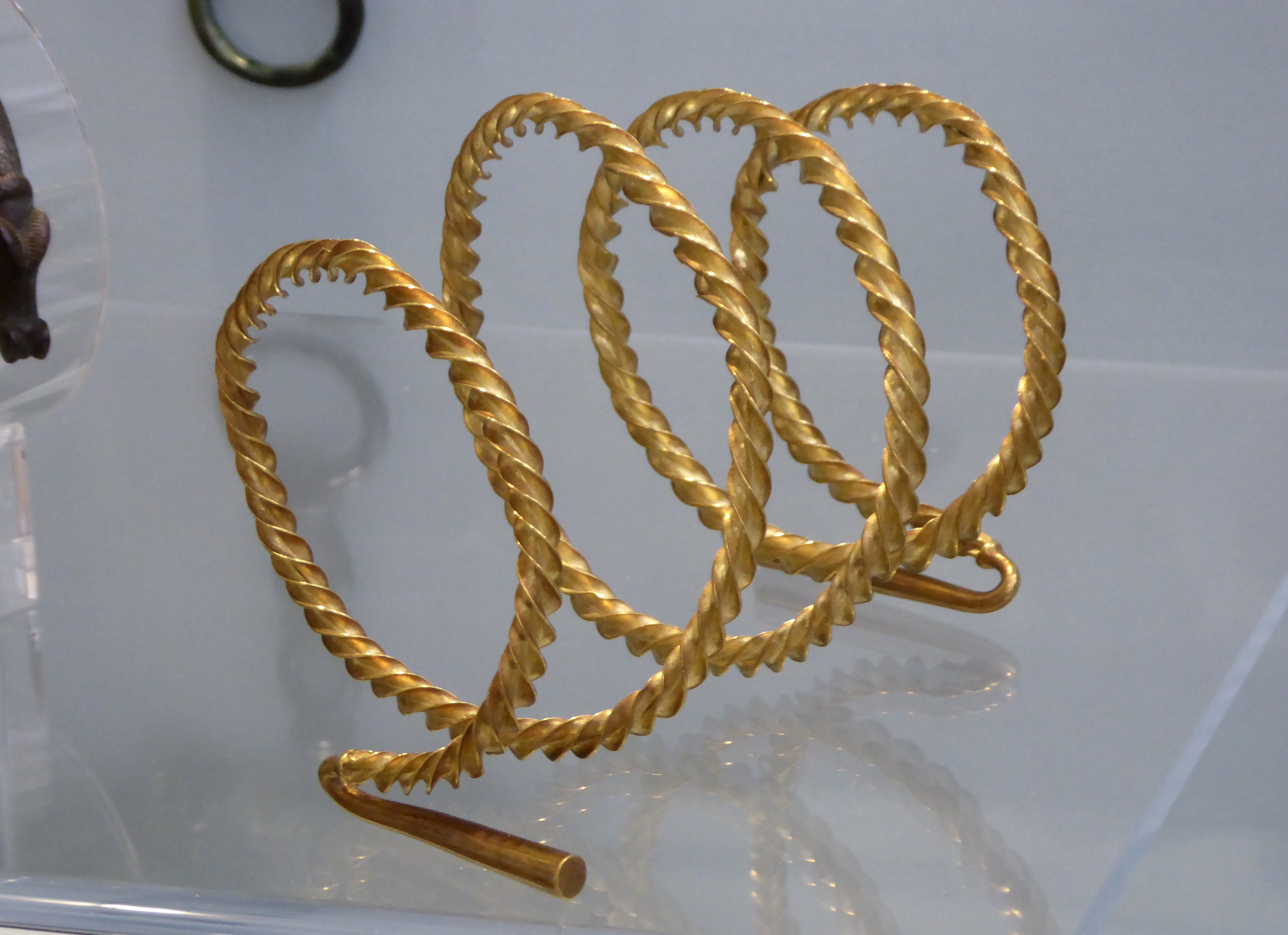
Gold torque from Stretham, England

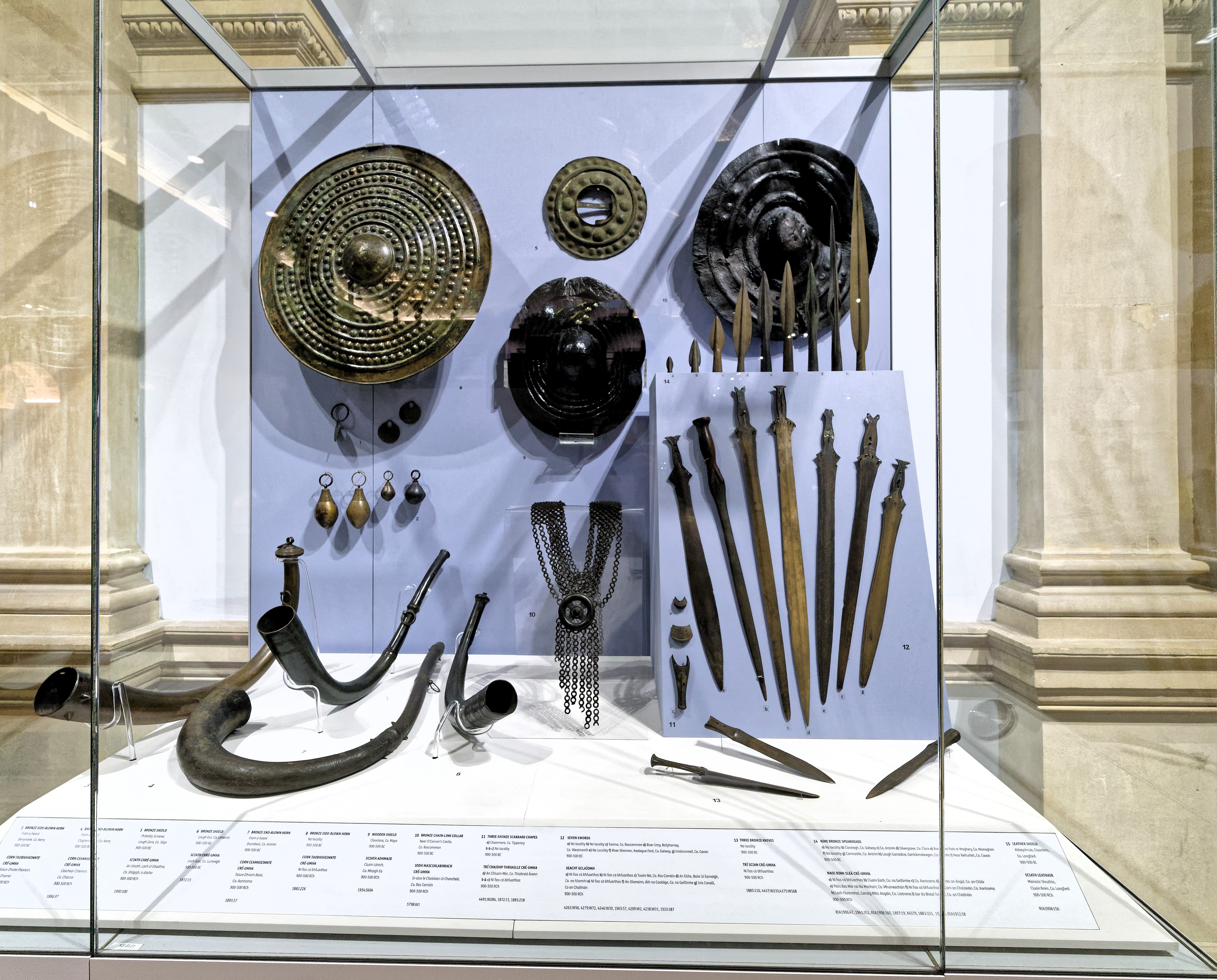
Bronze weapons, shields and musical instruments, Ireland

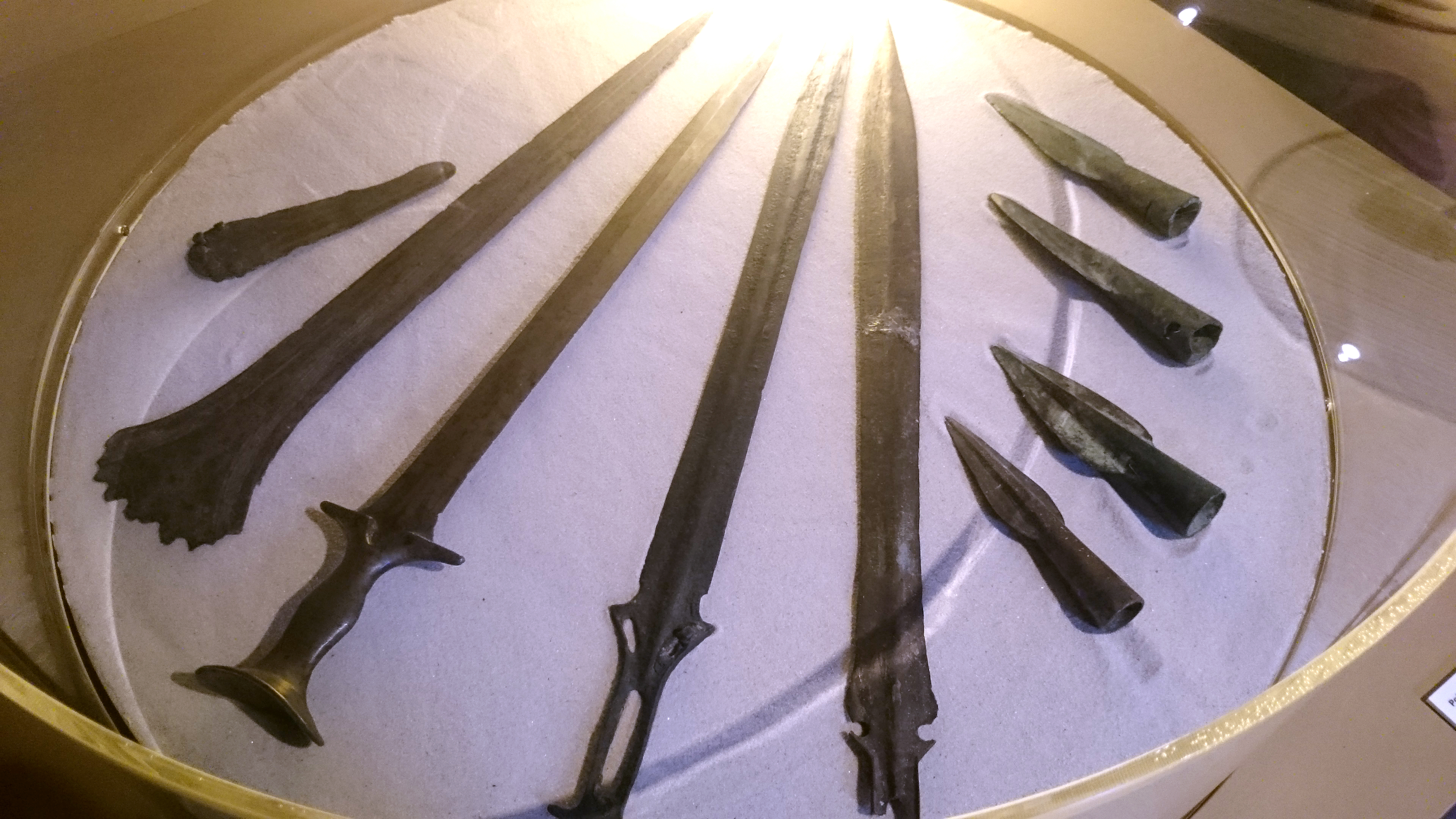
Bronze Age swords, France

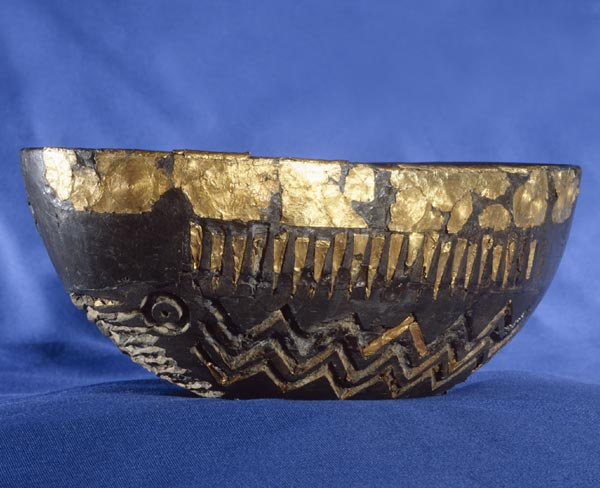
The Caergwrle Bowl, Wales, c. 1300 BC

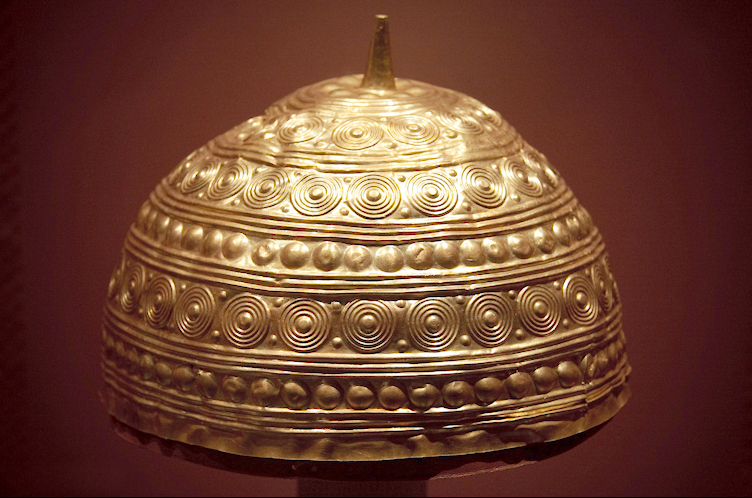
Casco de Leiro, Galicia, Spain

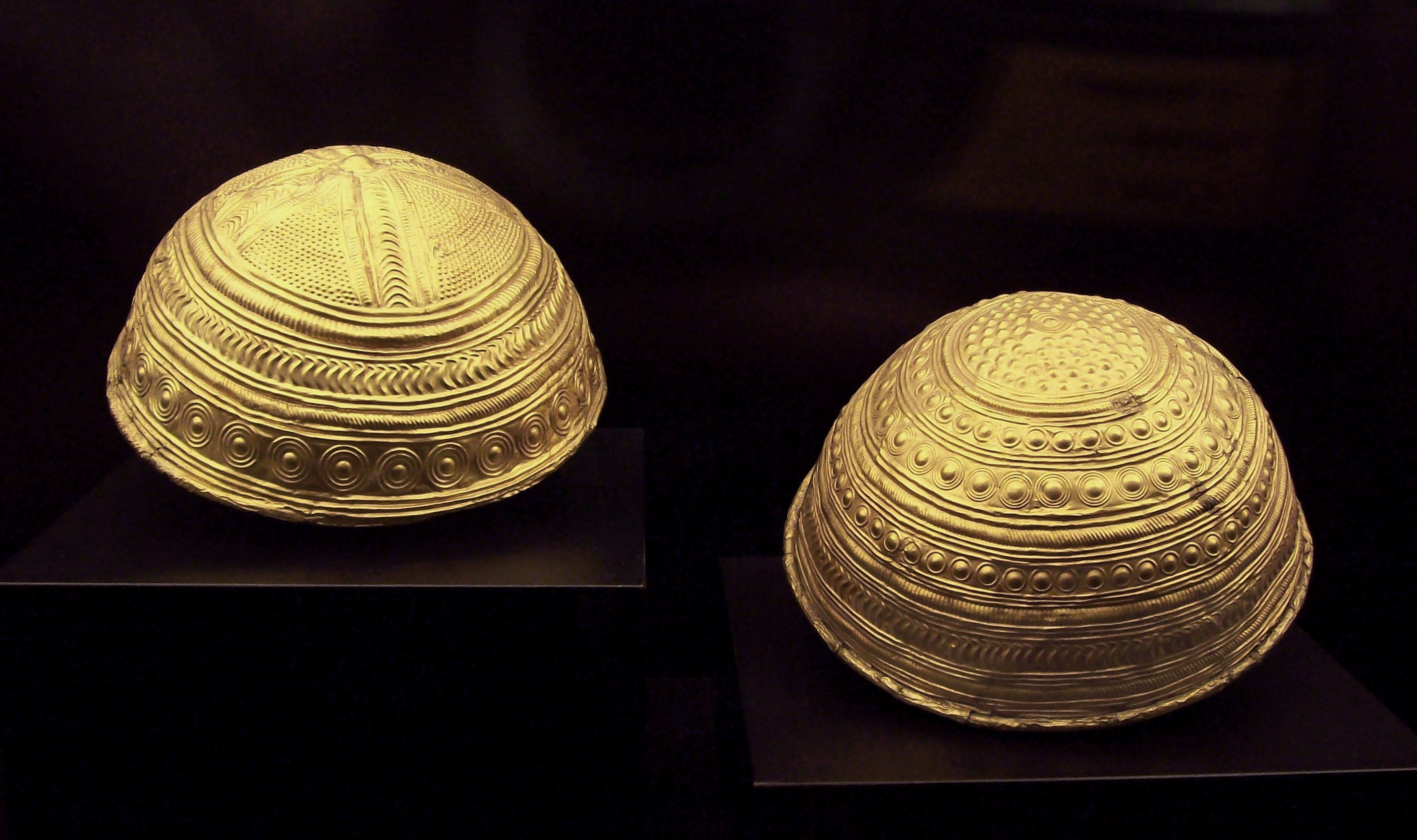
Gold bowls from Axtroki, Spain

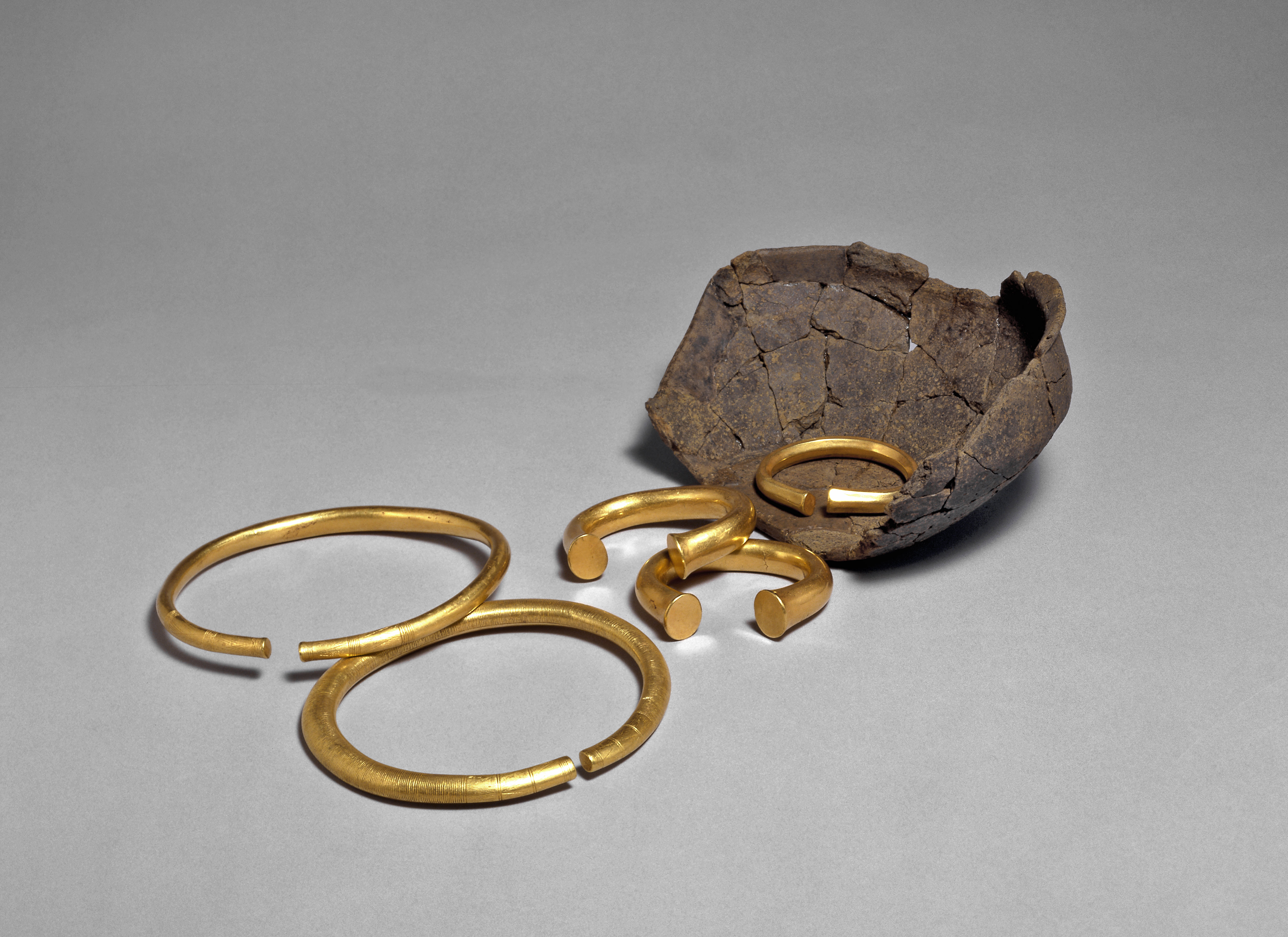
Gold bracelets and neckrings, England, 1150–750 BC

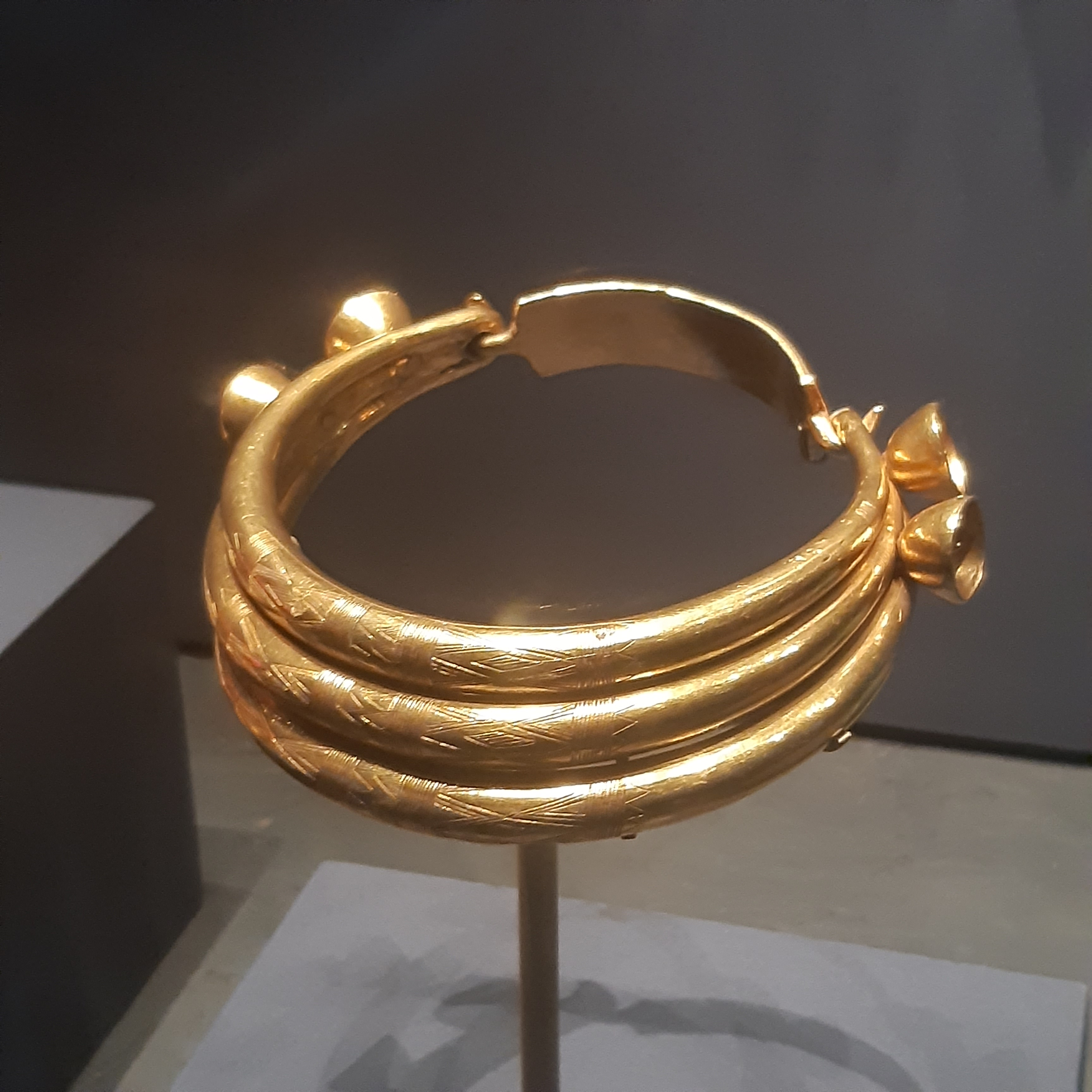
Sintra collar, Portugal, c. 10th century BC

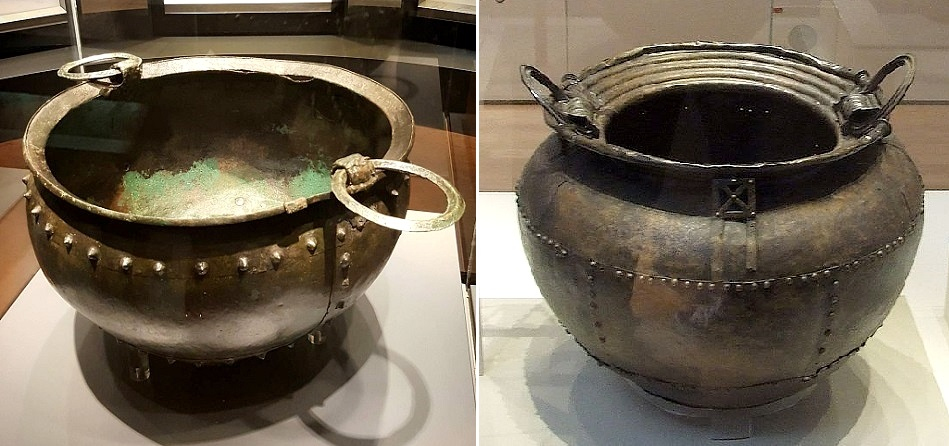
Bronze cauldrons. Left Cabárceno, Spain. Right Chiseldon, England.

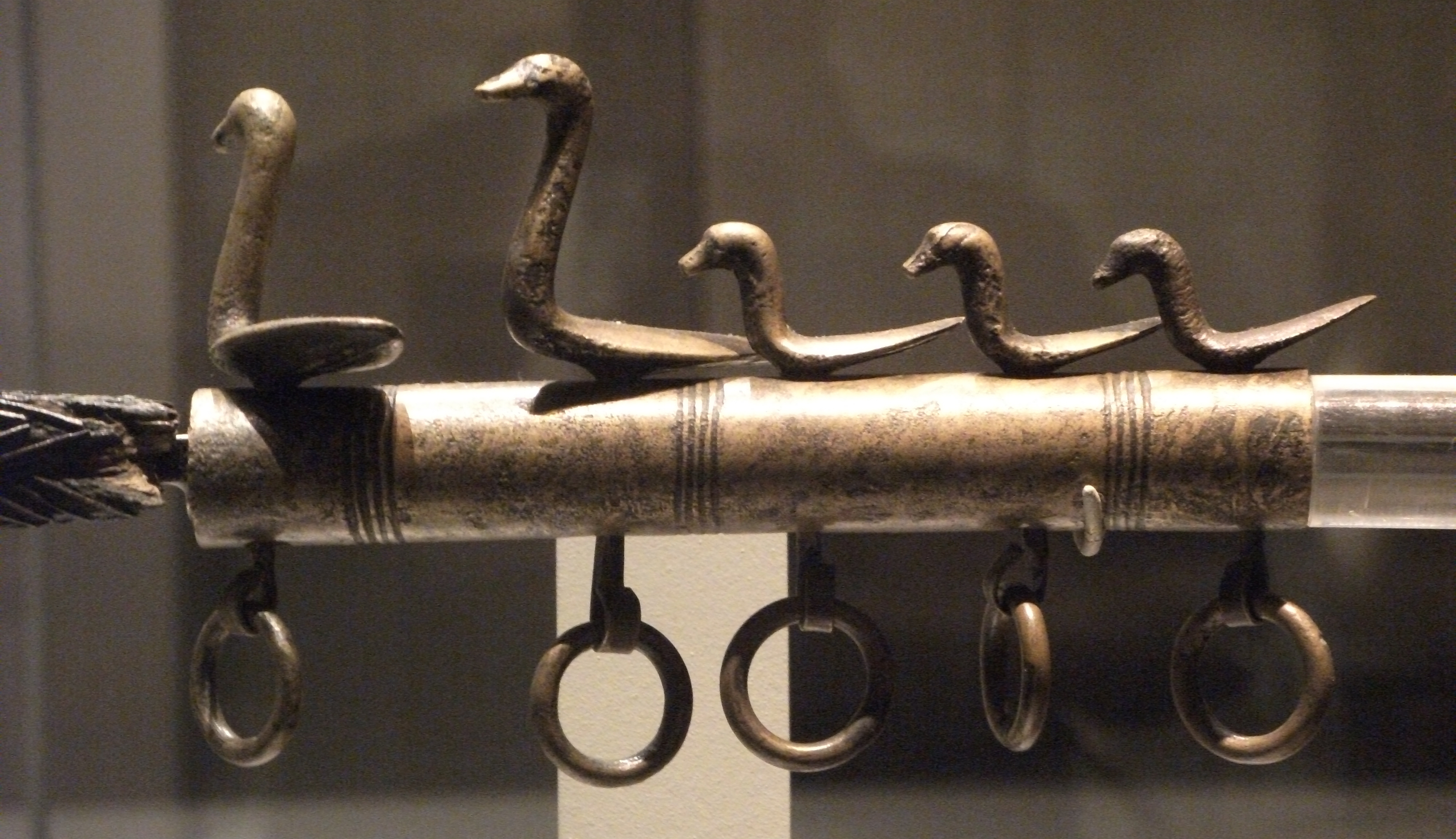
Detail of the Dunaverney flesh-hook, Ireland, 1000 BC

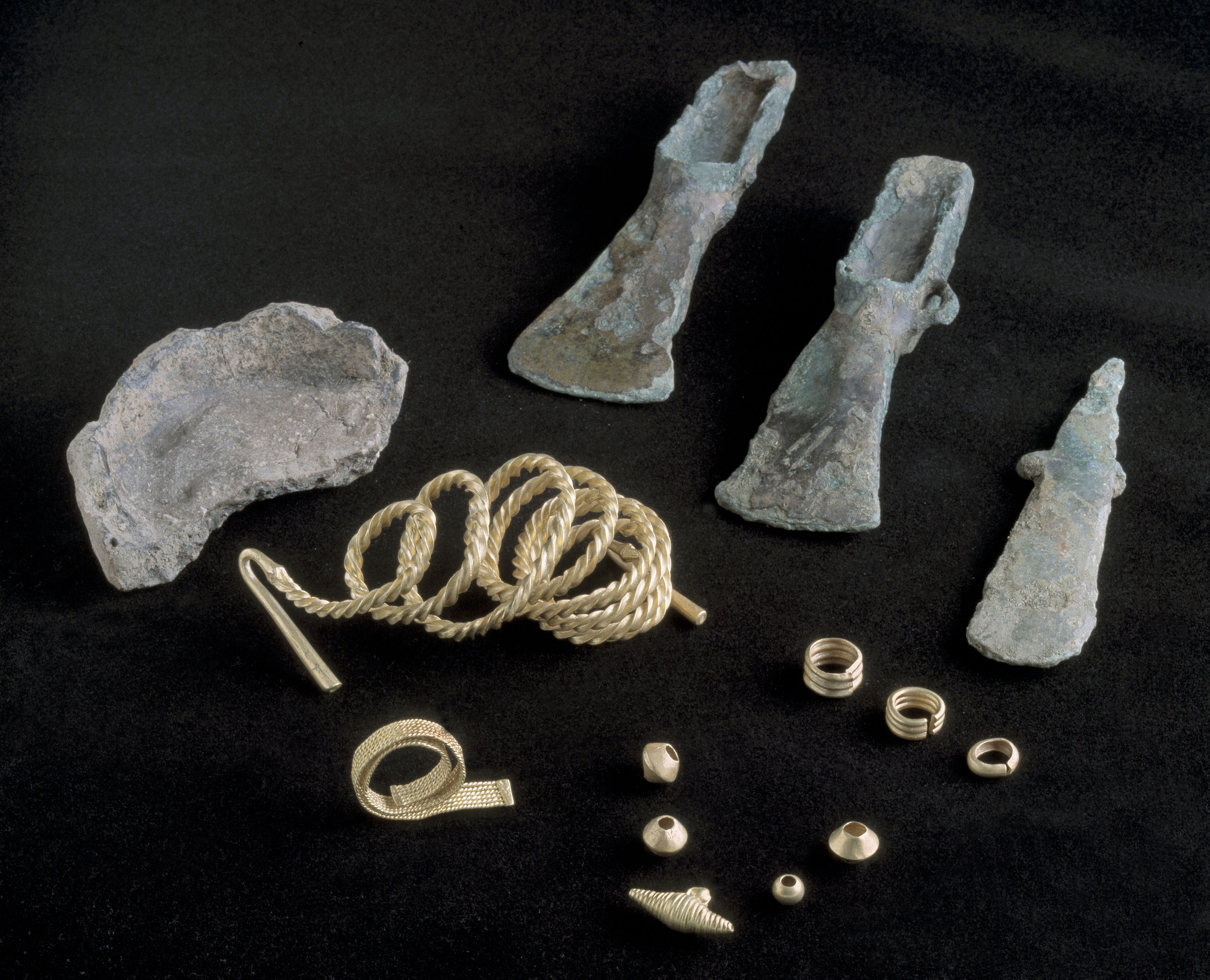
Gold and bronze hoard from Wrexham, Wales, 1300-1150 BC

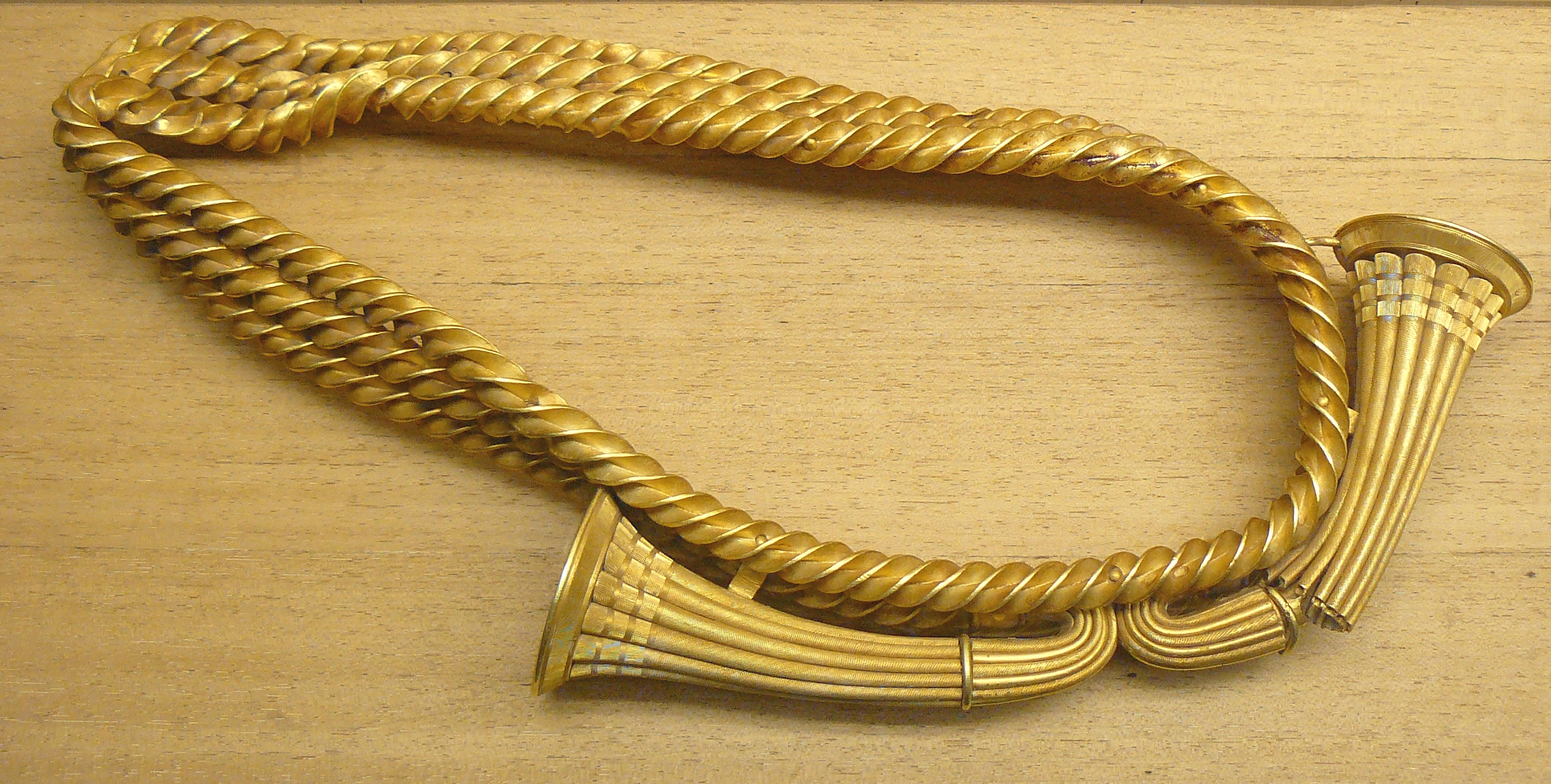
Gold torque or belt from Guînes, France, 1300-1150 BC

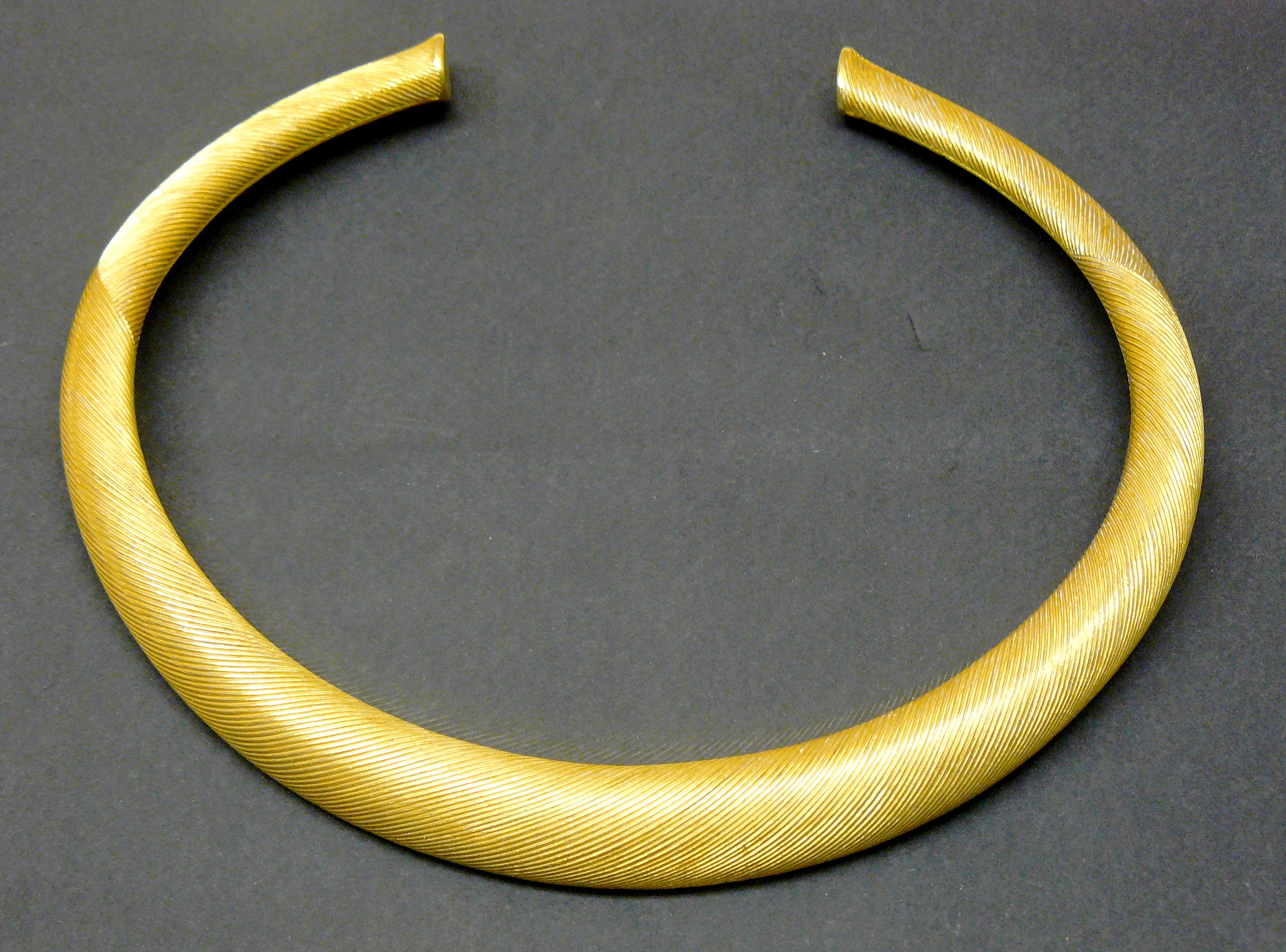
Gold torque from Guînes, Pas-de-Calais, France.

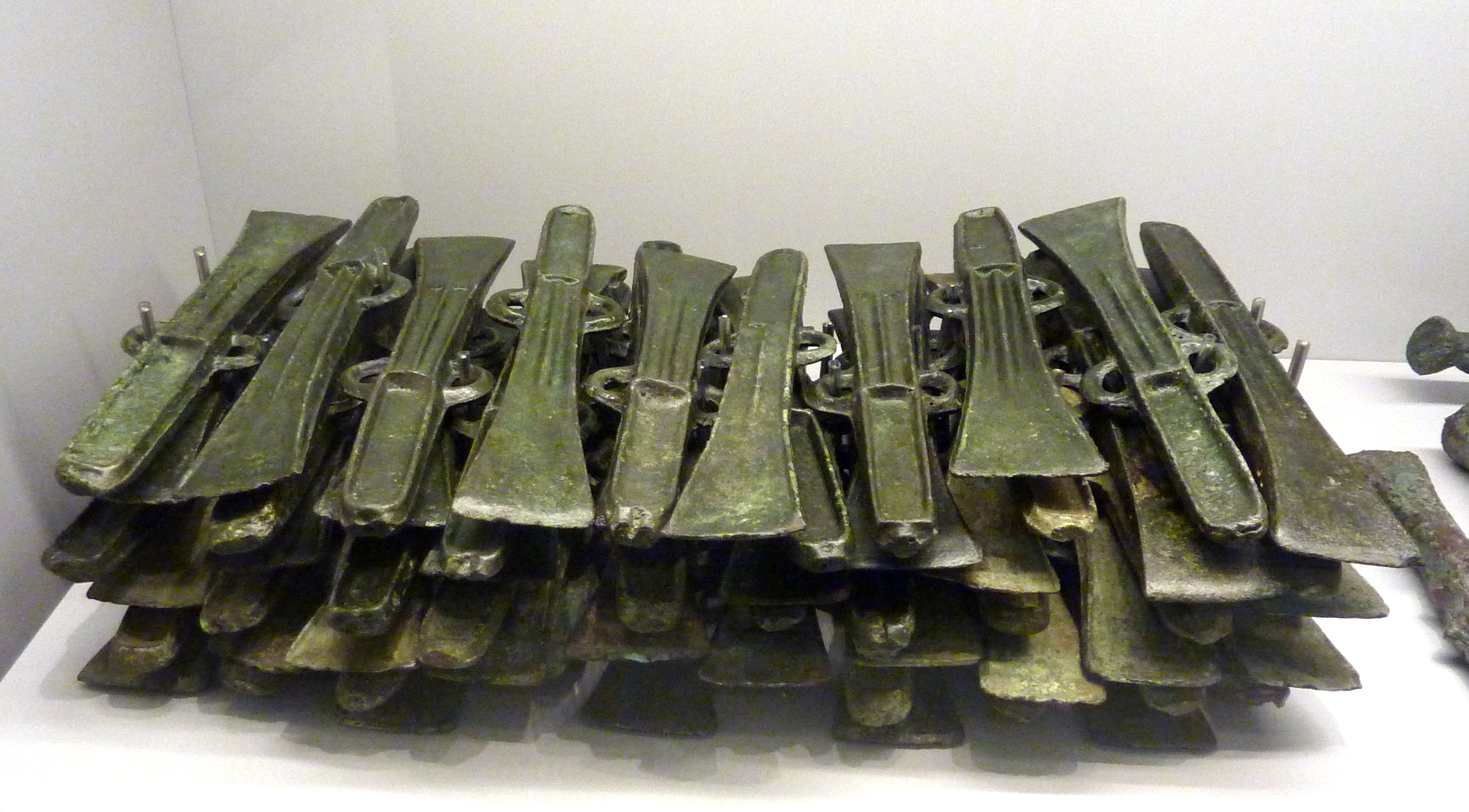
Deposito da Samieira, a hoard of Galician Bronze Age axes. Museo de Pontevedra

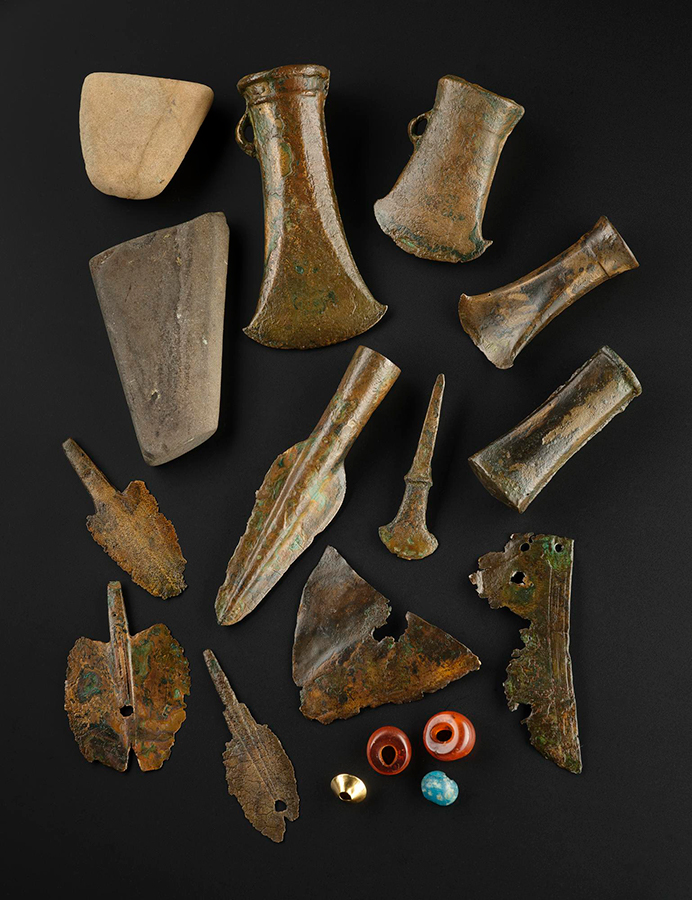
Adabrock Hoard, Scotland, c. 1000 BC

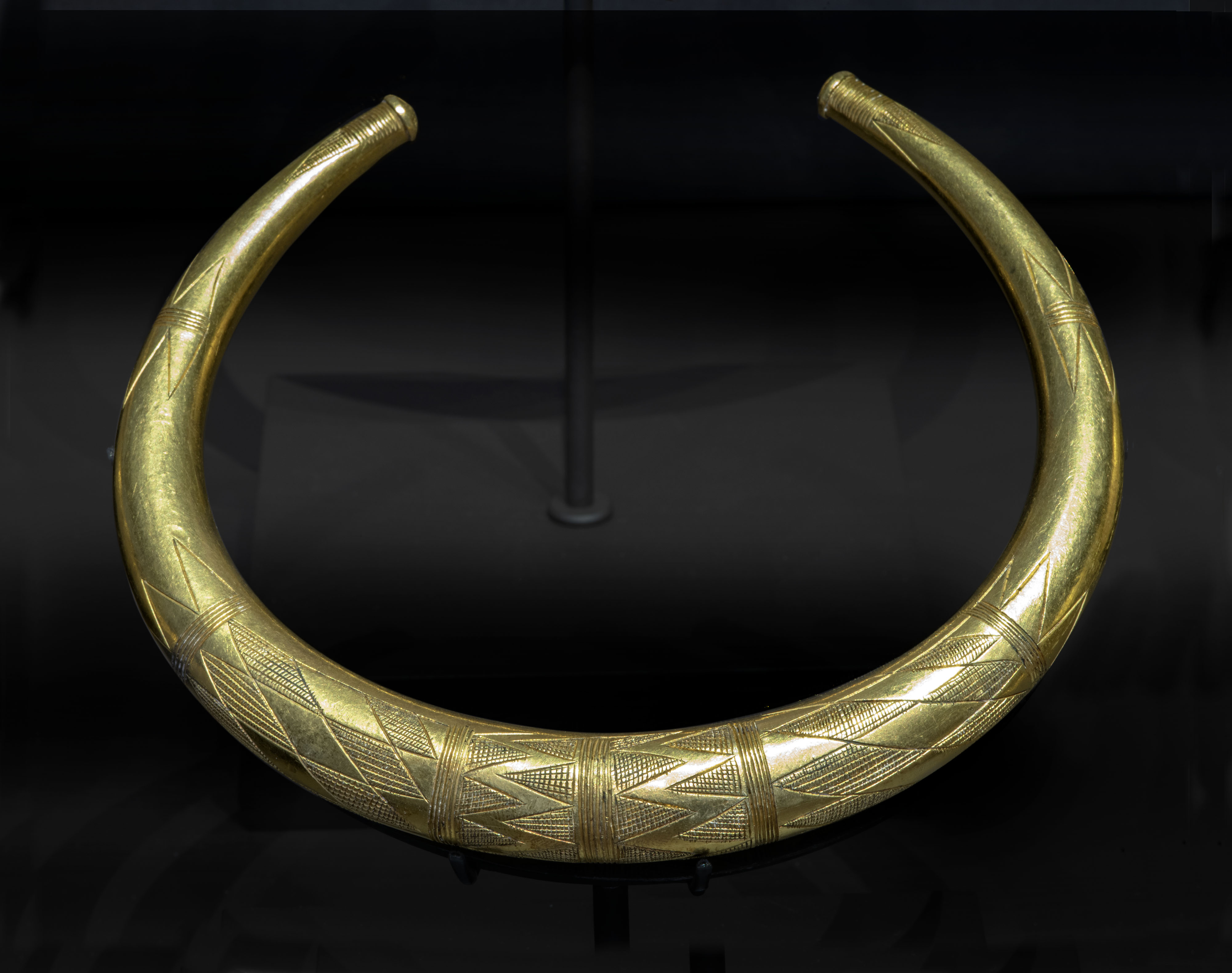
Gold torque from the Treasure of Berzocana, Extremadura, Spain

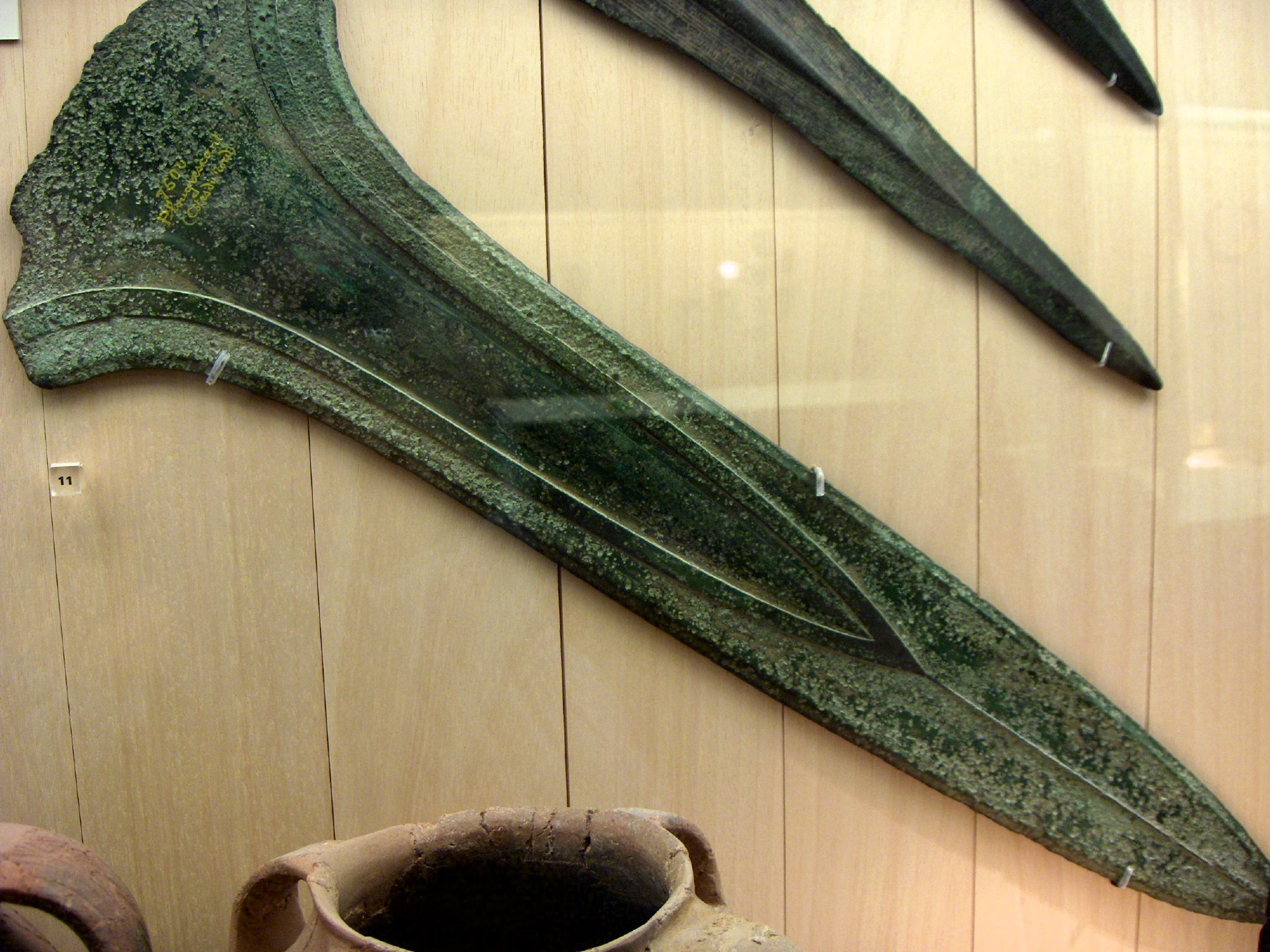
Ceremonial bronze dirk, France, c. 1300 BC

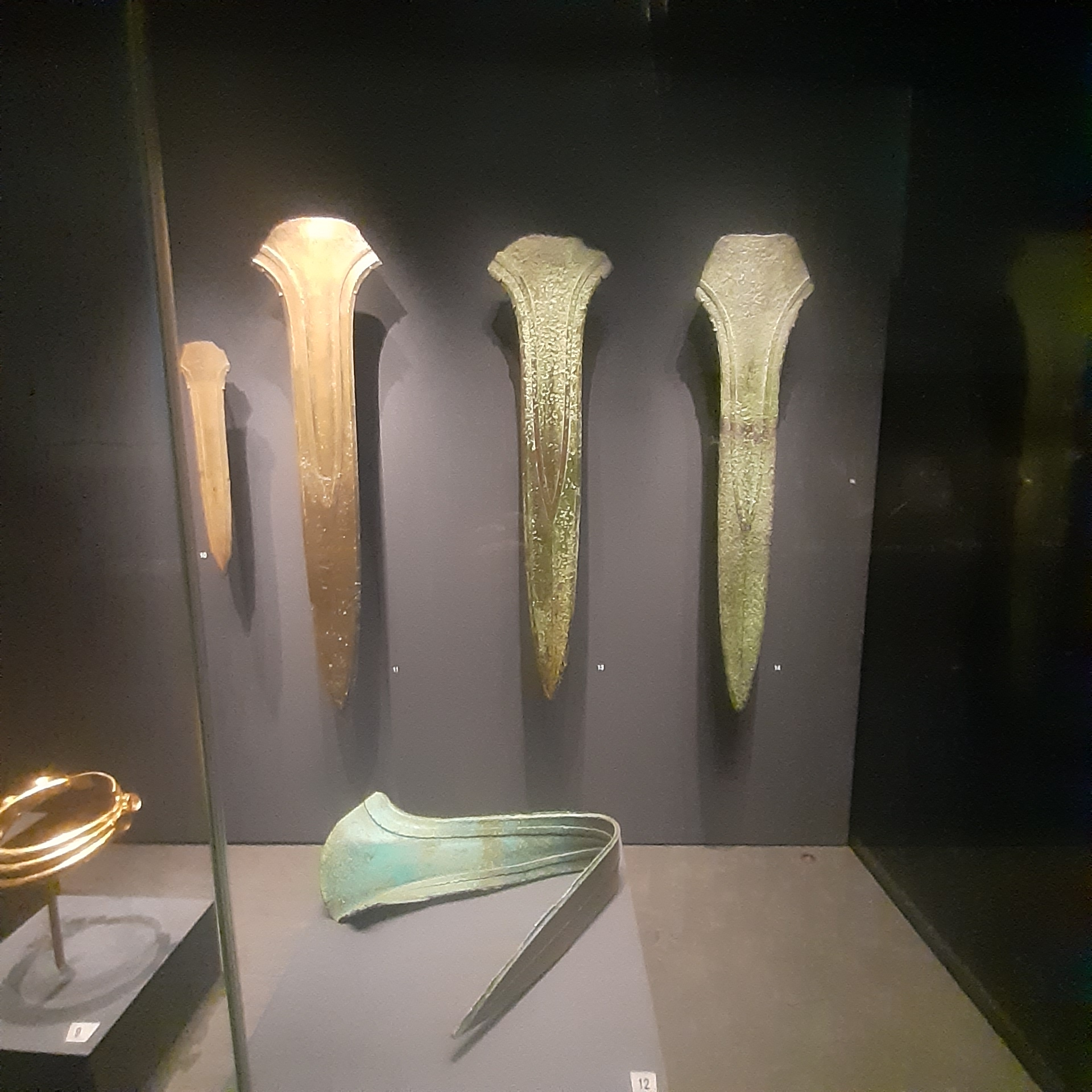
Dirks from England and France

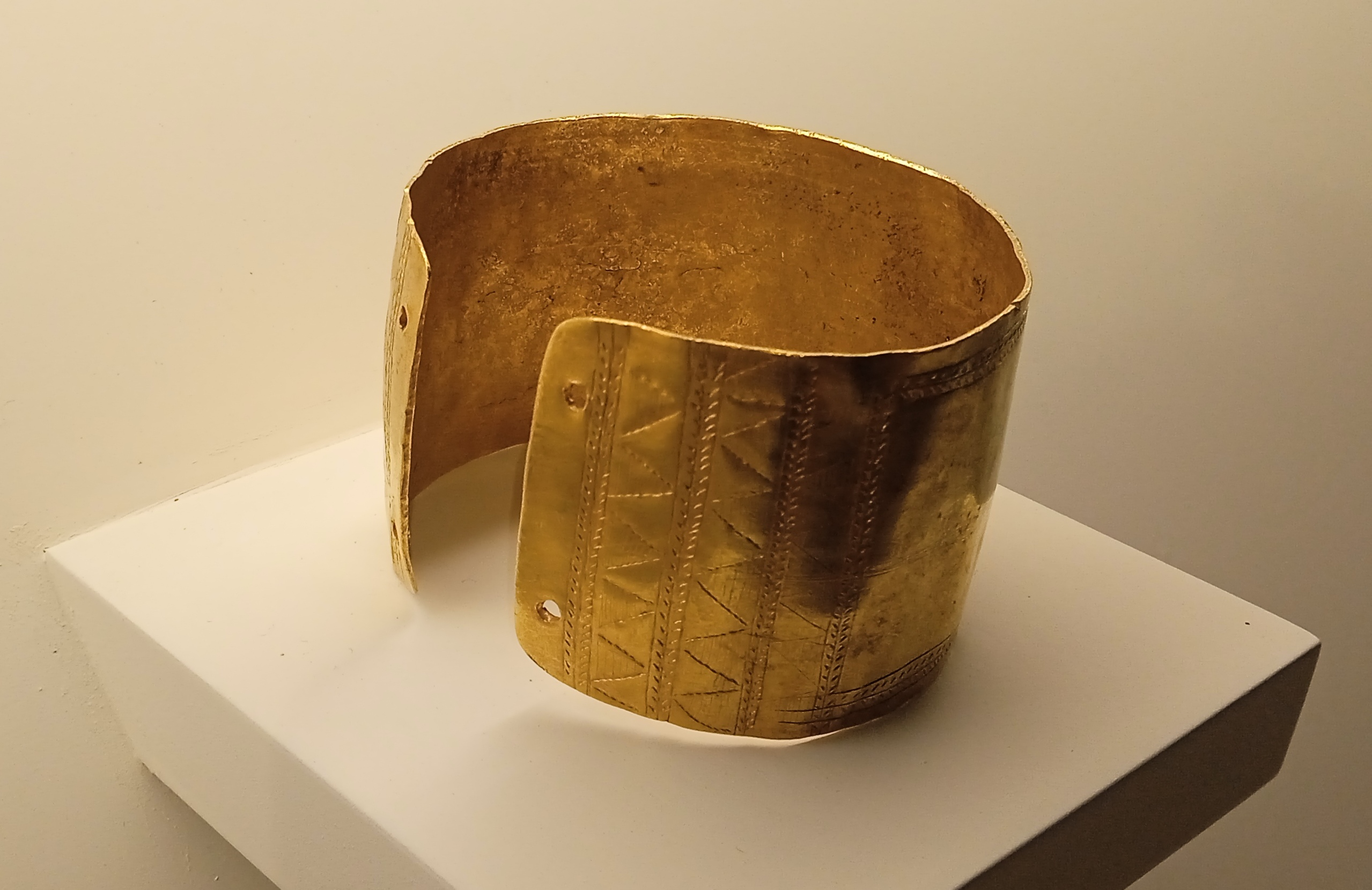
Bracelet from Urdiñeira, Spain

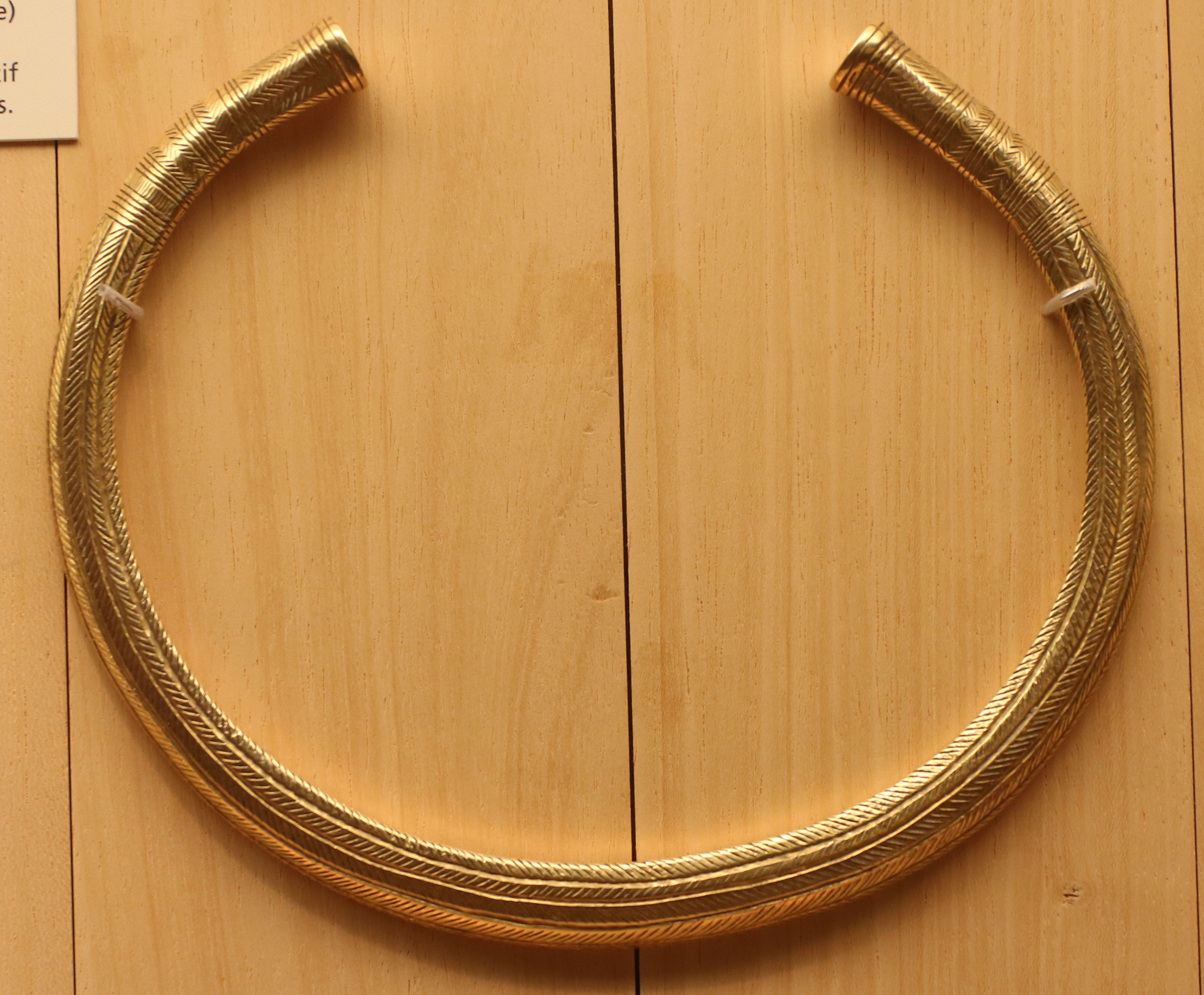
Gold torc, Saint-Jean-Trolimon, France

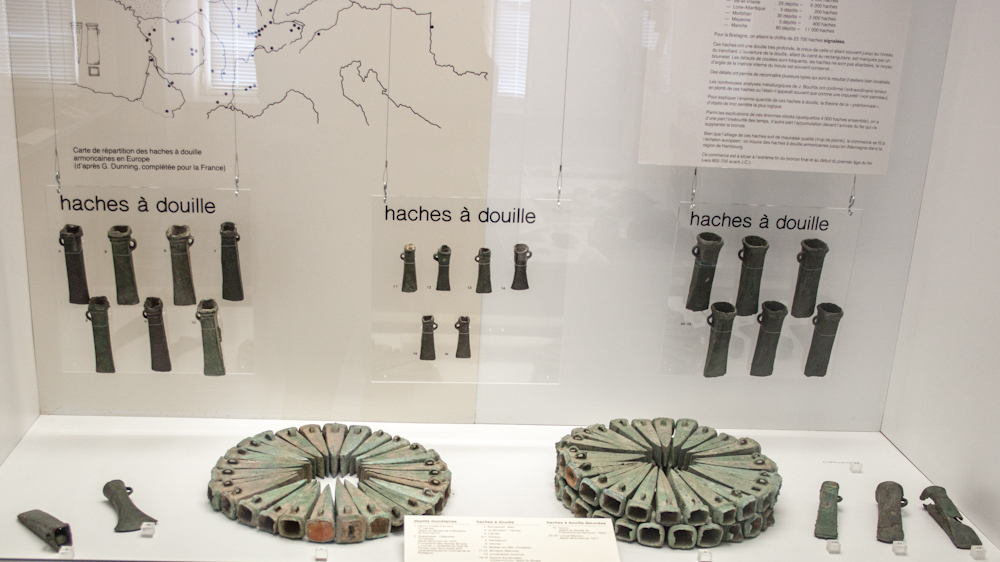
Bronze axes, France

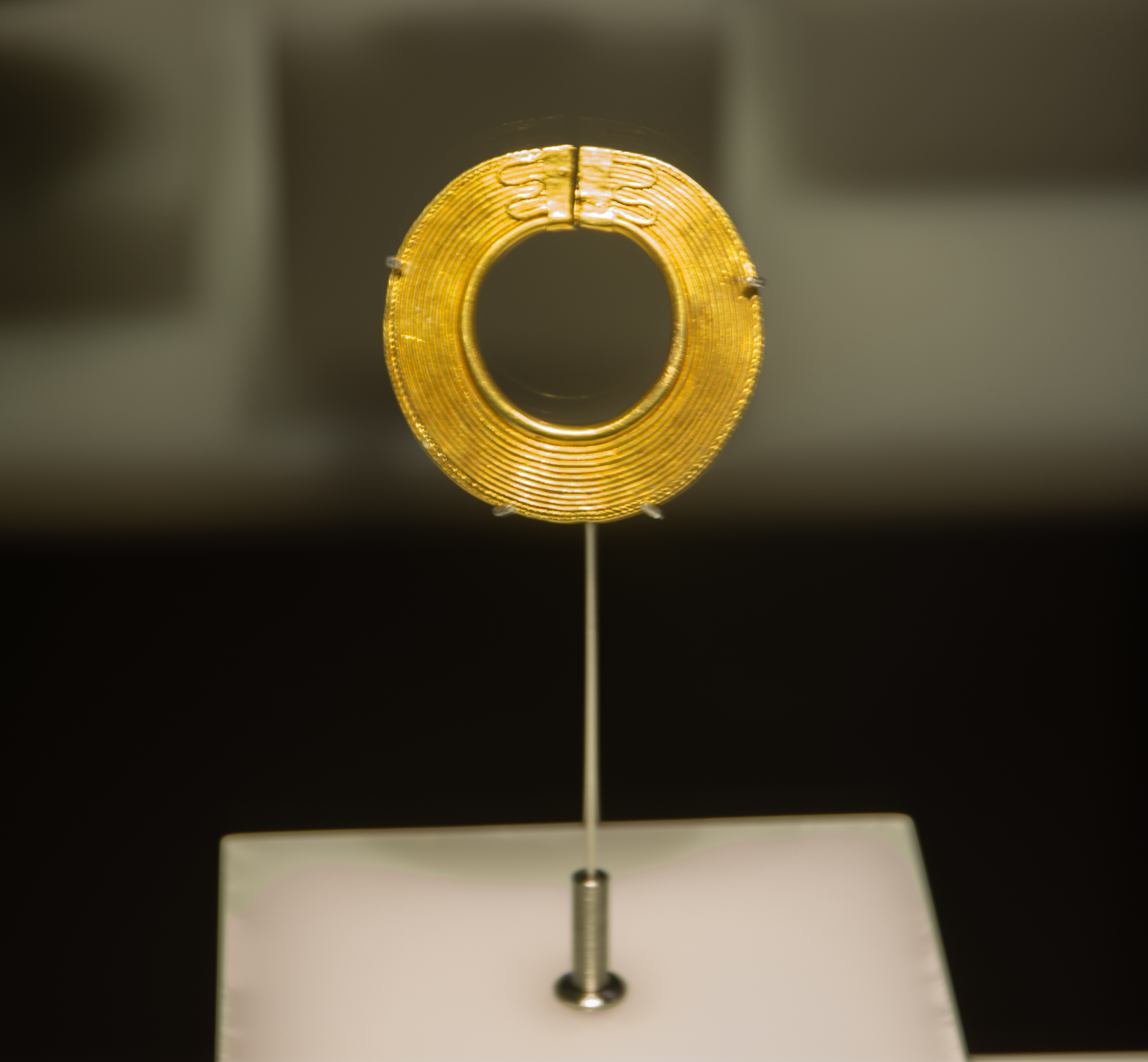
Gold disk/ring, Extremadura, Spain, c. 1000 BC

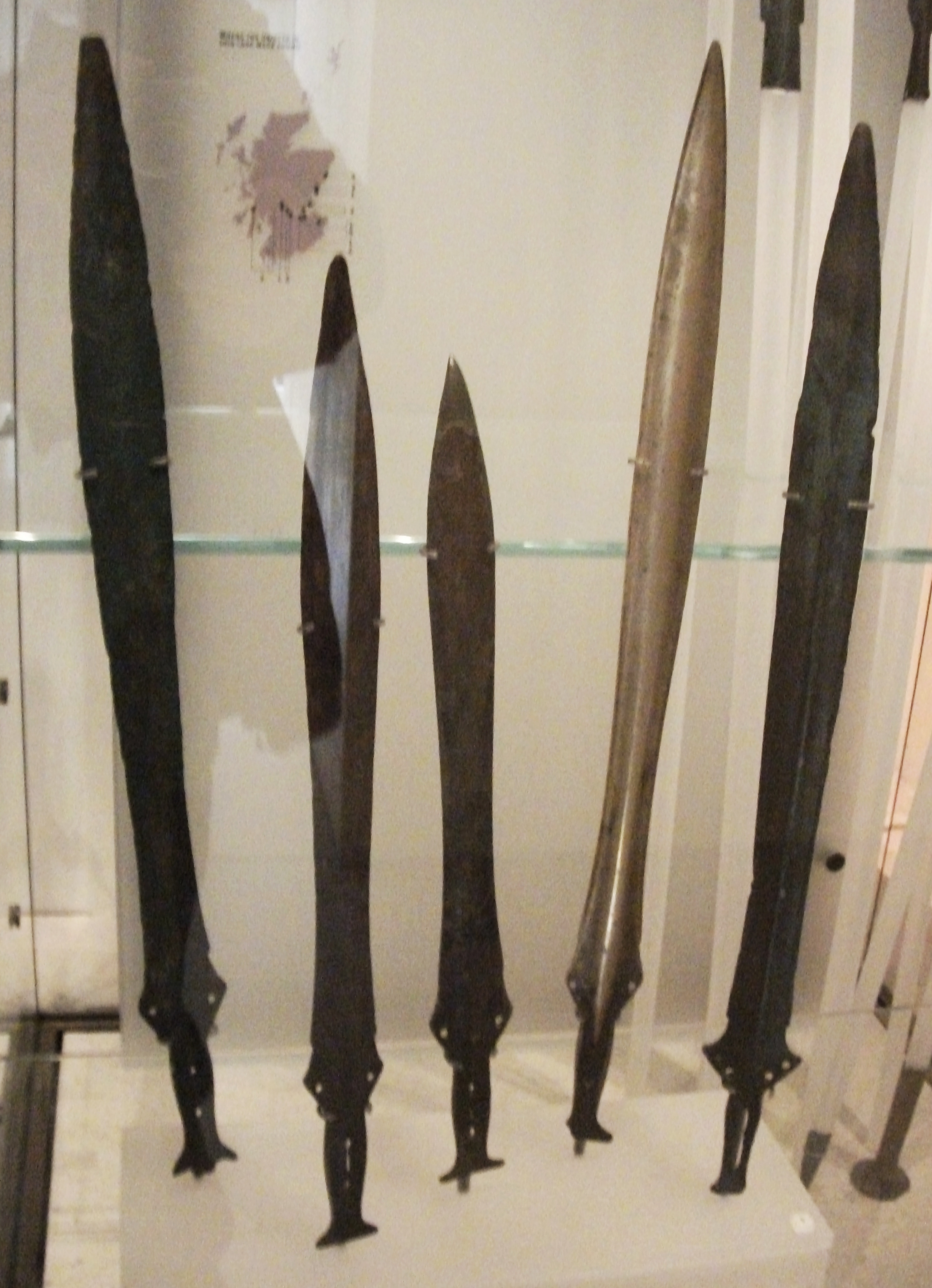
Bronze swords from Scotland, c. 1000 BC

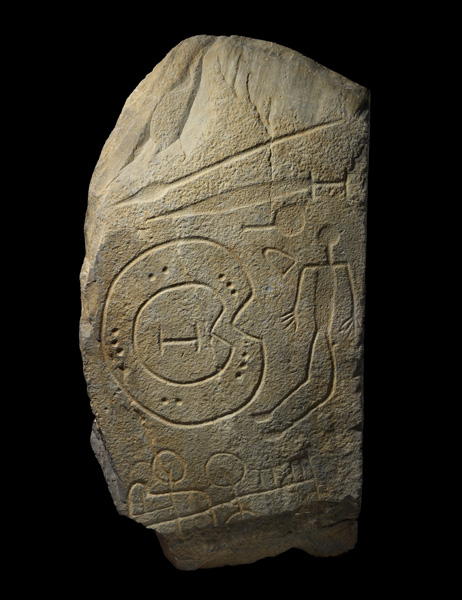
Stele of Solana de Cabañas, Spain.

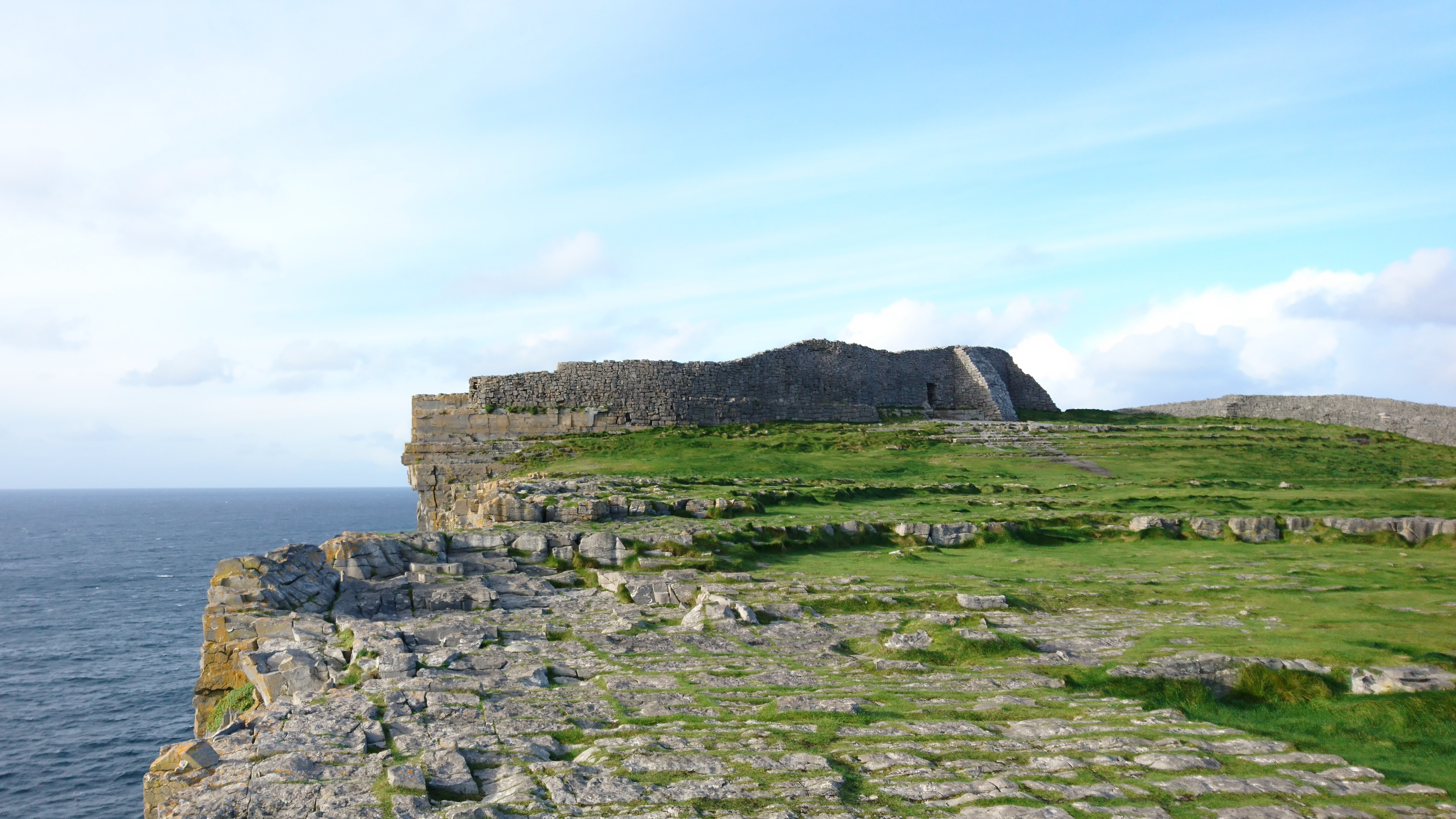
Dún Aonghasa hillfort, Ireland

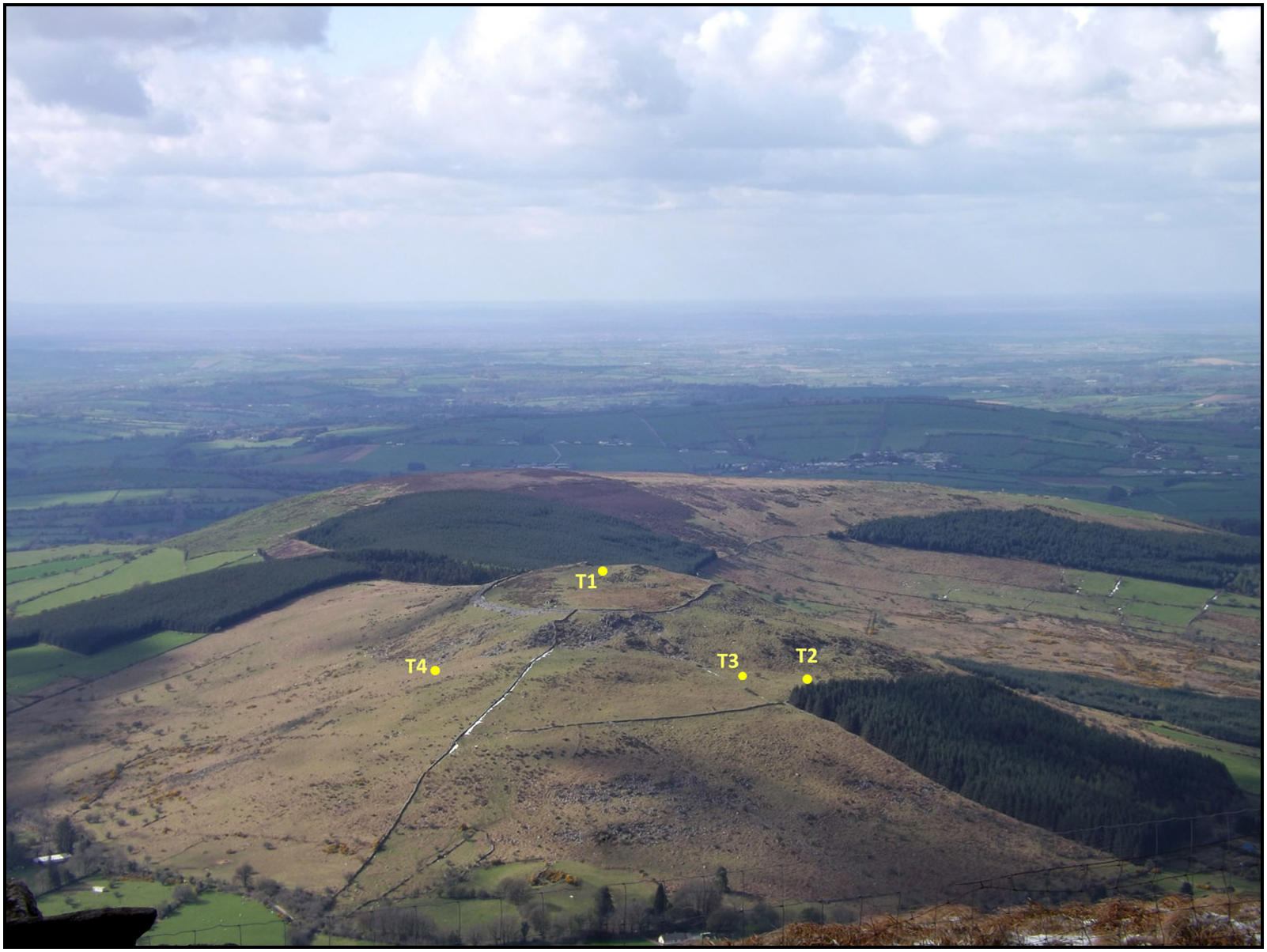
Brusselstown Ring hillfort, Ireland

== See also ==
- Magacela stele
- Bronze Age Europe
- Armorican Tumulus culture
- Argaric culture
- Bronze Age Britain
- Bronze Age Iberia
- Bronze Age France
- Cornish Bronze Age
- Urnfield culture
- Nordic Bronze Age
- Tumulus culture
- Unetice culture
