= Adabroc =

Village in the Outer Hebrides, Scotland

Coordinates: 58.483°N 6.237°W

Adabrock: Scottish Gaelic: Adabroc
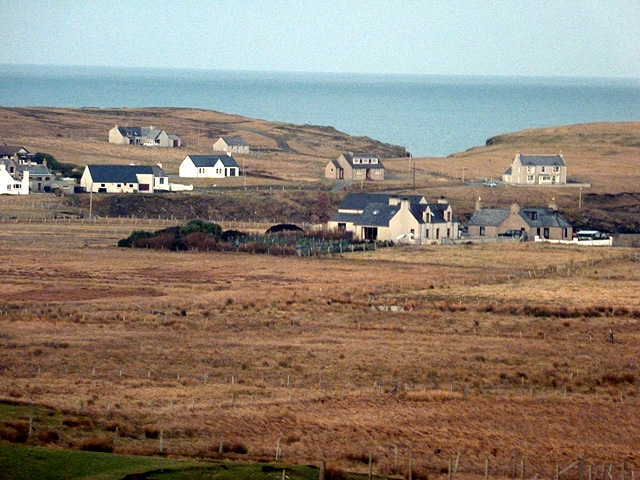
- Scattered habitation at Adabrock

- Location within the Outer Hebrides
- Language: Scottish Gaelic; English
- OS grid reference: NB530627
- Civil parish: Barvas
- Council area: Na h-Eileanan Siar
- Lieutenancy area: Western Isles
- Country: Scotland
- Sovereign state: United Kingdom
- Post town: ISLE OF LEWIS
- Postcode district: HS2
- Dialling code: 01851
- Police: Scotland
- Fire: Scottish
- Ambulance: Scottish
- UK Parliament: Na h-Eileanan an Iar
- Scottish Parliament: Na h-Eileanan an Iar

Adabrock (Scottish Gaelic: Adabroc), is a village in the area of Ness, Lewis, in the Outer Hebrides, Scotland. Adabrock is within the parish of Barvas, and is situated on the B8015 between Lionel and Eorodale. It is at the northern tip of Lewis, south-west of Port of Ness.

The Adabrock Hoard of late Bronze Age tools and weapons was discovered at Adabroc.
