= Lionel Lewis (disambiguation) =

Lionel Lewis may refer to:

- Lionel Lewis, a retired Singaporean footballer
- Lionel, Lewis, a village in Scotland

== See also ==
- Leona Lewis
