= Trebicia gens =

Ancient Roman family

The gens Trebicia was an obscure plebeian family at ancient Rome. No members of this gens are mentioned by Roman writers, but a number are known from inscriptions. Marcus Valerius Trebicius Decianus was magister of the Arval Brethren during the reign of Hadrian.

== Origin ==
The nomen Trebicius belongs to a class of gentilicia originally formed from cognomina ending in -ex or -icis, but later from other nomina, as -icius came to be regarded as a regular gentile-forming suffix.

== Praenomina ==
The chief praenomen of the Trebicii seems to have been Quintus, alongside which they occasionally employed Lucius, and probably also Titus and Aulus, all of which were common names throughout all periods of Roman history. Marcus may not have been a regular praenomen of this gens, as the only member known to have used it likely assumed the name as part of the nomenclature of a maternal ancestor.

== Members ==
This list includes abbreviated praenomina. For an explanation of this practice, see filiation.

- Quintus Trebicius Rusticelianus, together with Marcus Farranius Nicomedes dedicated a cinerarium at Tarquinii, dating between the late first century and the middle of the second, for Marcus Scribonius Nicoma.
- Lucius Trebicius L. f. Faustinus, buried at Contosolia in Hispania Baetica, at some point between the late first century and the end of the second. He was in his fifties, and his tomb might have been built by his son, perhaps named Titus Trebicius Faustus, although the reading is very uncertain.
- Trebicia Tertulla, the owner of an estate from which pottery was issued, found at Rome and Ostia in Latium, and likely dating from the time of Hadrian.
- Marcus Valerius Trebicius Decianus, (Note: As with other polyonymous Romans from this period, it is unclear whether his nomen was Valerius or Trebicius, as it was common for the Roman upper classes to combine the names of ancestors from both the paternal and maternal lines, arranging them in whatever order seemed most auspicious. As the Valeria gens was both ancient and illustrious, "Marcus Valerius", the name of a maternal ancestor, might have been prefixed to the name of an otherwise undistinguished "Trebicius Decianus", who through some combination of hard work and good fortune found himself master of the Arval Brethren. The best indication that this was the case is that he is sometimes referred to simply as "Trebicius Decianus". See Salomies, Adoptive and Polyonymous Nomenclature in the Roman Empire.) magister of the Arval Brethren during the reign of Hadrian.
- Aulus Trebicius Gaudinus, (Note: Gaudinus' praenomen is uncertain; the letter 'A' certainly precedes his nomen, but it might possibly stand for something other than a praenomen.) prefect of an ala, or cavalry wing, in the Legio I Parthica at Bostra in Arabia Petraea.

=== Undated Trebicii ===
- Trebicia, the owner of an estate from which pottery was issued, found at Fidenae in Latium and Firmum Picenum in Picenum; likely the same person as Trebicia Tertulla.
- Quintus Trebicius, named on pottery from Alsium in Etruria.
- Quintus Trebicius, named on pottery from Tarraco in Hispania Citerior.
- Trebicius Amaranthus, built a tomb at Rome for his wife, Trebicia Tyches.
- Trebicia Badia, buried at Pax Julia in Lusitania, aged sixty-five.
- Trebicia Melisse, buried at Rome.
- Quintus Trebicius Onesimus, buried at Rome, with a monument from his wife, Trebicia Philete.
- Trebicia Philete, dedicated a tomb at Rome for her husband, Quintus Trebicius Onesimus.
- Trebicia Saturnina, buried at Rome, together with her daughter, Valgia Isochrysa, aged thirteen years and eight months.
- Trebicia Tyches, buried at Rome, aged fifty-six years, ten months, and twenty-five days, in a tomb built by her husband, Trebicius Amaranthus.

== See also ==
- List of Roman gentes

== Bibliography ==
- Theodor Mommsen et alii, Corpus Inscriptionum Latinarum (The Body of Latin Inscriptions, abbreviated CIL), Berlin-Brandenburgische Akademie der Wissenschaften (1853–present).
- René Cagnat et alii, L'Année épigraphique (The Year in Epigraphy, abbreviated AE), Presses Universitaires de France (1888–present).
- George Davis Chase, "The Origin of Roman Praenomina", in Harvard Studies in Classical Philology, vol. VIII, pp. 103–184 (1897).
- Paul von Rohden, Elimar Klebs, & Hermann Dessau, Prosopographia Imperii Romani (The Prosopography of the Roman Empire, abbreviated PIR), Berlin (1898).
- Herbert Bloch, "The Roman Brick-stamps Not Published in Volume XV 1 of Corpus Inscriptionum Latinarum" in Harvard Studies in Classical Philology, vols. LVI, LVII (1947).
- José d'Encarnação, Inscrições Romanas do Conventus Pacensis: subsídios para o estudo da romanização (Roman Inscriptions from the Court of Pax: Subsidies for the Study of Romanization), Instituto de Arqueologia da Faculdade de Letras, Coimbra (1984).
- Olli Salomies, Adoptive and Polyonymous Nomenclature in the Roman Empire, Societas Scientiarum Fennica, Helsinki (1992).
