= Sintra Collar =

Bronze Age neck-ring found in Portugal

Sintra Gold Collar
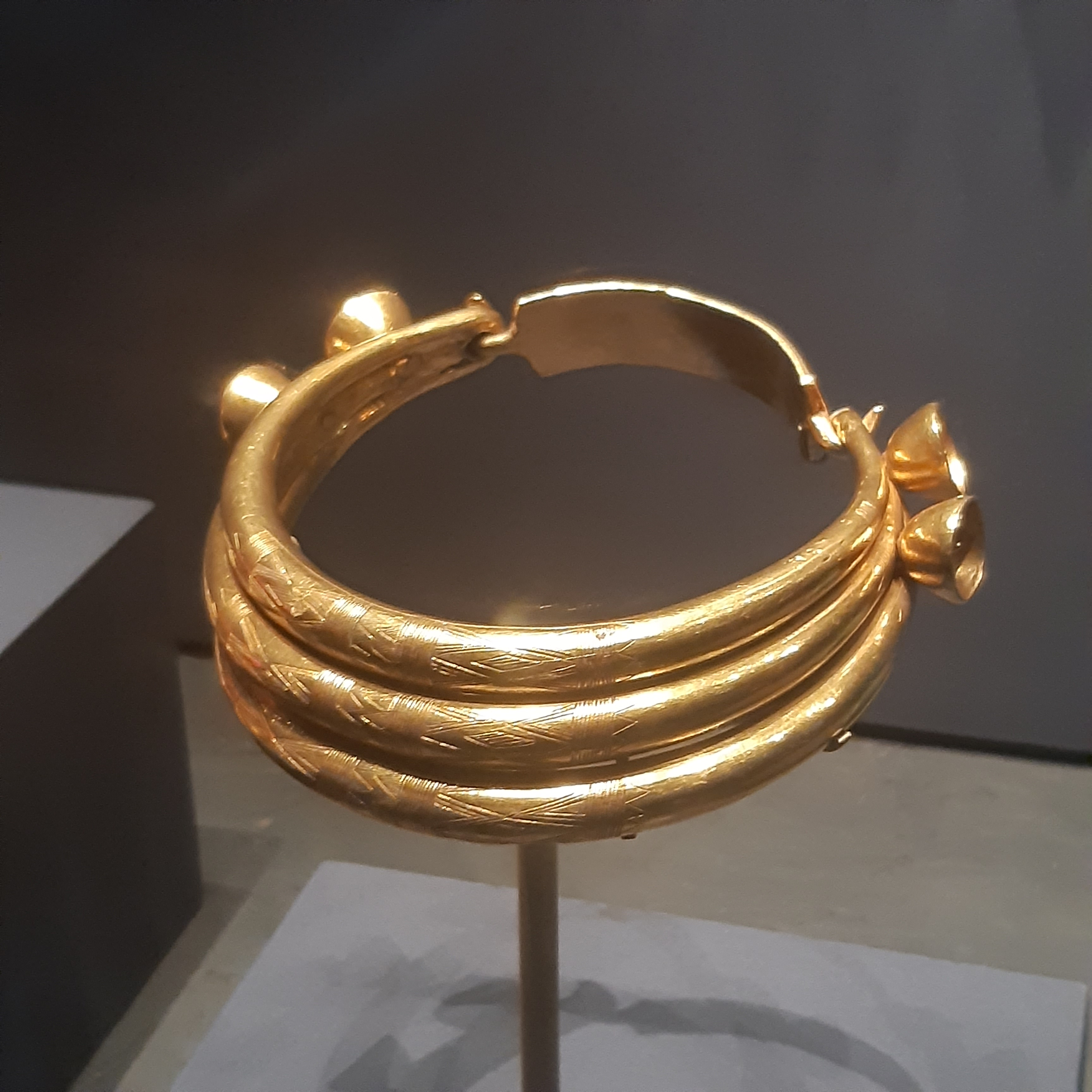
- Sintra Collar in the British Museum
- Material: Gold
- Size: Diameter 13.1cm
- Created: 10th-8th Century BC
- Present location: British Museum, London
- Identification: 1900,0727.1

The Sintra Collar (Portuguese: Xorca de Sintra) is a Bronze Age gold neck-ring found near Sintra in Portugal. Since 1900, it has been part of the British Museum's collection and has long been admired for the sophistication and geometric beauty of its design and technique.

== Description ==
The Sintra Collar is made of three thick round bars of graduated diameters which have been tapered and fused together at the ends. A ribbed link-plate is loosely attached by means of hooks at the end which pass through perforations. The front segments of the bars carry incised geometric decoration of parallel lines, divided into panels and fringed by a series of triangles (known as dog's tooth design). Attached at either end are two separately formed cups of gold, with an internal spike and moulding. The catch-plate is ornamented with five ribs, three of which have incised oblique lines.

== Discovery ==
The gold collar was allegedly found in 1878 by workers digging a ditch in a stone quarry in the Casal Amaro parish of Santa Maria, near Sintra in Portugal. According to reports at the time, the neck-ring was found with human bones in a grave. Soon after its discovery, the finds were purchased by the landowner. It was later bought by the London dealers John Hall Junior & Co, who sold it to the British Museum at the turn of the century.

== Importance ==
The Sintra Collar is one of a number of similar Bronze Age jewellery finds recorded along the Atlantic seaboard of Europe. Its decoration, for example, is paralleled in contemporary torcs found in southern Spain at sites such as Sagrajas near Badajoz. However, its complex design of tapering bars and catch-plate with accompanying hooks is unique.

== See also ==
- Bronze Age Iberia
