= North Tolsta =

Coordinates: 58.347°N 6.211°W

North Tolsta: Scottish Gaelic: Tolastadh bho Thuath
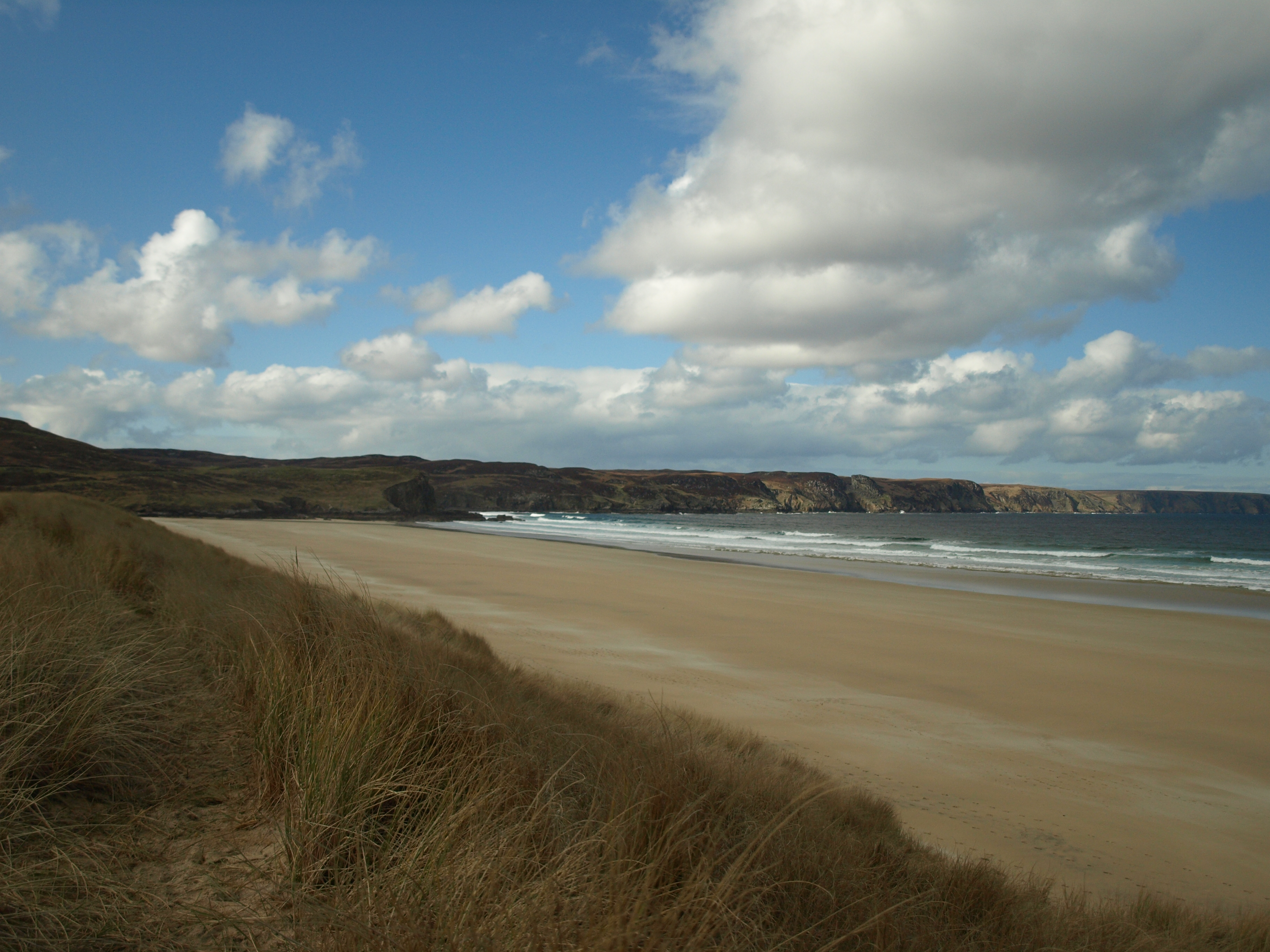
- Traigh Mhor Tolastadh

- Location within the Outer Hebrides
- Language: Scottish Gaelic; English
- OS grid reference: NB536475
- Civil parish: Stornoway
- Council area: Na h-Eileanan Siar
- Lieutenancy area: Western Isles
- Country: Scotland
- Sovereign state: United Kingdom
- Post town: ISLE OF LEWIS
- Postcode district: HS2
- Dialling code: 01851
- Police: Scotland
- Fire: Scottish
- Ambulance: Scottish
- UK Parliament: Na h-Eileanan an Iar
- Scottish Parliament: Na h-Eileanan an Iar

North Tolsta (Scottish Gaelic: Tolastadh bho Thuath) is a village in the Scottish Outer Hebrides, on the east side of the Isle of Lewis. North Tolsta is within the parish of Stornoway. Tolsta is notable for its long sandy beach Traigh Mhor At the end of Tolsta's long sandy beach there are five caves, only visitable during low tide. They are known locally as "The Caves of Life." The village of Bail' Ùr Tholastaidh (New Tolsta) is to the north. The village has a two churches and a post office and community shop ("Buth Tholastaidh").

== History ==
During World War I over 50% of the male population were in active service, 127 were mobilized. 50 of them died and left behind 19 widows, 54 fatherless children, and over 150 other dependants.

Formed in 2005, Tolsta Community Development Limited is a community interest company based in the village. The company operates a wind turbine at Glen Tolsta; the profits are used to benefit the Tolsta community.

The local primary school closed in Summer 2019.

== Heritage Sites ==
At the end of Gleann Tholastaidh is one of the few possible medieval castles on the Isle of Lewis, Caisteal a’ Mhorair (the Castle of the Big Man, or Nobleman) . The site was first recorded in 1874 in the Proceedings of the Society of Antiquaries by Peter Liddel. It was last surveyed in the early 2000s by The Severe Terrain Archaeological Campaign.

In the now drained loch at Osavat is a Crannog.

== Wildlife ==
Wildlife in the area includes golden eagles, the skua, the kittiwake and the herring gull. Seals, dolphins, porpoises and occasionally whales can be seen offshore.

== See also ==
- Lewis and Harris
- History of the Outer Hebrides
