= Adabrock Hoard =

Cache of Late Bronze Age artefacts from Scotland

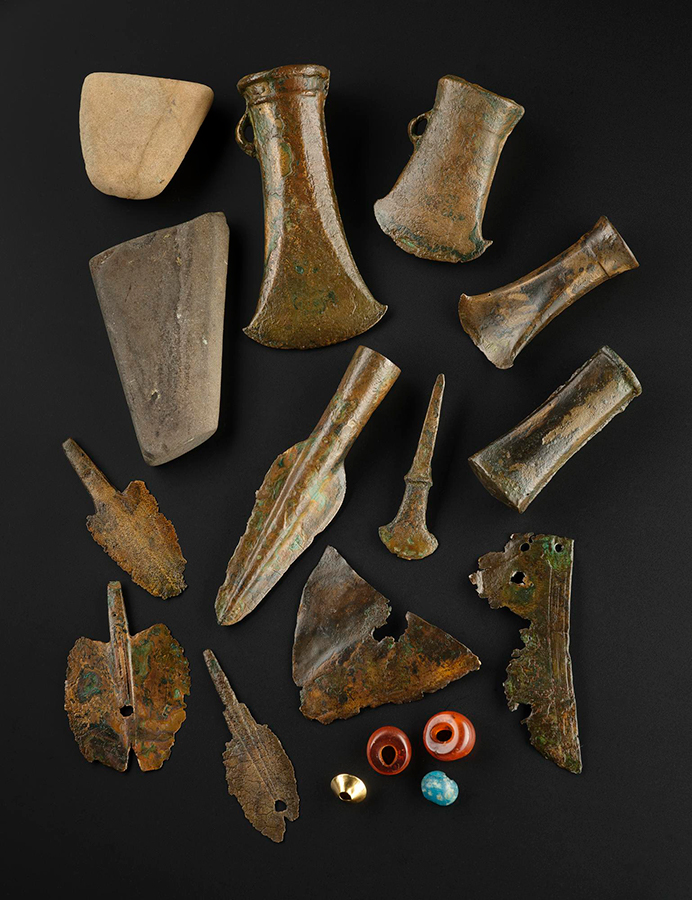
- Discovered: 1910
- Place: Isle of Lewis
- Present location: National Museum of Scotland

The Adabrock Hoard is a collection of Late Bronze Age artefacts deposited at Adabroc, Isle of Lewis, Scotland around 1000-800 BC.

== Description ==
The artefacts comprise two bronze socketed axeheads, a spearhead, a gouge, a hammer, three razors, as well as fragments of decorated bronze vessel, two whetstones and beads of glass, amber and gold.

== Discovery and excavation ==
The hoard was discovered in peat, at a depth of 9 to 10 feet (2.7 to 3.0 m), by Donald Murray in May 1910, while cutting peat for fuel. The hoard was excavated by the finder, who described the artefacts as being 'all in one group, the smaller things above and the heavier below'.

== Status ==
The hoard was acquired shortly after discovery by the National Museum of Antiquities of Scotland (now National Museums Scotland) and is accessioned as X.DQ 211-227.

== Gallery ==
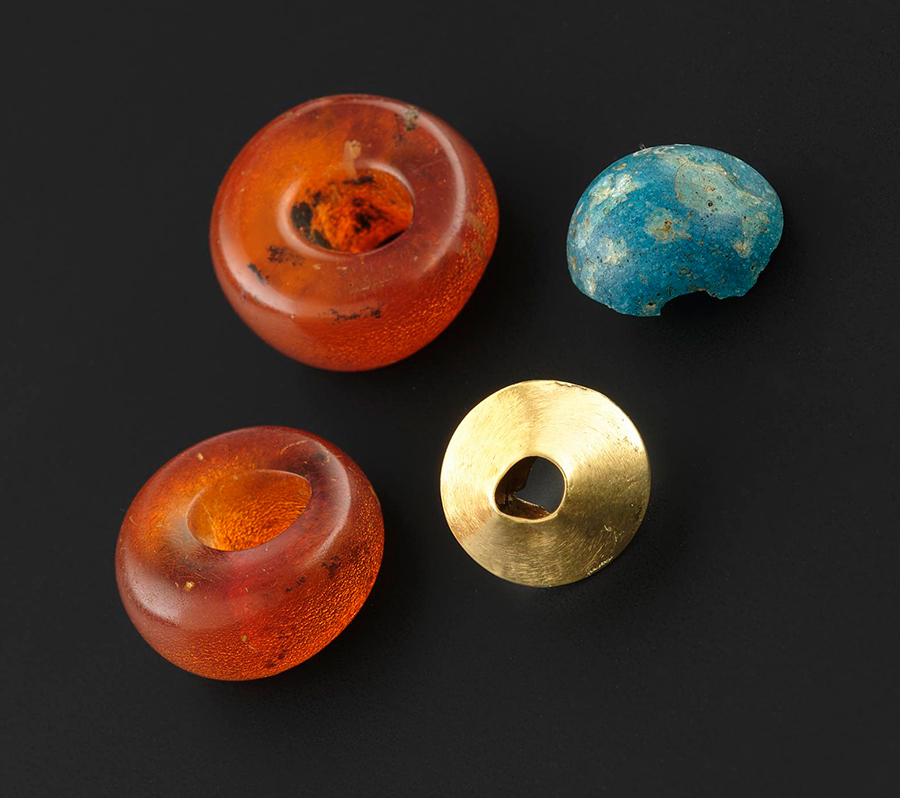
Bronze Age gold, amber and glass beads found in the Adabrock Hoard

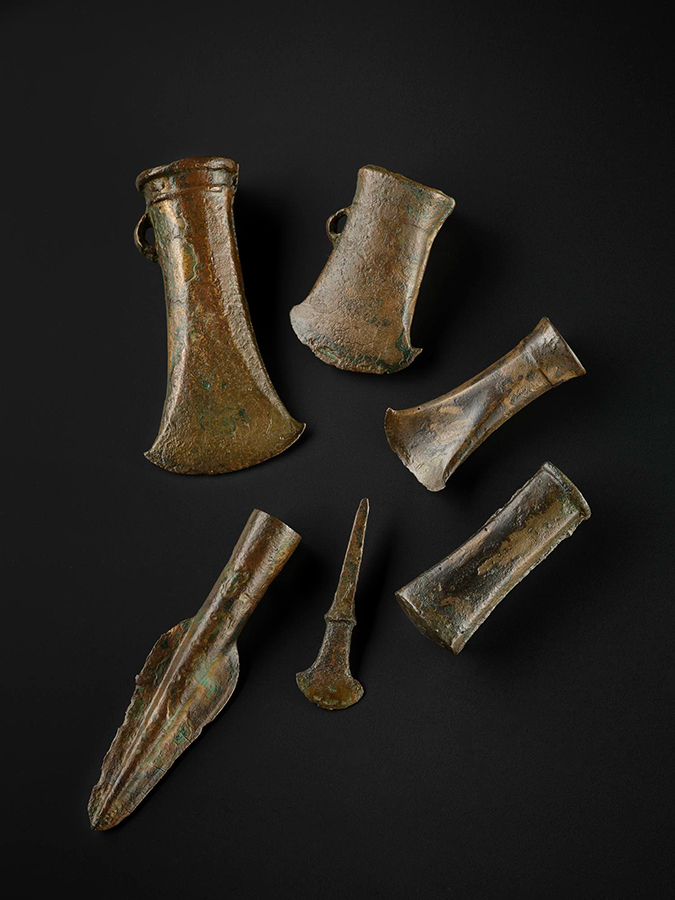
Bronze Age tools found in the Adabrock Hoard

== See also ==
- Bronze Age Britain
- Atlantic Bronze Age
- Bronze Age Europe

== External links section ==
- Canmore link
