= New Tolsta =

Coordinates: 58.356°N 6.221°W

New Tolsta: Scottish Gaelic: Baile Ùr Tholastaidh
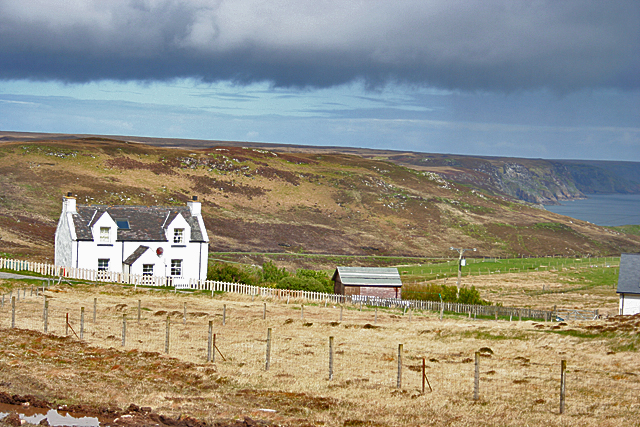
- A traditional house at New Tolsta

- Location within the Outer Hebrides
- Language: Scottish Gaelic; English
- OS grid reference: NB531485
- Civil parish: Stornoway
- Council area: Na h-Eileanan Siar
- Lieutenancy area: Western Isles
- Country: Scotland
- Sovereign state: United Kingdom
- Post town: ISLE OF LEWIS
- Postcode district: HS2
- Dialling code: 01851
- Police: Scotland
- Fire: Scottish
- Ambulance: Scottish
- UK Parliament: Na h-Eileanan an Iar
- Scottish Parliament: Na h-Eileanan an Iar

New Tolsta (Scottish Gaelic: Baile Ùr Tholastaidh) is a village on the Isle of Lewis in the Outer Hebrides, Scotland. New Tolsta is within the parish of Stornoway, and it lies to the north of North Tolsta, at the end of the B895 road.

To the north of the village lies the beginning of a road that was planned to cross the moor and meet the road end in the village of Skigersta in Ness. The uncompleted project is known locally as "the road to nowhere".
