= Eorodale =

Coordinates: 58.480°N 6.227°W

Eorodale: Scottish Gaelic: Eòrodal
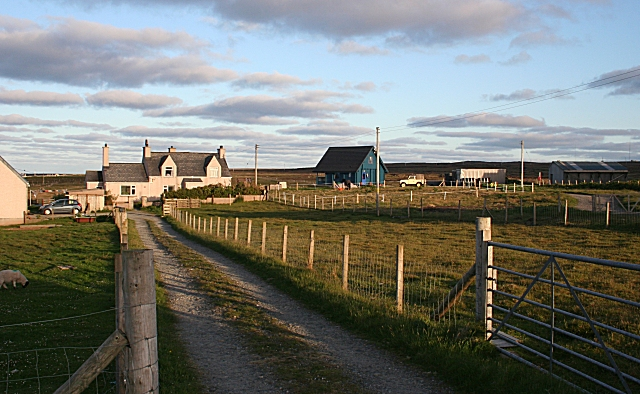
- Houses adjoining a lane at Eorodale

- Location within the Outer Hebrides
- Language: Scottish Gaelic; English
- OS grid reference: NB536623
- Civil parish: Barvas
- Council area: Na h-Eileanan Siar
- Lieutenancy area: Western Isles
- Country: Scotland
- Sovereign state: United Kingdom
- Post town: ISLE OF LEWIS
- Postcode district: HS2
- Dialling code: 01851
- Police: Scotland
- Fire: Scottish
- Ambulance: Scottish
- UK Parliament: Na h-Eileanan an Iar
- Scottish Parliament: Na h-Eileanan an Iar

Eorodale (Scottish Gaelic: Eòradal) is a settlement in the community of Ness, on Lewis, in the Outer Hebrides, Scotland. Eorodale is within the parish of Barvas, and is situated on the B8015 between Lionel and Skigersta.
