= Lionel, Lewis =

Coordinates: 58.489°N 6.242°W

Lionel: Scottish Gaelic: Lìonal
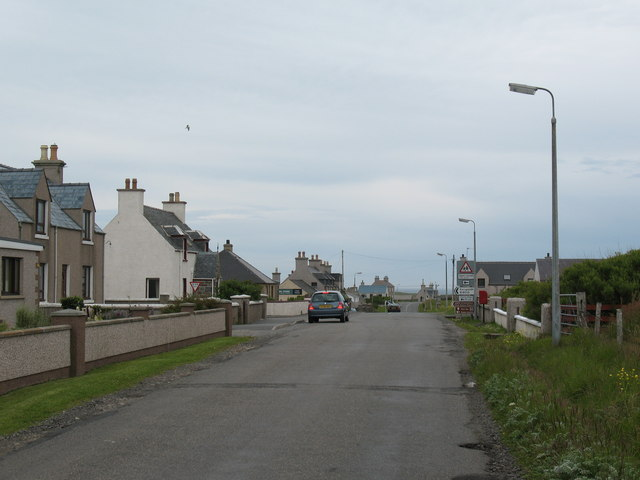
- The A857 at Lional

- Location within the Outer Hebrides
- Language: Scottish Gaelic; English
- OS grid reference: NB528634
- Civil parish: Barvas
- Council area: Na h-Eileanan Siar
- Lieutenancy area: Western Isles
- Country: Scotland
- Sovereign state: United Kingdom
- Post town: STORNOWAY
- Postcode district: HS2
- Dialling code: 01851
- Police: Scotland
- Fire: Scottish
- Ambulance: Scottish
- UK Parliament: Na h-Eileanan an Iar
- Scottish Parliament: Na h-Eileanan an Iar

Lionel (Scottish Gaelic: Lìonal) is a village in the Ness area of the Isle of Lewis. Lionel is within the parish of Barvas. Lionel is situated near the northern end of the A857, at the junctions with the B8013 to Eoropie and the B8015 to Eorodale and Skigersta.

== See also ==
- Lewis and Harris
- History of the Outer Hebrides
