= Skigersta =

Coordinates: 58.474°N 6.214°W

Skigersta: Scottish Gaelic: Sgiogarstaigh
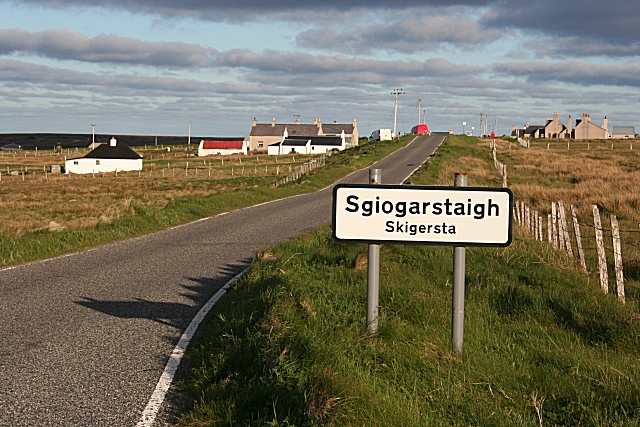
- The road into Skigersta

- Location within the Outer Hebrides
- Language: Scottish Gaelic; English
- OS grid reference: NB543616
- Civil parish: Barvas
- Council area: Na h-Eileanan Siar
- Lieutenancy area: Western Isles
- Country: Scotland
- Sovereign state: United Kingdom
- Post town: ISLE OF LEWIS
- Postcode district: HS2
- Dialling code: 01851
- Police: Scotland
- Fire: Scottish
- Ambulance: Scottish
- UK Parliament: Na h-Eileanan an Iar
- Scottish Parliament: Na h-Eileanan an Iar

Skigersta (Scottish Gaelic: Sgiogarstaigh) is a village to the south east of Ness on the Isle of Lewis, in the Outer Hebrides, Scotland. It is the easternmost settlement in the Ness district and is 5km (3miles) southeast of the Butt of Lewis. Skigersta is situated within the parish of Barvas. There is a quay built in 1901 and a shingle beach. The area of Skigersta near the shore is called 'Lathamor'. To the south of Skigersta the moor begins and the road turns into a peat track; there are sheilings on the moor at Cuisiadar and if you follow the moor further south you reach the road at New Tolsta.

== History ==
Skigersta was a location for fish curing in the 19th century with the ruins of the curing bothies still visible next to the river. It benefited from a man-made channel in the shoreline which allowed easier access for the boats. A cargo ship, the Dunalistair, was wrecked off Skigersta in 1885, in fog.

== Creag Dubh (the black crag) ==
Located to the southeast of Skigersta is a small promontory with a cairn and possible roundhouse remains. When archaeologists recorded it in the 2000s they feared that erosion would eliminate the site in the next decade.

== In literature ==
The village of Crobost in Peter May's Lewis Trilogy is thought to be an amalgamated of the village of Adabroc and Skigersta.

== Images ==
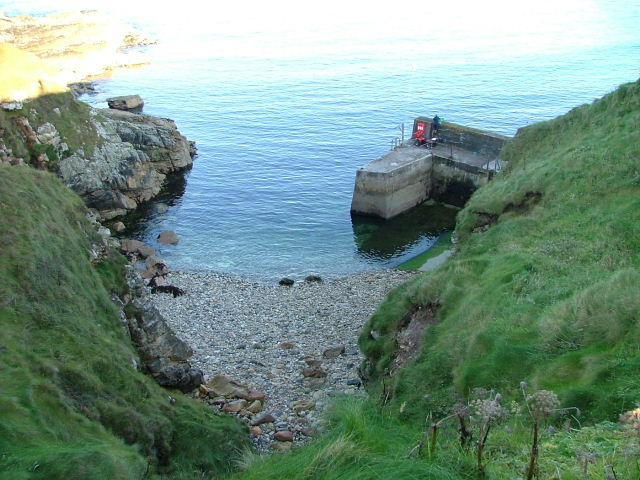

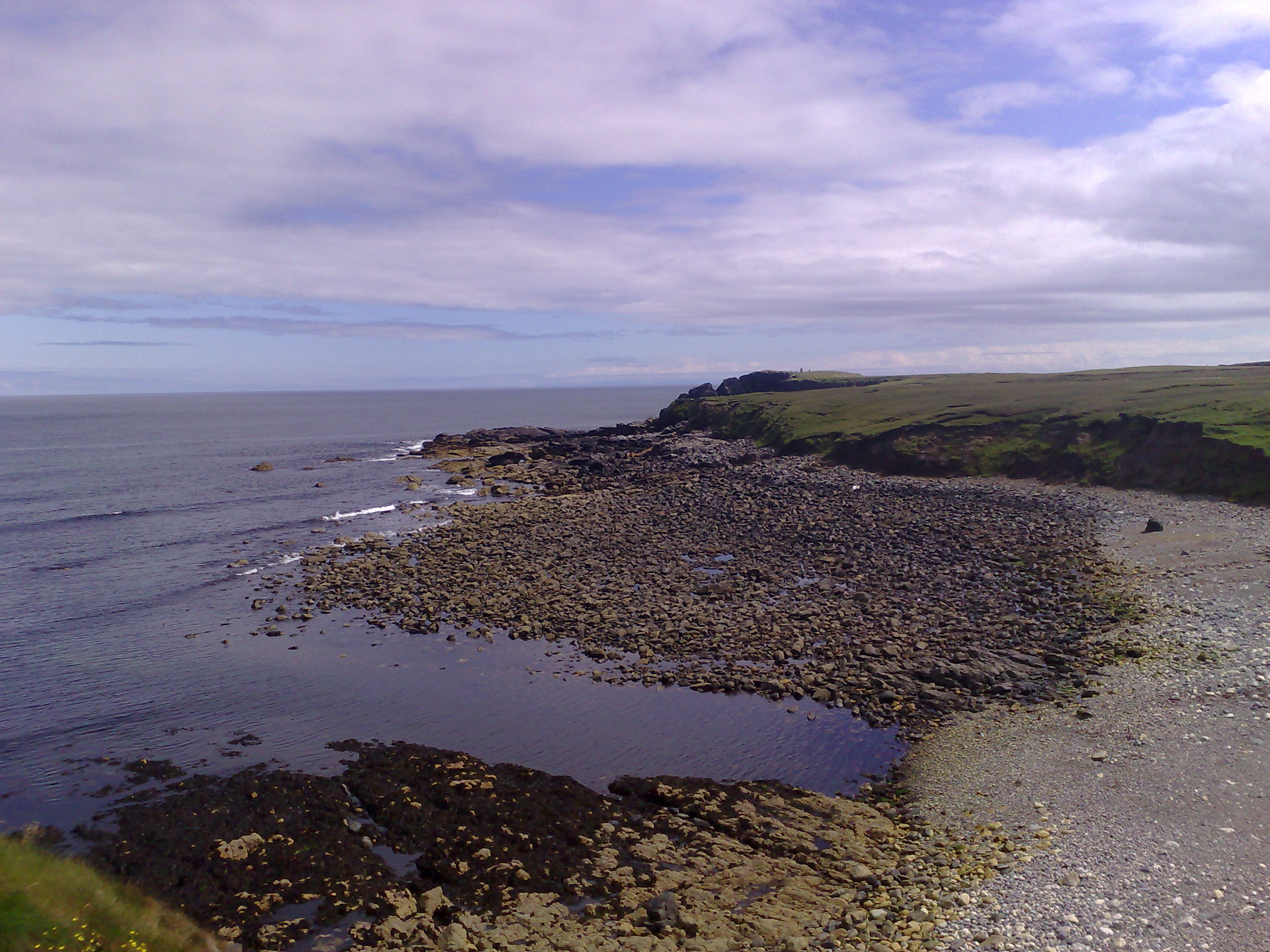

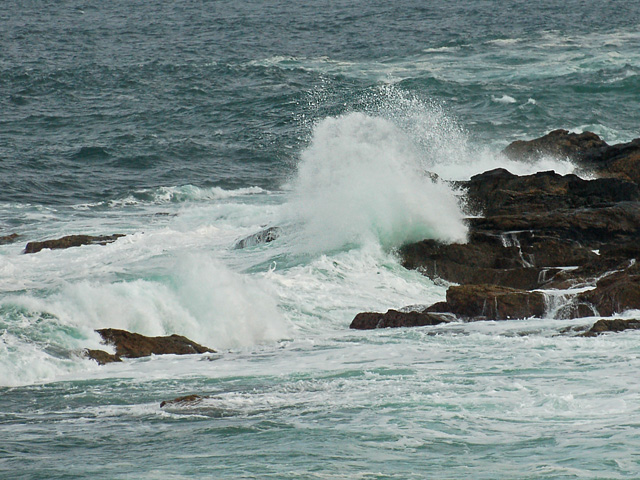

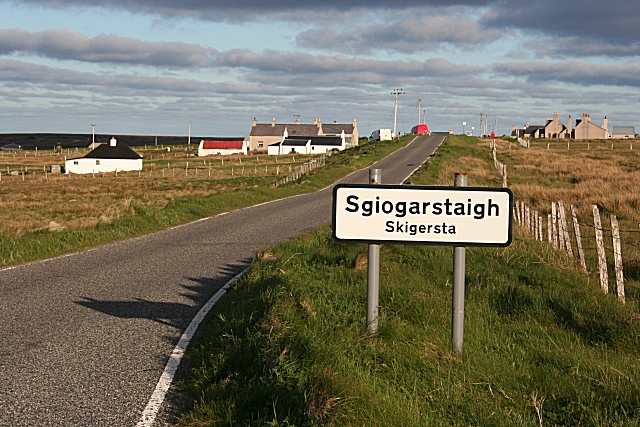
