= Magacela stele =

Archaeological artifact found in Spain

- Estela de Magacela (Spanish)
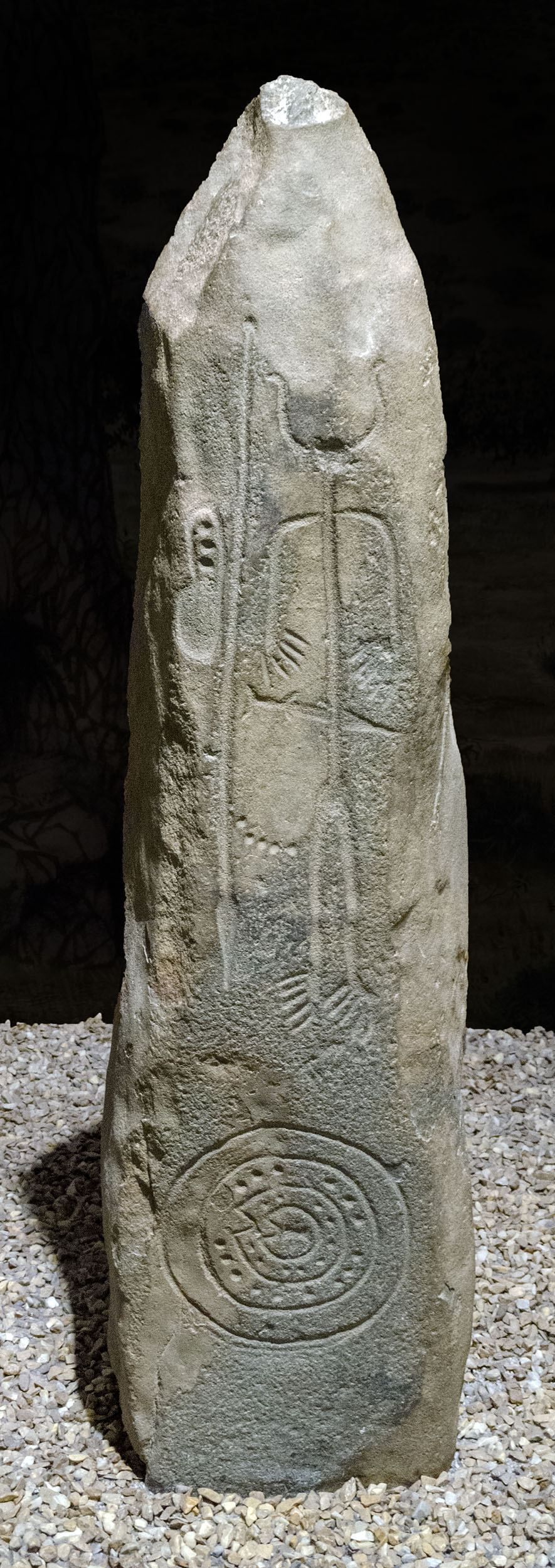
- Year: c. 1100–800 BC
- Medium: Slate
- Dimensions: (142 x 35 x 32) cm
- Location: National Archaeological Museum, Madrid, Spain

The Magacela stele is a stele found in southwestern Iberia, made of slate and dated from the Late Bronze Age. It is exhibited at the National Archaeological Museum in Madrid, Spain.

== History ==
By the 20th century, the slate stele had been repurposed as part of an orchard wall in Magacela, in the Spanish province of Badajoz. The owner of the property, Juan Delgado Torres, took the stele to the municipal hall and the artifact became known to the wider public in 1950. It was later donated to the personal collection of Eduardo Ezquer Gabaldón in San Pedro de Mérida. It later became part of the collection of the National Archaeological Museum.

== Description ==
The carved surface of the stele features a schematic human figure depicting a male warrior or chieftain (wearing a helmet with oversized horns), an edged weapon, a spear and an object tentatively identified as a handheld mirror. The objects are pointing down, underpinning the funerary nature of the artifact. Below the rest of the elements there is a carved round shield.
