= Magacela =

- municipality
- Flag Coat of arms

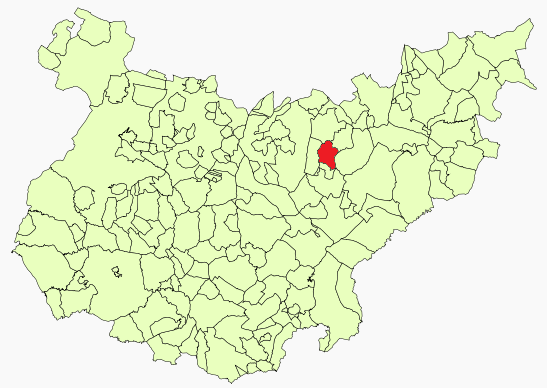
- Location in Badajoz

- Location of Magacela within Extremadura
- Coordinates: 38°53′44″N 5°44′4″W
- Country: Spain
- Autonomous community: Extremadura
- Province: Badajoz

Area
  - Total: 75 km^{2} (29 sq mi)

Population (2025-01-01)
  - Total: 502
  - Density: 6.7/km^{2} (17/sq mi)
- Time zone: UTC+1 (CET)
  - Summer (DST): UTC+2 (CEST)

Magacela is a municipality located in the province of Badajoz, Extremadura, Spain. According to the 2004 census (INE), the municipality has a population of 661 inhabitants.

== See also ==
- Magacela stele
- List of municipalities in Badajoz
