= Timsgarry =

Coordinates: 58.195°N 7.021°W

Timsgarry: Scottish Gaelic: Tuimisgearraidh
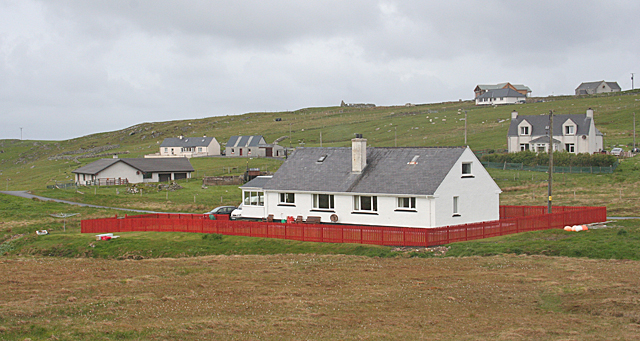

- Location within the Outer Hebrides
- Language: Scottish Gaelic; English
- OS grid reference: NB050338
- Civil parish: Uig
- Council area: Na h-Eileanan Siar
- Lieutenancy area: Western Isles
- Country: Scotland
- Sovereign state: United Kingdom
- Post town: ISLE OF LEWIS
- Postcode district: HS2
- Dialling code: 01851
- Police: Scotland
- Fire: Scottish
- Ambulance: Scottish
- UK Parliament: Na h-Eileanan an Iar
- Scottish Parliament: Na h-Eileanan an Iar

Timsgarry (Scottish Gaelic: Tuimisgearraidh) is a village on the Isle of Lewis, in the Outer Hebrides, Scotland. Timsgarry is home to the Baile na Cille Church and the Uig Museum, noted for its giant Chessmen, discovered in the sands in 1831.

== Geography ==
Timsgarry lies on the western side of the Isle of Lewis on Uig Bay, 33 1/2 miles (54 kilometres) southwest of Stornoway on the B8011 road, to the north of Ardroil. The Erista River flows in the sea at Timsgarry. The coastline here is known as Uig Sands (Tràigh Uuige).

== History ==
Fragments of Iron Age pottery were recovered from Dun Borranish, just to the south of the main settlement, in 1991.

== Landmarks ==
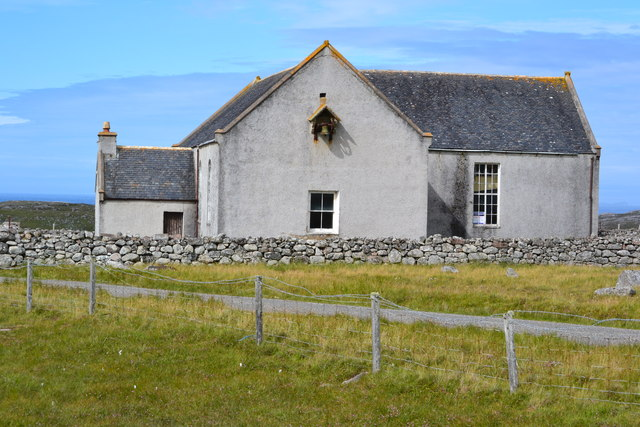
The church at Timsgarry

Timsgarry is home to the Baile na Cille Church, and is situated within the parish of Uig. Timsgarry used to have its own chapel, named Capail Mor, further to the west of the present church, which was built in 1724 near to the site of an earlier church, known as Capail Beag. The former manse is still present, with the churchyard.

The ruins of an even earlier church, Teampall Chrìosd (St Christopher's), is located to the west of Timsgarry. There is a legend that this burial ground was once a bare rock and a man called Eidheann brought the soil from a nearby hill, Cnoc Eidheann to build the knoll it resides on. Under the mound is said to be a pagan temple or dun. At one time the burial ground was supposed to be for the exclusive use of Clan Macaulay. It is now a scheduled monument.

The Uig Museum is located at Timsgarry, within the community centre, and displays local archaeology, such as replicas of the Uig Chessmen, discovered in the sands in 1831. These were identified as 12th century Viking chess pieces which were made from walrus ivory and whale teeth.

Uig Lodge Golf Course, to the southwest of the village overlooking Uig Sands Bay, was originally established in 1930 and recently restored. It is currently run by the Uig Lodge and used exclusively by hotel guests.
