= Eilean Mhealasta =

Island in Outer Hebrides, Scotland

Eilean Mhealasta (Gaelic)

Location
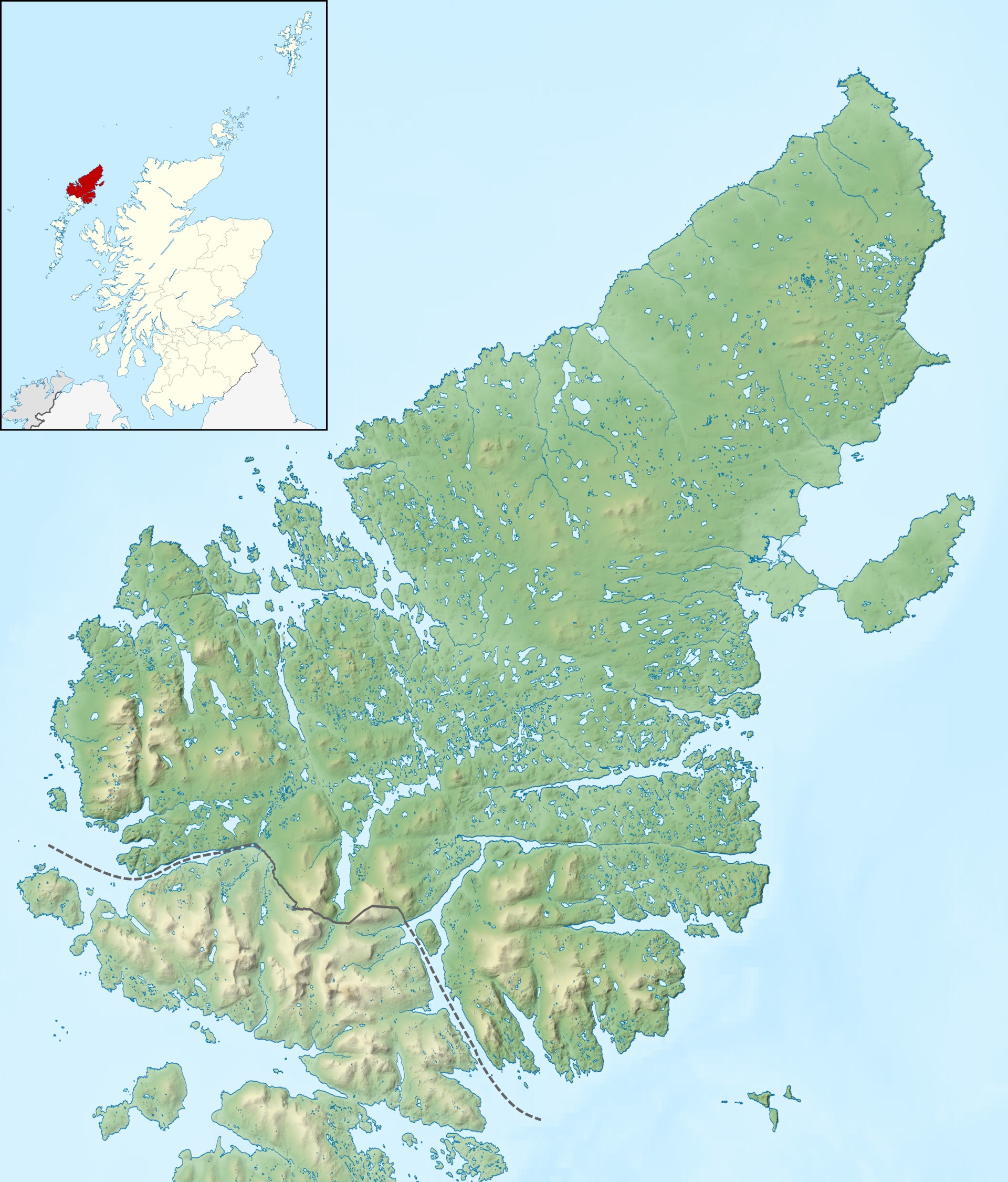
- Eilean Mhealasta shown next to Lewis Eilean Mhealasta shown within the Outer Hebrides
- OS grid reference: NB382099
- Coordinates: 58.08°N 7.13°W

Name
- Name meaning: promontory farm
- Old Norse name: muli-stoair

Physical geography
- Island group: Lewis and Harris
- Area: 124 ha (310 acres)
- Area rank: 135
- Highest elevation: Cnoc Àrd 77 m

Administration
- Council area: Na h-Eileanan Siar
- Country: Scotland
- Sovereign state: United Kingdom

Demographics
- Population: 0

Eilean Mhealasta (Mealista Island) is an uninhabited island off the west coast of Lewis in the Outer Hebrides of Scotland. It takes its name from Mealista, a nearby township on Lewis.

== History ==
Nearby Mealista had a shrine to St Catan, but it is not known if the island itself had a Culdee settlement.

The ruins of old buildings of a previous community can still be seen. In 1823 the island was incorporated into a sheep farm. Thereafter no permanent inhabitants were recorded. A folk myth says that anyone born on Eilean Mhealasta will grow up to be an idiot. Haswell-Smith suggests that the landlords started this rumour to encourage residents to leave. In the 1861 census, it was recorded that some sailors from Rosehearty were camping there.

In about 1785 a boat from Mealista carrying a cargo of timber took shelter from a gale at the southernmost point of the Pairc. Nothing more was heard of the crew and on Mealista they were given up as lost at sea. During the following summer, blankets were offered for sale at the annual market day at Stornoway. The blankets were recognised by an unusual identification mark and a confession of murder for the cargo of timber followed.

The island is still used as sheep grazing.

== Geography and geology ==
Eilean Mhealasta lies 1/2 mile (800 metres) from the west coast of Lewis, 3 miles (5 kilometres) south of Brenish (Breanais) and several miles north of Scarp. It is just over a kilometre long, and indented with a bay, Camas Leirageo in the west, which contains, Sgeir na Geòdha Ruaidh. The east coast has a clean sandy beach, while the west coast is rocky.

The island is a bedrock of gneiss, some of which contains a reddish quartz. There are natural arches on the east coast.
