= Lewis chessmen =

Group of 12th-century chess pieces

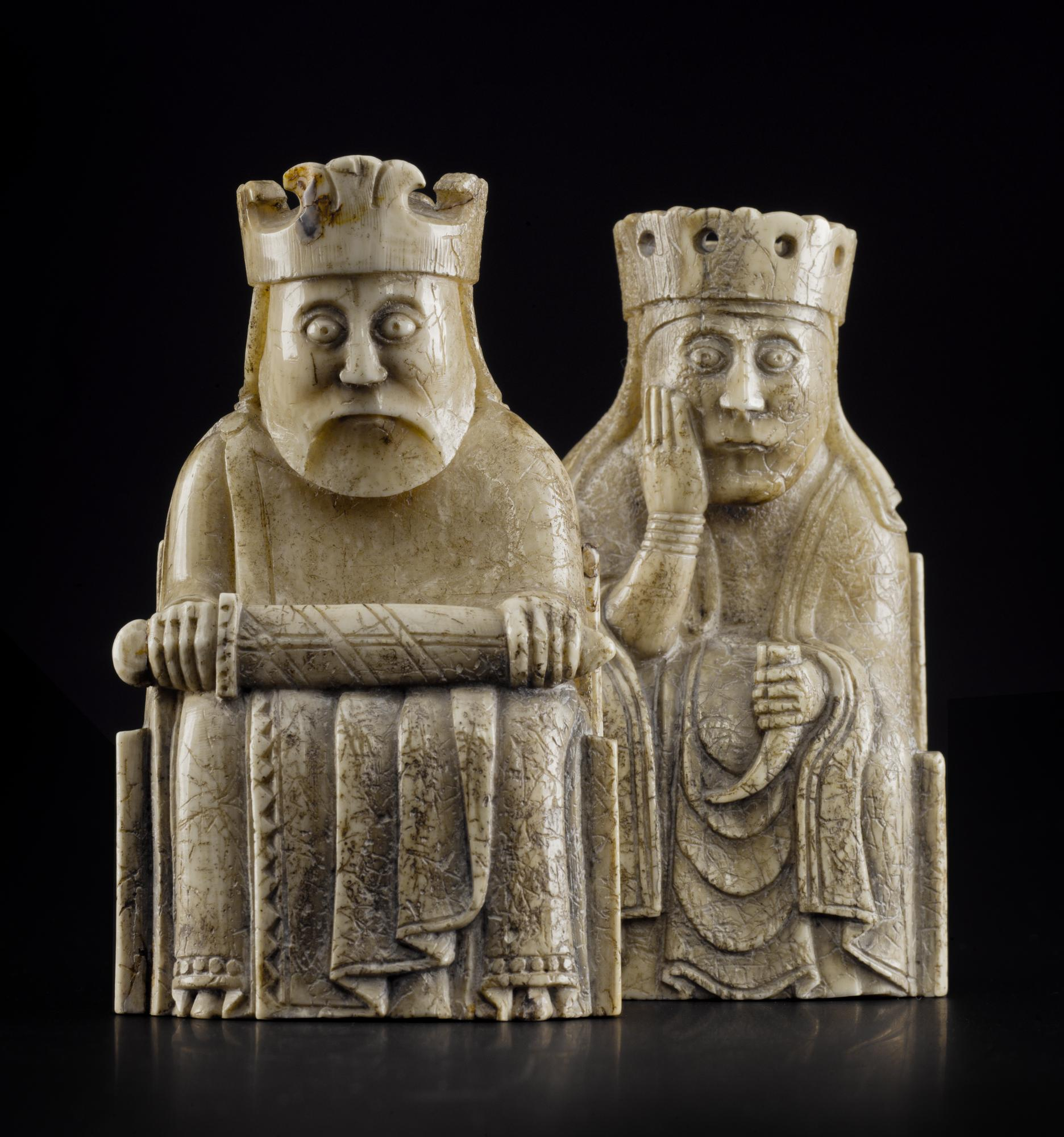
- Lewis chessmen in the National Museum of Scotland
- Material: Walrus ivory and whales' teeth
- Created: 12th century
- Discovered: 1831; Uig, Lewis, Scotland
- Present location: British Museum; National Museum of Scotland
- NMS website entry

The Lewis chessmen (Scottish Gaelic: Fir-thàilisg Leòdhais [fiɾʲˈhaːlɪʃkʲ loː.ɪʃ]) or Uig chessmen, named after the island or the bay where they were found, are a group of distinctive 12th-century chess pieces, along with other game pieces, most of which are carved from walrus ivory. Discovered in 1831 on the Isle of Lewis in the Outer Hebrides of Scotland, they may constitute some of the few surviving medieval chess sets, although it is not clear if a single complete period-accurate set can be assembled from the pieces. When found, the hoard contained 94 objects: 78 chess pieces, 14 tablemen (pieces for backgammon or similar games) and one belt buckle. Today, 82 pieces are owned and usually exhibited by the British Museum in London, and the remaining 11 are at the National Museum of Scotland in Edinburgh; at least one chess piece is owned privately.

A newly identified piece, a "warder", the equivalent of a rook, was sold for £735,000 in July 2019. Four other major pieces, and many pawns, remain missing from the chess sets.

== Origin and discovery ==
The Lewis chessmen were probably made between 1150 and 1200 AD. They are commonly believed to have been made in Trondheim, Norway, though some scholars have alternatively suggested Icelandic or local Hebridean manufacture. They are usually thought to have been brought to Lewis as part of a merchant's wares.

The chessmen were discovered in 1831. Most accounts have said they were found at Uig Bay on the west coast of Lewis, but Caldwell et al. of National Museums Scotland consider that Mealista, which is also in the parish of Uig and some 6 miles (10 km) further south down the coast, is a more likely place for the hoard to have been discovered. Their discovery was initially credited to an unnamed local peasant; the name of the discoverer is first recorded in 1863 as Malcolm MacLeod from the nearby township of Pennydonald.

== Description ==
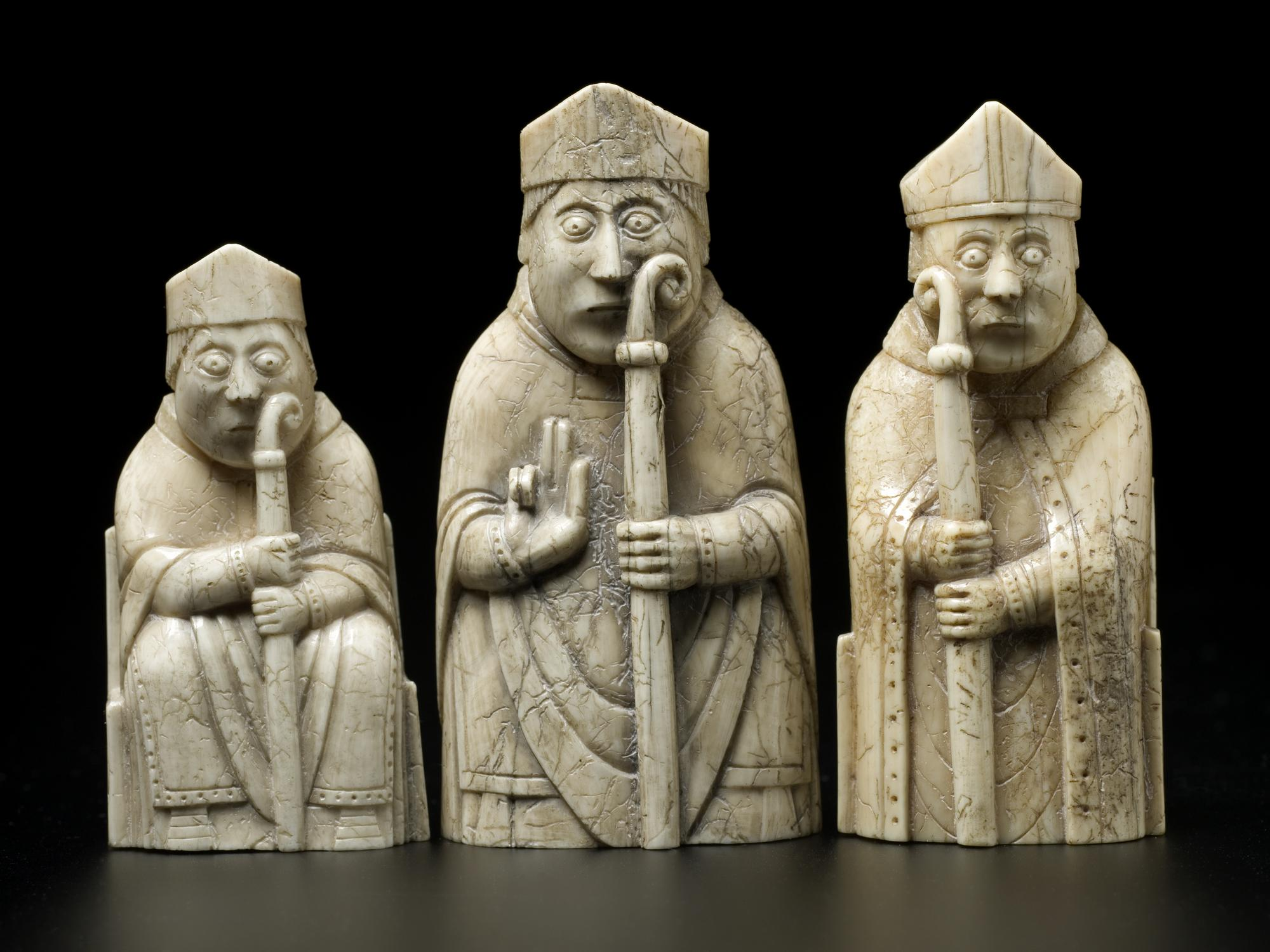
Three bishops from the Lewis hoard in the collection of the National Museum of Scotland. Different versions of the same piece vary noticeably in size.

Almost all of the pieces in the collection are carved from walrus ivory, with a few made instead from whale teeth. The 79 chess pieces consist of 8 kings, 8 queens, 16 bishops, 15 knights, 13 warders (rooks) and 19 pawns. (Note: Current total of 79 pieces, after 2019 recovery of the 13th warder (rook); original discovery had 12 warders / 78 chess pieces.) The heights of the pawns range from 3.5 to 5.8 cm (1 3 / 8 to 2 9 / 32 in), while the other pieces are between 7 and 10.2 cm (2 3 / 4 and 4 in). Although there are 19 pawns (a complete set requires 16), they have the greatest range of sizes of all the pieces, which has suggested that the 79 chess pieces might belong to at least five sets; however, Caldwell et al. note that the creators of the Lewis chess sets may never have intended the sets to be as uniform as modern audiences with access to sets mass produced in factories expect.

Based on the pieces' facial features, Caldwell, Hall, and Wilkinson place them in five groups, which they propose were the work of five different craftsmen. Nine of the pieces are not able to be assigned to any of these groups. They suggest that two of these, a king and a warder, may have been made at a different workshop entirely, perhaps to replace missing or broken pieces.

All the pieces in the back rank are sculptures of human figures. The knights are mounted on rather diminutive horses and are shown holding spears and shields. The rooks are standing soldiers or "warders" holding shields and swords; four of the rooks are shown as wild-eyed berserkers biting their shields with battle fury. The kings are depicted sitting on thrones, wearing crowns, and holding swords. The queens also sit on thrones and wear crowns; they have their right hands on their faces. Seven of the bishops are seated, nine are standing; each holds a crozier and some also have books.

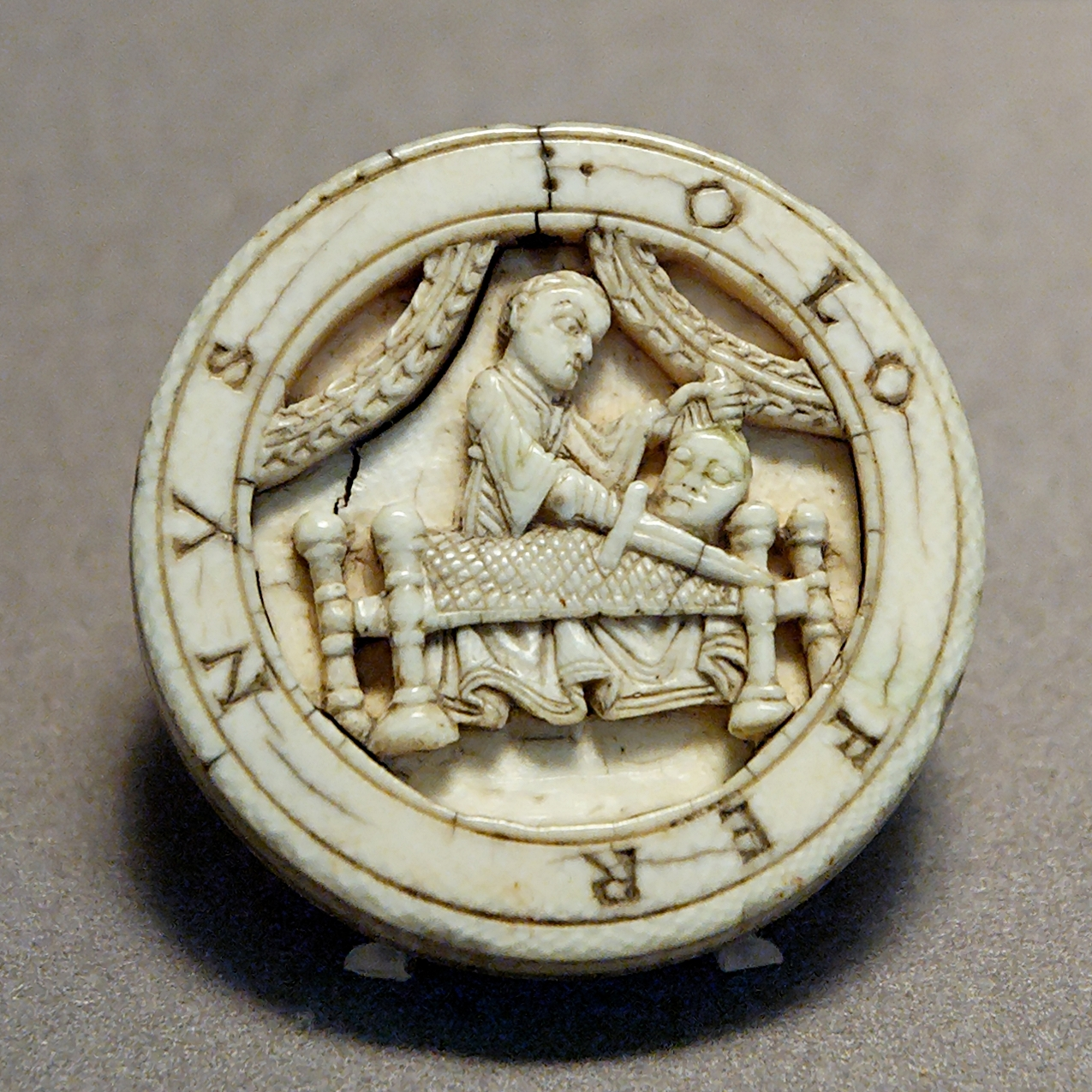
Medieval tablemen were often elaborately carved, like this 12th-century trictrac piece in the Louvre; the undecorated pieces found in the Lewis hoard may have been unfinished.

All the pawns are smaller, geometric shapes – cylinders and "tombstones" – perhaps intended to resemble boundary markers. The combination of abstract pawns with figurative pieces is unique among medieval chess sets; it is possible therefore that the Lewis "pawns" were not part of the same sets as the other pieces.

The fourteen tablemen found in the hoard are unusual in being largely undecorated – other examples from this period are typically decorated with detailed relief carving. They may have been unfinished pieces intended to be carved later.

Some pieces bore traces of red stain when found (which has since vanished), possibly indicating that red and white were used to distinguish the two sides, rather than the black and white generally used in modern chess. A study of the pieces in the National Museums Scotland collection found traces of mercury on the surface of the pieces; the authors suggested that this was due to the use of the red pigment cinnabar. There is no evidence of wear on the surface of the pieces which might indicate use; however, as walrus ivory is very hard, this does not necessarily indicate that the pieces were unused when buried.

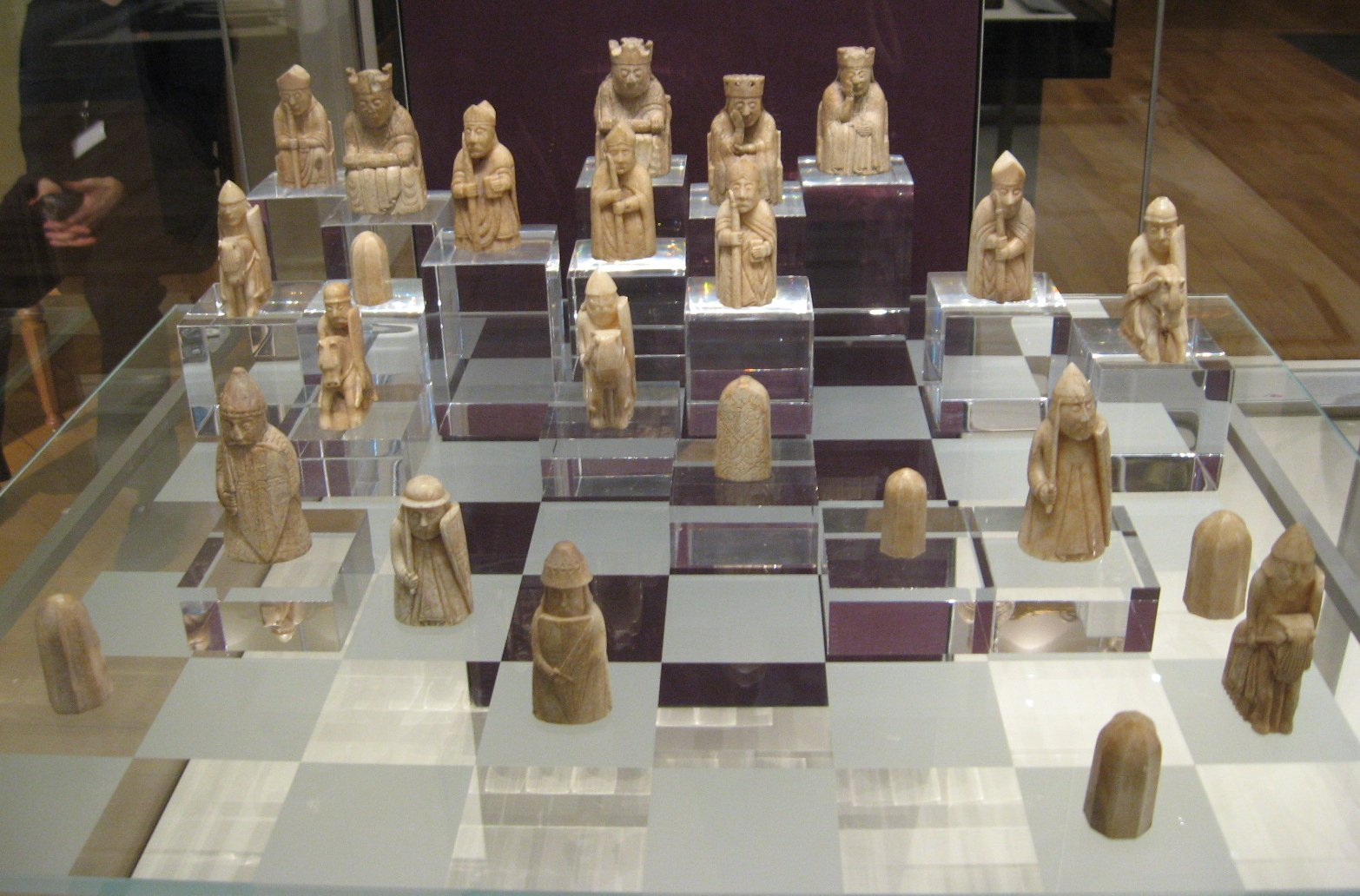
The Lewis chessmen in the British Museum

Scholars have observed that, to the modern eye, the figural pieces, with their bulging eyes and glum expressions, have a distinctly comic character. This is especially true of one rook ("warder 4" in Madden's numbering) with a worried, sideways glance and the berserker rooks biting their shields, which have been called "irresistibly comic to a modern audience". It is believed, however, that the comic or sad expressions were not intended or perceived as such by the makers, who instead saw strength, ferocity, or in the case of the queens who hold their heads with a hand and seemingly pensive expression, "contemplation, repose, and possibly wisdom".

Moreover, a recent article has examined how one of the king pieces projected a racialised representation of the archetypal chess king. Chess pieces envisioned human bodies which were constantly re-imagined and re-interpreted in the medieval period, and the Lewis chess king is fittingly characterised by a beard, hairstyle, and facial features that would not stand out in twelfth-century Norway, the supposed origin point of the set.

== Exhibition and ownership ==
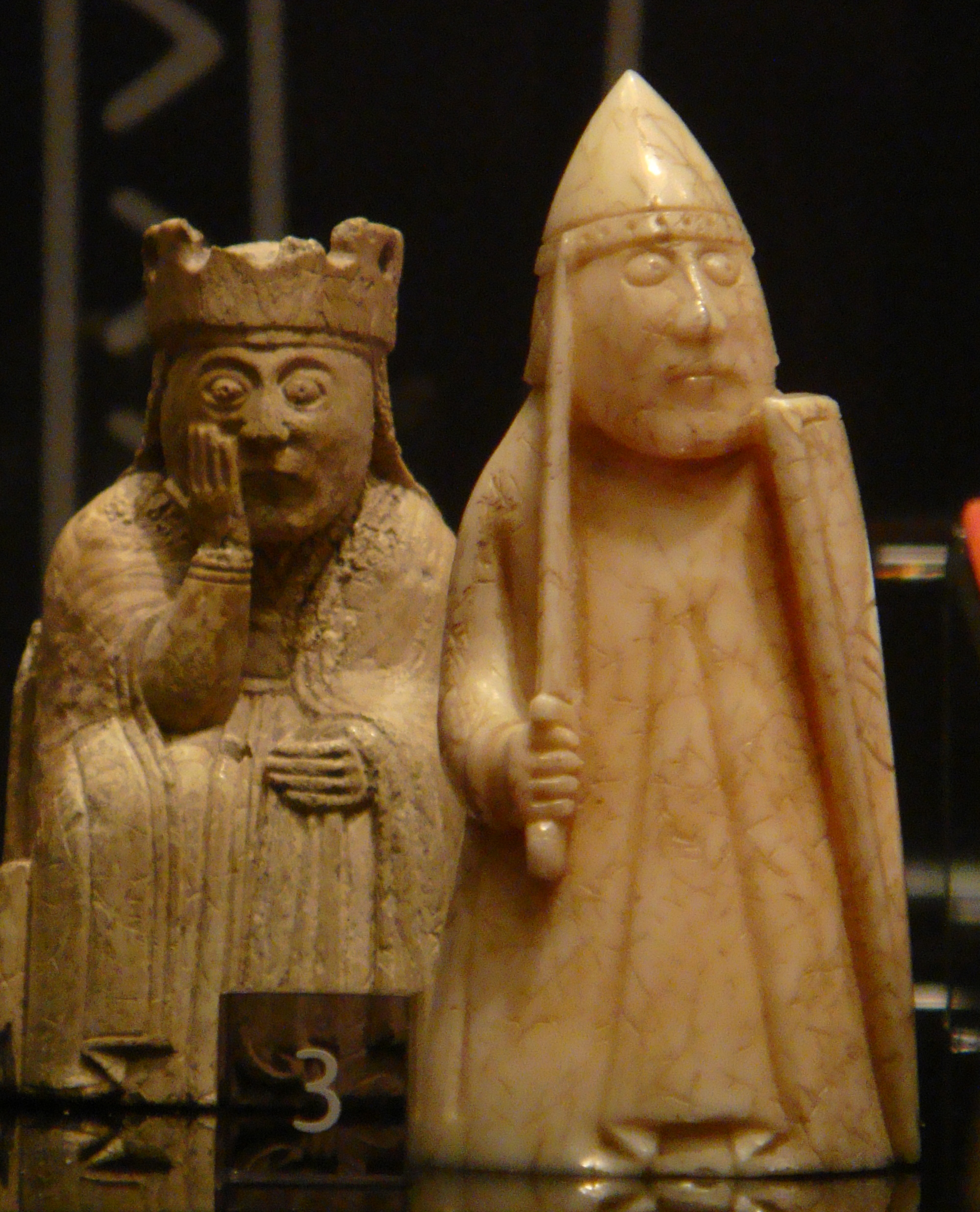
A queen and a warder (rook) in the joint exhibition in Edinburgh, 2010

The chessmen were first exhibited at a meeting of the Society of Antiquaries of Scotland on 11 April 1831 by Roderick Ririe, from Stornoway. Ririe sold ten of the pieces to Charles Kirkpatrick Sharpe, a Scottish collector; Sharpe later acquired another bishop, probably also from Ririe. Ririe sold the remainder of the pieces to a Mr. T. A. Forrest, from whom they were bought by the British Museum.

The British Museum purchase was instigated by F. Madden, Assistant Keeper of Manuscripts, who as well as being a paleographer was a chess enthusiast. The museum paid 80 guineas (equivalent to £8,131 in 2025) for the 82 pieces. Madden immediately began writing a research paper about the collection; the paper remains informative today.

After Sharpe's death, his pieces were sold to Baron Londesborough. In 1888, they were sold through Christie's to the Society of Antiquaries of Scotland, for the National Museum of Scotland.

When the chessmen were uncovered in 1831, 1 knight and 4 warders were missing from the four sets. In June 2019 it was announced that a warder piece, which had previously gone unrecognised for at least 55 years, had emerged in Edinburgh half a year earlier. This so-called "Antique Walrus Tusk Warrior Chessman" was purchased at a Sotheby's auction for £735,000 the following month, by an undisclosed buyer.

Of the pieces given to the British Museum, most can be found in Room 40, with the registration numbers M&ME 1831, 11–1.78–159. Others have been lent to Scottish museums and temporary exhibitions. A range of wooden or plastic replicas are popular items in the Museum shops.

The chessmen were number 5 in the list of British archaeological finds selected by experts at the British Museum for a 2003 BBC documentary. They were one of the items featured in the 2010 Radio 4 historical series A History of the World in 100 Objects.

An exhibition entitled "The Lewis Chessmen: Unmasked" included chess pieces from both the National Museum of Scotland and British Museum collections, along with other relevant objects. It opened in Edinburgh on 21 May 2010 and proceeded to Aberdeen, Shetland, and the Museum nan Eilean in Stornoway, opening there on 15 April 2011.

Six of the British Museum chessmen were loaned to Manx National Heritage for the exhibition "The Forgotten Kingdom" from November 2012. An exhibition entitled "The Game of Kings: Medieval Ivory Chessmen from the Isle of Lewis" at The Cloisters in New York City included 34 of the chess pieces, all on loan from the British Museum. The exhibit lasted until 22 April 2012.

On 3 April 2013, £1.8 million from the European Regional Development Fund was granted to transform Lews Castle, Isle of Lewis, into a museum for the Western Isles. Around £14 million in total was allocated for restoring and converting the property, which had been shuttered for nearly 25 years. The Museum nan Eilean, located on the castle grounds, features a display of six Lewis chessmen on loan from the British Museum.

The Edinburgh warder piece was displayed at the Neue Galerie New York in 2023 as part of a special exhibit. Six of the British Museum's pieces were loaned to the NTNU University Museum in Trondheim for the exhibition Sea Ivories, running from May 2025 until January 2026.

== Dispute over location ==
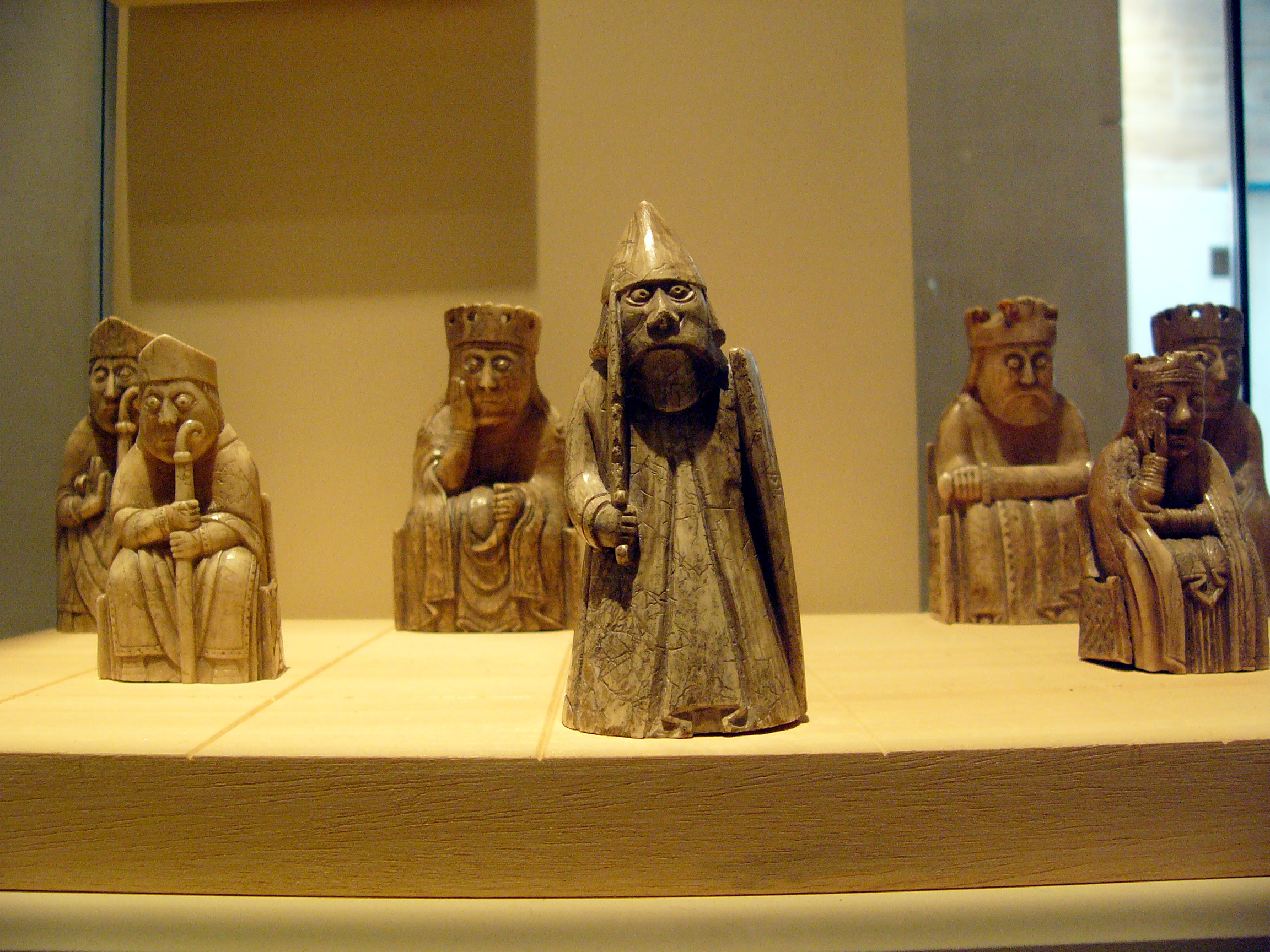
Lewis chessmen in the National Museum of Scotland in Edinburgh

In late 2007, a dispute arose as to where the main resting place of the pieces should be. There were calls from Scottish National Party politicians in the Western Isles (notably Councillor Annie Macdonald, Alasdair Allan MSP and Angus MacNeil MP) for the return of the pieces to the place they were found. Linda Fabiani, Scottish Minister for Europe, External Affairs and Culture, stated that "it is unacceptable that only 11 Lewis chessmen rest at the National Museum of Scotland while the other 67 (as well as the 14 tablemen) remain in the British Museum in London."

Richard Oram, Professor of Medieval and Environmental History at the University of Stirling, agreed, arguing that there was no reason for there to be more than "a sample" of the collection in London. These views were dismissed by Margaret Hodge, the then UK Minister of State in the Department for Culture, Media and Sport, writing "It's a lot of nonsense, isn't it?", noting that the law protects purchases and drawing comparisons to major artworks in Europe housed in major cities, with replicas often available in situ where tourism is sufficient. The historical society in Uig, Comann Eachdraidh Ùig, which operates its museum near the find site, features detailed information about the chessmen and Norse occupation in Lewis. It has published that it cannot claim to own the pieces and would allow the normal museum market to determine whether more originals should rest in Edinburgh. It welcomes short-term loans.

In October 2009, 24 of the pieces from London and 6 from Edinburgh began a 16 month tour of Scotland, partly funded by the Scottish Government, whose Minister for Culture and External Affairs, Mike Russell, stated that the Government and the British Museum had "agreed to disagree" on their eventual fate. Bonnie Greer, the museum's deputy chairman, said that she "absolutely" believed the main collection should remain in London.

Neil MacGregor, who at the time of the debate was director of the British Museum, was reported to say that it was Norway who was entitled to ask for them back, not Scotland. In 2015, six of the British Museum pieces were sent to the Museum nam Eilan on Lewis on long-term loan.

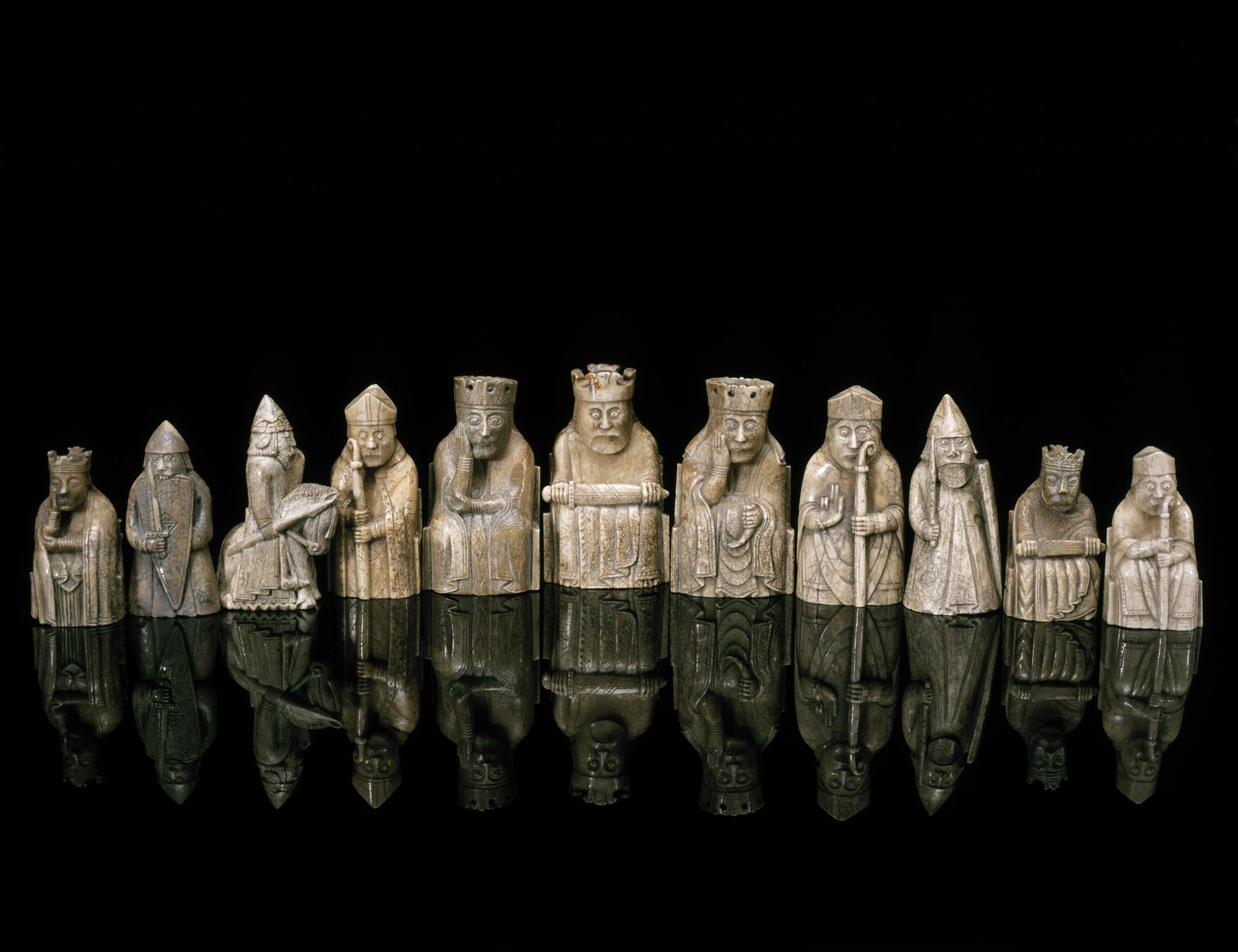
Chessmen at NMS

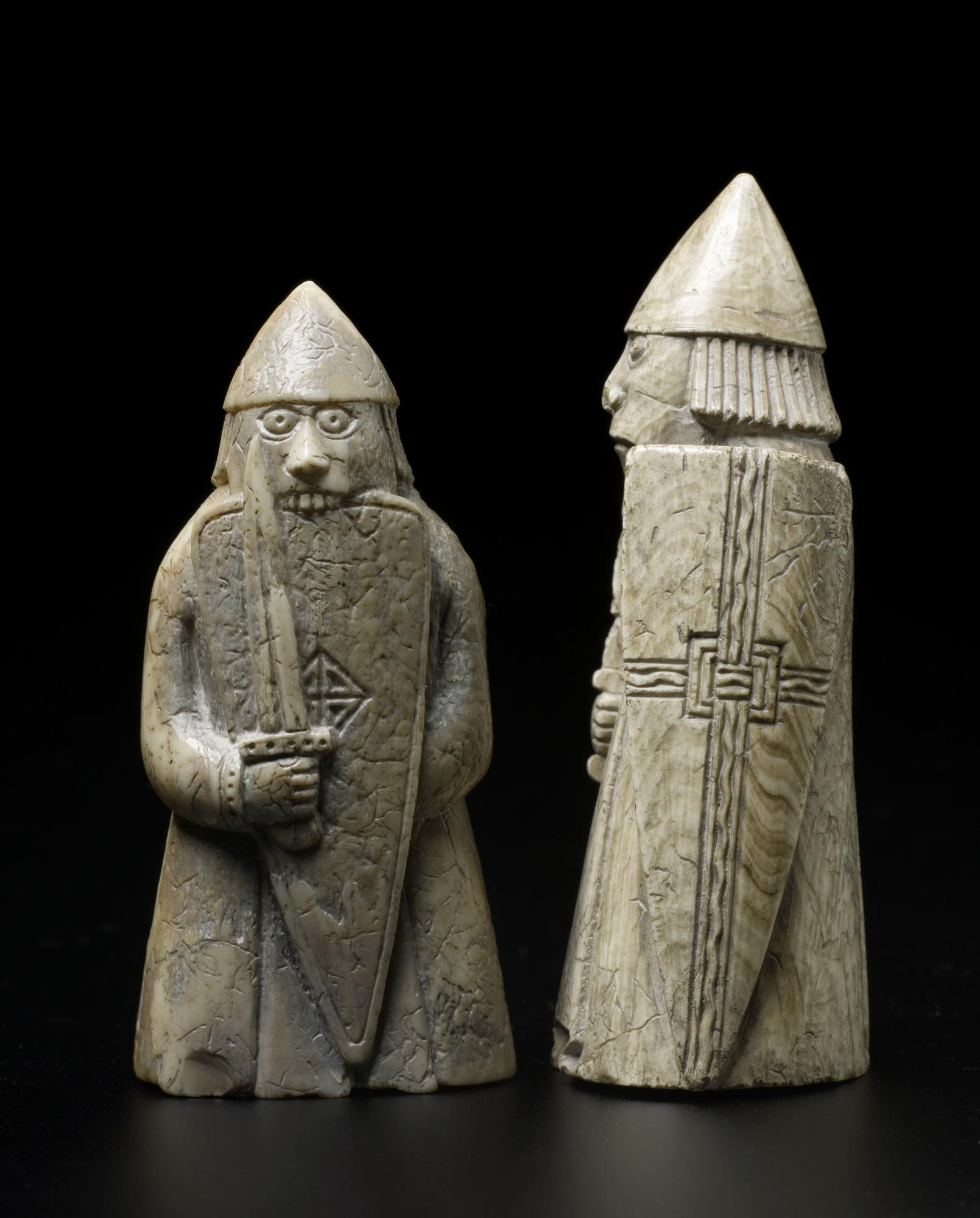
Face of a "berserker" warder (rook) and profile of an ordinary warder at NMS

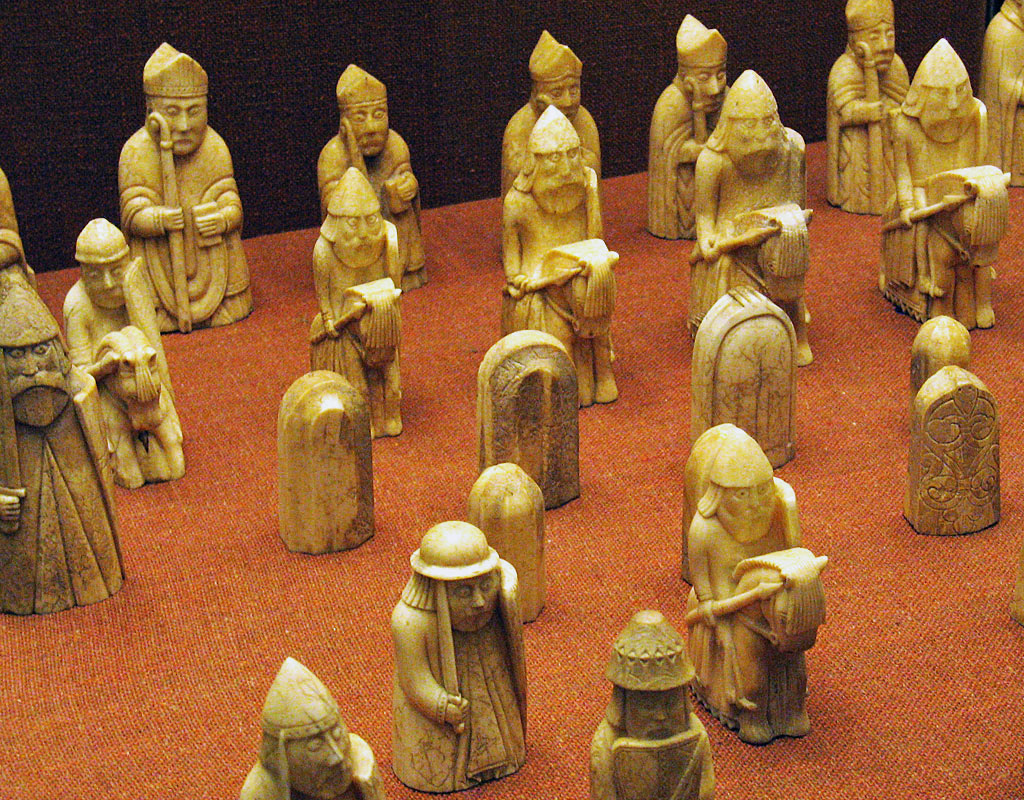
Row of bishops at the back and then knights, among a selection pieces on display at BM

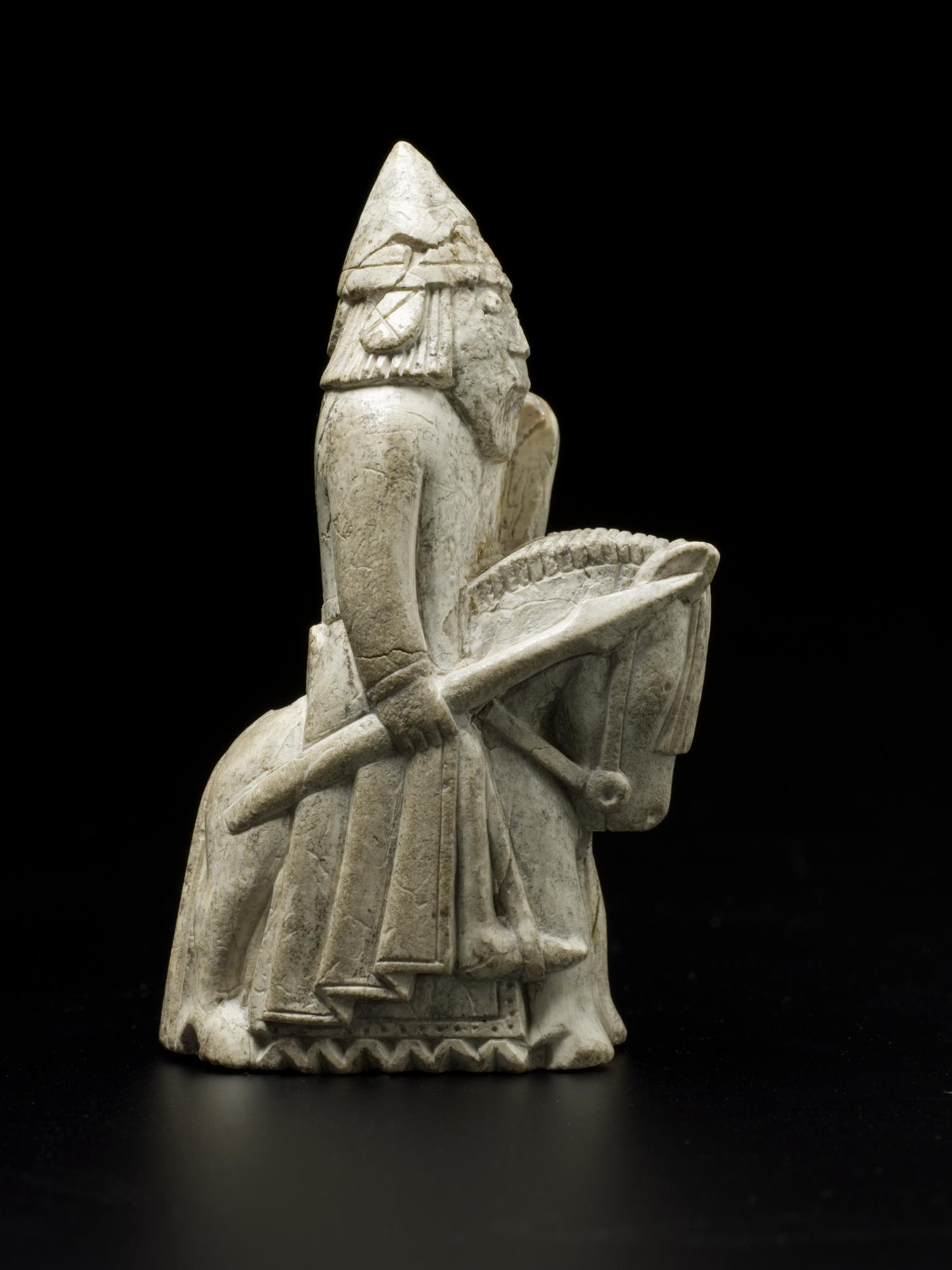
Knight on a stout pony

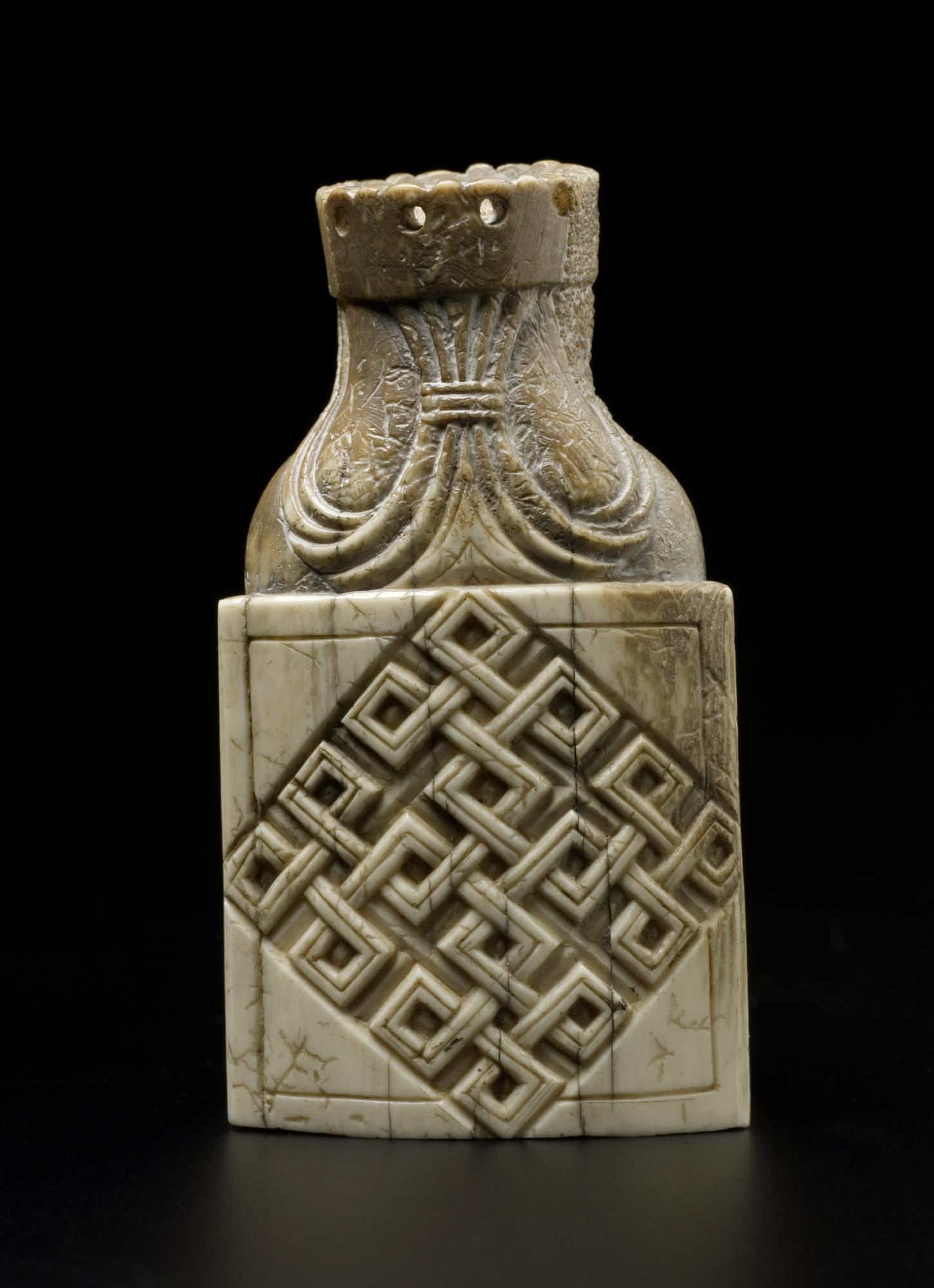
Decoration carved on back of a queen's throne at NMS

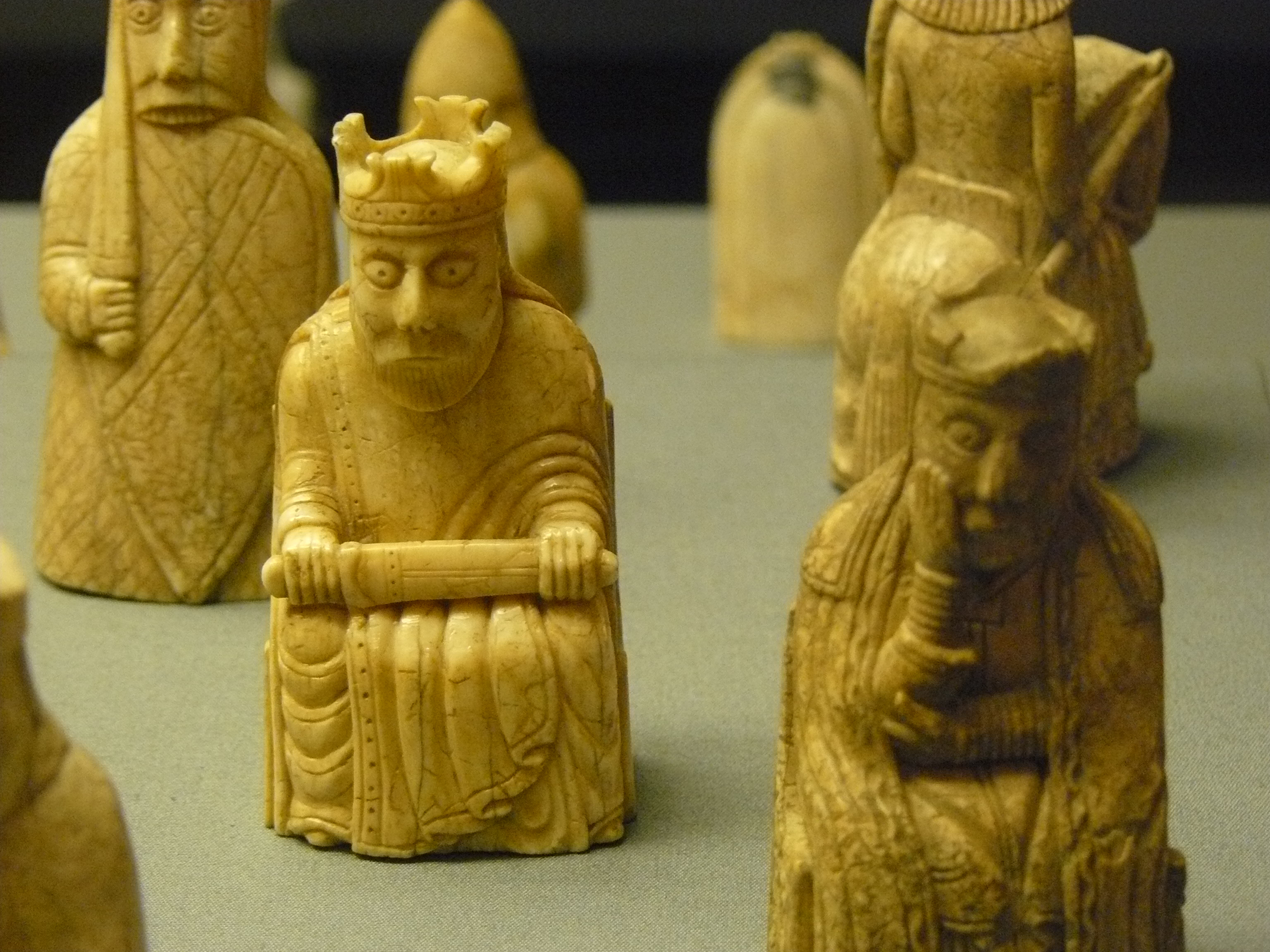
King and queen, with "berserker" warder (rook) and knight behind them, at BM

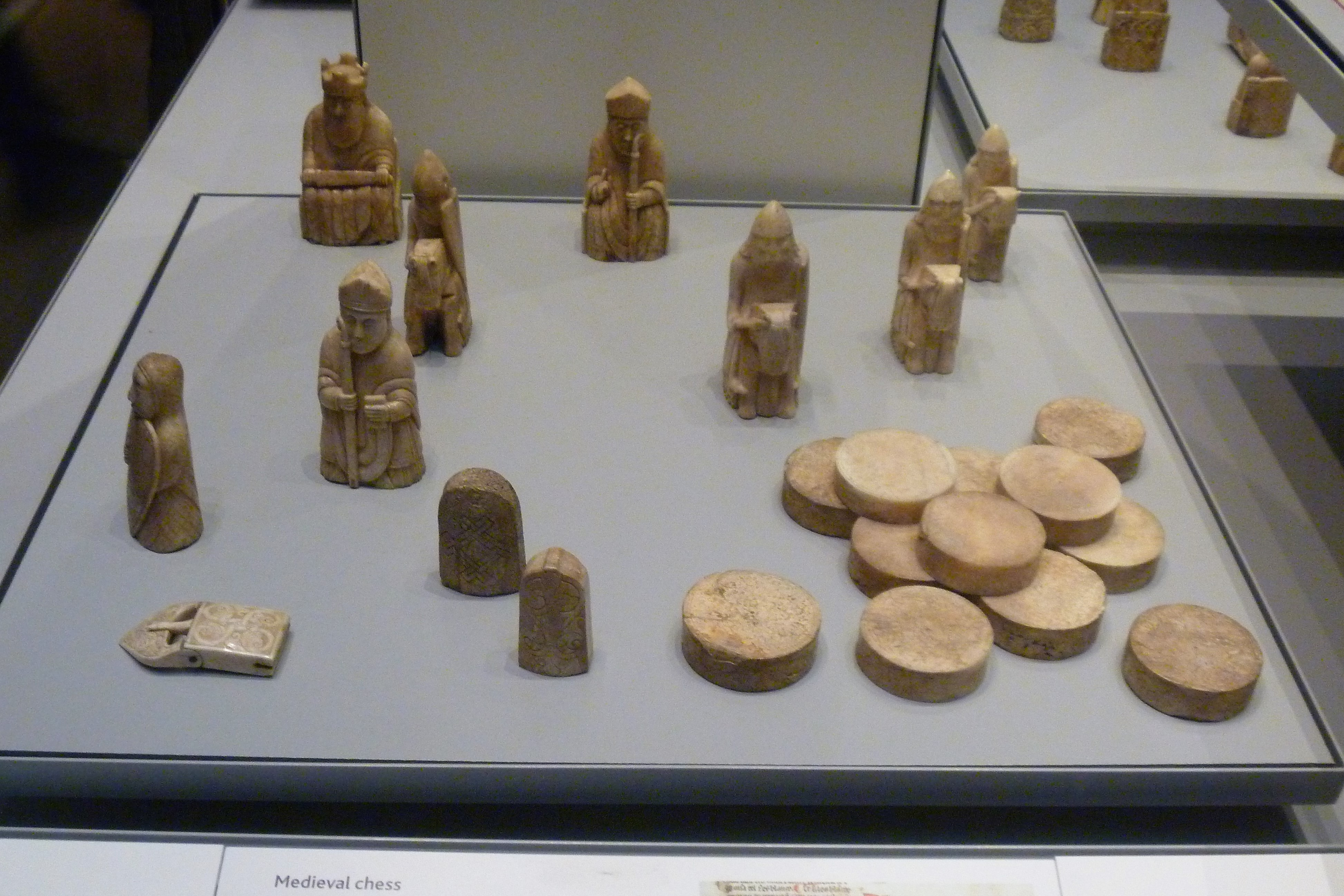
Objects from the Lewis Hoard: ten chessmen, twelve tablemen, and the buckle

== See also ==
- Charlemagne chessmen

== Sources ==
- Brown, Nancy Marie (2016). Ivory Vikings: The mystery of the most famous chessmen in the world and the woman who made them. St. Martin's Press. ISBN 978-1-250-10859-3.
- Caldwell, David H.; Hall, Mark A.; Wilkinson, Caroline M. (2009). "The Lewis Hoard of Gaming Pieces Re-Examined". Medieval Archaeology. 53.
- Caldwell, David H.; Hall, Mark A.; Wilkinson, Caroline M. (2011). The Lewis Chessmen Unmasked. National Museums Scotland. ISBN 978-1-905267-46-0.
- Madden, F. (1832). "VII Historical remarks on the introduction of the game of chess into Europe, and on the ancient chess-men discovered in the Isle of Lewis". Archaeologia, or, Miscellaneous Tracts, Relating to Antiquity. 24. Society of Antiquaries of London: 203–291 – via Internet Archive (archive.org).
- Murray, H.J.R. (1985). A History of Chess. Oxford University Press.
- Robinson, James (2004). The Lewis Chessmen. British Museum Press. ISBN 9780714150239.
- Schulte, Michael (2017). "Board games of the Vikings – From hnefatafl to chess". Maal og Minne.
- "Attributed to the Lewis chessmen workshop, probably Norwegian, Trondheim, 13th century: a warder". Old-master sculptural works of art. Sotheby's. 2019. Archived from the original on 30 November 2019.
- Stratford, N. (1997). The Lewis Chessmen and the Enigma of the Hoard. The British Museum Press.
- Taylor, Michael (1978). The Lewis Chessmen. British Museum Publications Limited.
- Tate, Jim; Reiche, I.; Pinzari, F.; Clark, J.; Caldwell, F. (2011). "History and Surface Condition of the Lewis Chessmen in the Collection of the National Museums Scotland (Hebrides, late 12th-early 13th centuries)". ArchaeoSciences. 35.
- Ilko, Krisztina (2024). "Chess and Race in the Global Middle Ages". Speculum. 99 (2): 480-540. doi:10.1017/S0080440124000136.
