= Kneep =

Village on the Isle of Lewis, Scotland

Coordinates: 58.221°N 6.947°W

Kneep: Scottish Gaelic: Cnìp
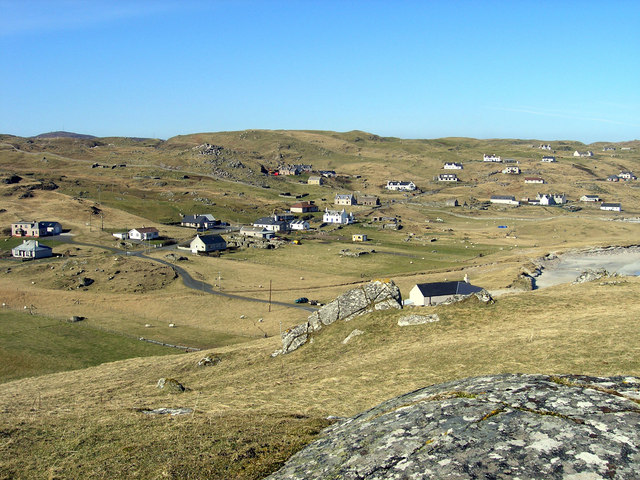
- A view of Kneep, with Valtos beyond

- Location within the Outer Hebrides
- Language: Scottish Gaelic; English
- OS grid reference: NB095364
- Civil parish: Uig
- Council area: Na h-Eileanan Siar
- Lieutenancy area: Western Isles
- Country: Scotland
- Sovereign state: United Kingdom
- Post town: ISLE OF LEWIS
- Postcode district: HS2
- Dialling code: 01851
- Police: Scotland
- Fire: Scottish
- Ambulance: Scottish
- UK Parliament: Na h-Eileanan an Iar
- Scottish Parliament: Na h-Eileanan an Iar

Kneep (Scottish Gaelic: Cnìp) is a village on the Isle of Lewis, in the Outer Hebrides, Scotland. Kneep is within the parish of Uig.

Various archaeological discoveries have been made at Kneep, including a Viking cemetery and a number of Viking burials, as well as a cist. Other archaeological discoveries include prehistoric, Bronze Age and Iron Age sites in the dunes to the east of the settlement.
