= Camas Uig =

Bay on Isle of Lewis, Scotland

Coordinates: 58°12′01″N 7°01′01″W

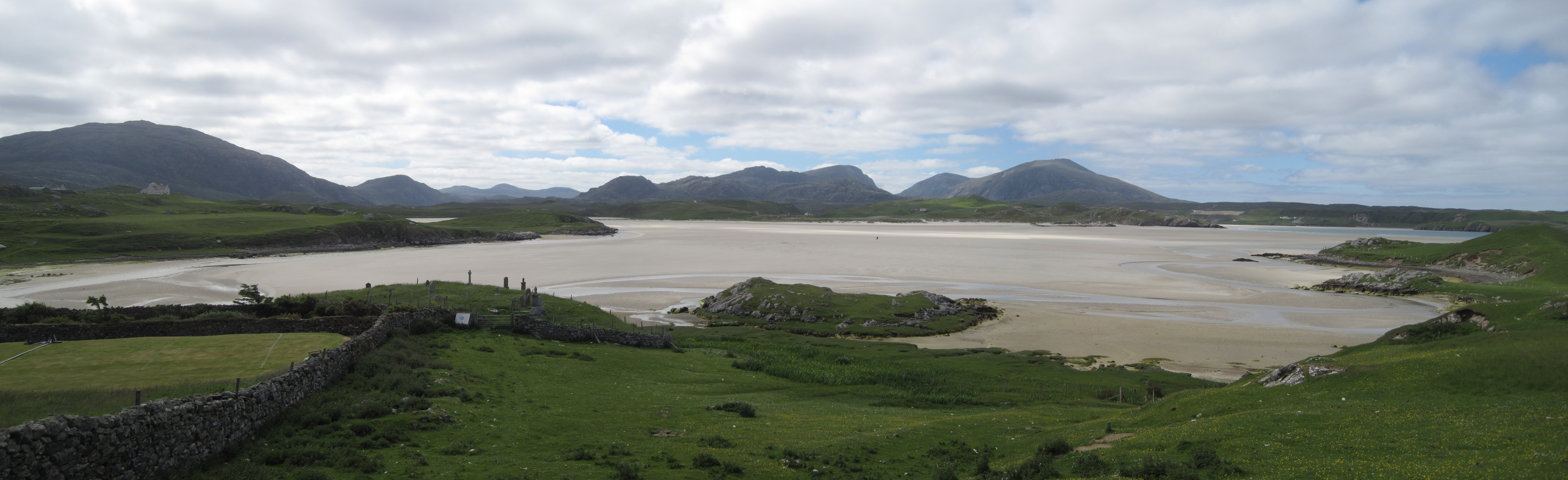
Camas Uig with Uig Sands in the foreground

Camas Uig (Uig Bay) is a bay on the west coast of the Isle of Lewis, in the Outer Hebrides of Scotland.

The bay contains a variety of small islets including Fraoch Eilean, Leac Holm, Sgeir a' Chàis, Sgeir Liath, Sgeir Sheilibhig, Tom and Tolm.

Camas Uig is in the parish of Uig and is part of the South Lewis, Harris and North Uist National Scenic Area.

In 1831, the 12th-century Lewis Chessmen were discovered in a small stone structure in the dunes behind the beach near Ardroil. Two large wooden chessmen, carved by Stephen Hayward, stand outside a museum on the machair at Ardroil, near where the hoard was found.
