= Ardroil =

Coordinates: 58.179°N 7.027°W

Ardroil: Scottish Gaelic: Eadar Dhà Fhadhail
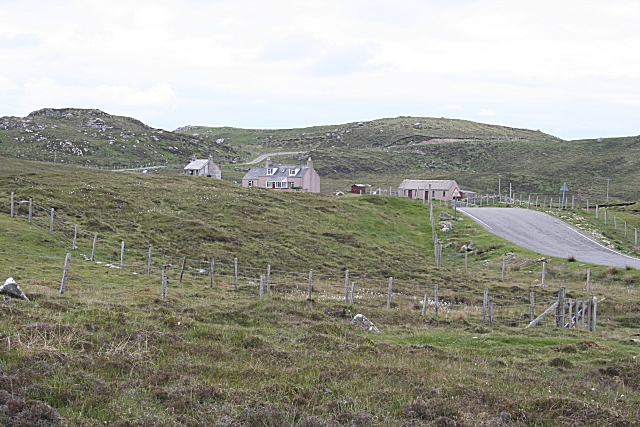
- On the right is the road which leads from Uig to Mealista past the houses at Ardroil

- Location within the Outer Hebrides
- Language: Scottish Gaelic; English
- OS grid reference: NB045321
- Civil parish: Uig
- Council area: Na h-Eileanan Siar
- Lieutenancy area: Western Isles
- Country: Scotland
- Sovereign state: United Kingdom
- Post town: ISLE OF LEWIS
- Postcode district: HS2
- Dialling code: 01851
- Police: Scotland
- Fire: Scottish
- Ambulance: Scottish
- UK Parliament: Na h-Eileanan an Iar
- Scottish Parliament: Na h-Eileanan an Iar

Ardroil (Scottish Gaelic: Eadar Dhà Fhadhail) is a village on the Isle of Lewis in the Outer Hebrides, Scotland. Ardroil is within the parish of Uig.

== Geography ==
Ardroil is more accurately the name of a fertile machair district by the expanse of Uig Bay between two rivers: The Forsa River and the Red River. The land is made fertile from the wind blown shell sand which has fertilised the black earth for centuries.

== History ==
What is today known as Ardroil is an elongated township of re-settled crofts from five previously cleared settlements. These clearances occurred in the 1830s as the landowner, the Earl of Seaforth, decided that the best land should be taken from tenant crofters and given to sheep farmers. This particular clearance evicted the tenants of the former healthily populated townships of Capadale (Capadal), Penny Donald (Peighinn Dhomhnaill), Balgowan (Baile Ghobhainn), Balgreasach (Baile Ghreusaich) and Erista (Earastadh). The inhabitants were forcibly sent to other parts of Lewis notably Swainbost, Ness but also to Canada.

The Lewis Chessmen were found in 1831 at a sand dune in Penny Donald by a man named Calum an Sprot and are among some of the greatest treasures found in Scotland.

== Economy ==
Ardroil is home to the Abhainn Dearg distillery.
