= Abhainn Dearg distillery =

Scotch whisky distillery in Scotland

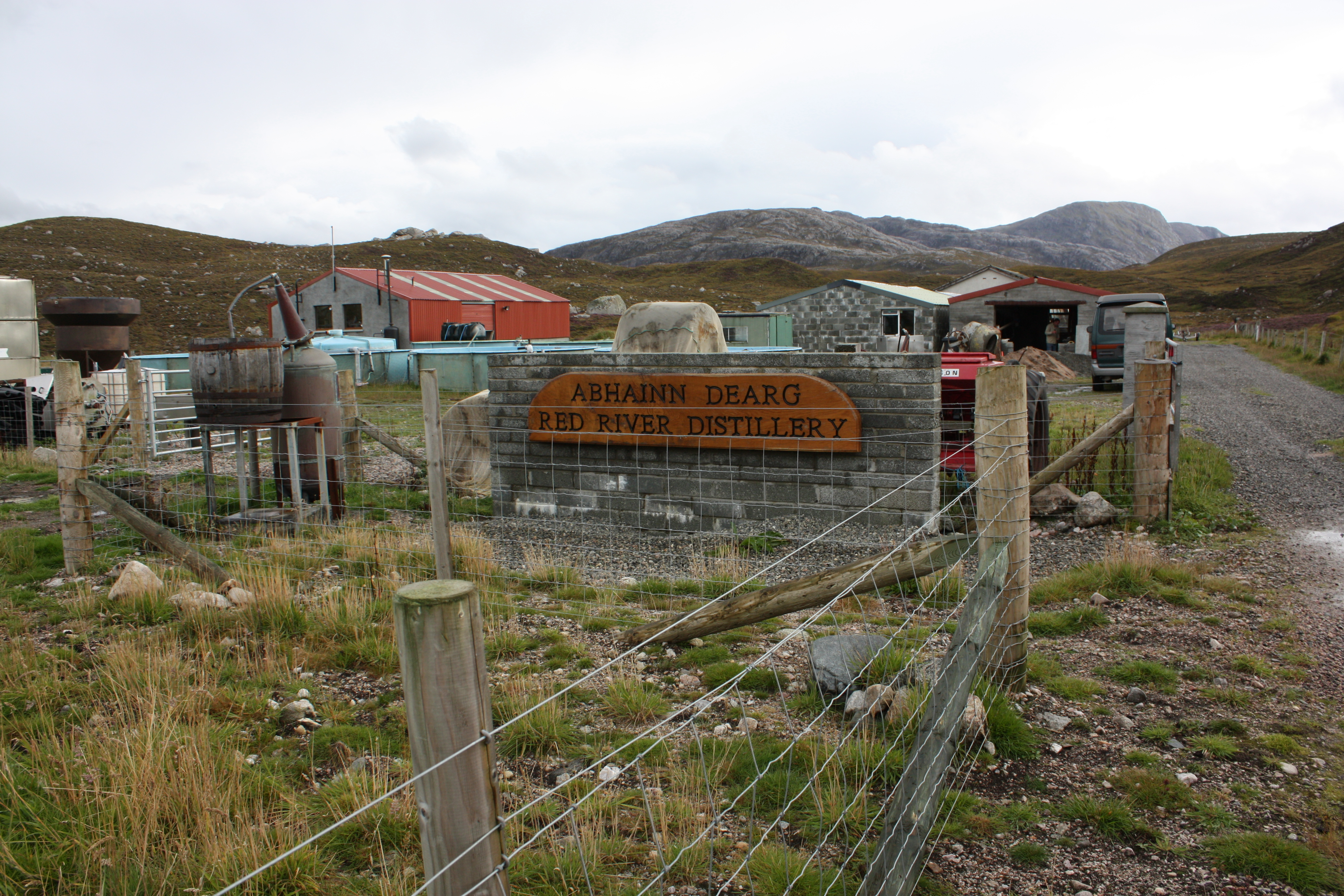

Region: Island
- Location: Uig, Isle of Lewis
- Coordinates: 58°10′15″N 7°02′41″W
- Owner: Mark Taybur
- Founded: 2008
- Status: Operational
- Water source: Loch Raonasgail
- No. of stills: 1 wash 1 spirit
- Capacity: 20,000 liters per year

Abhainn Dearg
- Type: Single malt, Scotch
- Age(s): newmake spirit, 3 years, 10 years
- Cask type(s): American White Oak, Ex-Bourbon Casks (Main) Ex Sherry Casks
- ABV: 46%, 56%, 58%

Abhainn Dearg distillery (/ˈævɪn ˈdʒɑːrɪk/ AV-in JAR-ik) or Red River distillery is a Scotch whisky distillery in Uig, on the west coast of the Isle of Lewis in the Outer Hebrides. It is the most westerly distillery in Scotland. The name is Scottish Gaelic for "Red River" which itself takes its name from a bloody skirmish in the dark ages when local people won a battle against Viking marauders.

== History ==
Under the ownership of Mark Tayburn, the distillery commenced production in September 2008. The distillery was built in a former salmon hatchery (and some of the pens are still in use producing fish). The still house is a new building and incorporates titled still heads in an unusual design modelled on former illicit stills in the area The distillery uses water from nearby Loch Raonasgail via the Abhainn Dearg.

The first whisky was released in 2011 and was named the "Spirit of Lewis".

== Products ==
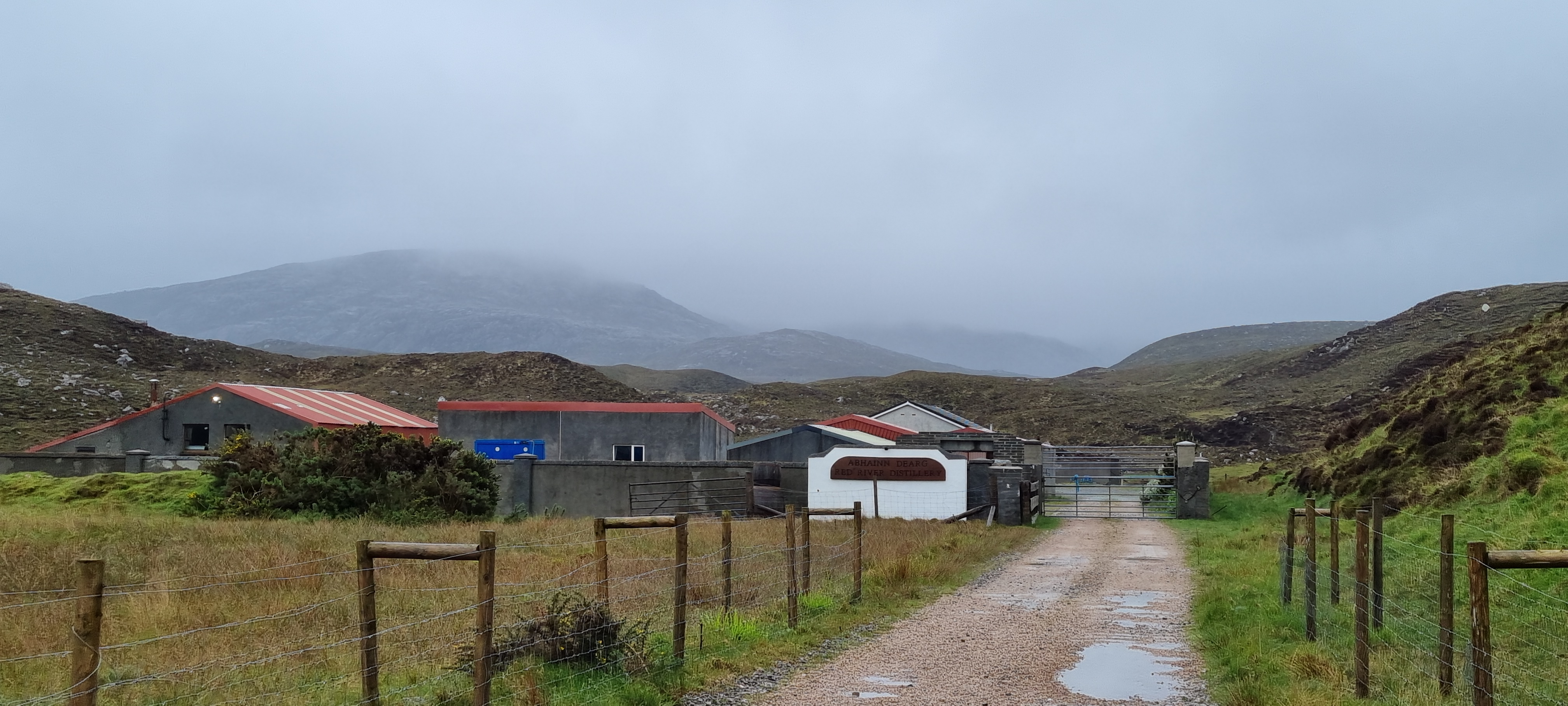
The distillery in 2022

- Spirit of Lewis

A 40% abv new make spirit aged for a few months on sherry oak casks.

- Spirit of Lewis Cask Strength for The Whisky Barrel

Matured in Sherry hogshead cask for three months and bottled at natural strength 56%.

- Abhainn Dearg Single Malt Special Edition

Matured in Bourbon casks and bottled at 46% with just 3 years old. A limited edition inaugural release of 2,011 bottles.

- Abhainn Dearg 3 Year Old Single Malt Cask Strength for The Whisky Barrel

Miniature bottling of the 3 year old Scotch matured in a Bourbon barrel and bottled at natural strength 58%.

- Abhainn Dearg 10 Year Old Single Malt

Matured in ex-bourbon casks and bottled at 46% ABV it is the oldest whisky to be produced by a legal distillery in the Outer Hebrides.

== See also ==
- List of whisky brands
- List of distilleries in Scotland
