= Uig, Lewis =

Civil parish in the Outer Hebrides, Scotland

Coordinates: 58.179°N 7.026°W

Uig: Scottish Gaelic: Ùig
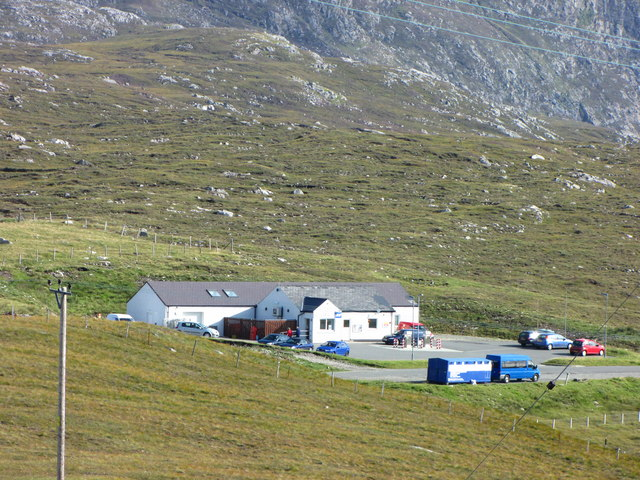
- Uig Community Shop

- Location within the Outer Hebrides
- Population: 423
  - Density: 8 km2
- Language: Scottish Gaelic; English
- OS grid reference: NB022334
- Civil parish: Uig
- Council area: Na h-Eileanan Siar
- Lieutenancy area: Western Isles
- Country: Scotland
- Sovereign state: United Kingdom
- Post town: ISLE OF LEWIS
- Postcode district: HS2
- Dialling code: 01851
- Police: Scotland
- Fire: Scottish
- Ambulance: Scottish
- UK Parliament: Na h-Eileanan an Iar
- Scottish Parliament: Na h-Eileanan an Iar

Uig (Scottish Gaelic: Ùig [uːkʲ]), also known as Sgìr' Ùig, is a civil parish and community in the west of the Isle of Lewis in the Outer Hebrides, Scotland. The Parish of Uig is one of the four civil parishes of the Isle of Lewis. It contains the districts of Carloway, East Uig, Bernera and West Uig (commonly known as Uig district or Uig Lewis). The name derives from the Norse word Vik meaning 'a bay'.

== Geography ==
The civil parish of Uig extends over a considerable area (roughly 250 sq mi or 650 km^{2}) from the Harris border in the south to Dalmore in the north, and from Brenish in the west to Lochganvich in the east. The district known locally in Lewis as Uig is also called "West Uig" and is broadly the area west of Little Loch Roag (the narrow inlet extending south from (West) Loch Roag). West Uig contains 20 settlements; Uig parish contains 36 settlements.

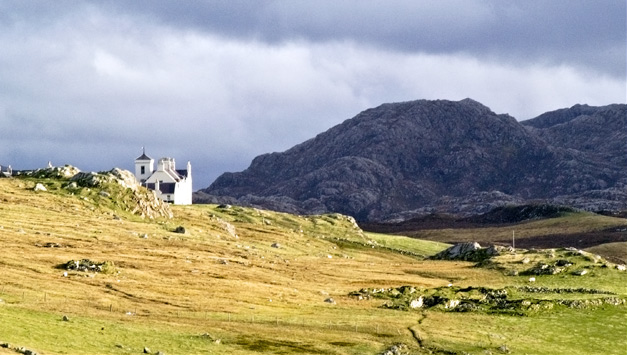
Uig Lodge

West Uig was a district of 2,000 people around the 1841 census, but the Highland Clearances had set in by then and this parish suffered greatly. The villages of Capadale, Pennydonald, Balnicol, Balgreasich and Erista, around where the modern scattered crofting township of Ardroil now stands, were some of the many cleared to make way for sheep farming and country sports.

Bhaltos (Valtos) is the largest village in Uig and is home to about 35 people. Since 1999 the land on the Bhaltos peninsula, comprising also the smaller villages of Cliobh (Cliff), Cnìp (Kneep), Riof (Reef) and Na h-Ùigean (Uigen), has been owned by the community and managed by the Bhaltos Community Trust.

Uig, otherwise known as West Uig, is the largest and most sparsely populated district of the Isle of Lewis. It contains the highest point on Lewis of Mealasbhal (574 m or 1,883 ft). Nearby Loch Suaineabhat (or Suaineabhal) at 61 metres (200 feet) is the deepest freshwater loch and with a mean depth of 33 metres (108 ft) also the most voluminous in Lewis. Loch Langavat (from the Gaelic/Norse meaning "long lake") to the west covers an area of 906.5 hectares (2,240 acres) and is over 11 kilometres (6.8 mi) in length.

The coast has significant inlets notably Little Loch Roag, Loch Thamnabhagh, Loch Reasort and Camas Uig.

Camas Ùig contains a vast strand of shell beach which produces a fertile "machair" fringe. Other shell sand beaches and machair are found at Tràigh na Beirigh, Bhaltos, Cliff, Capadale, Mangurstadh and Mealastadh.

The Atlantic west coast from Gallan Head to Loch Resort is dominated by cliffs and many small chasms known as "geodhs". Inland the land contains a glaciated profile with thin acidic soil and large rock outcrops of Lewisian gneiss. Of geological note is the discovery of the largest sapphire ever found in the British Isles. The 242-carat (48.4-gram) stone discovered in 1995 is on display at the National Museum of Scotland.

=== Camas Ùig ===
Uig Beach (Scottish Gaelic: Camas Ùig) is best known as the site where the Lewis Chessmen (Scottish Gaelic: Tàileasg Ùig) were found. Before 1831, a local crofter discovered a buried hoard of chess pieces, uncovered by a storm. The chessmen are now in the Museum of Scotland, Edinburgh with an overseas exhibit in the British Museum in London, and replicas in the Uig Heritage Centre in Tuimisgearraidh. They are mostly carved from walrus tusks, and probably originated in Norway sometime in the 12th century, although when and how they came to be in Uig is unknown.

Camas Ùig is surrounded by the villages of Cradhlasta (Crowlista), Tuimisgearraidh (Timsgarry), Eadar Dhà Fhadhail (Ardroil) and Càrnais (Carnish). The beach is one of Scotland's leading kite-buggy locations, being large, flat, and frequently subject to suitable winds.

== History ==
Evidence of extensive Norse settlement has been uncovered, most notably through interpretation of the place names in the district but also through archaeological discoveries, some of which are on display at the Uig Museum. The name Uig is generally accepted to be derived from the old Norse ‘Vík’. Military service – Uig district was a fruitful recruiting ground for soldiers in the 78th Seaforth Highlanders for the Napoleonic Wars, who were notably recruited in four waves in 1778, 1793, 1794 and 1804. Most notable of battle honours won was the victory at Maida, Italy, in 1806 and Java in 1811. Clearances – Despite military service and the ultimate sacrifice by many, the district was the subject of widespread evictions in the nineteenth century to make way for enlarged sheep farms and sporting estates. Villages around Uig Bay that were cleared were: Capadale, Pennydonald, Baileneacail, Baileghreusaich, Earastadh and Mealastadh, the largest township in the district. Parallel with the Highland clearances arose the birth of organised crofting in the 1840s. This produced the individual land holdings and linear township pattern recognisable today. The crofting system has always proved inadequate to provide an income for the people so other forms of income have always been crucial for the survival of these communities. Notable were the kelp industry and the great line fishing industry. The main sporting estates that were set up were at Uig Lodge, Morsgail and Scaliscro.

== Demographics ==
The current population of the district is around 400, which is the lowest recorded. This is compounded by an ageing demographic and a "constrictive pyramid" structure. The district had recorded 1,923 residents in 1841, prior to evictions that occurred over the next decade. The most notable evictions resulted in the passage of hundreds of people on the emigrant ships "Marquis of Stafford" and "Barlow" in 1851. At the turn of the twentieth century there were 1,631 residents in the district, and the population dipped below 1,000 for the first time after the Second World War.

According to the 2011 census, there are 873 Gaelic speakers (56%) in Uig parish.

== Clan MacAulay ==
Uig is the ancestral seat of the Clan MacAulay (Mac Amhlaigh). Through advanced Y DNA testing of a wide range of males from this family, it has been proven that the ancestor of this family had an Irish origin from well before the advent of surnames. They are distinct from several other unique Macaulay families on the Isle of Lewis, most of whom show Nordic or Scandinavian ancestry. The most famous chief of the Uig Macaulays was Donald Cam MacAulay, and his descendants have included the anti-slavery campaigner Zachary Macaulay and his son Thomas Babington Macaulay, 1st Baron Macaulay who wrote A History of England. A later descendant, T. B. MacAulay, founded the Sun Life of Canada insurance company. According to Lewis tradition, Uig is the birthplace of Coinneach Odhar, the Brahan Seer, a Nostradamus-type figure of the 16th century.

== Archaeology and historical Sites ==
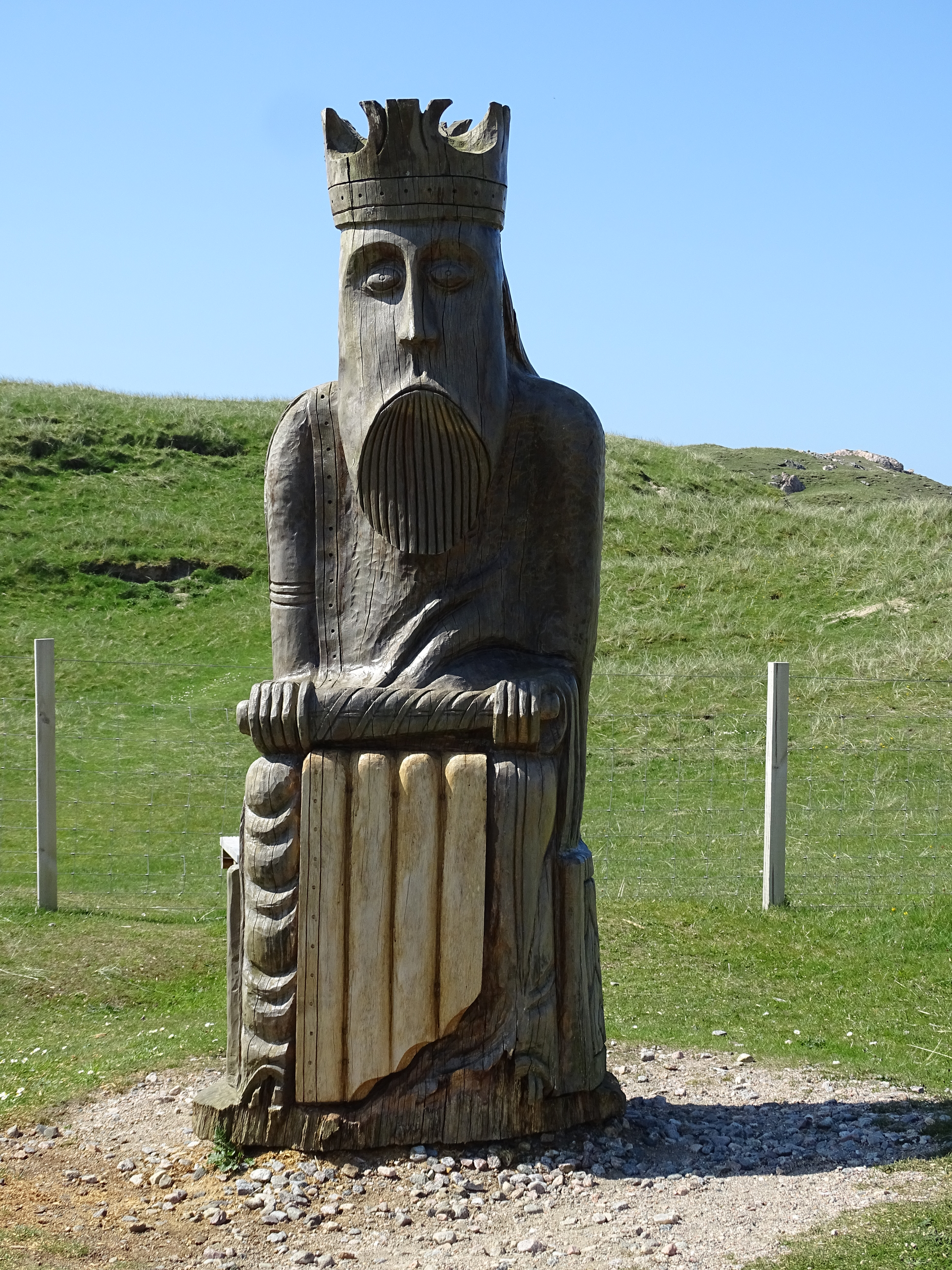
Chessman standing on the Uig Dunes near the site where the Lewis Chessmen were discovered. The work was commissioned in 2006 and carved in oak by Stephen Hayward.

The principal historical site in the parish is the Callanish Stones which are a Neolithic site of international importance. They are unusual in being cross-shaped with an avenue leading to the central point. This main Calanais site is connected to seven other stone circles in the locality.

Dun Carloway is the second-best preserved example of an Iron Age broch in Scotland after Mousa in Shetland. Other brochs in the parish include: Dùn Borrainis, Dùn Bharabhat (Cnìp), Dùn Bharabhat (Bernera), and Dùn Stiùgh.

A well-preserved wheelhouse at Cnìp, and two nearby brochs, make this area important archaeologically. In 1979 a rich female Viking burial was discovered on Cnìp headland. Furthermore, excavations done by GUARD archaeology in 2009 and 2010 found three different burials in shallow pits and on a kerbed mound. These burials contained the remains of nine people over a period of 150 years, between 1770 and 1620 BC. And the bodies were allowed to decay and become partly or wholly skeletonised before being buried.

Pennydonald by Camas Uig was the place of discovery of the Lewis Chessmen in 1831.

The remains of inter-connected circular houses are by the beach at Bòstadh, Bernera. They date from the Iron Age. A reconstruction of this part sub-terranean habitation is located nearby. Intact remains of further pre-Norse houses with overlapping flagstone roofs known as "beehive dwellings" are to be found on the Morsgail Moor and at Aiscleit.

The remains of many Norse water mills which used horizontal carved millstones are throughout the parish. Only one, at Breaclet, Bernera is roofed but others of note are found at Croir, Geisiadar, Pennydonald, Carnish and virtually every other township in the parish.

The remains of nineteenth century fish curing houses are to be found at Little Bernera, Croir, Tòb Bhalasaigh, Dunan Carloway, Bhaltos and Carnish. Other important sites are the Bernera lobster pond at Tòb Blàr Meadha and lobster ponds on the island of Pabaigh Mòr.

The ruins of Teampall Bhaltois are no longer visible but geophysical investigations, in 1992, found the buried remains of a rectangular building.

=== Pre-reformation chapels ===
The distinct remains of the following chapels exist in the parish: St. Kiarans, Laimisiadar, St. Michaels, Kirivick, St. Macrels, Kirkibost, St Dondans and St. Michaels, Little Bernera, St. Peters, Pabaigh Mhòr, St. Christophers, Uig Bay, Tigh na Beanaich, Aird Uig, and Tigh na Cailleachan Dhubha, Mealastadh.

== Abhainn Dearg Distillery ==
The Abhainn Dearg Red River Distillery, which began distilling in 2008, is located at Carnish in Uig, and claims to be "the first legal distillery in the Outer Hebrides since 1829".

== Notable people ==
- Dòmhnall Càm MacDhùghaill (c. 1560 – c. 1640) – clan chief of the MacAulays of Uig
- Zachary Macaulay (1768–1838) – anti slavery campaigner with the Clapham Sect and founder of the University of London
- Thomas Babington Macaulay (1800–1859) – 1st Baron Macaulay and British Whig politician and historian, author of The History of England
- Robertson Macaulay – president of the Sun Life Insurance Co of Canada
- Brahan Seer – legendary Scottish figure of the 17th century, said to have been born in the district
- Brian Wilson (born 1948) – former cabinet minister in the Blair and Brown UK administration
