= Mealista =

Coordinates: 58.104°N 7.108°W

Mealista: Scottish Gaelic: Mealasta
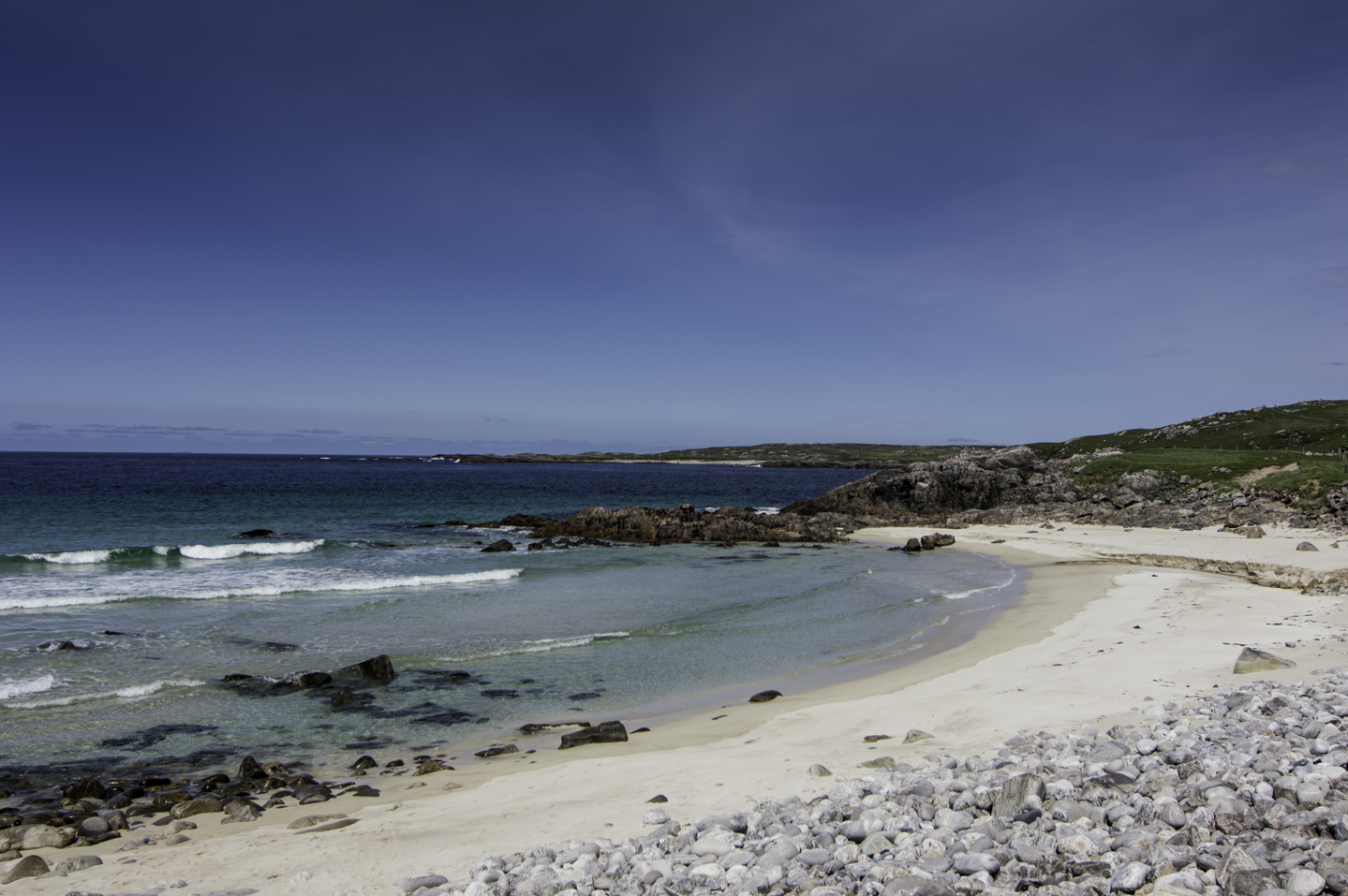
- Mealasta beach

- Location within the Outer Hebrides
- Language: Scottish Gaelic; English
- OS grid reference: NA991241
- Civil parish: Uig
- Council area: Na h-Eileanan Siar
- Lieutenancy area: Western Isles
- Country: Scotland
- Sovereign state: United Kingdom
- Post town: ISLE OF LEWIS
- Postcode district: HS2
- Dialling code: 01851
- Police: Scotland
- Fire: Scottish
- Ambulance: Scottish
- UK Parliament: Na h-Eileanan an Iar
- Scottish Parliament: Na h-Eileanan an Iar

Mealista (Scottish Gaelic: Mealasta) was a township in the west of the Isle of Lewis. It is currently largely uninhabited due to the Highland Clearances, which occurred there in 1838. The beach is a visitor attraction.

== History ==
Mealista is a name of Norse origin, melr-stadhr, meaning 'lyme-grass steading'. Mealasta lends its name to Eilean Mhealasta which is just to the southwest. The area of Mealasta is known to be the location of a medieval settlement

Tigh nan Cailleachan Dubha, the House of the Black Women, is one of the medieval ruins, which is purported to have been a nunnery, but that is doubted.

During World War II, fourteen of the survivors of the merchant ship SS Geraldine Mary reached shore at Mealista in August 1940. The ship had been torpedoed, off the coast of Ireland, by the German U-Boat U-52.

During WWII several hundred people were stationed at Mealista and Brenais, to operate wireless and radar installations. There was a cinema, a bar, regular dances, but the area was again abandoned after the war.

== Teampall Mhealastadh ==
Outside of Mealista is Teampall Mhealastadh, the remains of small chapel and graveyard. Most of the tombstones are now buried.
